= The Letters of Utrecht =

Social poem in the middle of a cobblestoned street in the Netherlands

Coordinates: 52°5′10″N 5°7′19″E

- De Letters van Utrecht (Dutch)
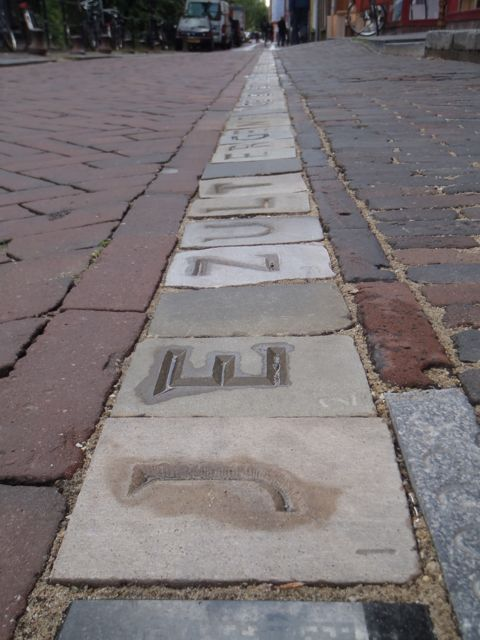
- Artist: milliongenerations.org, Utrecht's guild of poets and volunteers
- Year: 2012
- Type: Social sculpture
- Location: Utrecht, The Netherlands
- Owner: City of Utrecht

The Letters of Utrecht (Dutch: De Letters van Utrecht) form an endless poem in the stones of a street in the center of the Dutch city of Utrecht. Every Saturday at 13:00, the next letter is hewn into the next cobblestone, with the intent to continue for as long as there are Saturdays. It takes about three years to publish an average sentence. Every year the poem grows by about five meters. Every few years another poet extends the poem.

== The poem ==
The poem is created by members of Utrechts Guild of Poets and was started by Ruben van Gogh, Ingmar Heytze, Chrétien Breukers, Alexis de Roode, and Ellen Deckwitz. The poem was continued in February 2013 by Mark Boog, in December 2015 by the Iraqi-Dutch Baban Kirkuki, in December 2018 by Vicky Francken, in March 2022 Anne Broeksma. Hanneke van Eijken shall continue the poem from 2025 onwards.

== History ==
The first 648 letters (one for every Saturday since 1 January 2000) were unveiled on 2 June 2012 by Utrecht's mayor, Aleid Wolfsen, who contributed the letter hewn on location that day. Since this opening, stone masons from the Lettertijd guild have hewn the characters into subsequent stones every Saturday. The font was designed for the purpose by Hanneke Verheijke of Avant la Lettre. Stones with year numbers mark the planned route and turn the growing line of letters into a meter of time. If the citizens continue to fund the making of stones long enough, the line of poem will itself draw the letters U and T on the map of the city, and future citizens can decide on the future route beyond the year 2350. A future there will be, but it is unknown; the poet keeps the continuation of the poem beyond the most recently published letter secret.

== Background ==
The project is expressly intended for the benefit of future people. It is funded by contributors who donate Letters and add stories to them, which results in a growing number of people with an interest in the project's continuation and generates excess funds for practical good causes. The effort is driven by a not-for-profit foundation, Stichting Letters van Utrecht and run by volunteers. The concept for the Letters of Utrecht grew out of Milliongenerations' work of milliongenerations.org and was inspired by the efforts of Danny Hillis and the Long Now Foundation to build a 10,000 Year Clock to promote long-term thinking. The Long Now Foundation had contributed a stone cut from the Sierra Diablo Mountain Range in Texas where the 10,000 Year Clock is being built. That stone now carries letter number 1 (a "J").

As a social sculpture, The Letters of Utrecht refer to the 7000 Oaks of Joseph Beuys in Kassel, Germany. Beuys named his work City Forestation Instead of City Administration and conceptualized humanity's dependency on nature, referring to it as a 'Wärmezeitmaschine' ('heat-time-machine'). The Letters of Utrecht evoke civilizations' growth of knowledge and the dependency of future inhabitants on the actions of contemporaries and visualize the passing of time and the reality of the future.

The continuation of the Letters depends on the willingness of citizens to sponsor the creation of a letter in return for having a name or dedication engraved in the side of the cobblestone and on a website, which hopes to let people consider their reputation among posterity rather than their status among contemporaries.

== See also ==
- 10,000 year Clock of the Long Now
- 7000 Oaks
- As Slow as Possible
- Longplayer
- On Kawara
- Roman Opalka
- Social sculpture
- Street art
- Zeitpyramide
