= Zeitpyramide =

Work of public art by Manfred Laber

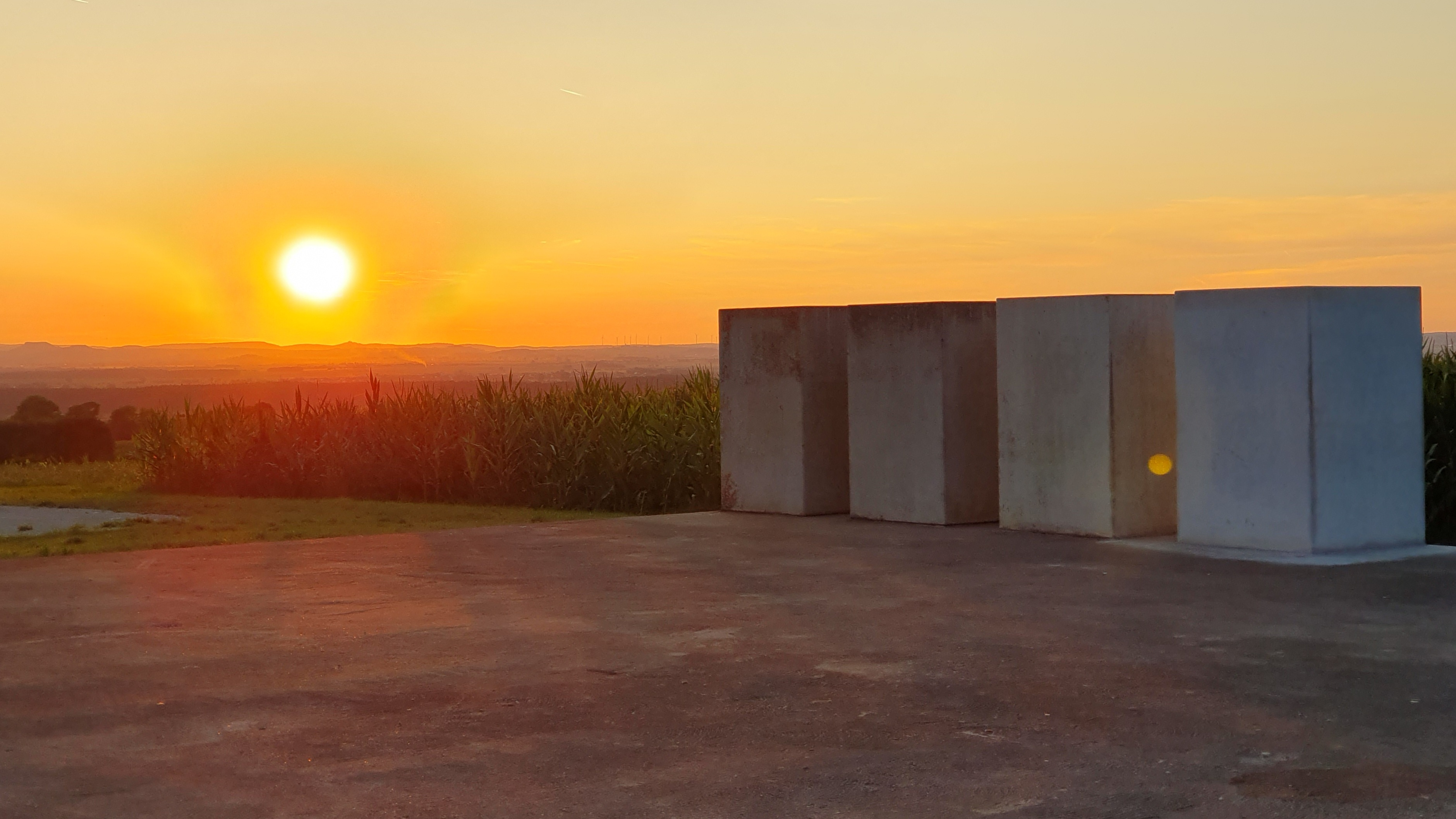
- Sunset at the four-block Zeitpyramide, 2023. Around 434,600 sunsets are to take place at the site between the laying of the first and last block.
- Interactive map of Zeitpyramide
- 48°53′03″N 10°43′17″E
- Architect: Manfred Laber (1932–2018)
- Constructed: Began 23 October 1993; 33 years ago Finishes 3183; 1157 years' time)
- Type: Step pyramid (currently 3% complete)
- Material: Concrete
- Height: 9.2 metres (30 ft) (when done)
- Base: 15 metres (49 ft) (concrete pad)
- Volume: 311 cubic metres (407 cu yd; 10,983 cu ft) (when done)
- Slope: 43°

The Zeitpyramide (lit. 'time pyramid') is a work of public art by Manfred Laber under construction in Wemding, Germany. The pyramid's construction began in 1993, the year of the town's 1,200th anniversary. With a new block added every ten years, the structure is planned to consist of 120 blocks when complete after 1,190 years, in the year 3183.

== Concept ==
The town of Wemding dates back to the year AD 793 (during the reign of Charlemagne as King of the Franks) and celebrated its 1,200th anniversary in 1993. The Zeitpyramide was conceived by Manfred Laber (a local artist) in June 1993 to mark this 1,200-year period and to give people a sense of what the span of 1,200 years really means.

One block is scheduled to be placed every decade for 1,190 years. This time includes the initial block placed at the beginning of the project, which explains the apparent off-by-one error of ten years. So far, the blocks have all been concrete, but the material of future blocks may be altered in future generations depending on availability of materials.

The artwork is intended to take its own path without the artist, directed by the community, and will "make time itself more concrete, more tangible".

=== Artist ===
Manfred Laber was born in Wemding on 5 May 1932 and studied painting at the Hochschule für Bildende Künste in Berlin in the 1950s. He has other artwork on permanent display in Mormoiron, France, San Antonio Island, and Alcanar, Spain, his part-time residence. He died in Wemding on 17 August 2018, aged 86.

== Construction ==
Trimetric projection of the design

The time pyramid is located on a concrete pad on a rounded hilltop, the Robertshöhe, on the northern edge of Wemding. The first block was placed in October 1993. The 6.5-tonne (6.4-long-ton; 7.2-short-ton) fourth and most recent block was placed at 15:06 on 9 September 2023. Following the construction schedule, the fifth block will be placed in 2033.

The project's initial financing was mostly achieved through donations by local companies, which, for example, supplied the materials for the concrete slab for free. The project is administered by a foundation based in Wemding.

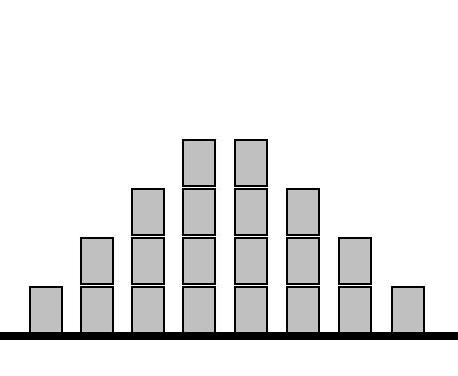
Profile (side view) of the completed design

A model of the final artwork is exhibited at Wemding, at the Haus des Gastes. If the time pyramid project proceeds according to plan, it will fall into four stages based on tier layer:

- The base layer, measuring 13.8 by 13.8 m (45 by 45 ft), will consist of 64 blocks arranged in 8 rows and 8 columns and has a stage completion date of 2623.
- The second layer will consist of 36 blocks, in a 6-by-6 format with a stage completion date of 2983. This is the first layer that requires a block to be placed atop another block, which would require a crane or some form of scaffolding such as an earthen ramp used as an incline, although, by at least 2023, placement was already using a crane.
- The third layer will consist of 16 blocks arranged in a 4-by-4 format with a stage completion date of 3143.
- The final, fourth layer will consist of 4 blocks, arranged in a 2-by-2 format, which upon installation will complete the structure.

The pyramid, when completed in the year 3183, is scheduled to consist of 120 stone or concrete blocks, each measuring 1.2 m (3.9 ft) long, 1.2 m (3.9 ft) wide and 1.8 m (5.9 ft) tall. Adjacent blocks are separated by gaps of half a block or 0.6 m (2.0 ft).

=== Longevity ===
Unlike ancient human structures such as the Great Pyramid of Giza — which is made from limestone, mortar, and granite, and which has lasted more than 4,500 years — the lifespan of reinforced concrete and regular blocks of concrete is typically only 50–100 years. However, concrete blocks can last indefinitely when properly maintained or weatherproofed.

== Construction schedule ==
Block number	Date placed	Tier	Notes	Image
—N/a	between July 1993 and 23 October 1993	—N/a	Laying of the concrete pad foundation for the blocks. Local donors supplied the materials for free.	—N/a
1	23 October 1993	First tier	The first block placed.	—N/a
2	6 September 2003	First tier	—N/a	—N/a
3	29 June 2013	First tier	The last block to be placed before the death of the artist Laber.	
4	9 September 2023	First tier	The latest block to have been placed, and also the first block whose placement was live-streamed. The first block placed after the death of Manfred Laber in 2018.	
5	2033	First tier	The next block is scheduled to be placed.	—N/a
6	2043	First tier	—N/a	—N/a
7	2053	First tier	—N/a	—N/a
8	2063	First tier	The last block to be placed on the first row.	—N/a
⋮
64	2623	First tier	The first tier is scheduled for completion.	—N/a
65	2633	Second tier	The first block scheduled to be placed within the second tier, and the first block which is assumed to require scaffolding.	—N/a
⋮
100	2983	Second tier	The second tier will be completed near the end of the 3rd millennium AD.	—N/a
⋮
116	3143	Third tier	The third tier is scheduled for completion.	—N/a
⋮
120	3183	Fourth tier	The last block is scheduled to be placed, 1,190 years after the first, and 2,390 years after the town's foundation.	

== See also ==
- 7000 Oaks – City Forestation Instead of City Administration by Joseph Beuys, consisting of 7000 trees and basalt stone pillars planted over the course of five years.
- Longplayer by Jem Finer, which began playing on 31 December 1999, and will continue to play without repetition until 2999.
- Organ²/ASLSP As Slow as Possible by John Cage, playing nonstop since September 2001 and due to finish 2640.
