= Joseph Beuys Sculpture Park =

University of Maryland Baltimore County park

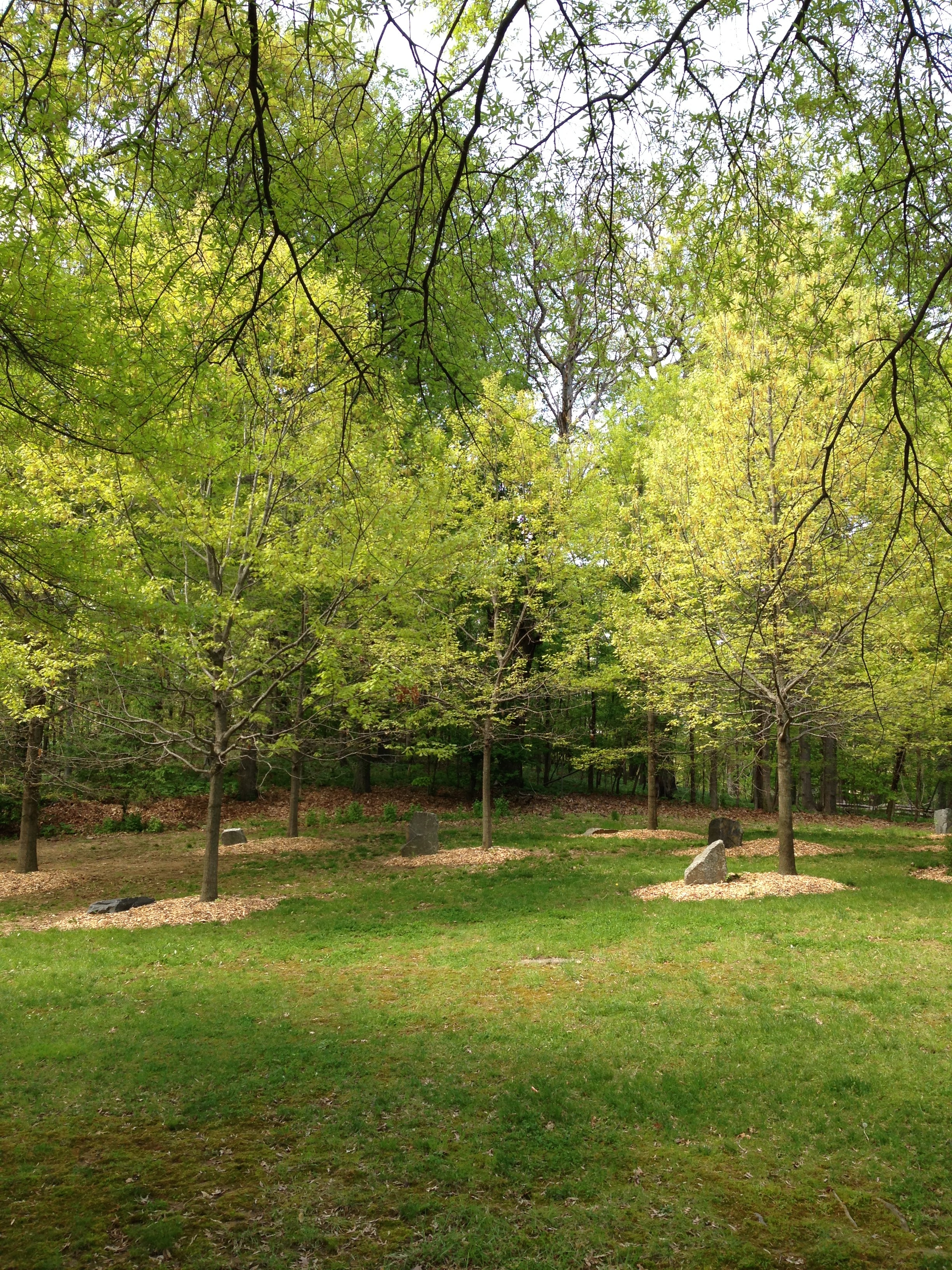
- The sculpture park consists of a variety of rocks and plantings.
- Location: Hilltop Circle and Commons Drive; Baltimore, Maryland, USA 21228
- Coordinates: 39°15′08″N 76°42′36″W
- Established: 2001
- Etymology: Joseph Beuys
- Vegetation: 30 Oaks
- Website: www.umbc.edu/cadvc/exhibitions/beuys.php

Joseph Beuys Sculpture Park is a park located on the campus of the University of Maryland Baltimore County (UMBC) in Baltimore County, Maryland, inspired by Joseph Beuys' extensive 7000 Oaks tree planting project. The original project transformed the sidewalks and landscape of Kassel, Germany, with the planting of 7,000 oak trees between 1982 and 1987. As part of the Tree Partnership, over 200 trees were planted among Patterson Park, Carroll Park, and Wyman Park in Baltimore.

The Sculpture Park is managed by the Center for Art, Design and Visual Culture at UMBC.

== Location ==
The Joseph Beuys Sculpture Park is located on the UMBC campus between Administration Drive and Commons Drive, along Hilltop Circle. There are multiple paths (paved and unpaved) that run through the park, which allows for student access.
