= ART/MEDIA =

Socio-political public art series

ART/MEDIA was a social sculpture project in the form of a series of socio-political public art events that took place in 1986 in Albuquerque and Santa Fe New Mexico. This groundbreaking artist forum featured artworks presented to the public through the mass media in a series of artist-designed billboards, television, radio and print media, and in museum exhibitions, a lecture series, and performance art series. Through this extended format, the artwork and ideas of contemporary artists were made accessible to a large public audience outside of the traditional art audience.

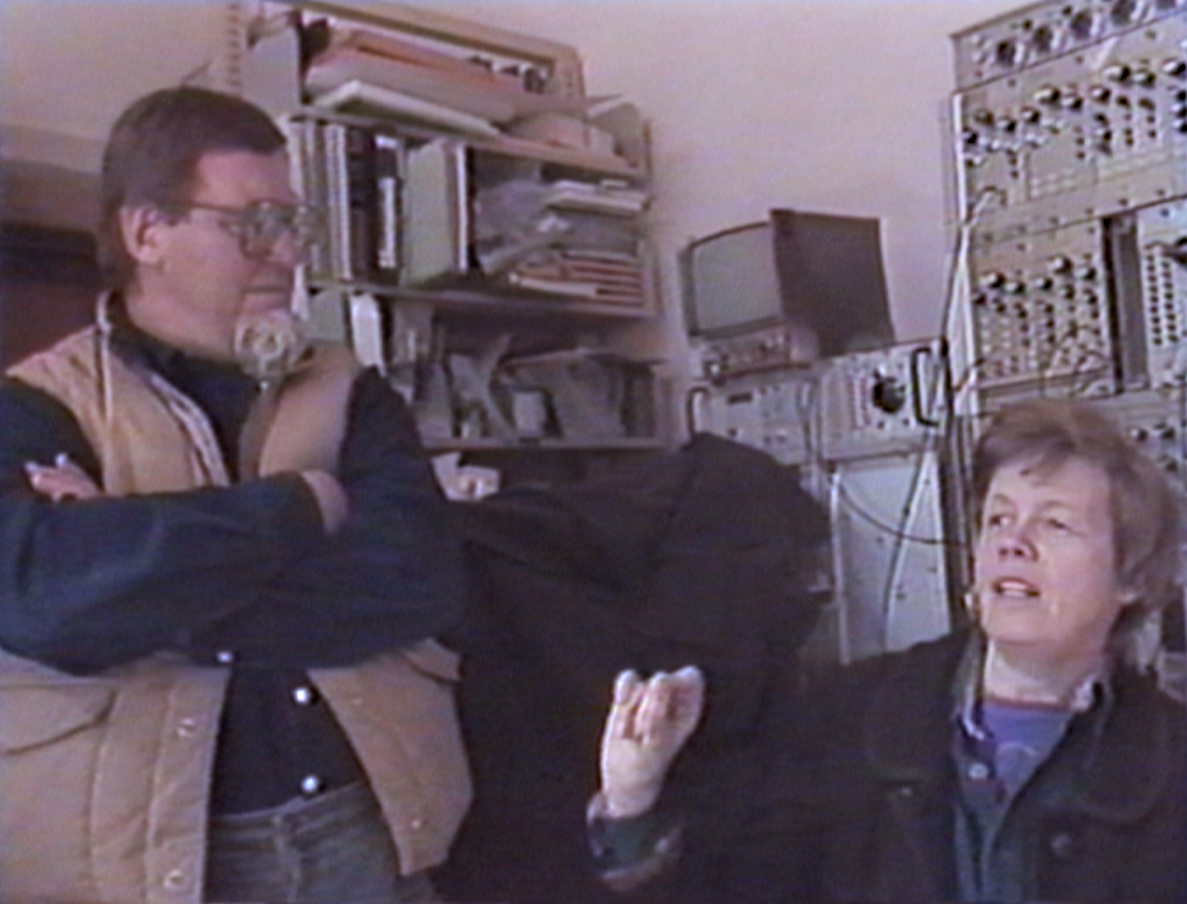
Steina and Woody Vasulka, who video documented ART/MEDIA, speaking in their studio on the role of art in contemporary society. 1986

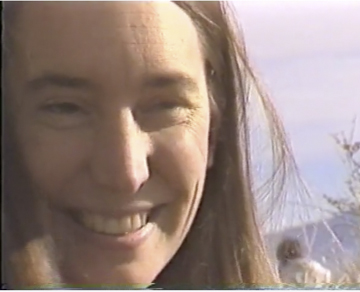
Jenny Holzer interviewed in New Mexico on artists working with the Mass Media. 1986. Still from video by Steina & Woody Vasulka, used with permission.

== Social sculpture and political art ==
ART/MEDIA operated as a museum without walls with an office located in the historical Kimo Theater on Route 66. National and locally known artists were commissioned to create socio-political artwork presented through the mass media. These works addressed critical issues of the time, such as nuclear proliferation, environmental degradation, human rights, animal rights, and loss of privacy through technology. The associated forum and events stimulated discourse between local communities and nationally known artists through hands-on video workshops, interviews, lectures, performances, informal discussions and road trips. Inspired by the concept/model of Joseph Beuys social sculpture, that have the potential to transform society, ART/MEDIA was an extended artwork that included human interactions, creating structures and systems within society using language, thought, objects, events and actions. The project was documented by video artists Steina and Woody Vasulka who founded The Kitchen in New York City in 1971.

== Artists involved ==
Artists involved in ART/MEDIA included: Hans Haacke, Jenny Holzer, Rachel Rosenthal, Terry Allen (artist), Paul Bob of Bob and Bob, Church of the SubGenius, Godfrey Reggio and the Institute for Regional Education, Mohammed Jim 5X (Jim Stuber), Larry Goodell, Violet Ray, Bob Willis, The Carcass Sisters, Jean-Paul Curtay, Louise Maffitt and Robert McDermott, Patrick Clancy and Gwen Widmer, Lee Connor, Barbara Bock, Manny Rettinger, John P. McCloskey, Steven Durland of High Performance Magazine, and the art critic/historian, Craig Owens (critic).

== Works in the mass media ==
Artist-designed billboards included a series of forty billboards by Jenny Holzer addressing Ronald Reagan's Strategic Defense Initiative, and deployed a fleet of Holzer's Inflammatory Statements street posters. Rachel Rosenthal designed a billboard dealing with animal rights for laboratory rats. Paul Bob designed a series of billboards on the practice of everyday life. Artist-designed print media projects included a color spread by Patrick Clancy and Gwen Widmer that recontextualized articles within Albuquerque Magazine, Jenny Holzer produced a large print piece containing her inflammatory statements that was inserted into the Sunday edition of the Albuquerque Journal newspaper, Paul Bob, and Rosenthal produced projects in other statewide publications.

== Exhibitions, lectures, and performances ==
Exhibitions included Subversive Acts: Artists Working With The Media Politically, at the New Mexico Museum of Art at the University of New Mexico Art Museum, and the Art Gallery Fogelson Library Center at the College of Santa Fe. Subversive Acts was an exhibition of mass media forms utilized by artists to present their sociological, environmental and political messages. The video exhibition Tuning In, took place at the Museum of Fine Arts, Santa Fe, and the Art Gallery of the College of Santa Fe. Public performances included visual artist and country western singer, Terry Allen (artist), performance artist and ecological activist Rachel Rosenthal, Paul Bob and performance poet, Larry Goodell. Public lectures included Hans Haacke on art, economics and ethics, Jenny Holzer speaking on the power of public art interventions to change human consciousness, Steven Durland on the history of performance art, Craig Owens (critic) of Art in America Magazine speaking on the relationship between political art and the mass media.

== History ==
The concept for the project originated in 1984 with artists Duane Griffin, Patrick Clancy and Scott Portman who later joined with co-directors Eve Andree Laramee and Ann Zimmerman to found the project and organization. The Santa Fe Center for Contemporary Arts was the fiscal sponsor under 501c3 not-for-profit status. Bob Gaylor, then director of SFCCC and invited the team to be part of a think tank at St. John's College along with Steina and Woody Vasulka, Allan Kaprow, Carolee Schneemann, Edward T. Hall, Jerome Rothenberg. Empowered by this experience, a team of advisors were assembled. Gaylor served as a primary advisor throughout the project, along with Gordon Church of the City of Albuquerque Cultural Affairs Office. The Albuquerque Arts Alliance and the City of Albuquerque became the second fiscal sponsor, providing an office in the historical Kimo Theater on Route 66. Steina and Woody Vasulka introduced the organizers to Godfrey Reggio, director of the film Koyannisqatsi (1982) who provided guidance on organizing Social Sculpture events as public service announcements. Reggio, having been involved in numerous progressive political causes, took interest because his Institute for Regional Education had developed a multi-media campaign of PSA's for the American Civil Liberties Union on the invasion of privacy and use of technology to control behavior in 1972. The project was sponsored by the National Endowment for the Arts, Albuquerque Arts Alliance, the Santa Fe Center for Contemporary Art, and the New Mexico Arts Division. Grants were received from the National Endowment for the Arts in the InterArts and the Artist Forums categories and the New Mexico Arts Division.

== See also ==
- Conceptual art
- Ecofeminist art
- Environmental art
- Fine art
- Mass media
- New media art
- Performance art
- Public art
- Social sculpture
- Visual arts
