= Fettecke =

1982 abstract artwork by Joseph Beuys

The Fettecke (Ger: "Fat Corner") was an abstract work of art from the German artist Joseph Beuys. On April 28, 1982, Beuys placed five kilograms of butter in a corner of his art room about two meters below the ceiling in the main building of the Kunstakademie Düsseldorf (Düsseldorf Academy of Art). His motivation for the artwork came from the anticipation of Lama Sogyal Rinpoche, whom Beuys had invited on behalf of the Dalai Lama in Europe, and a seminar of the Free International University. In the Period that followed, the plastic served as "a constant demonstration object."

== The end of the Fettecke ==
In 1986, a custodian in the Art Academy of Düsseldorf cleaned up the butter about nine months after Beuys' death. Johannes Stuettgen claimed ownership of the art piece, as Beuys had said "Johannes, I'm finally making your Fettecke" at the time of its creation.
