= Erwin Pfrang =

German painter, printmaker and poet (born 1951)

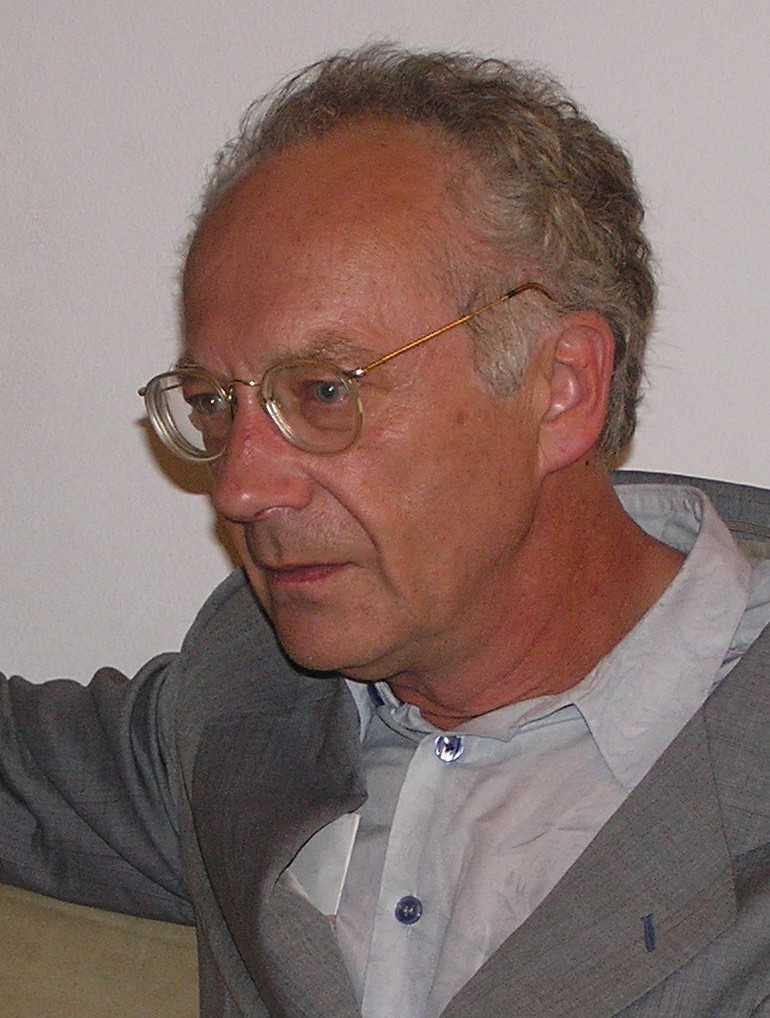
- Erwin Pfrang
- Born: 23 October 1951 (age 74); Munich, Germany
- Occupations: Painter and printmaker

Erwin Pfrang (born 23 October 1951, in Munich) is a German painter, printmaker and poet.

== Life and work ==
Pfrang studied at the Academy of Fine Arts in Munich from 1974–79. Later he spent many years as an independent artist in Montepulciano, Val d’Orcia and Catania, Italy, interrupted by stays in Munich and Augsburg. He presently lives and works in Berlin. Erwin Pfrang is the grandson of the Munich folk comedian Konstantin Pfrang.

Carla Schulz-Hoffmann makes an attempt at characterising the painter: “An artist such as Erwin Pfrang inhabits an alternative world, a tiny microcosm of subjectivity, and lives that life uncompromisingly, with all the limitations and hardships that it entails. Among twentieth-century artists a comparable stance can be encountered perhaps in Jean Fautrier, but certainly in Wols. The succinct characterization of the latter’s manner of working by his friend Henry Pierry Roché applies equally well to Pfrang: ‘Wols sheds his drawings as a snail does its shell – naturally and painfully.’”

Erwin Pfrang is represented by gallerists Fred Jahn, Munich and David Nolan, New York.

=== Painting and Literature ===
Pfrang’s lifelong passion for literature becomes particularly evident in his involvement with the works of the Irish writer James Joyce. The result being three cycles of drawings about Dubliners and Ulysses. The New York Times called his drawings for the Circe episode of the novel: "a brilliant solo debut." Other drawings are dedicated to the tale Tubutsch by the German Expressionist writer Albert Ehrenstein and Gerald Barry's opera The Intelligence Park, libretto by Vincent Deane. In 2022 he published poems to a selection of his pictures with the title Fingerspitzenhorizonte (Fingertiphorizons).

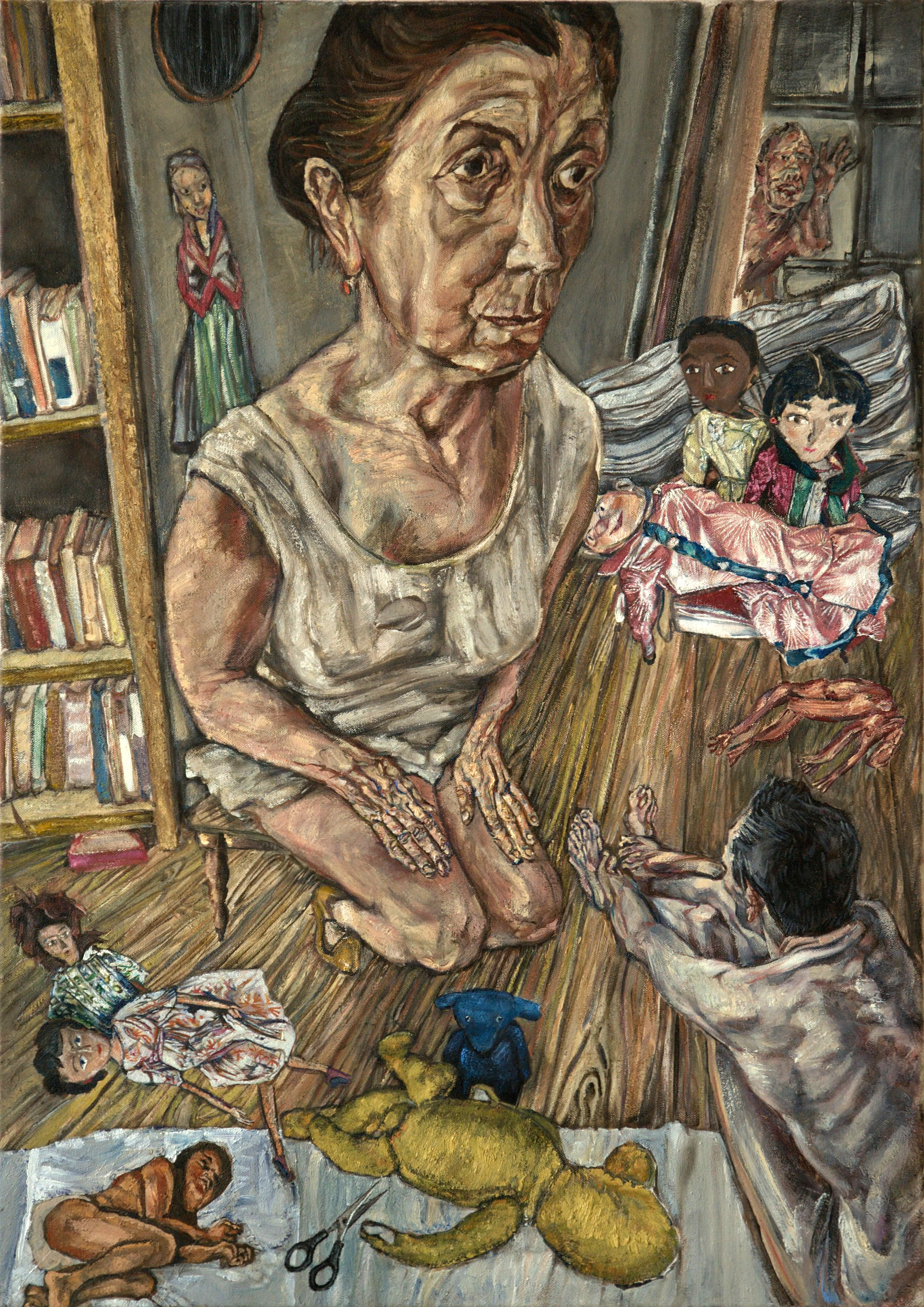
La bambolaia

=== Representationalism ===
Pfrang comments on the role of representationalism in his work as follows: “Non-representational art presupposes the artist’s knowledge of what reality is. If reality as the result of our questionable sensory experiences, however, is not something we take for granted, we are obliged to "actually create reality" (Günter Eich), to auscultate the world and its objects to discover their nature, and in the painter's case to sound it out with the blindman's stick of the brush.

== Museums ==
- Albertina, Vienna
- Busch-Reisinger Museum, Cambridge, Massachusetts
- Fogg Art Museum, Harvard
- Morgan Library & Museum, New York
- Museum Of Modern Art, New York
- Neue Pinakothek, Munich
- Saint Louis Art Museum, Saint Louis, Missouri
- Staatliche Graphische Sammlung München, Munich
- Yale University Art Gallery, New Haven

== Important exhibitions ==
- 1984 Zeichnungen, Fred Jahn Munich
- 1991 Circe Drawings, David Nolan, New York
- 1995 Dubliners and Related Works, David Nolan, New York
- 1998 Odysseus und kein Ende, Staatliche Graphische Sammlung, Munich
- 1999 Bilder, Staatsgalerie Moderner Kunst, Munich
- 2000 Paintings and Drawings, The Norwood Gallery, Austin, Texas
- 2004 Circe Drawings, Bank of Ireland Arts Centre, Dublin
- 2004 Bilder, Zeichnungen und Graphik, Völcker & Freunde Galerie, Berlin
- 2006 Paintings, Daniel Weinberg Gallery, Los Angeles
- 2007 Hades, Pinakothek der Moderne, Munich
- 2007 Mostra di Erwin Pfrang, Università di Catania
- 2012 New Pictures, Fred Jahn, Munich
- 2015 New Pictures, Matthias Jahn, Munich
- 2016 Axel Pairon Gallery, Knokke
- 2019 Buchheim Museum, Bernried
- 2021-22 Katholische Akademie in Bayern, Munich
- 2024 Gallery Jahn und Jahn, Munich

== Literature ==
- Erwin Pfrang: Zeichnungen, exhibition catalogue: Galerie Fred Jahn, München, 1984, text: Dieter Kuhrmann, Erwin Pfrang
- Holler, Wolfgang, Zeichenkunst der Gegenwart: Sammlung Prinz Franz von Bayern, exhibition catalogue: Staatliche Graphische Sammlung, München, 1988, p. 147–149
- Smith, Roberta, review of Alberto Giacometti: Prints & Erwin Pfrang, Frank Günzel, Rudi Tröger: Drawings, David Nolan Gallery, New York, The New York Times, 6. Januar 1989
- Künstler '89 im Palais Preysing, exhibition catalogue: Bayerische Vereinsbank, München, 1989, p. 77–83, 95, Text: Carla Schulz-Hoffmann
- Erwin Pfrang: Circe Drawings Based on James Joyce's "Ulysses", exhibition catalogue: David Nolan Gallery, New York, 1991, Text: Erwin Pfrang
- Kimmelmann, Michael, review of Circe Drawings, David Nolan Gallery, The New York Times, 13 September 1991
- Jones, Alan, review of Circe Drawings, David Nolan Gallery, New York, Carte Blanche, 16 September 1991
- 9. Nationale der Zeichnung Augsburg: Kleine Welten – Das Private in der Gegenwartskunst, exhibition catalogue: Stadtsparkasse, Augsburg, 1994, p. 94–95, Text: Gode Krämer
- Joyce, James, Dubliner, translation: Harald Beck; afterword: Wolfgang Hilbig; illustrations: Erwin Pfrang, Reclam, Leipzig, 1994
- Smith, Roberta, Review of Dubliner Drawings and Related Works, Nolan/Eckman Gallery, New York, The New York Times, 20 October 1995
- 6 Personali, exhibition catalogue: Castelluccio di Pienza-La Foce, Siena, 1997, p. 26—28, ed. Plinio de Martiis, text: Alan Jones
- Erwin Pfrang: Arbeiten auf Papier & Odysseus und kein Ende, exhibition catalogues (2 volumes): Staatliche Graphische Sammlung, München, 1998, text: Claudia Denk, Tilman Falk, Michael Semff
- Erwin Pfrang: I0 & LUI, exhibition catalogue: Nolan/Eckman Gallery, New York, 1999
- Erwin Pfrang: Bilder, exhibition catalogue: Staatsgalerie moderner Kunst, München, Verlag Fred Jahn, München, 1999, Text: Peter Eikemeier, Carla Schulz-Hoffmann
- Dunham, Carroll, "Erwin Pfrang", Bomb, No. 69, Dec. 1999, p. 94—97
- Gawell, Lynn, "The Muse Is Within: The Psyche in the Century of Science", in: Dreams 1900-2000, Cornell University Press, Binghamton University Art Museum, State University of New York, 2000, p. 49–50
- Günzel, Frank, in: Unterwegs, exhibition catalogue: Bayerische Akademie der Schönen Künste, München, 2001
- Lerm Hayes, Christa-Maria, "Illustrations with a Difference", in: Joyce in Art, exhibition catalogue: Royal Hibernian Academy, Dublin, 2004, p. 63
- Robustelli, Gianni, Erwin Pfrang, Dissertation: Università degli Studi di Genova, Genua, 2004
- Erwin Pfrang, "Entwurf einer Rede" in: Erwin Pfrang. Illustrationen zu James Joyce Dubliners, Center for Advanced Studies, LMU, Munich 2013, pp. 3–7
- Tobias Döring, "Erwin Pfrang illustriert Joyces Dubliners" in: Erwin Pfrang. Illustrationen zu James Joyce Dubliners, Center for Advanced Studies, LMU, Munich 2013, pp. 9–16
- Daniel J. Schreiber, ed., Erwin Pfrang: "Gedacht durch meine Augen", Bernried 2019
- Erwin Pfrang: Das Gedächtnis der Hand, München 2021 (English and German)
- Erwin Pfrang, Fingerspitzenhorizonte (Fingertiphorizons). Gedichte (Poems), Berlin: Boer 2022
