= 7000 Oaks =

Work of land art by Joseph Beuys

Coordinates: 51°18′48″N 9°29′50″E

- 7000 Eichen (German)
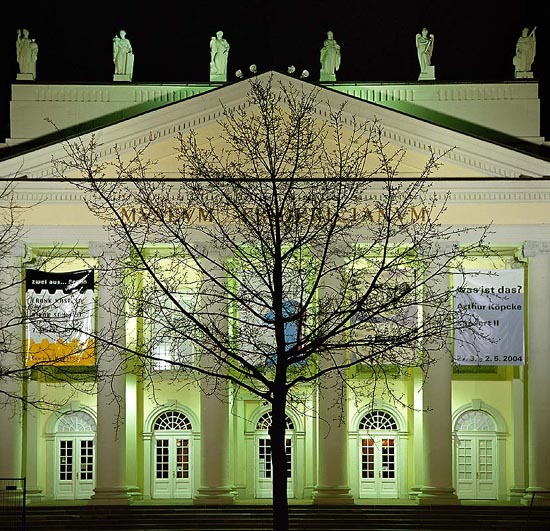
- Artist: Joseph Beuys
- Year: 1982
- Type: Land art
- Location: Kassel, Hesse, Germany

7000 Oaks – City Forestation Instead of City Administration (German: 7000 Eichen – Stadtverwaldung statt Stadtverwaltung) is a work of land art by the German artist Joseph Beuys. It was first publicly presented in 1982 at documenta 7.

== The project ==
With the help of volunteers, Beuys planted 7,000 oak trees over five years in Kassel, Germany, each with an accompanying basalt stone. The black stones were initially piled outside the Fridericianum museum, only being removed as each tree was planted.

In response to the extensive urbanization of the setting the work was a long-term and large-scale artistic and ecological intervention with the goal of enduringly altering the living space of the city. The project, though at first controversial, has become an important part of Kassel's cityscape.

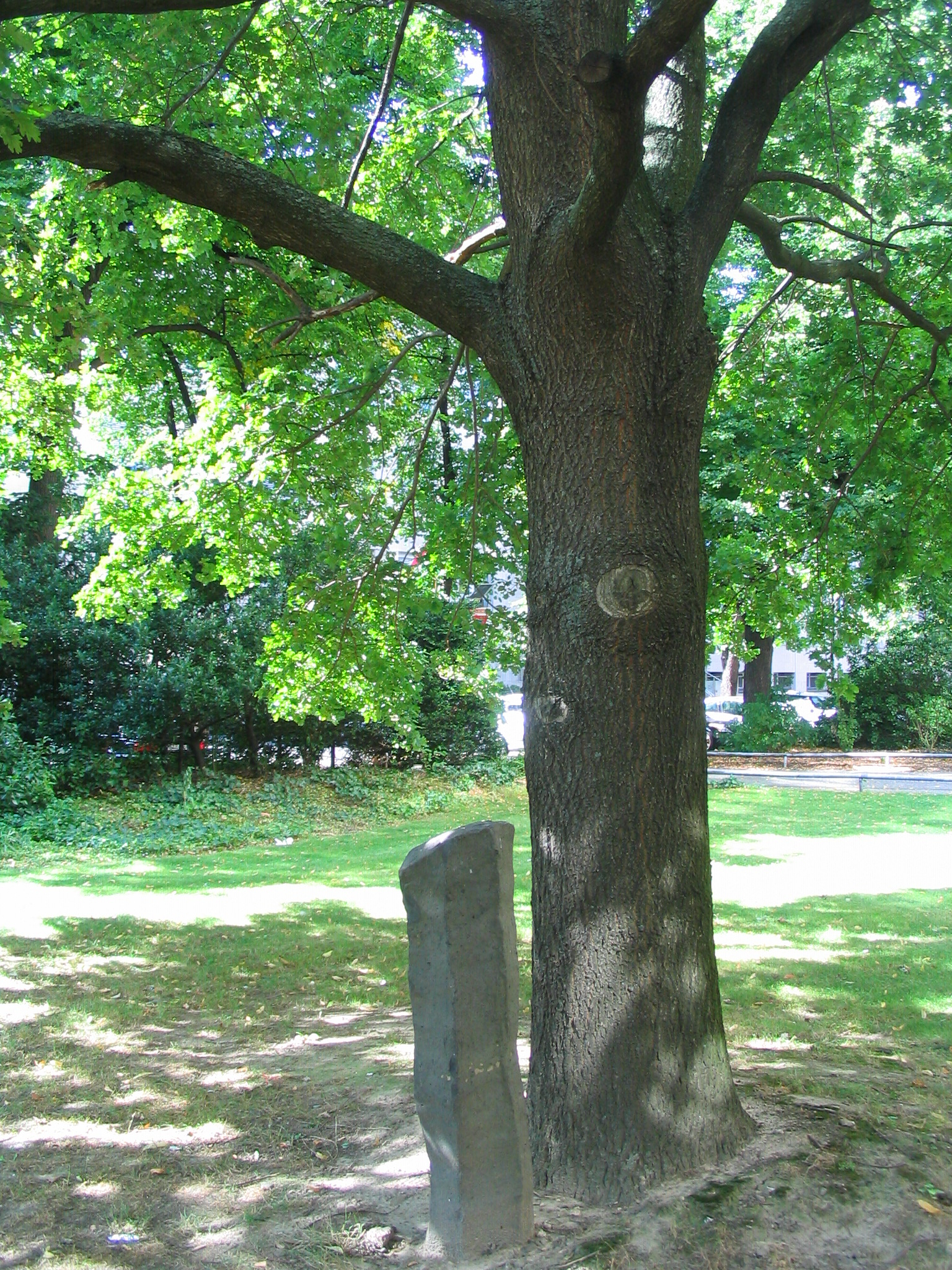
One of the oaks, circa 2008

The project was of enormous scope, and met with some controversy. While the biggest difficulty of the project was raising the money, the project had its share of opponents. Much of it was political, from the conservative state government dominated by the Christian Democrats. (The mayor of Kassel was a social democrat who stood by Beuys). Some people thought the black stone markers were ugly, even piling pink stones on the sites in 1982 as a prank. Also, a motorcyclist had died as a result of one of the stone markers. However, as more trees were planted people's perception of the project as a parking lot destroyer had met with increasing tolerance.

I think the tree is an element of regeneration which in itself is a concept of time. The oak is especially so because it is a slowly growing tree with a kind of really solid heart wood. It has always been a form of sculpture, a symbol for this planet ever since the Druids, who are called after the oak. Druid means oak. They used their oaks to define their holy places. I can see such a use for the future .... The tree planting enterprise provides a very simple but radical possibility for this when we start with the seven thousand oaks.

— Joseph Beuys in conversation with Richard Demarco (1982)

"The planting of seven thousand oak trees is only a symbolic beginning. Contrary to its initiative, progressive features such a symbolic beginning requires a marker, in this instance a basalt column. Future goals for the project included: a) an ongoing scheme of tree planting to be extended throughout the world as part of a global mission to effect environmental & social change "the purpose of educational activities"; b) a growth of awareness within the urban environment of the human dependence on the larger ecosystem educational outreach; and c) an ongoing process whereby the society would be activated by means of human creative will social sculpture."

"I not only want to stimulate people, I want to provoke them." (Bastian, Heines and Jeannot Simmen, "Interview with Joseph Beuys," in the catalog exhibition, Joseph Beuys, Drawings, Victoria and Albert Museum, Westerham Press, 1983, no folio)

It is a movement from the tradition, the expected, and the established for an inclusive openness. Completed in 1987 by his son, Wenzel, on the first anniversary of his father's death (and included in documenta 8), the project is still maintained by the city.

=== Legacy ===
Beuys' 7000 Oaks work is an example of the thread that links the Situationist International's approach to art and its re-creation by new groups continues to evolve through a new generation of socially conscious organizations that merge art, education, and environmental issues in their work. In 2000, the Center for Art, Design and Visual Culture (out of the University of Maryland, Baltimore County) developed the Joseph Beuys Sculpture Park and Joseph Beuys Tree Partnership and planted over 350 trees in various parks in Baltimore Parks with the help of over 500 volunteers including children from local schools. The project was organized around Beuys' philosophy that 'everyone can be an artist' by acknowledging the creativity inherent in volunteers planting trees on their own. The goal of the project was also to "extend the traditional role of the art gallery so the gallery extends out into the city". The Dia Art Foundation maintain 37 trees paired with stones in New York City and consider this installation of 7000 Oaks one of their 12 locations and sites they manage. In 2007 the artists Ackroyd & Harvey visited Kassel to collect acorns from the original oaks. 100 trees grown from these acorns were exhibited at Tate Modern in London, UK in 2021.

== See also ==
- Vacant Lot of Cabbages 1978 - Nature, food garden, indigenous forest as art in the CBD
- 1982 in art
- The Letters of Utrecht
- Living sculpture
- Social sculpture

== Bibliography ==
- Beuys, Joseph; Blume, Bernhard; Rappmann, Rainer (2006). Gespräche über Bäume. Wangen FIU-Verlag. ISBN 978-3-928780-11-7.
