= Rudi Tröger =

German painter and academic (1929–2025)

- Born: 12 October 1929; Marktleuthen, Bavaria, Germany
- Died: 2 December 2025 (aged 96)
- Occupations: Painter, university professor

Rudi Tröger (12 October 1929 – 2 December 2025) was a German painter and academic. From 1967 to 1992, he was a professor for painting art at the Academy of Fine Arts, Munich.

== Background ==
In his early years, Tröger received since 1946 private painting and drawing lessons by the German painter Wilhelm Beindorf in his home village Marktleuthen. Due to these early student years, he had the privilege of a first and basic artistic education. Tröger: "For myself this time was a gift, it was inspiring and important."

In the year 1949, Tröger moved to Munich and studied until 1957 at the Academy of Fine Arts, Munich. His professors were Hans Gött and Erich Glette. Since these years he was also active as an independent artist. In 1967, he was appointed a professor at the Academy of Fine Arts, Munich. He taught for 25 years until 1992. His students were, amongst others, Peter Casagrande, Wolfgang Eberlein, Cornelia Eichacker, Paul Havermann, Martin Gensbaur, Christoph Kern, Gerhard Merz, German Stegmaier, Horst Thürheimer und Richard Vogl. In the year 1977, Tröger was elected a regular member of the Bayerische Akademie der Schönen Künste in Munich.

Relatively late he presented his own artworks to the public: in 1977 the first exhibition of his paintings and drawings out of the years from 1963 to 1976 took place. Hermann Kern, later director of the Haus der Kunst in Munich, organized the show at the Kunstraum München. Since the 1980s Tröger was represented by the Gallery Fred Jahn in Munich. In the 1990s and 2000s, numerous nationwide and international exhibitions followed, including in Munich, Berlin, Zürich, Saint Petersburg, and New York. Since 2006, ten of the artist's large garden paintings adorn the Hubertussaal in the Nymphenburg Palace in Munich.

Tröger lived and worked from the 1970s in the area of Dachau, in the north-west of Munich. He died on 2 December 2025, at the age of 96.

== Art, work and style ==
"Landscape, portrait, and still life are the subjects that Rudi Tröger is working on since the early 1960s. Classical themes that still determine his work today," art historian Michael Semff sums up Tröger's oeuvre. On plus the artist is also well known for his studies of bathers. The transitions between the individual genres are fluid. Still lifes in his works are partly depicted in front of landscapes, garden paintings show an open transition to wide landscapes. His painting style is described as both representational and expressive, both realistic and abstract. In this respect, it is difficult to assign Tröger to a particular art movement. The art historian Bärbel Schäfer describes Tröger as a border crosser between the worlds: His art conjures up poetry and melancholy, depicts beauty and broken illusions, expresses harmony, loneliness and the loss of man, his exposure to the world.

Pictorial themes such as still lifes, landscapes and bathing figures by the French painter Paul Cézanne influenced his artistic work, as did the works of Adolf Hölzel and Oskar Coester. Although Tröger perceived the Informalism that unfolded in the 1950s, he continued on his own path as an artist. Between 1965 and 1968, Tröger produced also a notable printmaking work alongside his paintings.

Tröger favours the withdrawn work as an artist and intensive examination of the painting process but shuns the great stage of the art world. Thus, for him, the process of creating is fundamentally more important than the result. His creative process is characterized by repeated revisions and interruptions. Tröger is not only interested in figuration in itself, but in the metamorphosis of visual experience into a pictorial idea.

== Honours ==
- 1977: Member of the Bayerische Akademie der Schönen Künste
- 1993: Kunstpreis der Landeshauptstadt München
- 1993: Friedrich-Baur-Preis for Visual Art
- 2013: Kulturpreis Bayern for Painting

== Public and private collections ==
Numerous of the artist's works are in the possession of public institutions such as the Pinakothek der Moderne, the Staatliche Graphische Sammlung in Munich (Bayerische Staatsgemäldesammlungen) and the Städtische Galerie im Lenbachhaus in Munich. The British Museum in London, England, the Saint Louis Art Museum in Saint Louis, USA and the Museum of Modern Art in New York City, US own lithographs and etchings by the artist as well.

In addition, Tröger's works are represented in renowned private collections, such as the former art collection of the German-American businessman Walter Bareiss, the art collection of Christian Graf Dürckheim and the collection of H. R. H. Herzog Franz von Bayern, who describes Tröger's works as among the most important works of art in his collection.

== Exhibitions ==
- 1977: Bilder und Zeichnungen 1963 bis 1976. Kunstraum, Munich
- 1983/1984: Bilder und Zeichnungen 1982 bis 1983. Galerie Tanit, Munich
- 1985: Druckgraphik 1965 bis 1968. Galerie Fred Jahn, Munich
- 1987: Zeichnungen 1957 bis 1985. Städtisches Museum Leverkusen, Schloss Morsbroich
- 1987: Druckgraphik. Städtische Galerie im Cordonhaus, Cham
- 1988: Bilder 1959 bis 1987. Villa Stuck, Munich
- 1989: Rudi Tröger. Bayerische Akademie der Schönen Künste, Munich
- 1990: Wasserfarben 1963 bis 1967. Galerie Jahn und Fusban, Munich
- 1993: Badebilder. Galerie Fred Jahn, Munich
- 1993: Figuren und Stilleben in der Landschaft. Bilder, Zeichnungen und Grafiken. Galerie Zell am See, Schloss Rosenberg, Austria
- 1994: Bildnisse. Bayerische Akademie der Schönen Künste, Munich
- 1994: Bilder 1963 bis 1993. Galerie im Rathaus, Kulturreferat der Landeshauptstadt, Munich
- 1994: Landschaftsbilder. Galerie Fred Jahn, Munich
- 1994: Druckgraphik 1964 bis 1968. Neue Galerie, Dachau
- 1994: Gemälde. Tiroler Kunstpavillon, Innsbruck, Austria
- 1994: Zeichnungen. Galerie im Stadtturm, Innsbruck, Austria
- 1995: Rudi Tröger und Katharina von Werz. Saint Petersburg Stieglitz State Academy of Art and Design, Sankt Petersburg, Russia
- 1996: A Personal History in Portraits 1963 bis 1993. Nolan / Eckman Gallery, New York, USA
- 1997: Bildnisse und Figuren 1963 bis 1993. Galerie Fred Jahn, Munich
- 1999: Arbeiten auf Papier. Staatliche Graphische Sammlung, Munich
- 1999: Arbeiten auf Papier. Galerie Zell am See, Schloss Rosenberg, Zell am See, Austria
- 1999: Wasserfarben 1995 bis 1997. Galerie Fred Jahn, Munich
- 2000: Radierungen und Lithographien. Galerie Fred Jahn Studio, Munich
- 2002: Stilleben 1963 bis 2002. Galerie Fred Jahn, Munich
- 2004: Pastelle. Galerie Fred Jahn, Munich
- 2006: Gartenbilder. Kunstmuseum Dieselkraftwerk, Cottbus
- 2006: Gartenbilder. Bayerische Akademie der Schönen Künste, Munich
- 2006: Bilder und Gouachen. Völcker & Freunde, Berlin
- 2007: Bilder und Arbeiten auf Papier. Galerie Josephski – Neukum, Issing am Ammersee
- 2008/2009: Zeichnen und Malen.Galerie Rolf Ohse, Bremen
- 2009: Heinz Butz und Rudi Tröger. Galerie Lelong, Zürich, Switzerland
- 2010: Bilder und Arbeiten auf Papier 1958 bis 2008. Schönewald Fine Arts, Düsseldorf
- 2010: Rudi Tröger. Galerie Maier, Innsbruck, Austria
- 2010/2011: Maler der Akademie. Bayerische Akademie der Schönen Künste, Munich
- 2012: Bildnisse 1960 bis 2000. Galerie Fred Jahn, Munich
- 2013: Werke 1960 bis 2012. Schloss Dachau, Dachau
- 2014: Blumenbilder. Galerie Fred Jahn, Munich
- 2016: Bilder 1960 bis 2016. Karl & Faber, Munich und Galerie Fred Jahn, Munich
- 2018: Rudi Tröger. Galerie Michael Haas, Berlin
- 2019: Rudi Tröger. Malerei 1956–2018. Galerie Jahn und Jahn, München
- 2021: Julius Heinemann, Rudi Tröger. Silent Encounter. Galerie Jahn und Jahn, München
- 2023: Rudi Tröger. Ausblicke und Innenschau. Kunsthaus Kaufbeuren

== Literature ==
- Bilder und Zeichnungen 1963 – 1976. (1977). Hermann Kern und Rudi Tröger. Kunstraum, München.
- Druckgraphik 1965 – 1968. (1985). Rudi Tröger. Verlag Fred Jahn. Galerie Fred Jahn, München.
- Zeichnungen 1957–1985. (1987). Rudi Tröger. Verlag Fred Jahn. Galerie Fred Jahn, München.
- Bilder 1959 – 1987. (1988). Rudi Tröger. Verlag Fred Jahn. Villa Stuck, München.
- Wasserfarben 1963 – 1967. (1990). Rudi Tröger. Verlag Fred Jahn. Galerie Jahn und Fusban, München.
- Badebilder. (1993). Rudi Tröger. Verlag Fred Jahn. Galerie Fred Jahn, München.
- Landschaftsbilder. (1994). Rudi Tröger. Verlag Fred Jahn. Galerie Fred Jahn, München.
- Wasserfarben 1995 – 1997. (1999). Rudi Tröger. Verlag Fred Jahn. Galerie Fred Jahn, München.
- Arbeiten auf Papier. (1999). Rudi Tröger. Staatliche Graphische Sammlung, München.
- Stilleben 1963 – 2002. (2002). Rudi Tröger. Verlag Fred Jahn. Galerie Fred Jahn, München.
- Pastelle. (2004). Rudi Tröger. Verlag Fred Jahn. Galerie Fred Jahn, München.
- Gartenbilder. (2006). Rudi Tröger. Kunstmuseum Dieselkraftwerk, Cottbus.
- Bilder, Aquarelle, Zeichnungen. (2007). Karl Bohrmann | Heinz Butz | Erwin Pfrang | Friedrich G. Scheuer | Rudi Tröger | Katharina von Werz. Karl & Faber, München und Galerie Fred Jahn, München.
- Bilder 1958 – 1974. (2009). Rudi Tröger. Galerie Fred Jahn, München.
- Bilder und Arbeiten auf Papier 1958 – 2008. (2010). Rudi Tröger. Schönewald Fine Arts, Düsseldorf.
- Landschaften. (2010). Georg Baselitz | Karl Bohrmann | Heinz Butz | Günther Förg | George Grosz | Per Kirkeby | Markus Lüpertz | Otto Modersohn | Kirsten Ortwed | Norbert Tadeusz | Rudi Tröger. Karl & Faber, München und Galerie Fred Jahn, München.
- Bildnis und Figur. (2011). Oskar Coester | Frank Günzel | Walter Klose | Erwin Pfrang | Rudi Tröger | Katharina von Werz. Karl & Faber, München und Galerie Fred Jahn, München.
- Rudi Tröger. Werke 1960 – 2012. (2013). Rudi Tröger. Kunst und Bank 5, Volksbank Raiffeisenbank Dachau eG, Schloss Dachau.
- Rudi Tröger. (2018). Galerie Michael Haas, Berlin.
