= Marktleuthen =

- Town
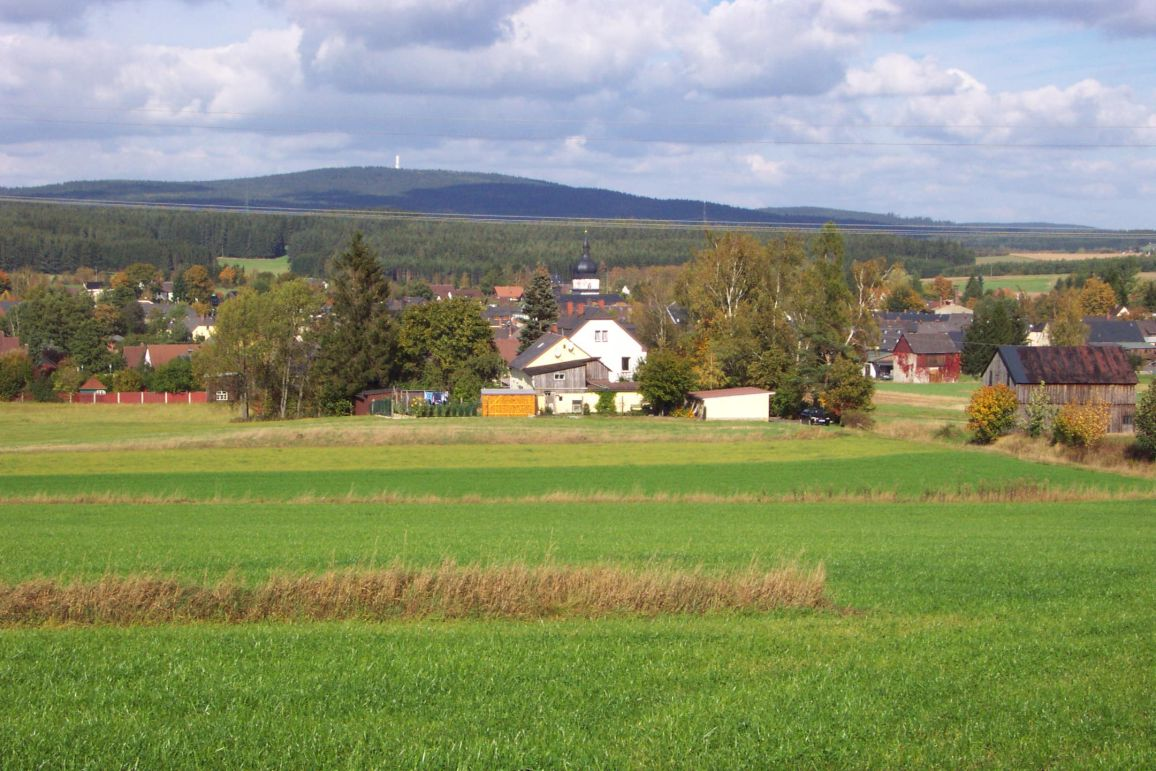
- Marktleuthen

- Coat of arms

- Location of Marktleuthen within Wunsiedel im Fichtelgebirge district
- Interactive map of Marktleuthen
- Location within Germany Location within Bavaria
- Coordinates: 50°7′N 12°0′E
- Country: Germany
- State: Bavaria
- Admin. region: Oberfranken
- District: Wunsiedel im Fichtelgebirge
- Subdivisions: 10 Ortsteile

Government
  - Mayor (2020–26): Sabrina Kaestner (CSU)

Area
  - Total: 35.48 km^{2} (13.70 sq mi)
- Elevation: 529 m (1,736 ft)

Population (2025-12-31)
  - Total: 2,762
  - Density: 77.85/km^{2} (201.6/sq mi)
- Time zone: UTC+01:00 (CET)
  - Summer (DST): UTC+02:00 (CEST)
- Postal codes: 95168
- Dialling codes: 09285
- Vehicle registration: WUN
- Website: www.marktleuthen.de

Marktleuthen (German: [maʁktˈlɔʏtn̩]) is a municipality in the district of Wunsiedel, in Bavaria, Germany. It is situated on the river Eger, 10 km north of Wunsiedel and 11 km southwest of Selb.

== Transportation ==
The town has a train station and lies on the Regensburg-Hof railway.

== People ==
- Rudi Tröger (1929-2025), German painter
