= Free International University =

Defunct university founded in 1973

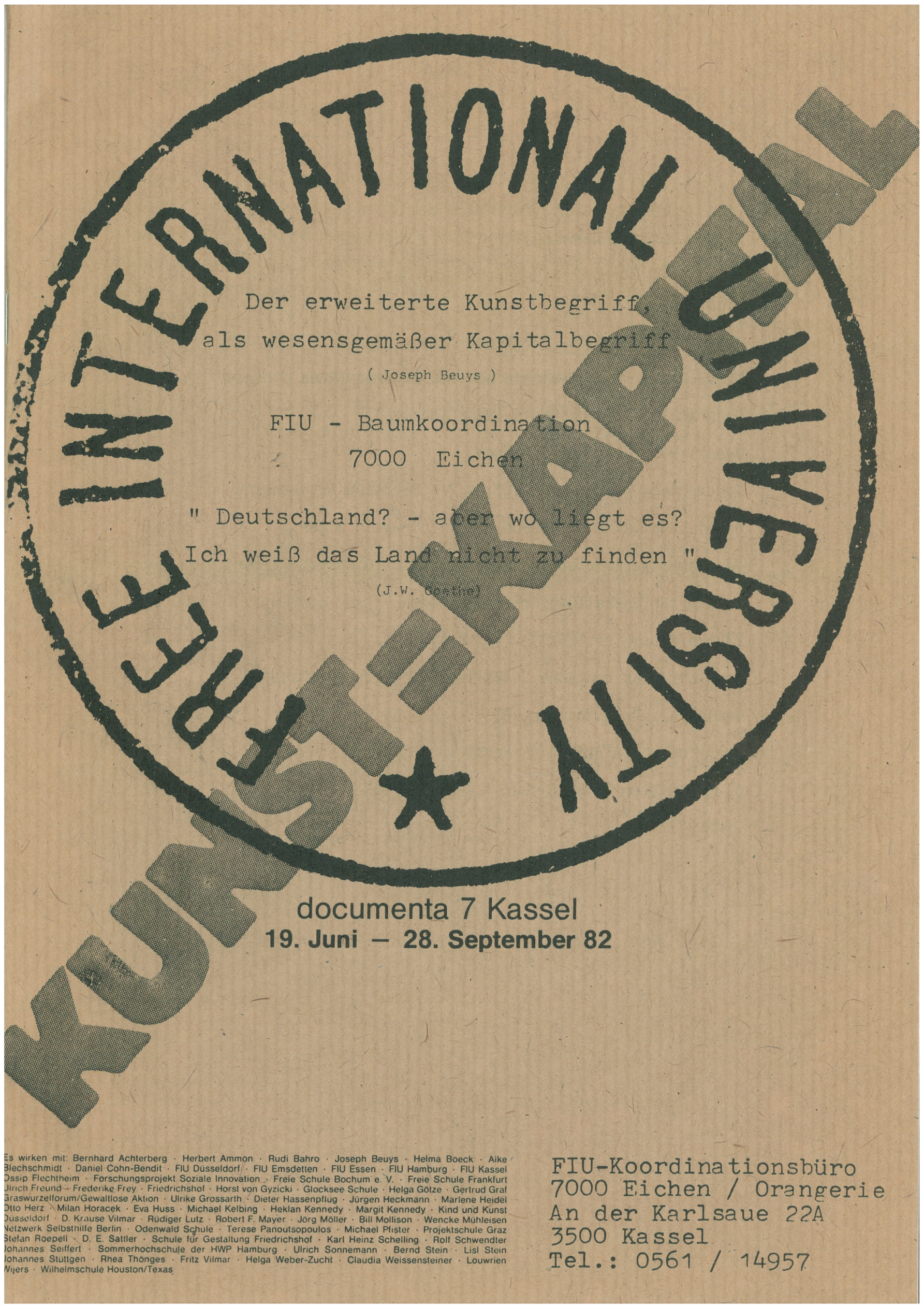
Title page of the Free International University's event program for documenta 7

The Free International University (FIU) for Creativity and Interdisciplinary Research was a support organization founded by the German artist Joseph Beuys. He founded it together with writer Heinrich Böll, Klaus Staeck (1st chairman), Georg Meistermann (2nd chairman) and Willi Bongard (secretary), Caroline Tisdall and Robert McDowell who wrote the FIU's feasibility report for the EC's Ralph Dahrendorf, and Enrico Wolleb, R.D. Laing, Tapio Varis, Dorothy Walker, Conrad Atkinson, Dr. Rhea Thöngens, and many others, based on principles laid down in a manifesto written by Joseph Beuys and Heinrich Böll and the 1975/6 feasibility study by art critic Caroline Tisdall. It was founded as a "organizational place of research, work, and communication" to ponder the future of society including political-economy. As a free University it was intended to supplement the state educational system with interdisciplinary work and cooperation between the sciences and the arts while at the same time campaigning for legal equality within educational systems.

The FIU was founded on 27 April 1973 in the Düsseldorf studio of Joseph Beuys. Major presentations of FIU occurred in Kassel Documenta (1977 & 1982), London Battersea Arts Centre (1978), Guggenheim Museum Gallery New York (1979), Edinburgh Festival (1974, 1976, 1980), Abruzzo Italy (1984), plus conferences in Erice Sicily (1975), Cambridge (1978), and others.

The Free International University was revisited and taken further by various people and groups, including in Edinburgh (Demarco Foundation and Summerhall), Belfast (Troubled Image Group and Art & Research Exchange), and London by Robert McDowell, Richard Demarco, and Caroline Tisdall, by Renee Block, the author Rainer Rappmann under the FIU-Verlag and the F.I.U.s in Amsterdam, see: FIU-amsterdam, Antwerp, Gelsenkirchen, Hamburg, and Munich, which were begun by students of Beuys. They also include the organization Mehr Demokratie e.V. and the Omnibus for direct Democracy.

== See also ==
- Social sculpture
