= Center for Art, Design and Visual Culture =

Gallery at the University of Maryland

Coordinates: 39°15′18″N 76°42′48″W

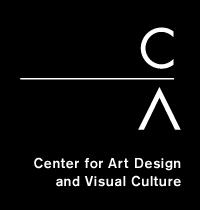
- Established: 1989
- Location: University of Maryland, Baltimore County; Baltimore, Maryland
- Director: Symmes Gardner
- Public transit access: 77
- Website: www.umbc.edu/cadvc/

The Center for Art, Design and Visual Culture (CADVC) was established in 1989 as the Fine Art Gallery at the University of Maryland, Baltimore County. The center is the university's prime exhibition location where students, professors, staff and the public can experience visual culture along with cultural and aesthetic issues. CADVC is a non-profit organization that also publishes media related to the arts.

The center includes a traveling exhibition program that features work from prominent museums such as the Andy Warhol Museum, New Museum of Contemporary Art, and the International Center of Photography. Other programs include a publication program, a k-12 educational outreach program with Baltimore City and Baltimore County, a campus education initiative, and the UMBC Sculpture Park and Outreach Program.

CADVC also administers the Joseph Beuys Sculpture Park on the UMBC campus.

== Gallery ==
The gallery consists of 4,200 square feet, and is located in the Fine Arts Building on campus. The Albin O. Kuhn Library & Gallery includes another gallery space that is often used for student exhibitions.
