= Christa-Maria Lerm Hayes =

German-Irish-Dutch art historian

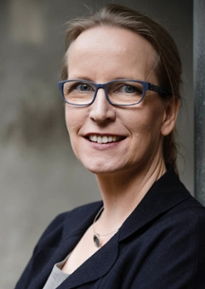
- Born: 1967 (age 58–59); Jena, East Germany

Christa-Maria Lerm Hayes (born 1967) is a German-Irish art historian, who works as the professor and chair of modern and contemporary art history at the University of Amsterdam.

== Early life and education ==
Lerm Hayes completed her PhD at the University of Cologne on Joseph Beuys (under Prof.Dr. Antje von Graevenitz) in 2001. She was Zurich James Joyce Foundation Scholar and Post-Doctoral Research Fellow of the Irish Research Council at University College Dublin in 2001–03. She spent many years in Ireland and showed how artists have read and interpreted James Joyce in her book Joyce in art : visual art inspired by James Joyce.

== Career ==
Between 2003 and 2014 she worked at the Ulster University in Belfast, where she progressed from Lecturer to Reader and Professor of Iconology. She led the Research Graduate School of the Faculty of Art, Design and the Built Environment and supervised many PhD projects (including those with practice). She was active in the Northern Irish art world, serving on the Boards of the Metropolitan Arts Centre, CCA Derry and Bbeyond performance art collective. She paid attention to the legacy of Beuys in Ireland, which she found in its artist-led initiatives and performance art. Linking her fields of interest, she also wrote about Post-War Germany and ‘Objective Chance’: W.G. Sebald, Joseph Beuys and Tacita Dean.

She has curated exhibitions in many countries (Ireland, South Korea, Russia, France, Netherlands), often in the area of 'literary art exhibitions', which she has conceptualised from Joyce in Art at the Royal Hibernian Academy in Dublin in 2004, to Convergence: Literary Art Exhibitions, in Belfast and Limerick in 2011. Her recent curatorial projects have taken on performative or social practice characteristics, such as Strijd ∞, which is a collaboration with her students at the University of Amsterdam, and Equilibrium? which was commissioned by the democratization initiative Politics plus and entailed a workshop for the elected members of the Northern Ireland Assembly.

== Works ==
- Joyce In Art: Visual Art Inspired By James Joyce, 2004
- Post-War Germany and ‘Objective Chance’: W. G. Sebald, Joseph Beuys and Tacita Dean, 2011
- Brian O'Doherty/Patrick Ireland: Word, Image and Institutional Critique, 2017
