= San Antonio Island =

Small island in the Ebro Delta, Spain

Coordinates: 40°43′25″N 0°52′15″E

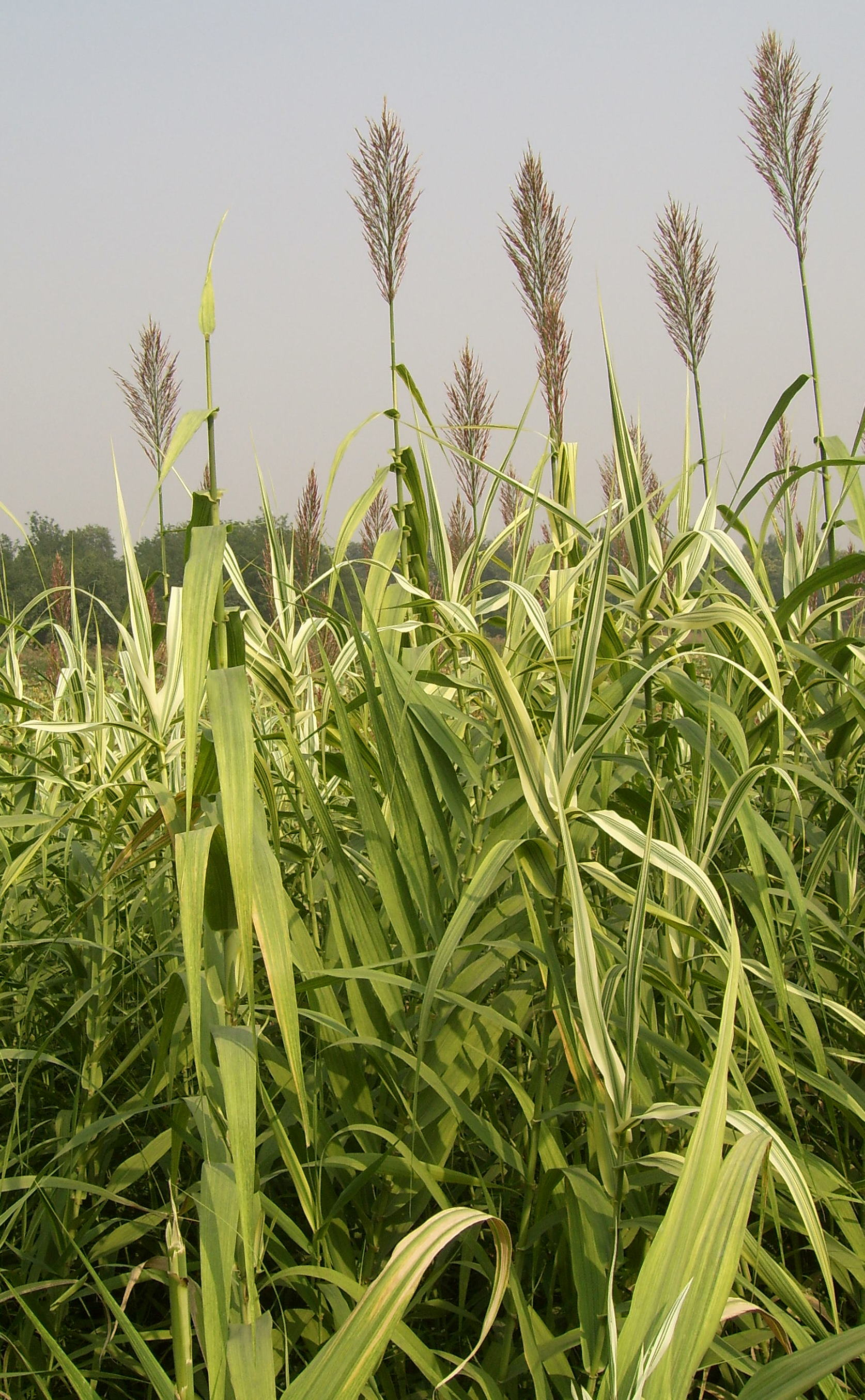
San Antonio Island vegetation

San Antonio Island (Spanish: Isla de San Antonio; Catalan: Illa de Sant Antoni) is an island located in the eastern part of the Ebro Delta, belonging to the municipality of Deltebre, Catalonia, Spain. The island has an area of approximately 140 hectares (350 acres).

The island consists of dunes and marshes and has a very rich biodiversity. San Antonio Island and nearby Buda Island are protected areas included in Delta del Ebro Natural Park.
