= Social sculpture =

Expanded concept of art

Social sculpture is a phrase used to describe an expanded concept of art that was invented by the artist and founding member of the German Green Party, Joseph Beuys. Beuys created the term "social sculpture" to embody his understanding of art's potential to transform society. As a work of art, a social sculpture includes human activity that strives to structure and shape society or the environment. The central idea of a social sculptor is an artist who creates structures in society using language, thoughts, actions, and objects.

== Concept ==
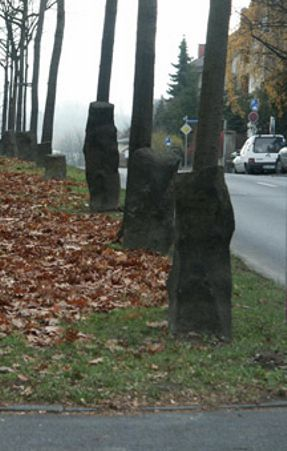
Some of the 7,000 Oaks planted between 1982 and 1987 for Documenta 7 (1982)

During the 1960s, Beuys formulated his central theoretical concepts concerning the social, cultural and political function and potential of art. Indebted to Romantic writers such as Novalis and Schiller, Beuys was motivated by a utopian belief in the power of universal human creativity and was confident in the potential for art to bring about revolutionary change. These ideas were founded in the social ideas of anthroposophy and the work of Rudolf Steiner, of which he was a vigorous and original proponent. This translated into Beuys' formulation of the concept of social sculpture, in which society as a whole was to be regarded as one great work of art (the Wagnerian Gesamtkunstwerk) to which each person can contribute creatively (perhaps Beuys' most famous phrase, borrowed from Novalis, is "Everyone is an artist"). In the video "Willoughby SHARP, Joseph Beuys, Public Dialogues (1974/120 min)", a record of Beuys' first major public discussion in the U.S., Beuys elaborates three principles: Freedom, Democracy, and Socialism, saying that each of them depends on the other two in order to be meaningful. In 1973, Beuys wrote:

"Only on condition of a radical widening of definitions will it be possible for art and activities related to art [to] provide evidence that art is now the only evolutionary-revolutionary power. Only art is capable of dismantling the repressive effects of a senile social system that continues to totter along the deathline: to dismantle in order to build ‘A SOCIAL ORGANISM AS A WORK OF ART’… EVERY HUMAN BEING IS AN ARTIST who – from his state of freedom – the position of freedom that he experiences at first-hand – learns to determine the other positions of the TOTAL ART WORK OF THE FUTURE SOCIAL ORDER."

In 1982, he was invited to create a work for Documenta 7. He delivered a large pile of basalt stones. From above, one could see that the pile of stones was a large arrow pointing to a single oak tree that he had planted. He announced that the stones should not be moved unless an oak tree was planted in the new location of the stone. 7,000 oak trees were then planted in Kassel, Germany. This project exemplified the idea that a social sculpture was defined as interdisciplinary and participatory.

In 1991, "The Thing" took its inspiration from the concept of social sculpture.

Since 1994, the Stela for Tolerance is one of the biggest projects worldwide following the concept of social sculpture.

In 2007, at Documenta 12, Kirill Preobrazhenskiy created work "Tram 4 Inner Voice Radio". His work was compared by critics with Beuys' oaks.

== Organization for direct democracy through plebiscite ==
The "Organization for direct democracy through plebiscite" was founded by the artists Joseph Beuys, Johannes Stüttgen and Karl Fastabend on June 19, 1971 in Düsseldorf as a political organization. The goal was influencing social patterns with implementing Beuys' concept of the extended notion of art and the social sculpture via political means. Today, Johannes Stüttgen spread the idea for direct democracy with the project "Omnibus".

== Individuality ==
Beuys believed everybody was an artist. He once said "every sphere of human activity, even peeling a potato can be a work of art as long as it is a conscious act," suggesting that every decision should be thought out and attempt to make or contribute to a work of art which in the end is society. Individuality and well-educated decisions are promoted in the person while the government is made of those decisions put into referendums. This point of view invites followers to humble themselves by realizing that they are an important part of a whole not only an individual.

== See also ==
- ART/MEDIA
- Classificatory disputes about art
- Conceptual architecture
- Contemporary art
- Experiments in Art and Technology
- Information art
- Installation art
- Social threefolding
- Systems art

== Sources ==
Soziale Plastik (German)

- Artnet.com, Gesamtkunstwerk Definition
- Ermen, Reinhard (2007). Joseph Beuys (in German). Reinbek near Hamburg: Rowohlt. ISBN 978-3-499-50623-9.
- www.social-sculpture.org
