= List of Dia Art Foundation locations and sites =

List of art museums and installations

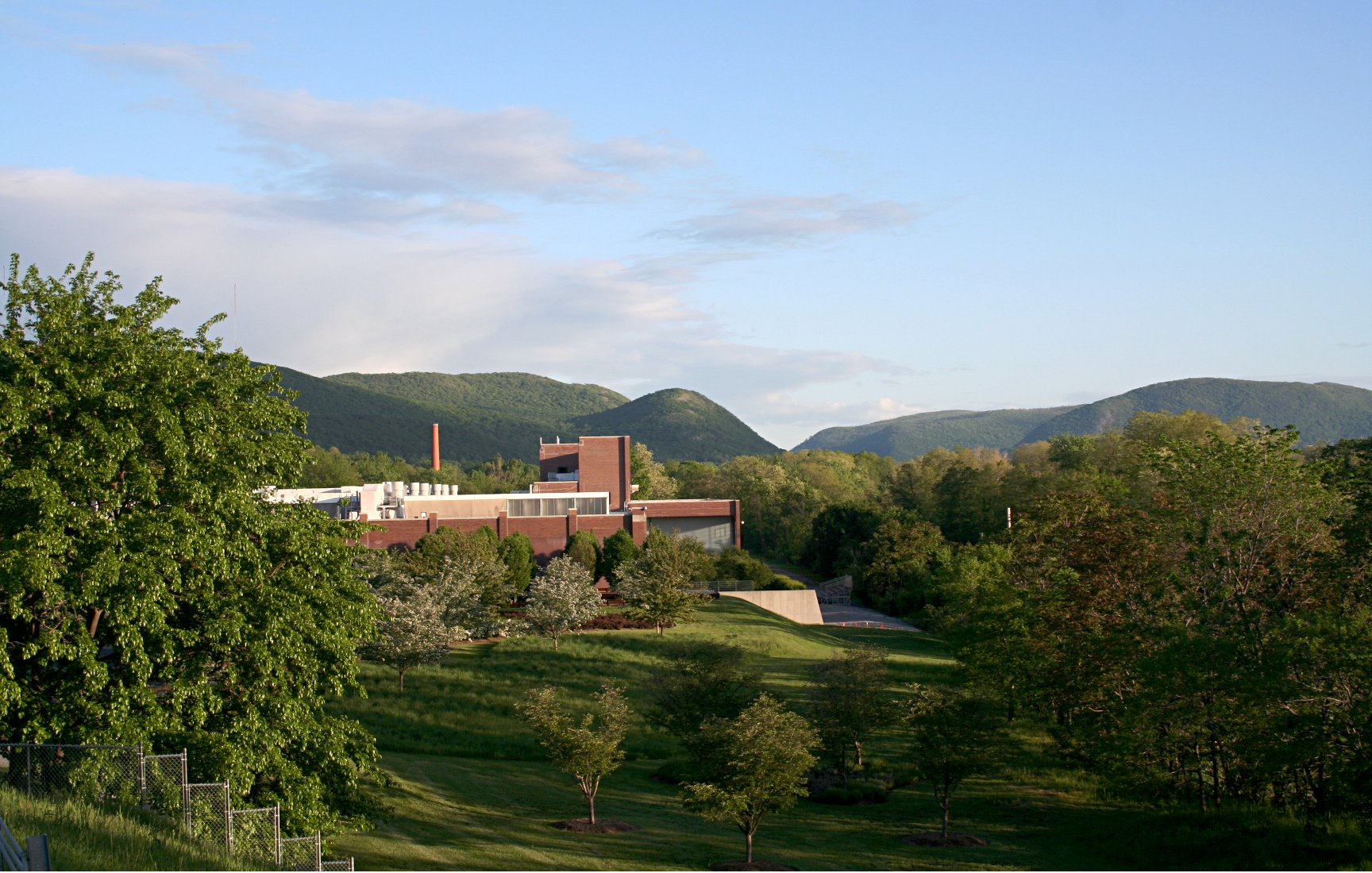
The Dia Beacon building and surrounding landscape.

There are twelve locations and sites which the Dia Art Foundation considers part of its constellation of art museums and long-term installations. Dia breaks its holdings into two distinct categories: locations and sites. "Locations" include museum structures that contain galleries of smaller works either on permanent or temporary display, while "sites" are long-term art installations placed outside of the gallery context that have been either commissioned or acquired by Dia. All three locations are found in New York state, while the nine sites are located in New York, New Mexico, Utah, South Carolina, and Germany. Currently one location, Dia SoHo, is scheduled to be opened in 2022, and there are nineteen sites that were once listed by Dia but are no longer listed.

The Dia Art Foundation was established in 1974 in New York City by the not yet married Heiner Friedrich and Schlumberger heiress Philippa de Menil, as well as Helen Winkler. They created the institution to help artists realize ambitious projects whose scale and scope is not feasible within the normal museum and gallery systems. With Friedrich and de Menil's combined large fortune, the foundation began supporting minimalist, conceptual, and land artists with, as Vanity Fair describes in an article, "stipends, studios, assistants, and archivists for the individual museums it planned to build for each of them". Beginning with a collection of warehouse spaces in New York and outdoor spaces in the American West, the foundation did not focus on constructing true museums but focused on singular artistic visions. This approach changed slightly in 1987 with the opening of Dia's first rotating exhibition space, the Dia Center for the Arts, now Dia Chelsea, on 22nd Street in New York City. Dia Beacon, a former Nabisco box factory turned into a large-scale museum for the permanent collection, opened in 2003.

The foundation began by working with and collecting the work of only twelve artists: Joseph Beuys, Walter De Maria, Dan Flavin, Donald Judd, Imi Knoebel, Blinky Palermo, Fred Sandback, James Turrell, Cy Twombly, Andy Warhol, Robert Whitman, and La Monte Young. To this day the foundation owns works by less than 50 artists, but contains a breadth and depth of their work in a way other institutions do not have the resources to maintain. Dia Director Jessica Morgan explains the relationship between Dia and its artists as, "I wouldn't use the word 'family', but these are people we're in communication with almost on a weekly basis, and in some cases we hold the vast majority of their seminal work". Known for its focus on American male minimalist, experimental, and land artists from the 1960s and 1970s, Dia's focus has been changing to include other artists from the era, largely women and Japanese artists, since Morgan became curator in 2015. This gradual refocus is markedly seen in the 2018 acquisition of Sun Tunnels by Nancy Holt, Dia's most recent addition to their list of sites.

== Locations ==
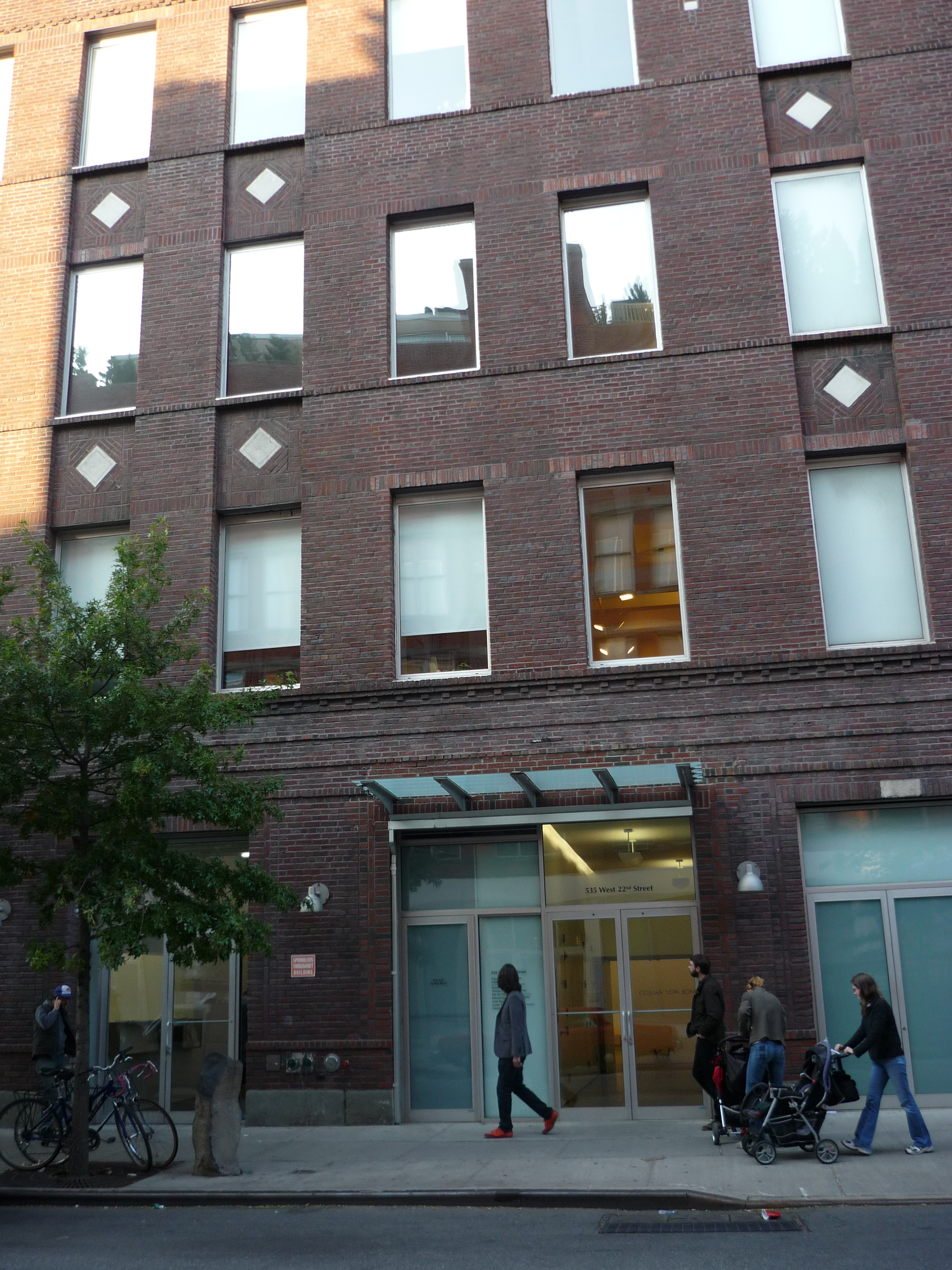
One of the three buildings that together form Dia Chelsea.

Dia maintains three locations all within New York State. These locations present galleries of work, either owned by or loaned to Dia, in temporary or permanent installations. Dia Chelsea, the first Dia location, was known as the Dia Center for the Arts from its opening in 1987 through the opening of Dia Beacon in 2003.

Location	Placement	Year opened	Description	Ref.
Dia Beacon	Beacon, New York	2003	Dia's permanent collection is housed in this former Nabisco box printing factory with each gallery designed for the presentation of a single artist's work.	
Dia Bridgehampton	Bridgehampton, New York	1979 building purchased by Dia, 1983 Dan Flavin Art Institute established 2020 renamed (Note: Dia switched from calling this the Dan Flavin Art Institute and a site, to calling it Dia Bridgehampton and a location between a November 21, 2019 and a January 29, 2020 press release.)	Home of the Dan Flavin Art Institute, nine fluorescent light works by the artist on permanent display, the former fire house and church also has a gallery for rotating exhibitions.	
Dia Chelsea	New York City, New York	1987, 2004 closed, 2015 moved and reopened, 2020 renovation and expansion	A collection of three former industrial buildings, architecturally connected during a 2020 renovation, which now hosts temporary exhibitions.	

== Sites ==
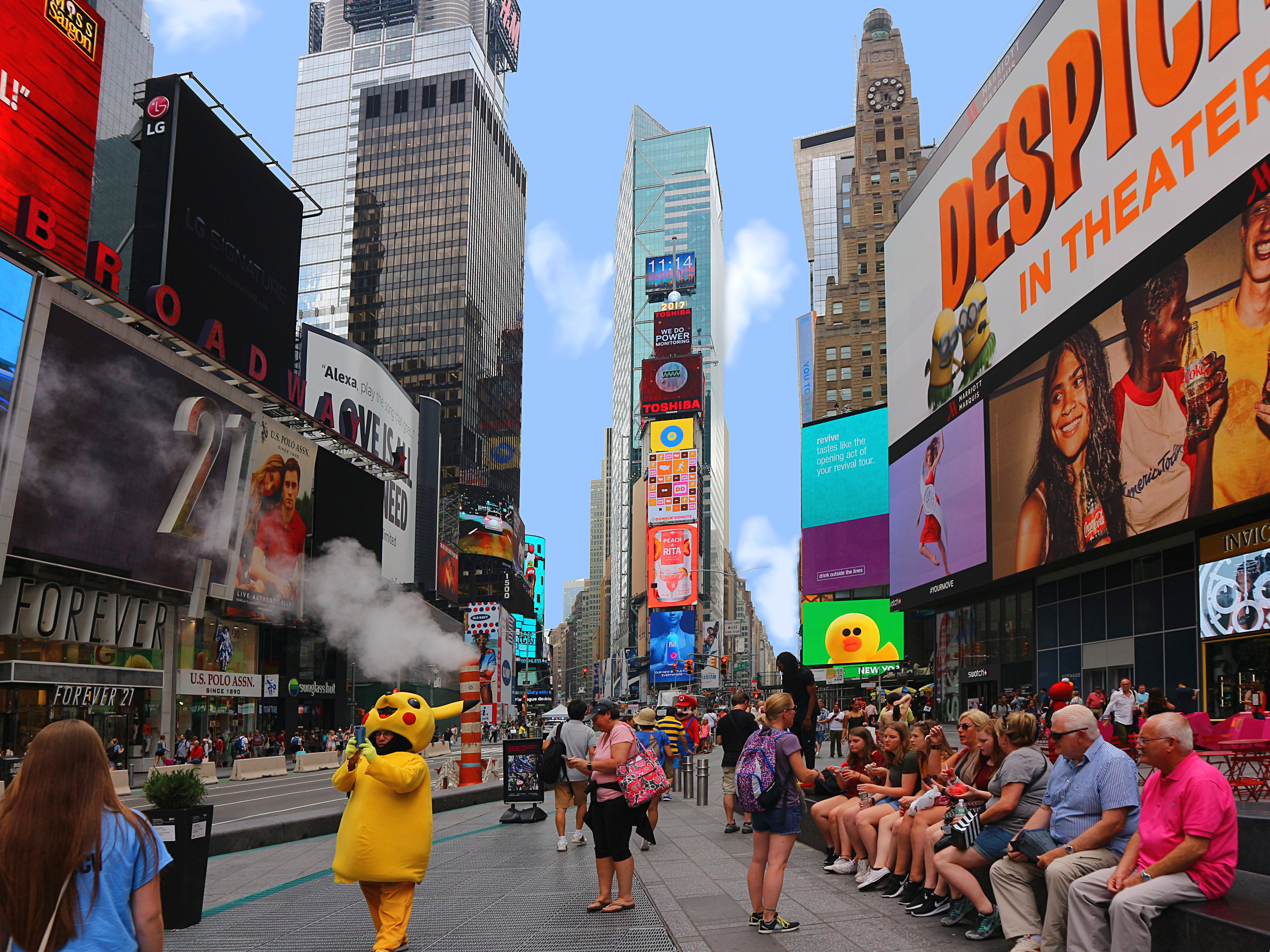
The location in Times Square where Max Neuhaus's sound art installation, Times Square, emanates.

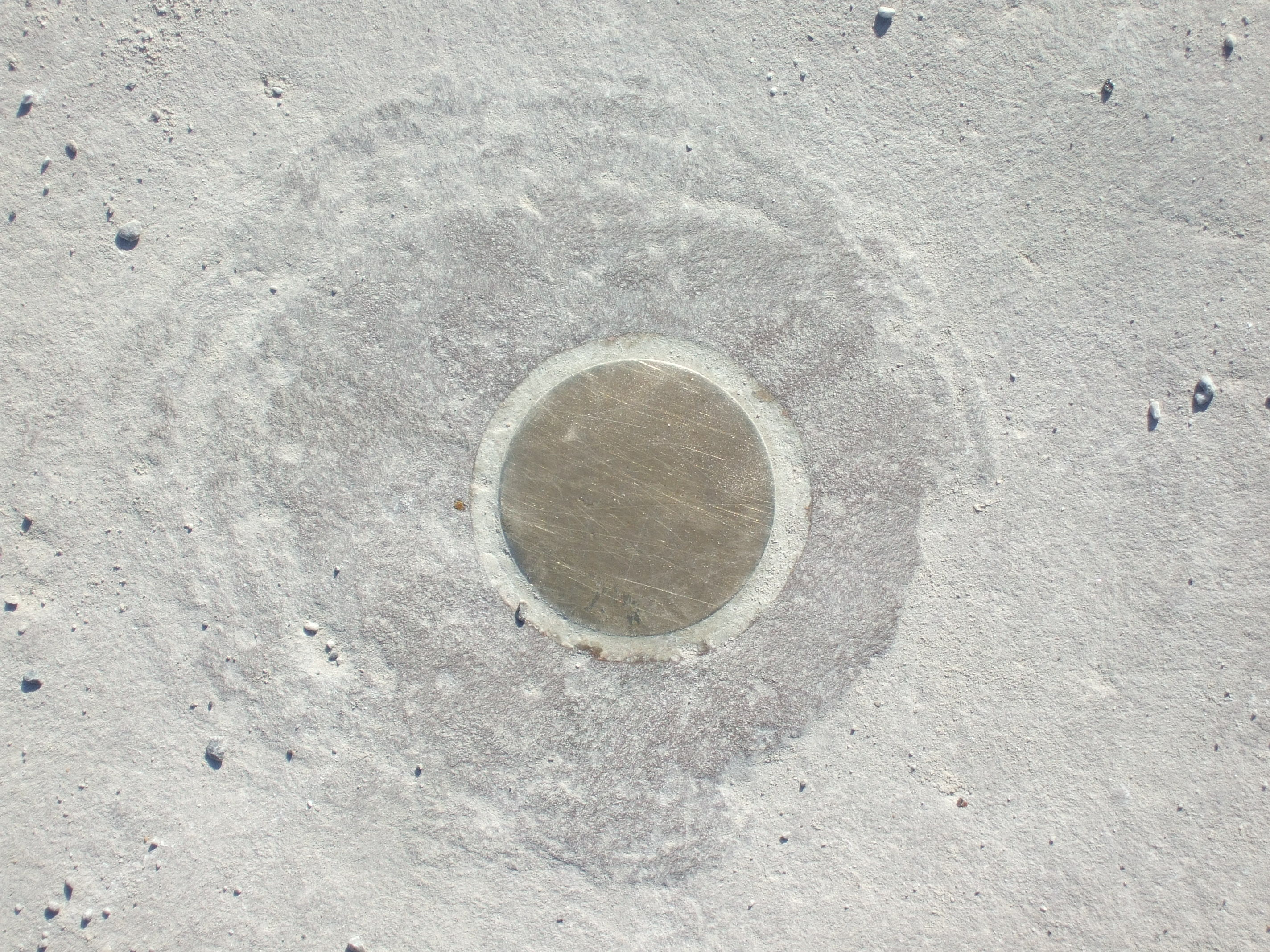
The only part of The Vertical Earth Kilometer visible above ground.

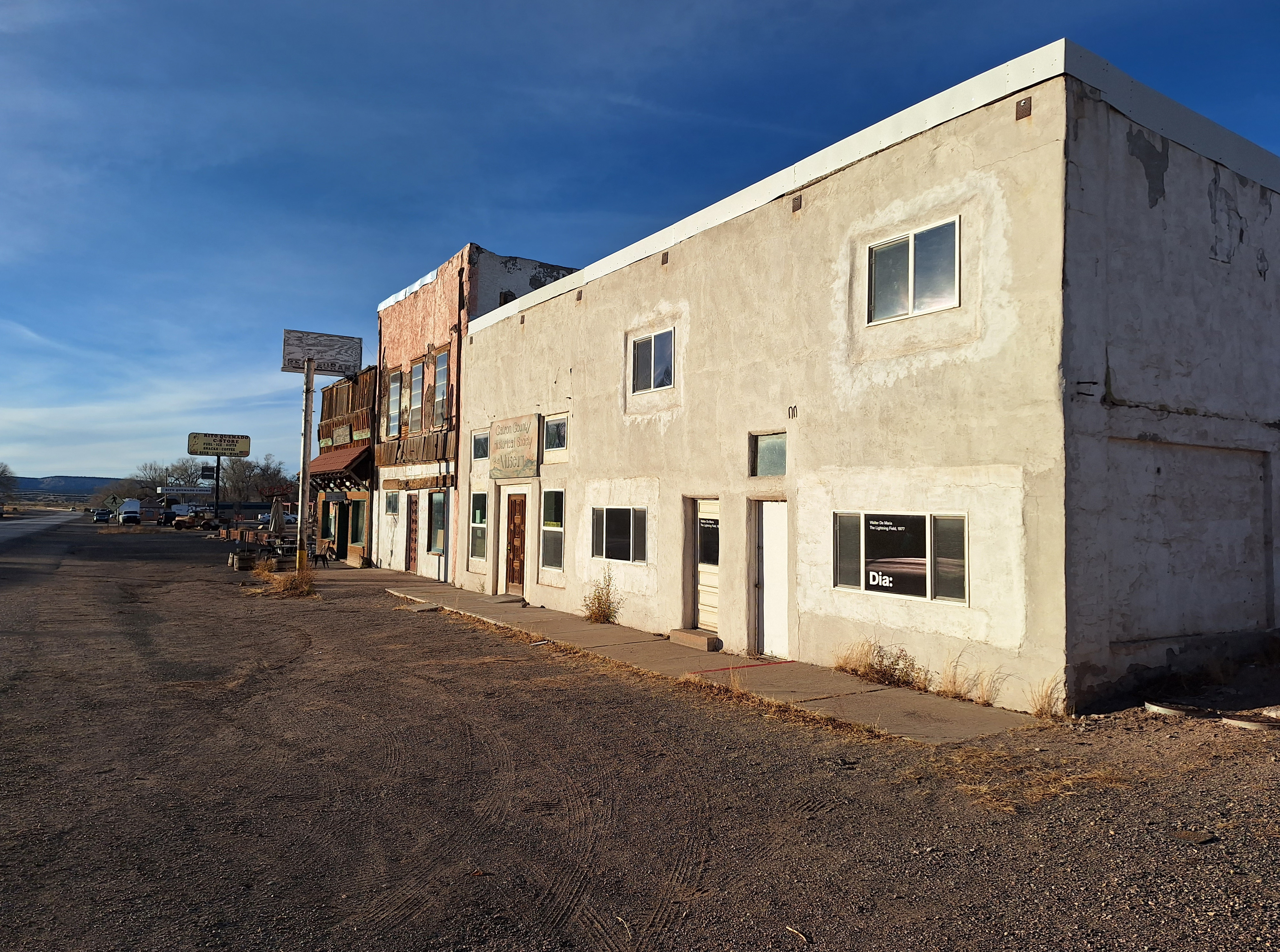
The Dia field office in Quemado, New Mexico is responsible for administering the Lightning Field.

Dia lists nine sites in its catalogue. These sites include commissions, land art, long-term art installations not in a gallery context, and site-specific installations. While focused largely in New York City and the American West, there are sites also placed internationally and elsewhere in the United States. The first sites were a trio of acquisitions and commissions by Walter De Maria in 1977 and the most recently collected site is Depreciation by Cameron Rowland, on extended loan since 2023.

Site	Artist	Placement	Year	Year acquired	Description	Ref.
7000 Oaks	Joseph Beuys	New York City, New York	1982 begun, 1988 NYC installation, 1996, 2020 expanded	1988	38 trees each paired with a roughly four foot tall basalt stone.	
Depreciation	Cameron Rowland	Edisto Island, South Carolina	2018	2023 (Note: Due to the nature of Depreciation, Dia does not own the work. It is described as being on "extended loan" and Dia claims "stewardship" of the piece.)	A restrictive covenant for 1 acre of land on the site of the former Maxcy Place plantation. The land was purchased at market value in 2018, but is now appraised at $0 due to the covenant. The land is not to be visited, but documentation is on long term display at Dia Chelsea.	
Spiral Jetty	Robert Smithson	Great Salt Lake at Rozel Point, Box Elder County, Utah	1970	1999	A 1,500-foot-long (460 m) by 16-foot-wide (4.9 m) jetty made from six thousand tons of black basalt and soil from the area arranged in spiral.	
Sun Tunnels	Nancy Holt	Great Basin Desert, Utah	1973–76	2018	Four concrete cylinders, measuring eighteen feet long by nine feet in diameter, sitting in an open cross layout and arranged to line up with the sunset on solstice days.	
The Broken Kilometer	Walter De Maria	New York City, New York	1979	1979	A grid of 500 polished brass rods, with a total length of 3,280 feet, lying on the floor and illuminated with metal-halide stadium lights.	
The Lightning Field	Walter De Maria	Quemado; New Mexico	1977	1977	400 stainless steel poles standing upright to define a horizontal plane over a one mile by one kilometer area.	
The New York Earth Room	Walter De Maria	New York City, New York	1977	1977	A 3,600 square foot room filled with 250 cubic yards of soil to a depth of 22 inches.	
The Vertical Earth Kilometer	Walter De Maria	Kassel, Germany	1977	1977	A five centimeter wide, one kilometer long brass rod inserted vertically into the earth with its top flush to the ground.	
Times Square	Max Neuhaus	New York City, New York	1977, 2002 reinstalled	2002	Sound emanating from a grate in Times Square on a triangular pedestrian island between 45th and 46th streets.	

Interactive map

Dia sites:
1 - 7000 Oaks

2 - Depreciation
3 - The Broken Kilometer
4 - The New York Earth Room
5 - Times Square
6 - Spiral Jetty
7 - Sun Tunnels
8 - The Lightning Field

9 - The Vertical Earth Kilometer

Dia locations:

A - Dia Chelsea

B - Dia Beacon

C - Dia Bridgehampton

== Former locations and sites ==
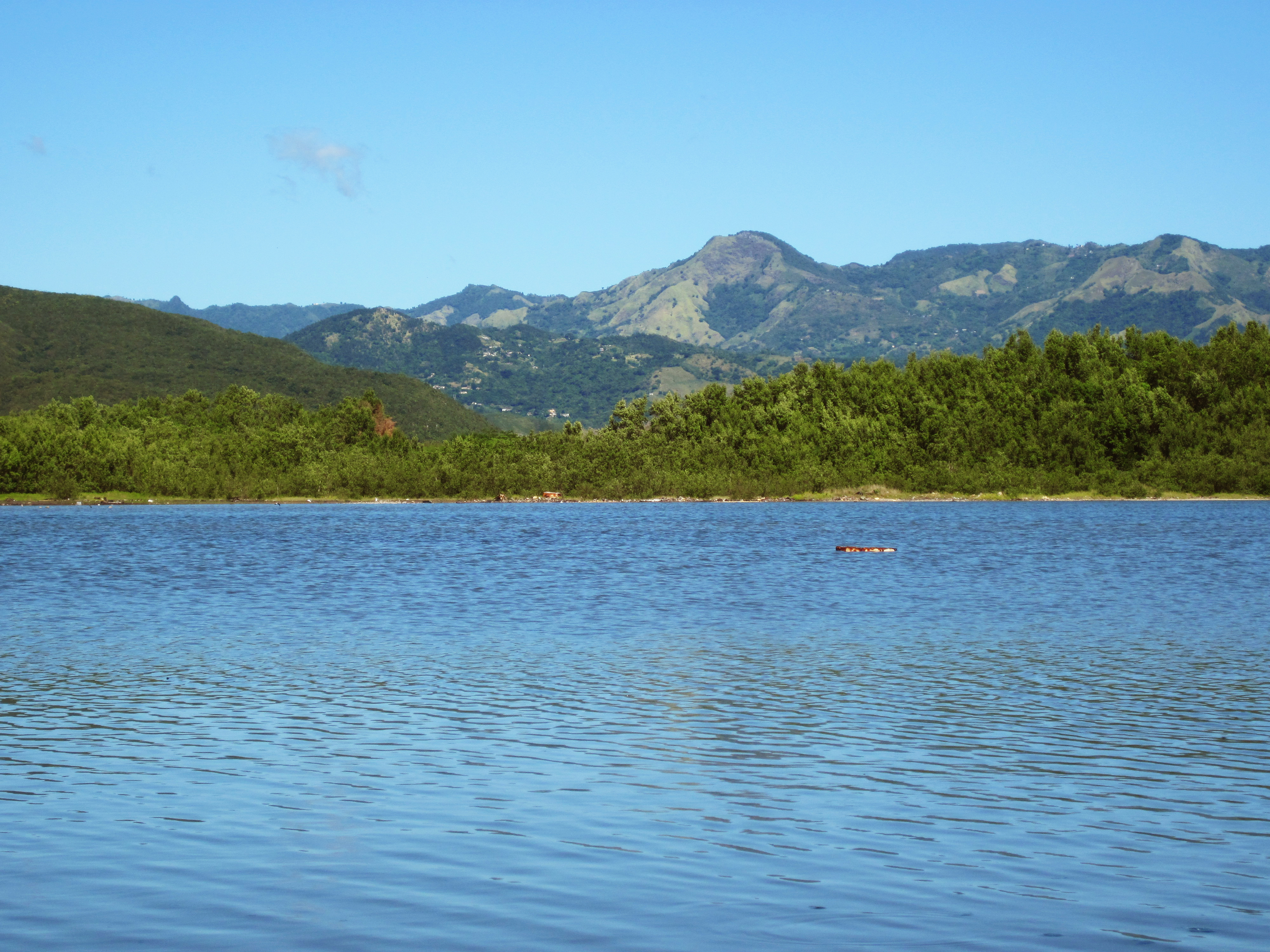
The forest surrounding Guayanilla, Puerto Rico where Puerto Rican Light (Cueva Vientos) by Jennifer Allora and Guillermo Calzadilla once stood.

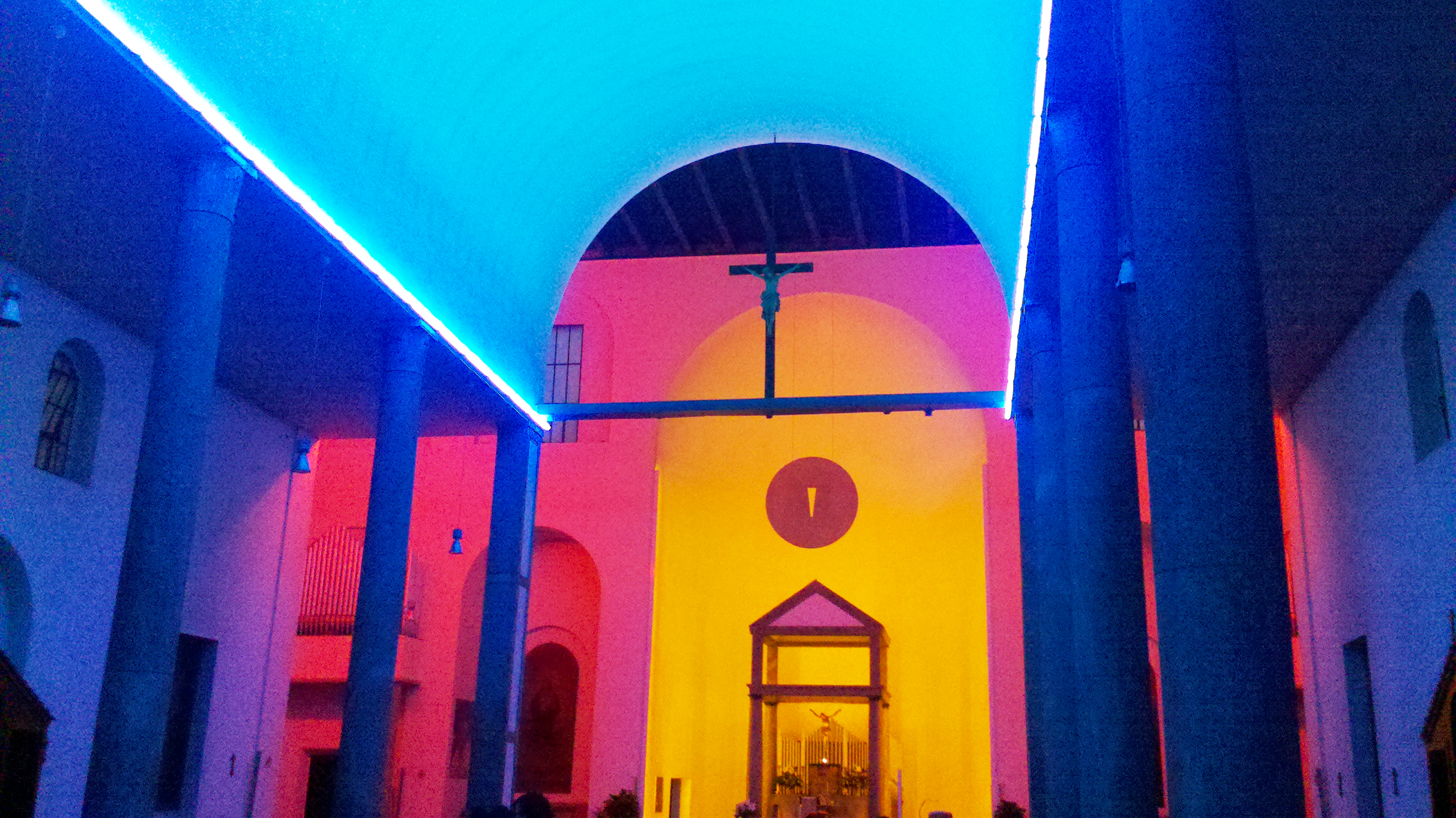
Interior of Santa Maria Annunciata in Chiesa Rossa with the fluorescent light installation by Dan Flavin.

There are multiple Dia locations, sites, or long term installations, that were once listed in Dia publications or press releases but are no longer categorized as such. These sites were not necessarily removed from view, for instance The Dan Flavin Art Institute became part of Dia Bridgehampton and Dan Flavin's Untitled (to you, Heiner, with admiration and affection) was moved from Munich, Germany to Dia Beacon. To be included in this list the location or site either is listed in the "Time Line of Locations and Sites" found in the 2021 book An Introduction to Dia's Locations and Sites edited by Kamilah N. Foreman, Matilde Guidelli-Guidi, and Sophia Larigakis, or are mentioned in a Dia press release where the locations and sites of that time are listed.

Site	Artist	Placement	Year Opened	Year removed from view	Description	Ref.
Untitled in pink, green, and blue fluorescent light	Dan Flavin	Kunstmuseum Basel, Basel, Switzerland	1975	Still on view	This permanent, outdoor, fluorescent light installation was installed by Dia and gifted to the Kunstmuseum.	
Dream Festival	La Monte Young and Marian Zazeela	New York City, New York	1975	1979	Dia gave Young and Zazeela a ten-year commission to produce this festival. presented within Dream House environment, the festival presented the American premier of Young's The Well-Tuned Piano as well as performances by the Theatre of Eternal Music and Pandit Pran Nath.The festival moved to a dedicated Dream House space in 1979 considered a different site.	
Untitled	Dan Flavin	New York City, New York	1976	1987	For the Whitney Museum of American Art's exhibit 200 years of American Sculpture, Flavin conceived of a long-term fluorescent light installation on a train platform at Grand Central Terminal. The work was beyond the scope of the Whitney exhibition and was instead realized through the support of Dia.	
Dia Cologne	Various Artists	Cologne, Germany	1980	1983	A gallery run by Dia in Cologne, Germany. It presented exhibitions of works by Blinky Palermo, Lucio Fontana, and Imi Knoebel. Donations for Joseph Beuys' 7000 Eichen, presented at documenta 7 in 1982, were coordinated by Dia here.	
Dream House	La Monte Young and Marian Zazeela	New York City, New York	1979	1985	This rendition of Dream House stretched over 6 floors and had more than 20 staff members. Located at the former New York Mercantile Exchange building it closed due to the loss of Dia funding following the 1980s oil glut. Installed in 1979, the installation is not opened to the public until 1981. Dia later helped fund another, smaller, rendition of the work in TriBeCa.	
Masjid al-Farah	Sheikh Muzaffer Ozak, Dan Flavin	New York City, New York	1981	1985	A sufi mosque established by Dia and Sheikh Muzaffer Ozak of the Halveti-Jerrahi Order of Dervishes. In 1982, Dia commissioned, and installed throughout the mosque, a series of untitled light works by Dan Flavin.	
Fred Sandback Museum	Fred Sandback	Winchendon, Massachusetts	1981	1996	A former bank building housing works by Sanback was opened by Dia in 1981 and closed in 1996 by the artist.	
Dia SoHo	Various Artists	New York City, New York	1982	1989	Originally opened in 1982 by Dia as a long-term exhibition space for paintings by Barnett Newman, the gallery has been rented as a retail space since 1989. Located at 77 Wooster Street, there were plans in place to reopen the building as a 2,500-square-foot gallery for changing exhibitions. Those plans have not yet been achieved.	
Chamberlain Gardens	John Chamberlain	Essex, Connecticut	1982	1984	At Chamberlain's former outdoor studio, Dia maintained a ten-acre garden with installations of his work throughout.	
John Chamberlain: Sculpture, An Extended Exhibition	John Chamberlain	New York City, New York	1982	1985	At Chamberlain's former Tribeca studio, Dia presented rotating exhibitions of his work.	
Dan Flavin Art Institute	Dan Flavin	Bridgehampton, New York	1979 building purchased by Dia, 1983 Dan Flavin Art Institute established	Still on view	The Dan Flavin Art Institute, nine works by the artist on permanent display, now constitutes part of Dia Bridgehampton.	
155 Mercer Street	Various artists	New York City, New York	1986	1996	Space used for programing, particularly rehearsal and performance space for modern choreographers.	
Flavin at Chiesa Rossa	Dan Flavin	Milan, Italy	1996	Still on view	Dia worked with the estate of Dan Flavin and Fondazione Prada to install this fluorescent light workin the church Santa Maria Annunciata in Chiesa Rossa. Flavin died the same year as it was installed.	
Beacon Point	George Trakas	Beacon, New York	1999 initiated, 2001 site clean-up 2007 artwork inaugurated	Still on view	Water access area designed as an artwork including an angling deck, boardwalk, and bulkhead created in collaboration with Scenic Hudson and Minetta Brook.	
Dia at the Hispanic Society of America	Various artists	New York City, New York	2007	2011	Dia presented a series of rotating commissions at the Hispanic society including works by Francis Alÿs, Dominique Gonzalez-Foerster, and Koo Jeong A.	
Gramsci Monument	Thomas Hirschhorn	New York City, New York	2013	2013	Installed for just one summer at Forest Houses, a New York City Housing Authority development, numerous pavilions were built including an exhibition space, a library, a stage, an art workshop, computer terminals, and a restaurant all managed by local residents.	
Puerto Rican Light (Cueva Vientos)	Jennifer Allora and Guillermo Calzadilla	Between Guayanilla and Peñuelas, Puerto Rico	2015	2018	The artists placed Puerto Rican Light (to Jeanie Blake), a 1965 fluorescent light sculpture by Dan Flavin, in a cave in the Puerto Rican jungle which can only be accessed by hiking approximately 2 hours to it, and powered it with the use of solar panels.	
Rooftop Urban Park Project	Dan Graham	New York City, New York	1981-1991 elements created, 1991 on view as composed whole	2004	located on the roof of the Dia:Chelsea galleries, Graham placed a small urban park containing a pavilion created out of one-way glass, named Two-Way Mirror Cylinder Inside Cube, and a shed for viewing video art.	
Untitled	Dan Flavin	New York City, New York	1996	Disappears from Dia press releases between February 7, 2017 and February 24, 2017.	Flavin's last artwork using fluorescent light, this site-specific installation was in the two stairwells of Dia's former headquarters at 548 West 22nd Street and is no longer on view.	
Untitled (to you, Heiner, with admiration and affection)	Dan Flavin	Munich, Germany	1973	Disappears from Dia press releases between May 18, 2015 and July 17, 2015.	58 four foot by four foot sculptures made of metal and fluorescent light fixtures.	

== Affiliates ==
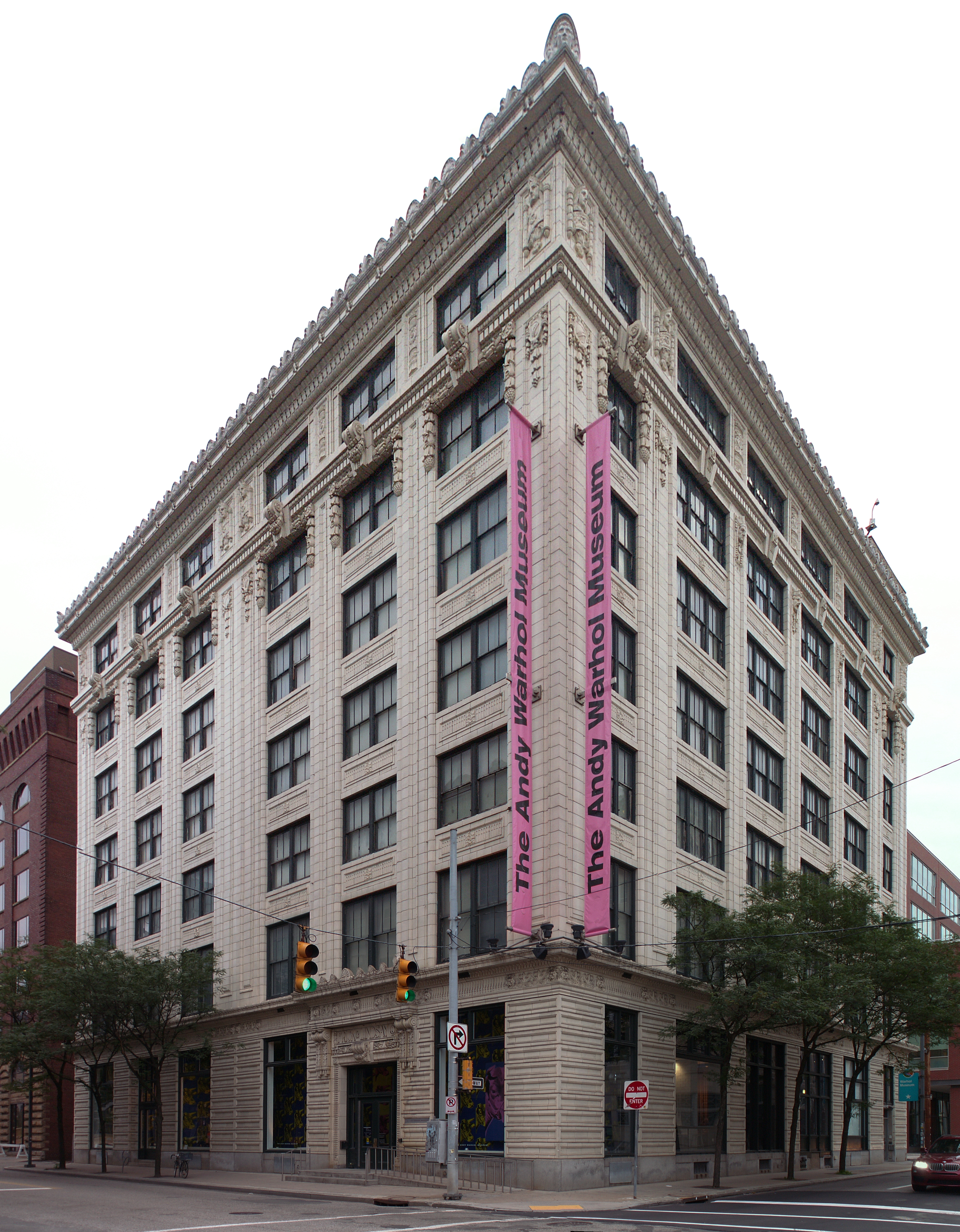
The Andy Warhol Museum in Pittsburgh, Pennsylvania is one of Dia's 7 affiliate institutions.

Alongside the 12 locations and sites Dia manages, they also maintain relationships with 6 affiliate institutions. Dia collaborated and supported these institutions, either financially or by donating or sharing of artworks, early in each organization's development. One of the affiliates, Roden Crater by James Turrell, while being partially funded and supported by Dia since the 70's, is still not completed.

Site	Artist	Placement	Year	Description	Ref.
Andy Warhol Museum	Andy Warhol	Pittsburgh, Pennsylvania	1989 announced, 1994 museum opened	Built in collaboration with the Carnegie Institute and the Andy Warhol Foundation for the Visual Arts as one of the four Carnegie Museums, the museum holds the world's largest collection of art and archival items related to Warhol.	
Chinati Foundation	Various	Marfa, Texas	1978	Began as a collection of works by Donald Judd installed with the help of Dia.	
City	Michael Heizer	Garden Valley, Nevada	1972 begun, 2022 opened	A one and a quarter mile long by one quarter of a mile wide land art piece partially funded by Dia.	
Cy Twombly Gallery	Cy Twombly	Houston, Texas	1994	An installation of Twombly's work built in collaboration with the Menil Collection.	
Dream House	La Monte Young and Marian Zazeela	New York City, New York	1993	A sound and light installation which Dia helped fund the installation of.	
Roden Crater	James Turrell	Painted Desert, Arizona	1977 land acquired not yet completed	A large-scale multi-room installation focused on experiencing light located inside an extinct volcanic Cinder cone funded with support by Dia.	
