= Depreciation (artwork) =

Conceptual land artwork by Cameron Rowland

- The exhibition components of Depreciation at the National Gallery of Art in 2022.
- Artist: Cameron Rowland
- Year: 2018
- Medium: Restrictive covenant; 1 acre on Edisto Island, South Carolina
- Location: Edisto Island, South Carolina
- Owner: Dia Art Foundation (long-term loan)

Depreciation is a work of conceptual land art by American artist Cameron Rowland completed in 2018. The work comprises one acre of land in South Carolina on the site of a former slave plantation which had previously, briefly, been given as reparations to formerly enslaved people, along with legal documents relating to the land. Rowland has set several restrictions on the land, rendering it unusable and undevelopable. The artist has also directed viewers not to visit the land, representing the work in exhibitions with legal documents.

Critics and art historians - and the artist - have suggested that the work represents a critique of property in the United States, showcasing the links between real estate, land use, and the history of slavery in America.

Originally created for an exhibition of Rowland's work at the Museum of Contemporary Art, Los Angeles, Depreciation has since been shown in multiple notable group exhibitions at galleries and museums in the United States and internationally. In 2023 the Dia Art Foundation entered into a long-term loan agreement with Rowland to steward the work as part of Dia's constellation of permanent art installations.

== Background ==
Using funding for their exhibition D37 (2018) at the Museum of Contemporary Art, Los Angeles, Rowland purchased one acre of land on the former Maxcy Place slave plantation on Edisto Island, South Carolina. The property had previously been set aside for and briefly settled by newly freed black families as part of Special Field Orders No. 15, also known as the Forty acres and a mule promise, toward the end of the American Civil War. Following the war, President Andrew Johnson subsequently returned the land to its pre-war owners as the American government withdrew many of its commitments to formerly enslaved people.

After purchasing it in 2018, Rowland imposed a series of permanent covenant restrictions on the land, forbidding in perpetuity any use of, improvement to, or development on the property, rendering it financially worthless, as confirmed by a property appraisal. Covenant restrictions in the United States were historically used by white property owners and communities to enforce segregation by excluding black people from buying homes in their neighborhoods. In the text that accompanies the work, Rowland wrote that "As reparation, this covenant asks how land might exist outside of the legal-economic regime of property that was instituted by slavery and colonization." The artist has deemed that the physical land itself is "not for visitation," and the work is represented in exhibitions with framed copies of the deed to the property, its covenant restrictions, and an appraisal report valuing the land at $0.

== Location ==
The property is located at 8060 Maxie Road on Edisto Island, South Carolina.

== Ownership ==
The land itself is owned by a nonprofit created by Rowland, 8060 Maxie Road, Inc., solely to execute the work. In 2023 the nonprofit entered into a long-term loan agreement with the Dia Art Foundation, making the work one of Dia's constellation of permanent art installations. Unlike the other sites in Dia's collection, the land is still legally owned by Rowland's nonprofit and the work will remain under the nonprofit's ownership in perpetuity. Dia describes its role as "stewarding" the artwork, and the legal documents have been on long-term display at Dia Chelsea since 2023.

Critics and journalists have labeled Dia's stewardship of the work an example of the institution's changing priorities and evolving relationship to the medium of land art, for which Dia is well known as a prominent collector and supporter of the medium. Rowland's work engages with issues of race and slavery, unlike the majority of the institution's permanent artworks, and Depreciation is markedly different from well-known land artworks owned by Dia like Spiral Jetty or The Broken Kilometer, in that this work is expressly not for visitation while the previous works have become pilgrimage sites for some in the art world.

== Reception and analysis ==
Zoé Samudzi wrote in Art in America that Rowland "sought to strip a land asset of its value to prevent further profiteering," further noting that the covenant at the heart of the work "effectively deprives the land of the value derived from forced labor by excising it from the antagonistic real estate market enforcing this anti-Black property relation." Writing in Artforum, critic Marina Vishmidt said that the work was an example of Rowland's "primary media" being "not physical objects but the legal mechanisms that often serve as titles for the work." Vishmidt wrote that Depreciation "added friction to how a piece of land, a fictitious commodity, was able to circulate."

Curator and writer Simon Wu, writing in Momus, said that Depreciation was an extension of "Rowland's critique of property relations [...] to the critique of literal property, i.e., land as capital." Wu suggested that "For Rowland, rerouting the flow of capital is not as important as rethinking our property relations wholesale, even if it means rendering an entire plot of land unusable." Writer and curator Alex Jen labeled the work a "critique of this country's tying upward mobility with white land ownership." Writing in The Brooklyn Rail, Jen argued that "By wresting the power of land valuation HOLC once used and instead using it constructively to wryly co-opt the restrictive covenants that white property owners used to keep blacks from owning their land, Rowland dismantles the idea that property can be a means of reparation."

Curator and art historian Irene Sunwoo, writing in The Avery Review, explained that "While racially restrictive covenants helped to increase property value in white neighborhoods, they conversely facilitated the redlining of areas populated by lower-income minorities," and suggested that "Rowland’s appropriation of the restrictive covenant responds directly to this long history of housing discrimination." Writing in Third Text, the critic Guy Mannes-Abbott referenced a passage by Rowland that said, "the restriction imposed on 8060 Maxie Road’s status as valuable and transactable real estate asserts antagonism to the regime of property as a means of reparation;" Mannes-Abbott wrote that "The regime really refers to the practice of capital abstraction, especially in the form of mortgaging, which used slaves as collateral because they were deemed property across the range referred to above."
