= Dia Bridgehampton =

Dan Flavin art museum in Bridgehampton, New York

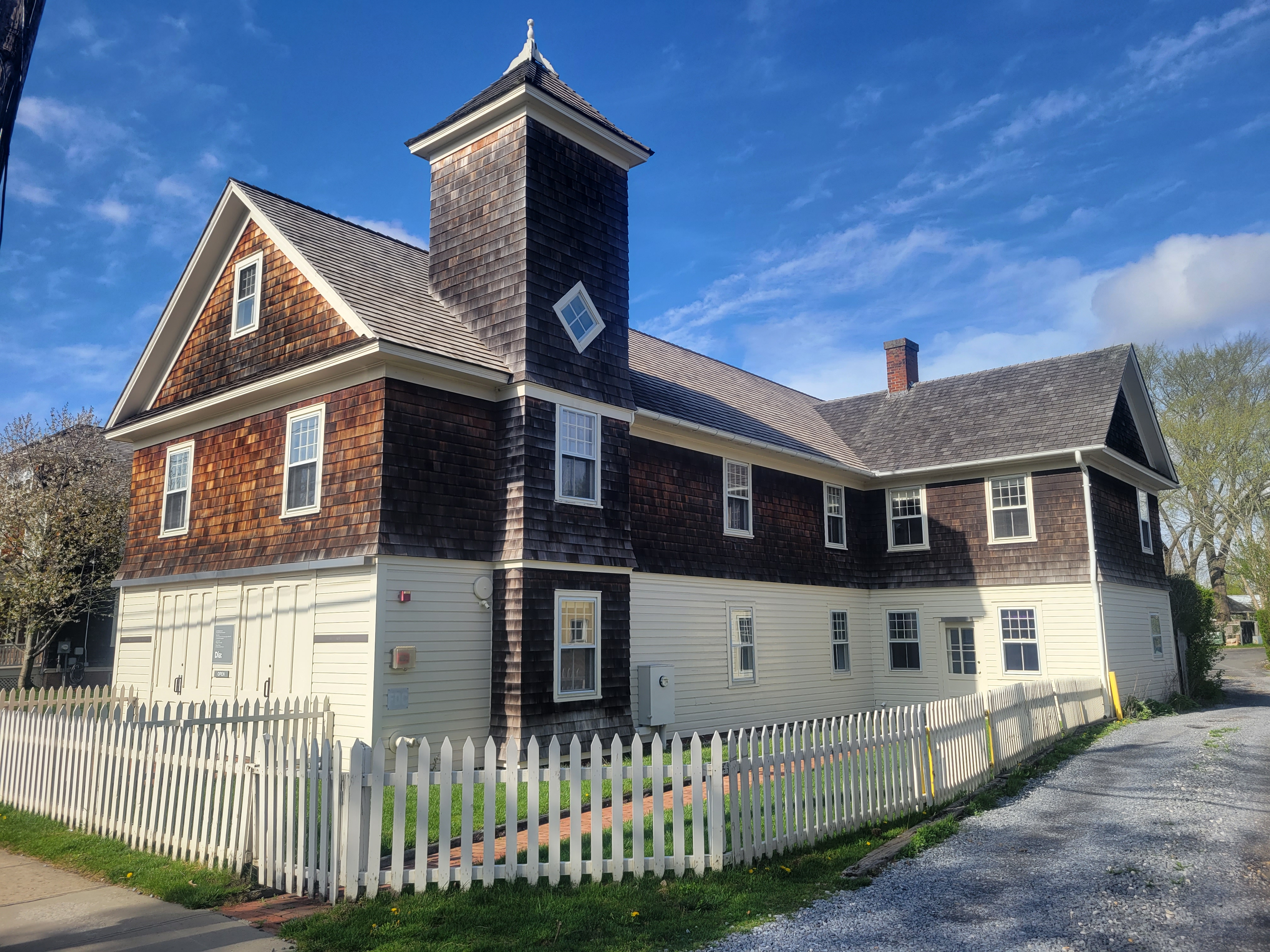
- Former name: Dan Flavin Art Institute
- Established: 1983
- Location: 23 Corwith Avenue Bridgehampton, New York, US
- Coordinates: 40.936673°N 72.304942°W
- Type: Art museum
- Key holdings: nine works on permanent display by Dan Flavin
- Collections: Modern and contemporary art
- Founders: Dan Flavin and Dia Art Foundation
- Owner: Dia Art Foundation
- Public transit access: Bridgehampton station, Montauk Branch of the Long Island Rail Road
- Website: Official website

Dia Bridgehampton is a museum in Bridgehampton, New York run by the Dia Art Foundation. Opened in 1983 as the Dan Flavin Art Institute, the building was renovated by Dia, under the direction of minimalist sculptor Dan Flavin, as a permanent display of his fluorescent light works in a single-artist museum. The museum also houses a gallery for temporary exhibitions, and a display of historic objects related to the building from before it became a museum.

The museum building was originally built in 1909 as a firehouse, and then used as a church from 1924 to 1979. This history is part of the reason Dan Flavin chose the building to house his work, and is referenced in some exhibits.

In early 2020, Dia renamed the "Dan Flavin Art Institute" to "Dia Bridgehampton". The Flavin works within the museum are now considered the "Dan Flavin Art Institute" while the rotating gallery makes up the rest of "Dia Bridgehampton". This museum is one of the twelve locations and sites the Dia Art Foundation manages.

== History ==
=== Dia ===
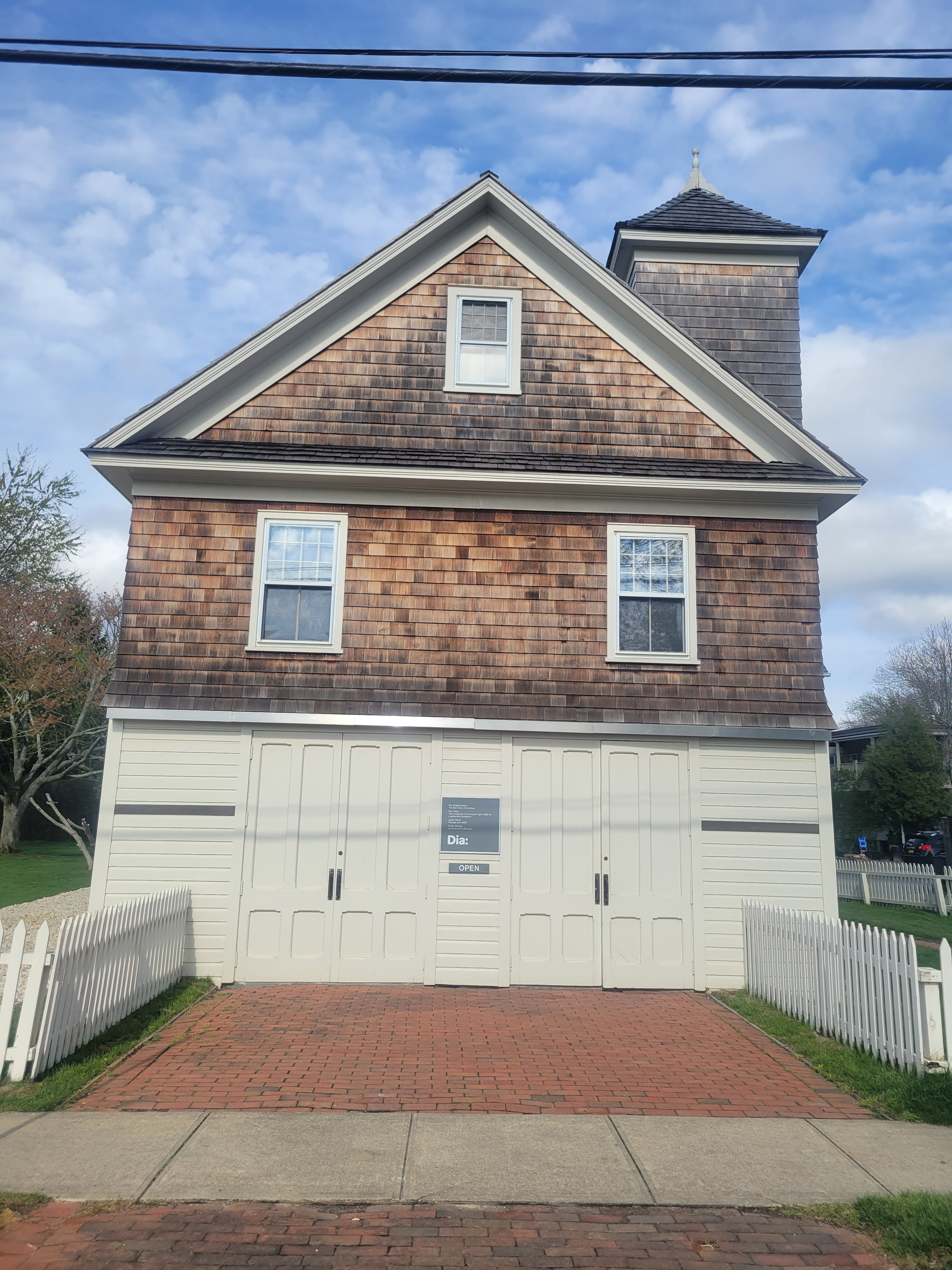
Front façade

In 1974, the Dia Art Foundation was established by Heiner Friedrich, Schlumberger heiress Philippa de Menil, and Helen Winkler to help artists realize ambitious projects whose scale and scope is not feasible within the normal museum and gallery systems. In 1979 the Dia Art Foundation purchased a former firehouse and church in Bridgehampton, New York to house a long-term exhibition of Dan Flavin's work as well as a rotating exhibition space. Dan Flavin was a minimalist sculptor, working primarily in fluorescent light, and was one of several artist Dia patronized through the 70's and 80's with stipends, studios, archivists, and single artist museums. Flavin was a resident of Wainscot at the time, but had previously lived in Bridgehampton for several years. He chose the turreted, shingle-style building for its accessible location and open floor space.

=== Construction ===
While some repairs were made to the roof after purchasing, major renovations began in September 1982 with the architect Richard Gluckman designing the museum, under Flavin's direction. Gluckman had connections to both Flavin and Dia, having previously worked with Flavin on a 1977 installation for the Dia founders as well as designing the Dia Center for the Arts on West 22nd Street, now Dia Chelsea.

The renovation of the former firehouse and church included repairs to the exterior, new landscaping, and extensive remodeling of the interior. Interior work included the addition of a fire sprinkler system and a large scale rewiring of the building to accommodate the power draws associated with Flavin's fluorescent light sculptures. Ultraviolet-filtered glass windows were installed with grey mylar shades to help control the lighting inside. The newel post, or main post at the foot of the staircase, was painted fire-engine-red as a reference to the building's use as a fire station. A small gallery on the second floor was created to hold memorabilia from the renovation process including the church doors and a neon cross. Gutters and external electrical cables were removed. Exterior doors, paneling, and shingles were restored and a blue light was installed under the lower cornice. "We've tried to put the firehouse façade back on it," said Flavin, referencing a new set of double doors which duplicated the look of the original firehouse doors that allowed the engines in and out.

=== Opening ===
The museum opened on June 18, 1983 as the Dan Flavin Art Institute. Flavin dedicated and named the building after James Schaeufele, the site supervisor of the renovation project, as he often titled his work after people close to him. In its original configuration, the museum was created to house a permanent display of Flavin's work in the building's vestibule and second floor. An artist's archive, a printmaking workshop area, and a rotating exhibition space were planned for the first floor and an upstairs apartment. An adjacent residential property was repurposed to hold the administrative center of the institution.

An exhibit of fire department memorabilia, much like the display of church objects already installed, was planned to be assembled and installed in the bell tower after the opening of the museum. An apartment on the second floor was also planned for visiting printmakers and an intaglio press was planned to be installed in the former kitchen space.

=== Reorganization ===
Without any physical changes to the structure occurring, Dia switched from calling the museum the "Dan Flavin Art Institute" to calling it "Dia Bridgehampton" between a November 21, 2019 and a January 29, 2020 press release. The term "Dan Flavin Art Institute" is now used solely for the Flavin works on display. "Dia Bridgehampton" includes the Flavin exhibit and the rotating gallery. One exhibit per year is displayed in this rotating gallery, with a focus on artists living or working on Long Island.

== Dan Flavin Art Institute ==
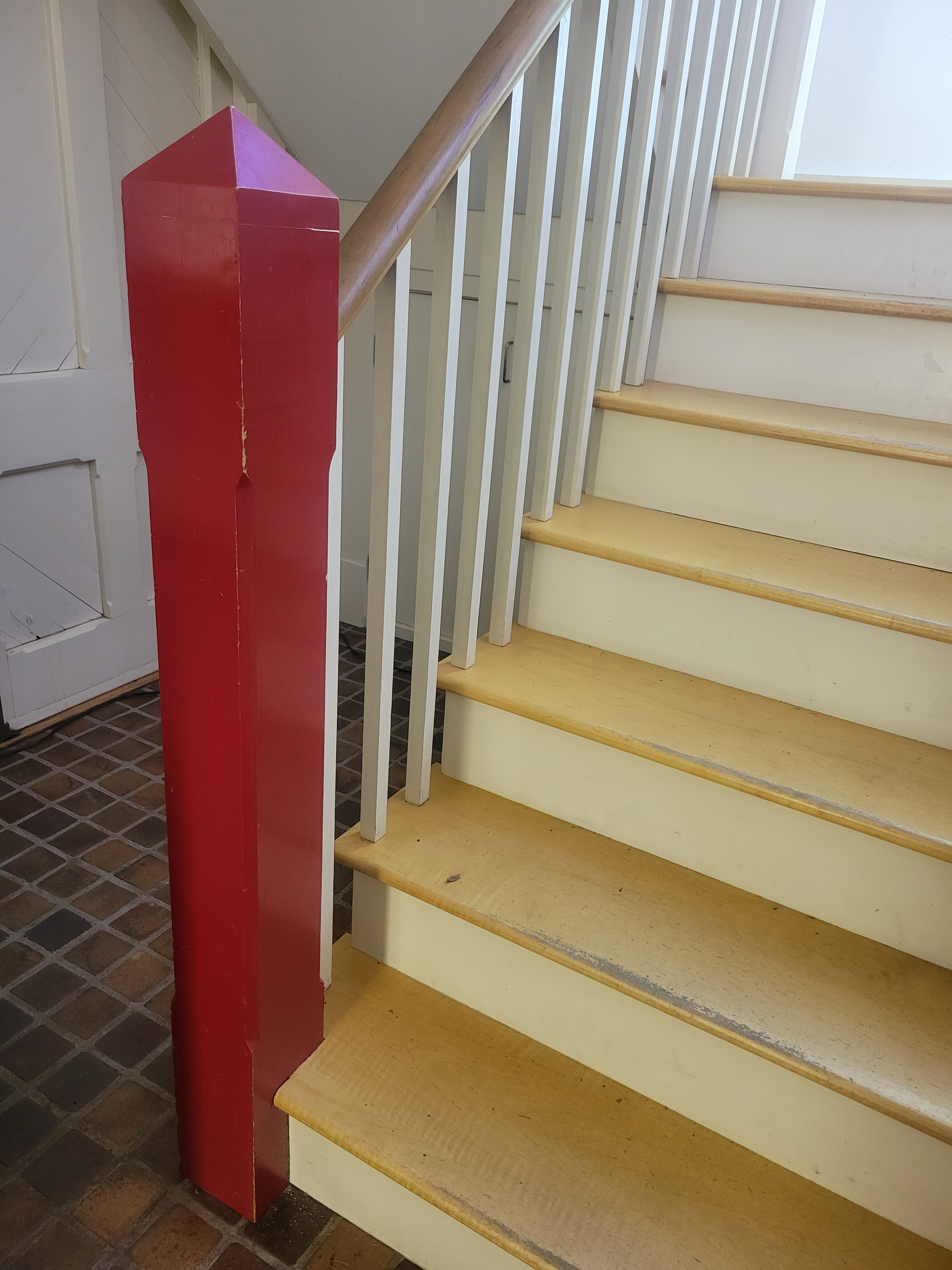
The red newel post on the first floor of Dia Bridgehampton, the same floor that houses the temporary exhibition gallery.

The Dan Flavin Art Institute is a permanent display of Dan Flavin's work within Dia Bridgehampton. This display consists of nine fluorescent light works and one drawing. The institute is a mini-retrospective touching on each of the major type of work he created with the medium. Dia expresses that the lights and the architecture should be viewed as a "single, continuous installation," and that "Flavin provided an experience built of provocative contrasts—between colors, intensities of light, structure and formlessness, the obvious and the curious, the serious and the humorous."

The following table lists the works on permanent display.

Title	Date	Material	Edition	Owner
red out of a corner (to Annina)	1963	Fluorescent light and metal fixtures	2/3	The Estate of Dan Flavin
untitled	1976	Fluorescent light and metal fixtures	2/3	Dia Art Foundation
untitled (to Robert, Joe, and Michael)	1975-81	Fluorescent light and metal fixtures	2/3	Dia Art Foundation
untitled (to Jan and Ron Greenberg)	1972-73	Fluorescent light and metal fixtures	2/3	Dia Art Foundation
untitled (in honor of Harold Joachim) 3	1977	Fluorescent light and metal fixtures	1/3	Dia Art Foundation
untitled (to Katharina and Christoph), (from the European Couples series)	1966-71	Fluorescent light and metal fixtures	1/5	Dia Art Foundation
untitled (to Jim Schaeufele) 1	1972	Fluorescent light and metal fixtures	1/3	Dia Art Foundation
untitled (to Jim Schaeufele) 2	1972	Fluorescent light and metal fixtures	1/3	Dia Art Foundation
untitled (to Jim Schaeufele) 3	1972	Fluorescent light and metal fixtures	1/3	Dia Art Foundation
untitled drawing for icon IV (the pure land) (to David John Flavin [1933–1962])	1962	Pencil and chalk on paper	—N/a	Collection of Stephen Flavin

== The building ==
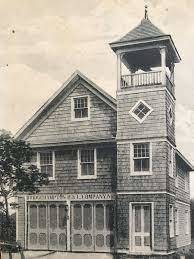
The Bridgehampton Hook and Ladder Company before it was sold to the First Baptist Church of Bridgehampton in 1924. In the 1947 renovation the façade was extended and an annex was constructed.

The building Dia Bridgehampton occupies was constructed in 1909 and was previously used as a firehouse and a church. Flavin included this history though many of the renovations done to create the museum.

=== Bridgehampton Hook and Ladder Company ===
Bridgehampton, New York, organized a volunteer firefighting service in 1895. The newly formed Bridgehampton Hook and Ladder Company of firefighters had its first meeting on May 15, 1895, with 15 members attending. Early meetings were held in Atlantic Hall on Ocean Avenue. The company purchased its first engine in 1899 and stored it in the barn belonging to the company foreman, Ed Roger. The engine was subsequently moved to the Academy on Ocean Road and, in 1900, to a building on the property of J. A. Sanford, one of the company's trustees. In 1905 a building lot on Corwith Avenue, then known as Kansas Avenue, was purchased for $270 (equivalent to $9,675 in 2025) intending to build a headquarters for the company. The building was completed and dedicated in 1909 at a cost of $1593 (equivalent to $57,082 in 2025). The two-story, plus attic, building held fire fighting equipment on the first floor and a meeting room, or "Fireman's Hall" on the second. An old bell was purchased from the Academy for $5 and installed in the building's bell tower.

In 1921, Bridgehampton considered building a new Community House which would include a new firehouse. A motion was approved that stated if quarters were made for the fire department they would move in to the new building and sell the firehouse on Corwith Avenue, with the proceeds going towards the construction of the Community House. The Community House was completed in 1923 and the Fire Company moved to the new quarters there. The Bridgehampton Hook and Ladder Company was dissolved on May 28, 1923, and a new fire district was approved by the Town Board of Supervisors. The new firefighting organization was named the Bridgehampton Fire Department.

=== First Baptist Church of Bridgehampton ===
In 1924 the First Baptist Church of Bridgehampton, under the leadership of H.D. Strotter, purchased the building and began using it as a church. In February 1947 a vote was taken by the congregation about whether to build a new church. The vote passed, but the reverend decided to renovate the building instead. This 1947 renovation included a new cornerstone laid by the Prince Hall Freemasonry, also known as the African American Freemasonry. The main entrance was moved to the side of the building and the façade was extended. An annex was also constructed for a first-floor garage with an apartment over it. The building remained in use as a church through the mid-1970s. At this point the First Baptist Church congregation grew too large and a new church was erected nearby.

== Historic display ==
Items in the historic display

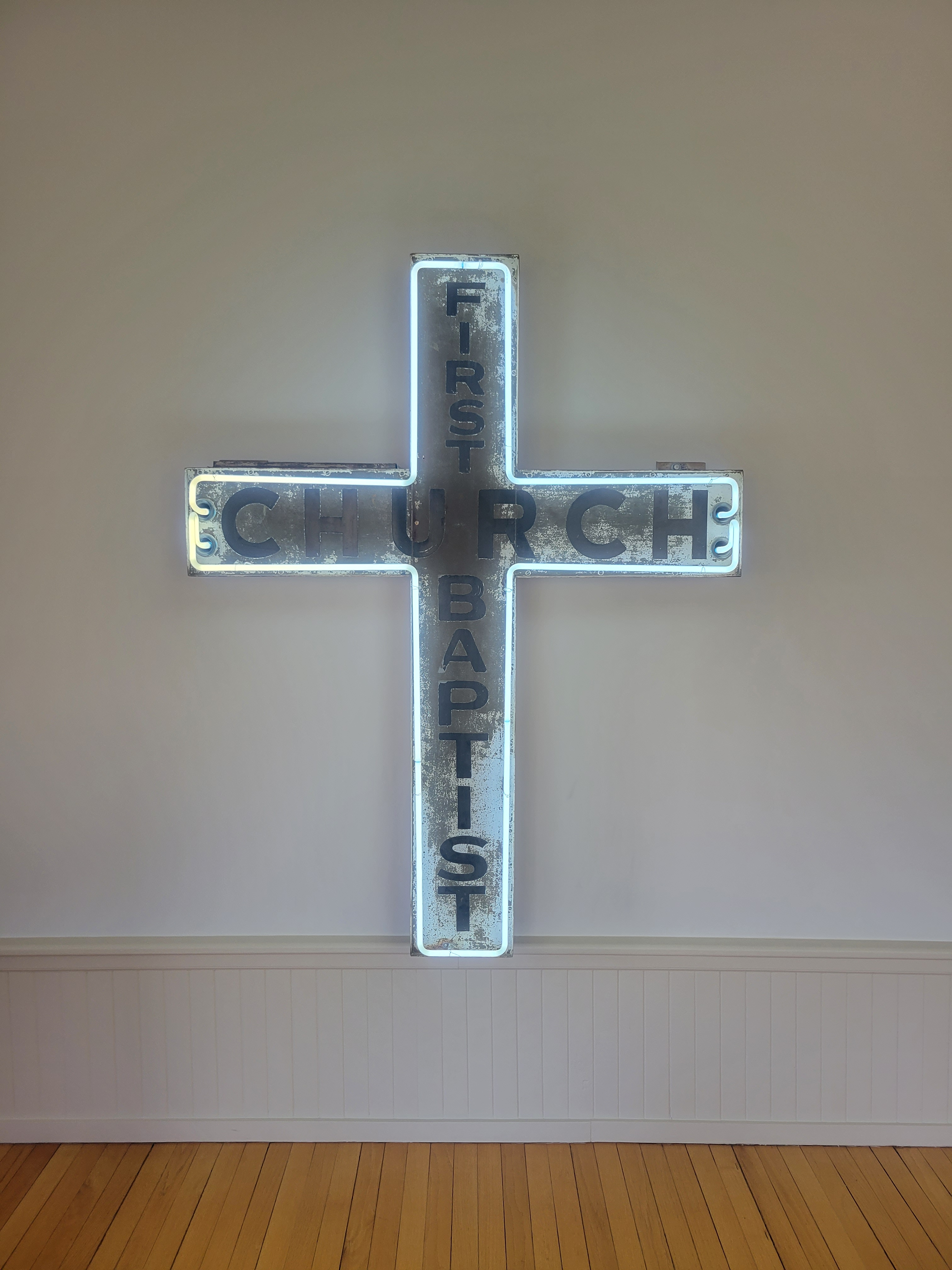
Neon Cross from the First Baptist Church

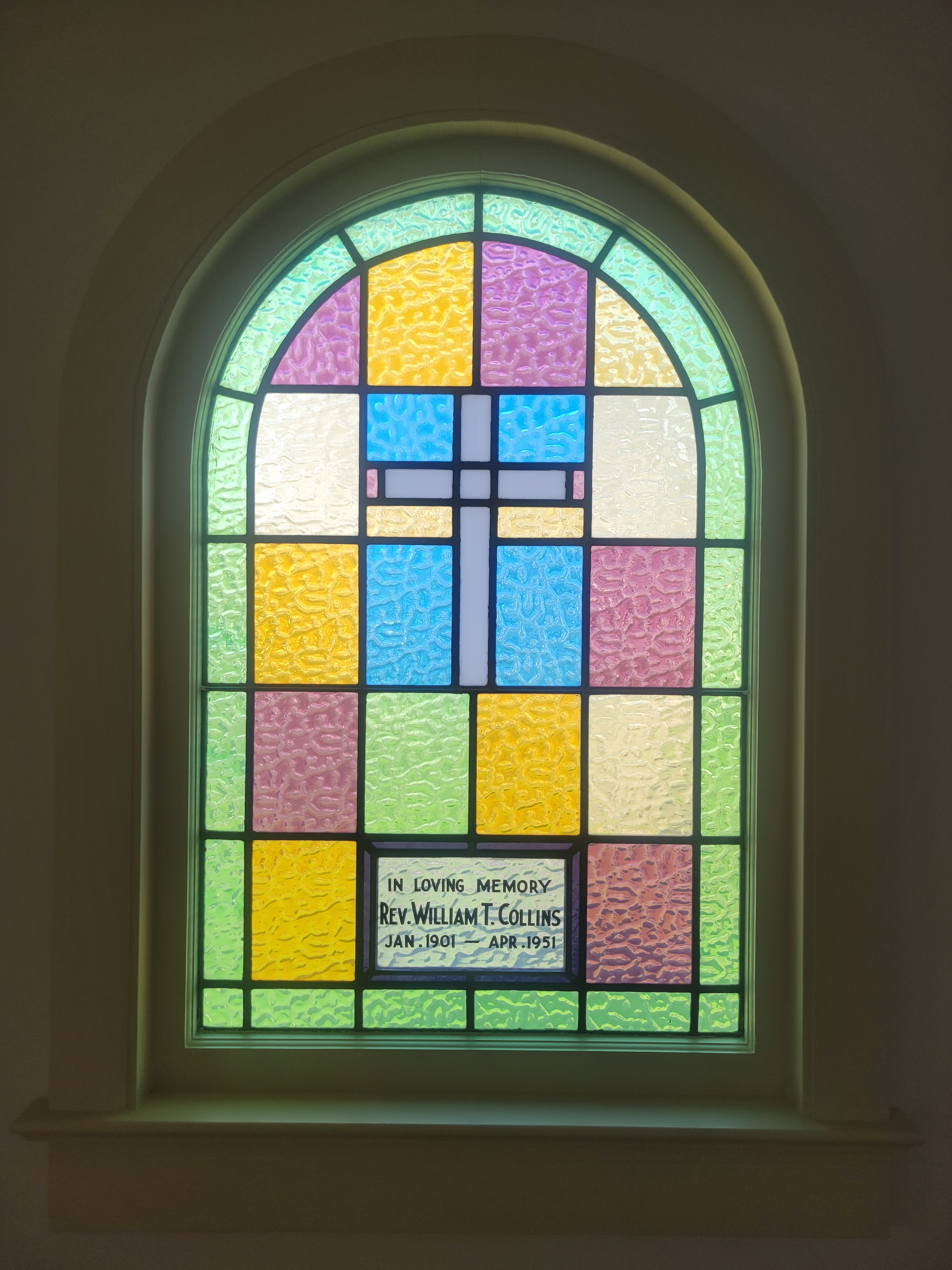
Window from the First Baptist Church

The back room on the second floor contains a display of historic memorabilia from the First Baptist Church. This display includes the church doors and a frosted glass window. This room also includes a large neon cross from the church as well as the 1947 church cornerstone which was removed and preserved here. This cornerstone was laid by a chapter of Prince Hall Freemasonry, also known as the African American Freemasonry.

Dia comments in a pamphlet that this space, and its neon cross, "alludes to Flavin's transformation of light and fluorescent fixtures from spiritual associations or mundane service to contemporary “icons” depleted of religious or utilitarian significance."

== Temporary exhibitions ==
The first floor of Dia Bridgehampton houses a gallery where temporary exhibitions are presented. This gallery was originally envisioned by Flavin as a venue for changing exhibitions as well as a print shop. When the museum opened, the plans for the gallery were to present prints created on the premises, historical exhibits of late 19th to early 20th century etchings, drawings, and watercolors, as well as contemporary works by artists such as James Turrell and Donald Judd. When the Dan Flavin Art Institute opened the first exhibit in this gallery was a presentation of Flavin's the diagonal of May 25th, 1963 (to Constantin Brancusi), his first work using fluorescent light fixtures, and preparatory drawings. The gallery has gone through many different curatorial shifts since this first exhibit.

=== Exhibitions under Flavin ===
The opening set of exhibitions was organized directly by Flavin, with the first being a selection of paintings by Michael Venezia. These early exhibitions focused on contemporary artists, historic artists and crafts persons, as well as Flavin's own work. This set of exhibitions included drawings by James Brooks, locally made arts and crafts style art, furniture, and pottery in 1984, and the presentation of Flavin's Untitled (To My Dear Bitch, Airily) 2 in 1985. This series of exhibits culminated in 1987 with an Andy Warhol memorial show, displayed five months after his death, featuring paintings by Warhol, photographs by Stephen Shore, and Native American blankets from Warhol's collection.

In 1987 Dia reassessed the direction the first floor gallery should take and hired Henry Geldzahler, the former curator of 20th-century art at the Metropolitan Museum of Art, to create a new series. He broke each season into three exhibits, two solo shows, and one larger group show of works by artists living in the East End of Long Island. This new format brought exhibitions by artists Cy Twombly in 1988, Louise Bourgeois in 1989, Enrique Castro-Cid in 1990, Alice Neel in 1991, John Chamberlain and another exhibition of Andy Warhol work, focusing on his oxidation paintings, in 1992, and Manuel Neri in 1993.

=== Exhibitions after Flavin's death ===
In 1995 a new series was initiated with the exhibit Dan Flavin's Collection of Japanese Drawings and Prints, a display of objects drawn directly from Flavin's art collection and organized by him. This series was supposed to be organized by Flavin, but he died in 1996 leaving the series unrealized. For several years after his death the gallery was used to display his work including his drawings in 1997 and 1998, and a selection of his early wall sculptures from 1999 to 2003.

Dia returned to presenting artists other than Flavin with an exhibit of prints by Fred Sandback from 2004 to 2006, an exhibit of foam and paper sculptures by John Chamberlin's in 2007, and two exhibits of large scale collage by Imi Knoebel in 2008 and 2009–2010. Also exhibited in 2010 was a short exhibition of Hudson River School drawings alongside Flavin's own drawings of the Hudson Valley.

For the next four years the gallery was largely used to present exhibitions that related to, or were extensions of, larger exhibits at Dia Beacon or elsewhere. These exhibitions included a series of works on paper as part of Koo Jeong A's Constellation Congress from 2010 to 2011, new work by Jean-Luc Moulène which accompanied Opus + One at Dia Beacon in 2011–12, and A Friendship: Carl Andre's Works on Paper from the LeWitt Collection presented in conjunction with a retrospective of his work at Dia Beacon. Another exhibition of works by John Chamberlin was also presented in 2013–14. This was, once again, followed by a several-year-long exhibit of Flavin's early wall sculptures from 2015 to 2017.

=== Focus on Long Island artists ===
Since 2017, the exhibitions in the first-floor gallery are primarily works by a single artist who resides or works on Long Island. For these exhibitions, Dia invites artists to use react to the properties of the space they are exhibiting in. Artists have used this prompt to make work that responds to the Flavin sculptures in the gallery upstairs, the history of the building, the land and the surrounding region, or the tangible and intangible qualities of the space. Artists presenting include Mary Heilmann (2017-2018), Keith Sonnier (2018-2019), Jacqueline Humphries (2019-2020), and Jill Magid (2020-2021).

Recently, the exhibitions, while based largely in the first floor gallery, have included elements outside of the building. Maren Hassinger included a new galvanized steel rope sculpture installed in Dia Bridgehampton's back lawn for her 2021-2022 exhibit, Leslie Hewitt installed a bronze silhouette on a boulder also in the backyard in 2022–2023, and Tony Cokes purchased advertisements on nearby electronic billboards in 2023–2024.

== Reception ==
Helen A. Harrison, an art critic for The New York Times, wrote in an article at the time of the Dan Flavin Art Institute opening that there was general praise for the building renovation and the sculptures. When speaking of the sculptures she wrote, "many observers considered [them] beautiful and effectively installed." The only negative she notes is the way tours of the works were organized at the time.

In 2012, Greg Lindquist reviewed the Dan Flavin Art Institute for The Brooklyn Rail. He compared the sculptures to more contemporary and personal washes of light including, "the electric pinkish haze that accumulates over Times Square in the night," light sabers from Star Wars, CMYK gradients, the quality of light under water, various times of day, and, "imaginings of a cold war nuclear disaster during my childhood" such as from the movie The Day After.

Lee F. Mindel wrote in Architectural Digest in 2016 about how the intimate scale and scope of the Dan Flavin Art Institute contrasts the trend of building larger scale museums at the time. He also wrote, "After viewing Flavin's pieces, I was struck by how much more detail I noticed about the play of natural light all around me."

== See also ==
- List of works by Dan Flavin
