= Mercer Street (Manhattan) =

Street in Manhattan, New York

Coordinates: 40°43′32″N 73°59′52″W

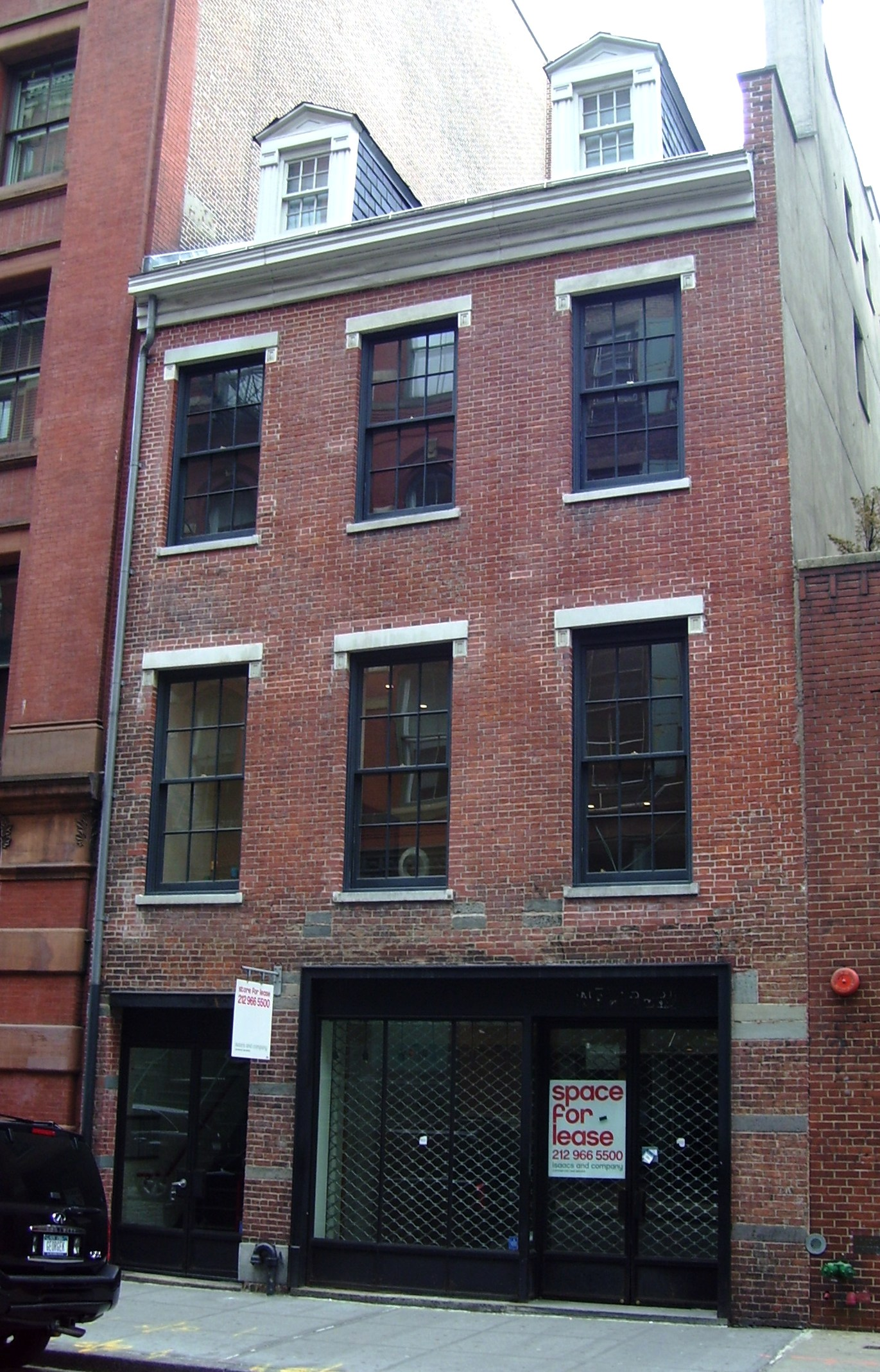
149 Mercer Street, between Houston and Prince Streets

Mercer Street is a street in the New York City borough of Manhattan. It runs north to south through Greenwich Village and SoHo neighborhoods, from East 8th Street past West Houston Street to Canal Street. The street was previously called First Street and Clermont Street, but was renamed in 1799 for Hugh Mercer, a Scottish-American brigadier general who died at the Battle of Princeton, which came about due to his advice to George Washington to march on Princeton.

== In popular culture ==
- Mercer Street is mentioned in the 1997 song "Anybody Seen My Baby?" from the Rolling Stones
- The naming of Mercer Street was referenced in the 2015 Broadway musical Hamilton, in the song "The Room Where It Happens", during an exchange between Alexander Hamilton and Aaron Burr.
- Mark Ronson used to have a studio there. That’s where he and Amy Winehouse first met, before working on the album "Back to Black" around 2006. "Back to Black" was released on 27 October 2006 in the UK.

== See also ==
- 25-27 Mercer Street
- 155 Mercer Street
