= Times Square (Neuhaus) =

Art installation in Times Square

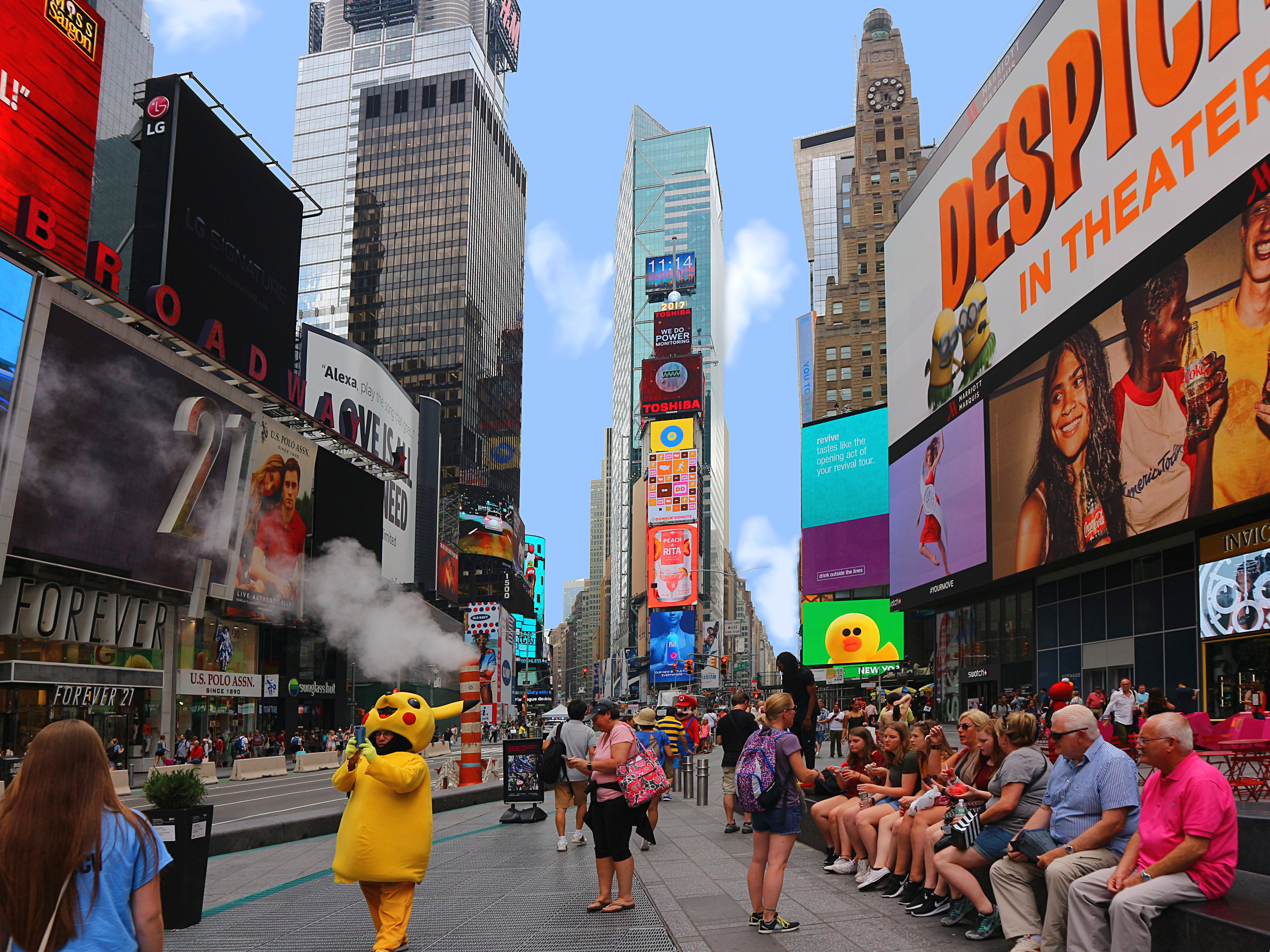
- The location in Times Square where the sound art installation emanates
- Artist: Max Neuhaus
- Year: 1977, 1992 removed, 2002 reinstalled
- Medium: Sound art
- Location: Dia Art Foundation, New York City, New York
- 40.7585°N 73.9853°W
- Owner: Dia Art Foundation
- Accession: 2003.179
- Website: www.diaart.org/visit/visit-our-locations-sites/max-neuhaus-times-square

Times Square, often referred to as the hum or the Times Square Hum, is a permanent sound art installation created by Max Neuhaus in Times Square in New York City. Originally installed in 1977, it was removed in 1992 and reinstalled in 2002. It is maintained by the Dia Art Foundation, who consider it one of the twelve locations and sites they manage.

== History ==
Max Neuhaus was a contemporary music maker and artist credited with being the first person to use sound as their primary medium in contemporary art. Times Square was one of a grouping of sound art pieces he created throughout the 1970s in public places in New York City. Other works from the same time period include Walkthrough, in what is now Jay Street–MetroTech station, and A New Work (Underground) in the Museum of Modern Art's garden. The work to create Times Square specifically began when Neuhaus entered negotiations with the Metropolitan Transportation Authority (MTA) and Consolidated Edison (ConEd) in 1973 about installing the piece. These negotiations stretched over four years largely due to the MTA's refusal to collaborate with a private individual. Neuhaus had to form a non-profit, which he named "Hybrid Energies for Acoustic Resources" (HEAR), before the state agency would begin discussions.

Once the negotiations were completed, Neuhaus constructed homemade electronic sound generators to be used specifically for this piece. He opened the street grate on a pedestrian island between Broadway and Seventh Avenue, between 45th and 46th Streets, and climbed down into a steam escape vent shaft that is visible through the grate. Here he installed both the generator and a loudspeaker. From the beginning, powering the work proved troublesome as the voltage internal to the subway system was too high to power the piece, and ConEd refused to join a line to MTA property. To rectify this, Neuhaus hired an independent maintenance company to connect the piece to a nearby street lamp through an improvised connection.

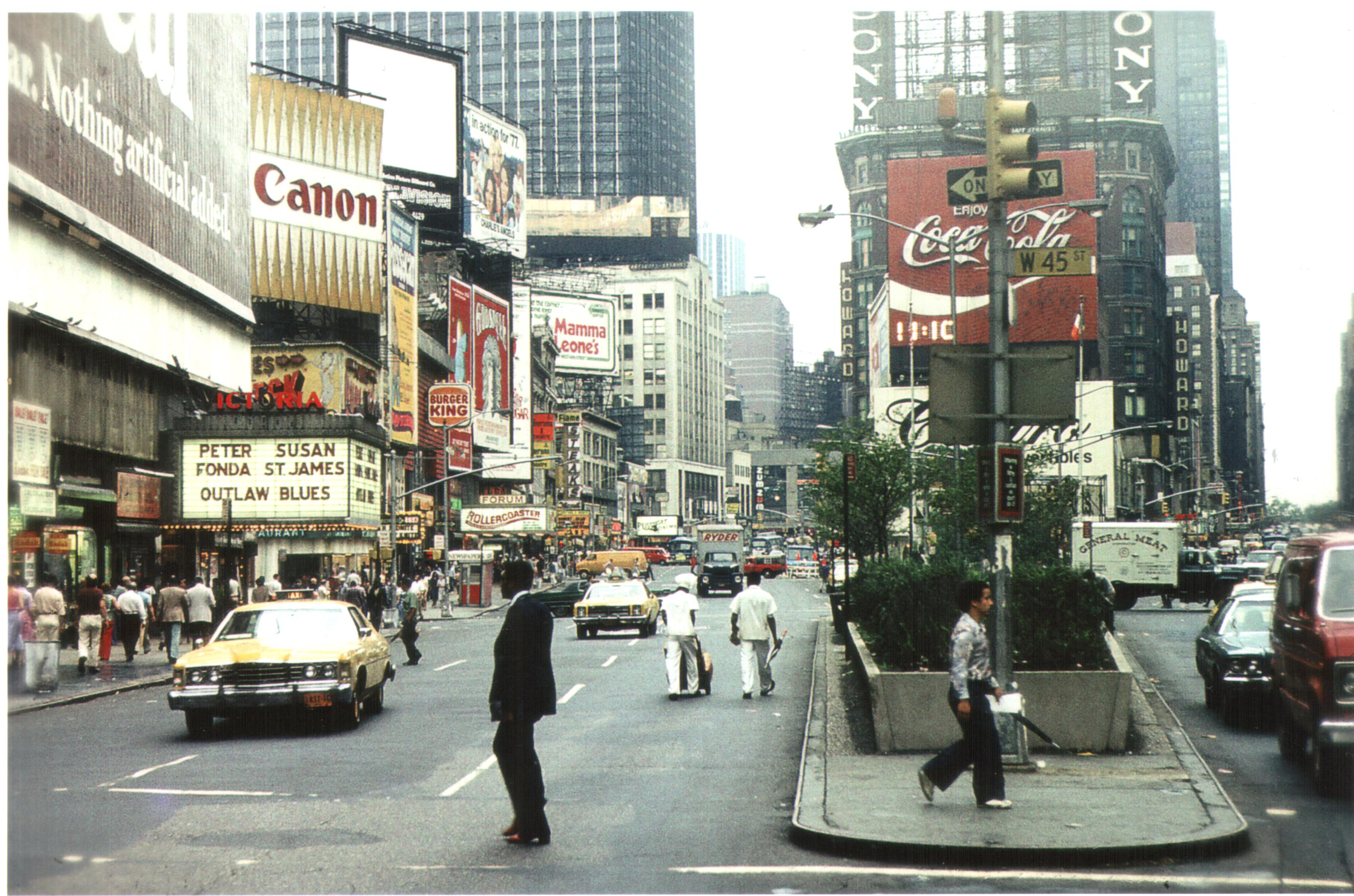
An image of Times Square in 1977, the year Times Square was first installed

From 1977 through the early 1990s, Times Square continued to play, but supplying power was an ongoing problem. Neuhaus began getting more commissions in Europe and moved abroad, so keeping up with the maintenance on the piece became impossible. For this reason, the piece was disconnected in 1992, but Neuhaus's reputation continued to grow. In 2002, Christine Burgin, a New York City gallery owner, conceived of bringing Times Square back. By working with Neuhaus, the MTA, the Times Square Business Improvement District, and the Dia Art Foundation, Burgin managed to relaunch the piece. The main difference in the new incarnations of the work is a higher volume to overcome the increase in noise in Times Square. Subsequently Neuhaus donated Times Square to the Dia Art Foundation, who currently maintain the piece.

Between the 2002 relaunch and Neuhaus's death in 2009, Neuhaus built additional fail-safe measures into the work so that it would not turn off accidentally. He also watched the area over webcam and worked to discourage street performers as he was worried their sounds would interfere with Times Square.

For about a year between 2015 and 2016, due to the multi-year pedestrianization of Times Square construction, Times Square was inaccessible but, according to the director of communications at the Dia Art Foundation, was never turned off. During this construction granite seating was added next to the grate Times Square emanates from. Also in 2016 New York introduced "Designated Activity Zones" throughout Times Square where street musicians and costumed characters are allowed to perform for tips. One of these zones was marked out with teal paint next to the Times Square grate as well.

Times Square remains the only public installation of a work by Neuhaus in the United States, and is active and can be heard 24 hours a day, seven days a week.

== Design ==
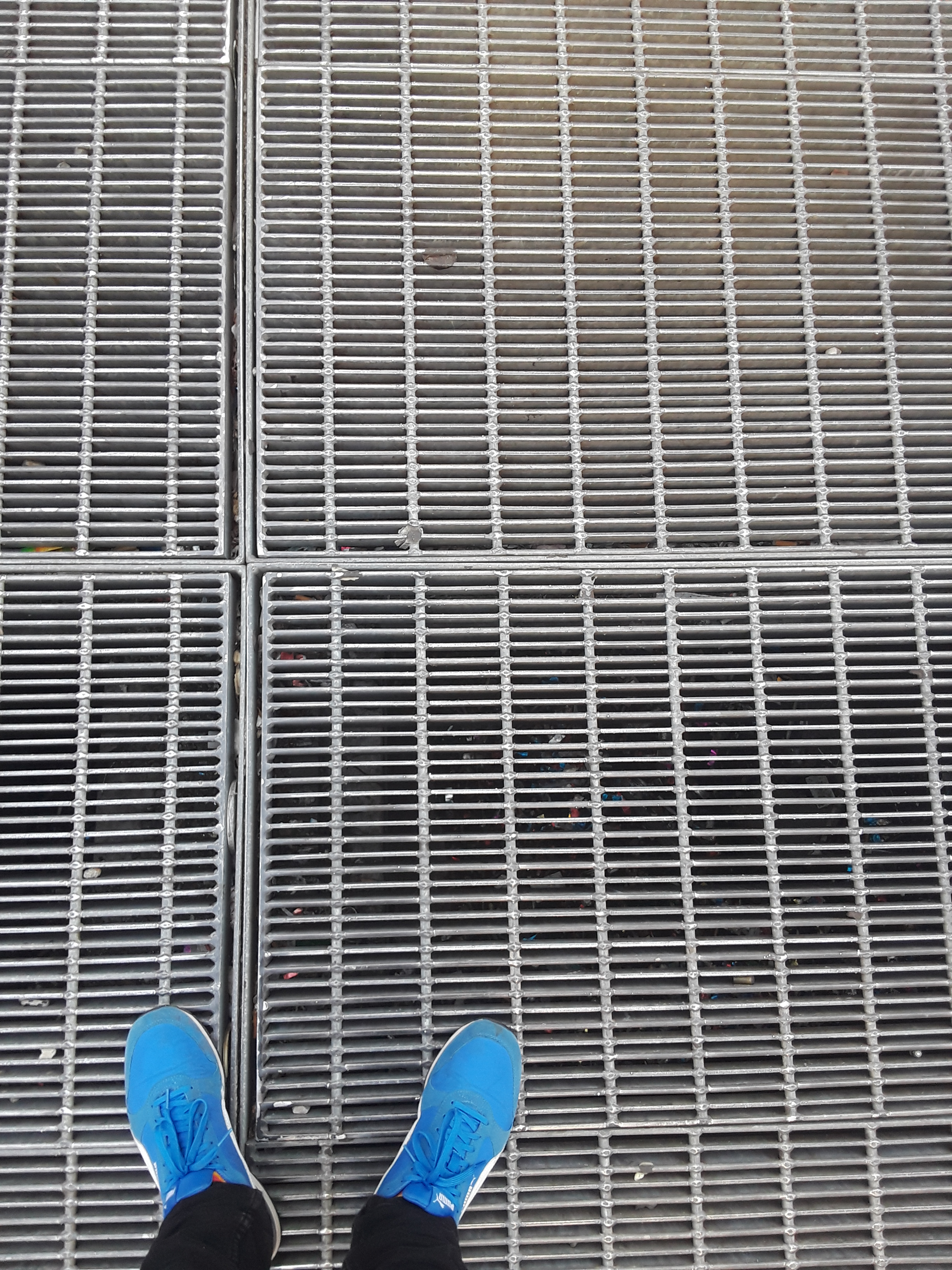
The subway grate where "Times Square" emanates.

Times Square is located in Times Square, on the north side of what was once a triangular pedestrian island, but is now a pedestrian plaza, created by the intersection of Broadway and Seventh Avenue, between 45th and 46th Streets. There is no signage or marking to denote the piece as a work of art per Neuhaus's request. The sound simply emanates from a grate over a steam vent. Neuhaus stated it is intended for the sound to be "plausible", dismissed as an "unusual machinery sound from below ground" and to be overlooked repeatedly until it is discovered by the viewer in a serendipitous way.

The sound itself is described by Neuhaus as "resembling the after ring of large bells," but has also been described as a "deep and slightly pulsating drone" by Dia, "a rich harmonic sound texture" by the MTA, and "a deeply resonant and mildly undulating drone, its tone suggestive of low-pitched chimes or church bells," by The New York Times. While it is a singular wavelength, Dia notes that the perceived sound changes in "pitch, timbre, and tone relative to human movement.

The surrounding area has changed drastically since the work was first installed in 1977. Neuhaus described the area in 1977 saying, "The aural and visual environment is rich and complex. It includes large billboards, moving neon signs, office buildings, hotels, theaters, porno centers and electronic game emporiums. Its population is equally diverse, including tourists, theatregoers, commuters, pimps, shoppers, hucksters and office workers." As of 2020 the area is largely a tourist area populated with "desnudas" and costumed characters performing for tips.
