= Max Neuhaus =

American musician (1939–2009)

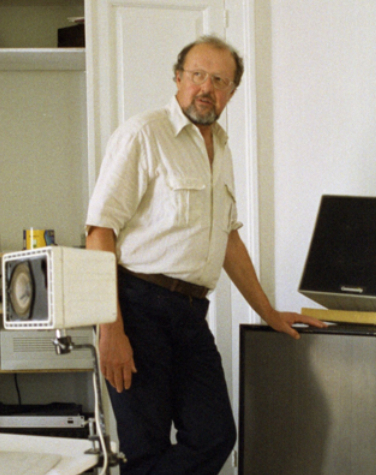

Background information
- Born: August 9, 1939
- Died: February 3, 2009 (aged 69)
- Genres: Avant-garde, experimental
- Occupations: Public art, sound art, sound installation
- Years active: 1957–2009
- Website: https://www.max-neuhaus.estate

Max Neuhaus (August 9, 1939 – February 3, 2009) was an American musician, sound artist, and noted interpreter of contemporary and experimental percussion music in the 1960s. He created dozens of permanent and short-term sound installations during his career, which spanned four decades.

== Biography ==
Neuhaus was born on August 9, 1939, in Beaumont, Texas, and spent childhood in New York before moving to Houston, Texas, where he graduated from Lamar High School (Houston). He studied percussion with Paul Price at the Manhattan School of Music, graduating with a master of music degree in 1962. After graduation, he attended Darmstadt Summer Courses as well as performed as a percussion soloist on concert tours throughout the United States with Pierre Boulez (1962-1963) and Karlheinz Stockhausen (1963-1964). In 1964 and 1965, he presented solo recitals in Carnegie Hall in New York City and fifteen major European cities. In 1966, he released a recording via Mass Art Inc. involving four live realizations of John Cage's Fontana Mix (1958), an indeterminate graphic score originally intended for a tape piece, with or without additional instruments. Entitled "Fontana Mix-Feed," Neuhaus's realization employed controlled feedback generated by using his Max-Feed device, placing contact microphones on percussive instruments and hooking the microphones up to loudspeakers positioned directly opposite the instruments.

His work as a percussionist culminated in an album of contemporary solo percussion work, Electronics & Percussion - Five Realizations By Max Neuhaus, which he recorded for Columbia Masterworks in 1968, and was produced by David Behrman.

In 1968, he pursued a career as a contemporary artist by developing sound installations, using electronic or electroacoustic sounds which would emanate from a source within a particular space or location. He coined the term "sound installation" to describe his sound works, which were neither music nor events.

Neuhaus's first work as an independent artist was a series of walks called Listen (1966-1976). He invited audiences to walk with him through the streets of New York City, with the word listen stamped on their hand. As the work progressed, Neuhaus stopped leading the walks, instead sending postcards/stickers to audience members, that they can leave in their city.

Neuhaus's first permanent installation was Times Square in New York City. It is situated beneath a grate on a traffic island in Manhattan pedestrians are "enveloped by a deeply resonant and mildly undulating drone, its tone suggestive of low-pitched chimes or church bells." Originally installed from 1977 to 1992, it was restored in 2002 by the Dia Art Foundation.

Other works included penny whistles heard underwater in swimming pools, electronic sounds within an arboretum, and the modified sounds of listeners whistling tunes over public radio. Neuhaus' permanent sound installations are found in these locations:

- The Menil Collection, Houston, US
- Synagogue Stommeln, Stommeln, Germany
- Promenade du Pin, Geneva, Switzerland
- Gewerbeschule Bern (gibb - Berufsfachschule), Bern, Switzerland
- Times Square, New York City, US
- The Dia Art Foundation, Beacon, New York, US
- CAPC, musée d'art contemporain de Bordeaux, Bordeaux, France
- AOK Hessen – Beratungscenter Kassel-City, Kassel, Germany
- Castello di Rivoli, Turin, Italy
- Kunsthaus Graz, Graz, Austria

== Personal life ==
Neuhaus was married to Silvia Cecere in 1996, with whom he adopted a daughter named Claudia. Neuhaus died of cancer in his home of Maratea, Italy on February 3, 2009. He came from a family with a long history in engineering, including his great-great-grandfather Friedrich Neuhaus.

== Listed Works ==
Based on the works listed on the Max Neuhaus Estate website.

- 1966-79, Listen series
- 1966, Bi-Product
- 1966-67, American Can
- 1966-73, Public Supply
- 1967-68, Drive In Music
- 1968, Fan Music
- 1968, Southwest Stairwell
- 1968, Telephone Access
- 1971-74, Water Whistle series
- 1973-77, Walkthrough
- 1976, Round
- 1976-78, Underwater Music series
- 1976, (untitled), Rooms, P.S.1, Institute for Art & Urban Resources
- 1977, Radio Net
- 1977, (untitled), Documenta VI
- 1977, Times Square 1977-1992 (reinstated 2002)
- 1978, (untitled), Museum of Modern Art, New York
- 1978, (untitled), Stichting De Appel, Amsterdam
- 1979, Five Russians
- 1979-89, (untitled), MCA Chicago
- 1980, (untitled) Como Park, St. Paul, Minnesota
- 1983, (untitled) Bell Gallery, Brown University, Providence
- 1983, Time Piece, Archetype, Whitney Biennial, Whitney Museum of American Art
- 1983, (untitled) ARC 2
- 1983, (untitled) Kunsthalle, Basel
- 1983-90, (untitled) Villa Celle, Pistoia, Italy
- 1985, (untitled) Promenades, Centre d'Art Contemporain, Geneva
- 1986-88, (untitled) Domaine de Kerguéhennec, Locmine
- 1986-93, Works for One Person
- 1988, Sound Line
- 1988, River Grove
- 1988-90, Infinite Lines from Elusive Sources
- 1989, Two 'Identical' Rooms
- 1989-91, Bell for Sankt Cäcilien
- 1989-92, A Large Small Room
- 1989-93, Time Piece Bern
- 1990, Two Sides of the 'Same' Room
- 1990, (untitled) Lake Luzern
- 1990-93, Infinite Lines from Elusive Sources II
- 1990-present, Three 'Similar' Rooms
- 1992-present, Three to One
- 1993-present, (untitled) Musée d'Art Moderne, Bordeaux
- 1996-present, (untitled) Castello di Rivoli
- 1999-present, (untitled) Swisscom, Worblaufen-Bern
- 1999-present, Suspended Sound Line
- 1999, Intersection I, Venice Biennale
- 2001, (untitled) La Napoule Art Foundation, Mandelieu-La Napoule
- 2002-present, Times Square
- 2002-present, La Barma
- 2002-present, Promenade du Pin
- 2003-present, Time Piece Graz
- 2005-present, Time Piece Beacon
- 2007, Eybesfeld
- 2008-present, Sound Figure
- 2007-present, Time Piece Stommeln
