= 155 Mercer Street =

Building in New York City

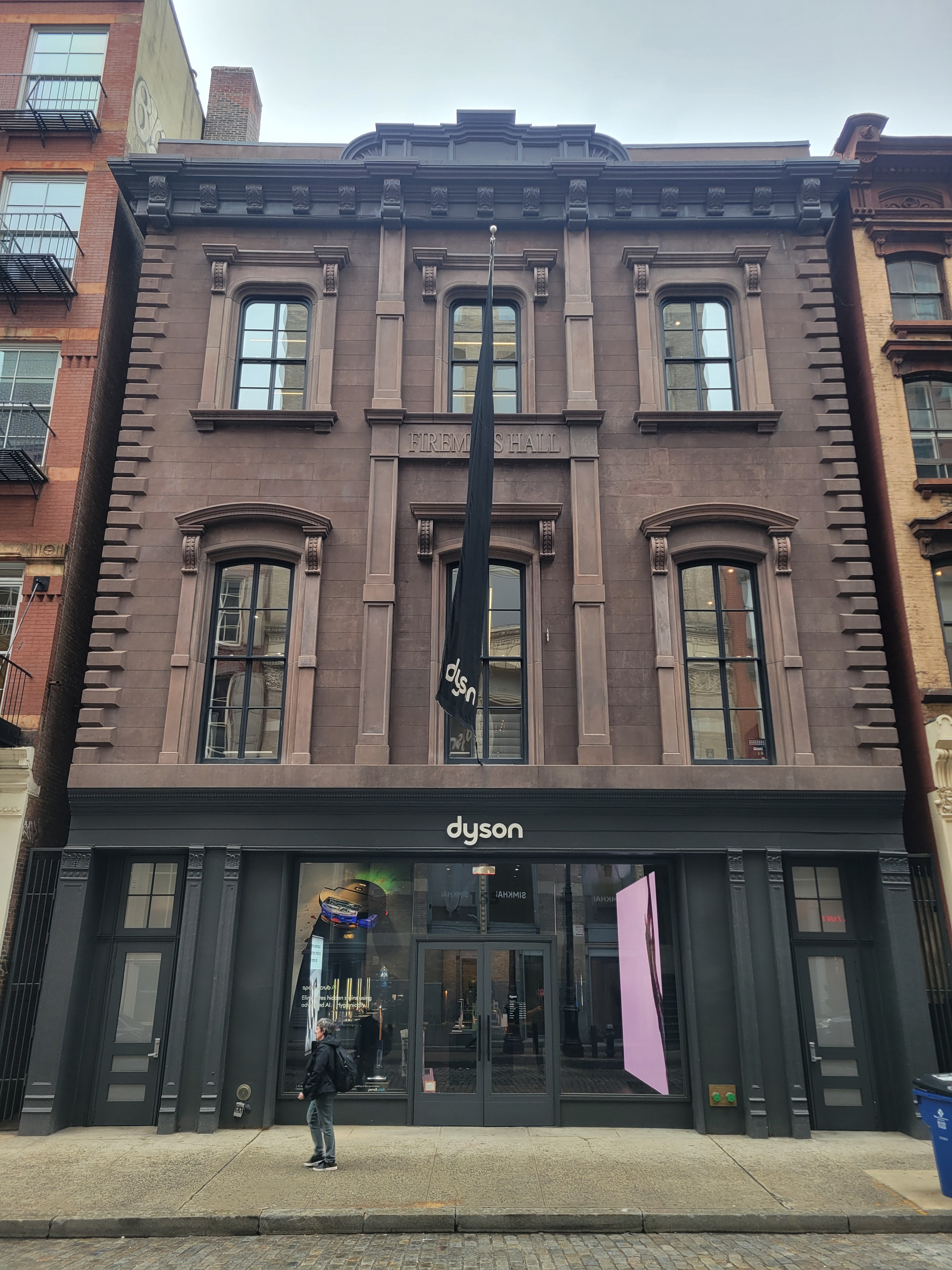
- 155 Mercer Street in 2026
- Interactive map of the 155 Mercer Street area

General information
- Architectural style: Italianate
- Location: 155 Mercer Street, New York City, NY
- Coordinates: 40.7252°N 73.9983°W
- Year built: 1855
- Renovated: 2013

Technical details
- Floor count: 3

Design and construction
- Architect: Field & Correja

155 Mercer Street is a former firemen's hall, now commercial building, located on Mercer Street, in the SoHo neighborhood of New York City. Built in 1855, the building featured an ornate façade designed by Field & Correja which was largely removed over a series of changes between 1893 and the mid-1970s. The last fire company left the building in 1974.

The Dia Art Foundation acquired the building, opening the Masjid al-Farah Sufi mosque within it in 1980. They also installed several Dan Flavin artworks in 1982. The mosque closed in 1985 with Dia turning the building into rehearsal and performance space largely for contemporary dance the same year. In 1996, while dealing with financial troubles, Dia sold the building to the Joyce Theatre Foundation who continued to run it as a rehearsal and performance space for contemporary dance. Joyce sold the building in 2012 after which it was renovated to echo its original design. 155 Mercer has since been used as a commercial property with a prominent storefront.

== History ==
=== Firemen's hall ===
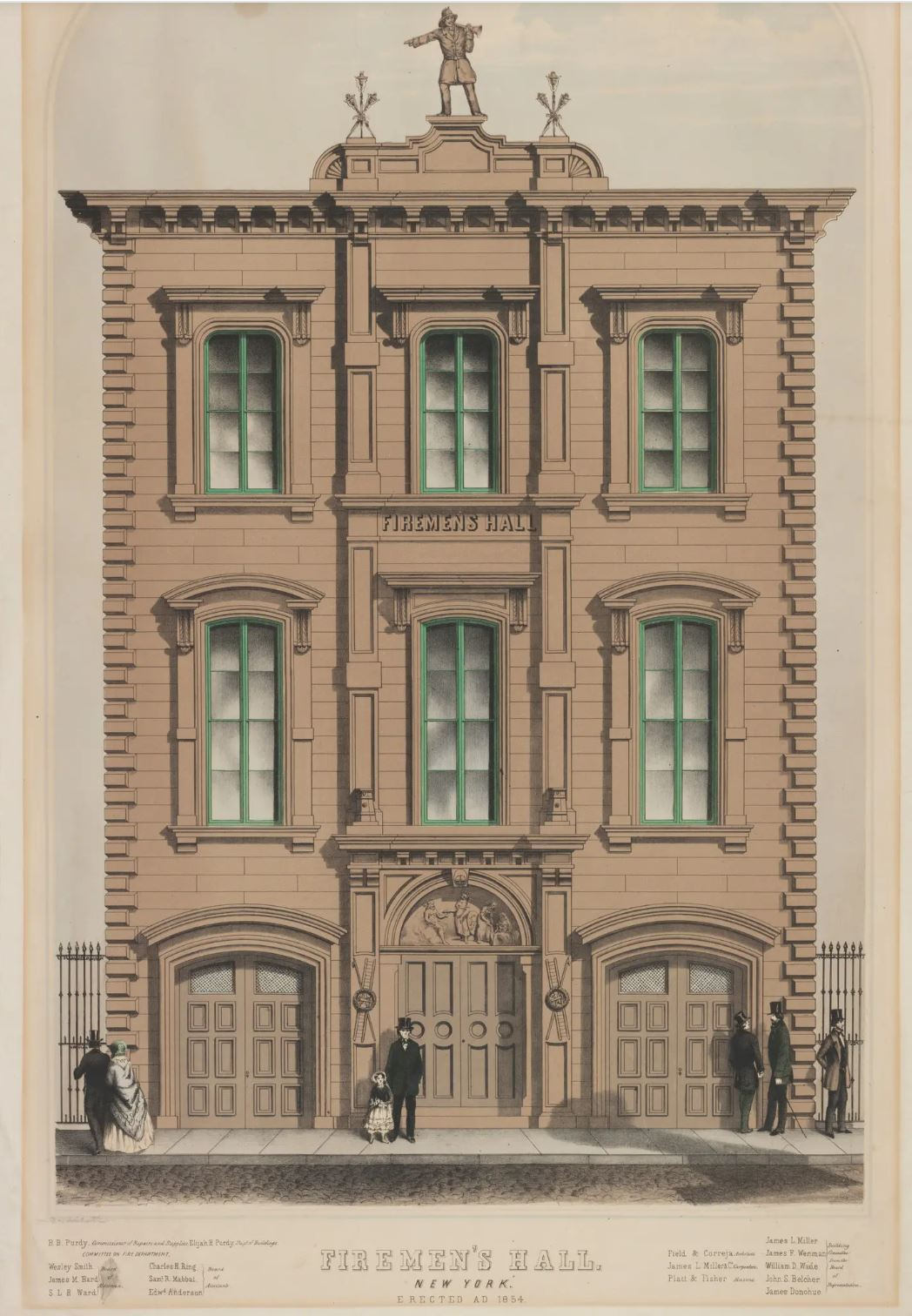
19th century print of Firemen's hall on Mercer Street

This building was originally built in 1855 by the city as the volunteers' headquarters for two fire companies on the site of a previous fireman's hall. It was designed by Field & Correja with carpentry work completed by James L. Miller & Co. and masonry by Platt & Fisher. The planned design of the brownstone building was described by The New York Times, at the time of the laying of its cornerstone, as Italian in style with a full size statue of a fireman above the cornice. This statue previously stood in front of the old fireman's hall at the site and was to be moved to the top of the new building. While drawings of this design exist, a late 1860s photo housed at the Museum of the City of New York of the building does not show a statue. The New-York Historical Society has a statue in its collection that is claimed to be the one installed on the roof here, but the trumpet is in its right hand while the drawings of the statue have it in its left.

In the cornerstone of the firemen's hall was placed a bible, the Book of Common Prayer, and a dime dated to 1800. Carved into the piers on each side of the central main doorway were items used by firemen, namely ladders, hooks and axes. A fire helmet was carved over this doorway. The upper two floors of the firemen's hall housed a library, a reading room, and meeting rooms. These rooms hosted a meeting about how to replace fire equipment that was destroyed when the New York Crystal Palace burned in 1858, and one of the early meetings of the National Rifle Association of America in 1871.

In 1865, the Metropolitan Fire Department replaced the series of volunteer departments that previously protected the city. In 1885, a headquarters for this new department was built which removed the need for the firemen's hall, leaving 155 Mercer purely as a firehouse. In 1893, the three ground floor entranceways were removed and replaced with cast iron columns and a cornice framing out two larger sets of doors.

Hook and Ladder No. 20 was stationed out of this firehouse and, beginning in 1895, had a ring-tailed lemur named Jenny as its mascot. A fire broke out in the firehouse one night; to wake up and alert the firemen, Jenny threw billiard balls down a flight of stairs. Jenny's death came about in 1907 after a burst fire hose soaked her and she caught a cold.

With the advent of motorized fire equipment, the two doors on the ground floor were consolidated into one large, central door, and a small pedestrian entrance off to the side, in the early 1900s.

=== Pellizzi Foundation ===
The building remained a firehouse through the first half of the 20th century; the last fire company vacated the building in 1974. Photographs taken shortly after they left show virtually all detail stripped from the façade of the building. In 1976, the building was auctioned. In the hopes of having choreographers Alwin Nikolais and Murray Louis purchase the building, a deed restriction was placed on it by Community Board 2 so that it could be used only for "modern dance performances, rehearsals and educational activities" according to The New York Times. Nikolais and Louis were outbid by the Pellizzi Foundation who intended to present dance in the building. The Pellizzi Foundation largely failed in its attempt to produce dance and transferred the building to the Dia Art Foundation in 1978.

=== Dia Art Foundation ===
==== Masjid al-Farah ====
The Dia Art Foundation purchased the stripped down structure, and in 1980, opened a Sufi mosque, named Masjid al-Farah, in it. The opening of the mosque was a reflection of one of the founders of Dia, Philippa de Menil's, recent conversion to Sufism. The mosque was created with Sheikh Muzaffer Ozak al-Jerrahi, who was given living quarters within the building.

Dia claimed to be presenting religious dance in the mosque, which it believed kept them in compliance with the restrictive covenant placed on the building. Dia tried multiple times to have the restriction lifted with community board member Doris Diether saying about Dia's purchase and use of the building, "Nothing happened for some time, then they opened with an art show... The Buildings Department closed the show down. They waited a while and tried again. Then they brought in whirling dervishes, which we decided were not modern dance either."

By 1980, the ground floor of the building was again reconfigured. A roll-up garage door constructed of metal and glass was installed in the center of the façade with hollow metal doors on either side of it.

In 1982, Dia commissioned, and installed throughout the mosque, a series of untitled light works by Dan Flavin. Dia maintained the building for religious use through 1985 while the Flavin works remained on display through 1987.

==== Rehearsal and performance space ====
After the closure of Masjid al-Farah, Dia turned the building into a space used for programing. The building was largely used for rehearsal and performance space for modern choreographers. Dia presented "The Salon Project" where, from 1986 to 1995, there were three yearly showings of new work from choreographers that rehearsed in 155 Mercer from the previous year. In 1987, Dia inaugurated two long running program series, "Reading in Contemporary Poetry" and "Discussions in Contemporary Culture," in this building.

The building held a 100-seat white-box theater. For two nights, the space was rented for $200 with all ticket sales going to the performers. Over the time Dia ran the building, over 90 choreographers had their work showcased in the theater space.

1n 1989, Dia presented a series of meetings at 155 Mercer under the title of Town Meeting project. These meeting were in relationship to exhibitions housed at their Dia Soho space. The first meetings were framed as "roundtable" discussions and were presented as part of the Democracy exhibition by Group Material (specifically its members Doug Ashford, Julie Ault, and Felix Gonzalez-Torres). These first meetings centered on education, electoral politics, cultural participation, and the AIDS crisis at the end of the Reagan era. The second group of four discussions, discussed housing, homelessness, and gentrification and how the artworld contributes to these issues. These town halls were organized by Martha Rosler as part of her exhibit If You Lived Here...

In October 1992, a group of 250 men from the arts world held a bake sale as a fundraising event for Women's Health Action Mobilization as a way to support the Women's Action Coalition at 155 Mercer. Baked goods were sold by artists and curators such as Chuck Close, Robert Gober, Eric Fischl, Brooke Alexander, and the then director of the Whitney Museum of American Art David Ross.

=== Joyce SoHo ===
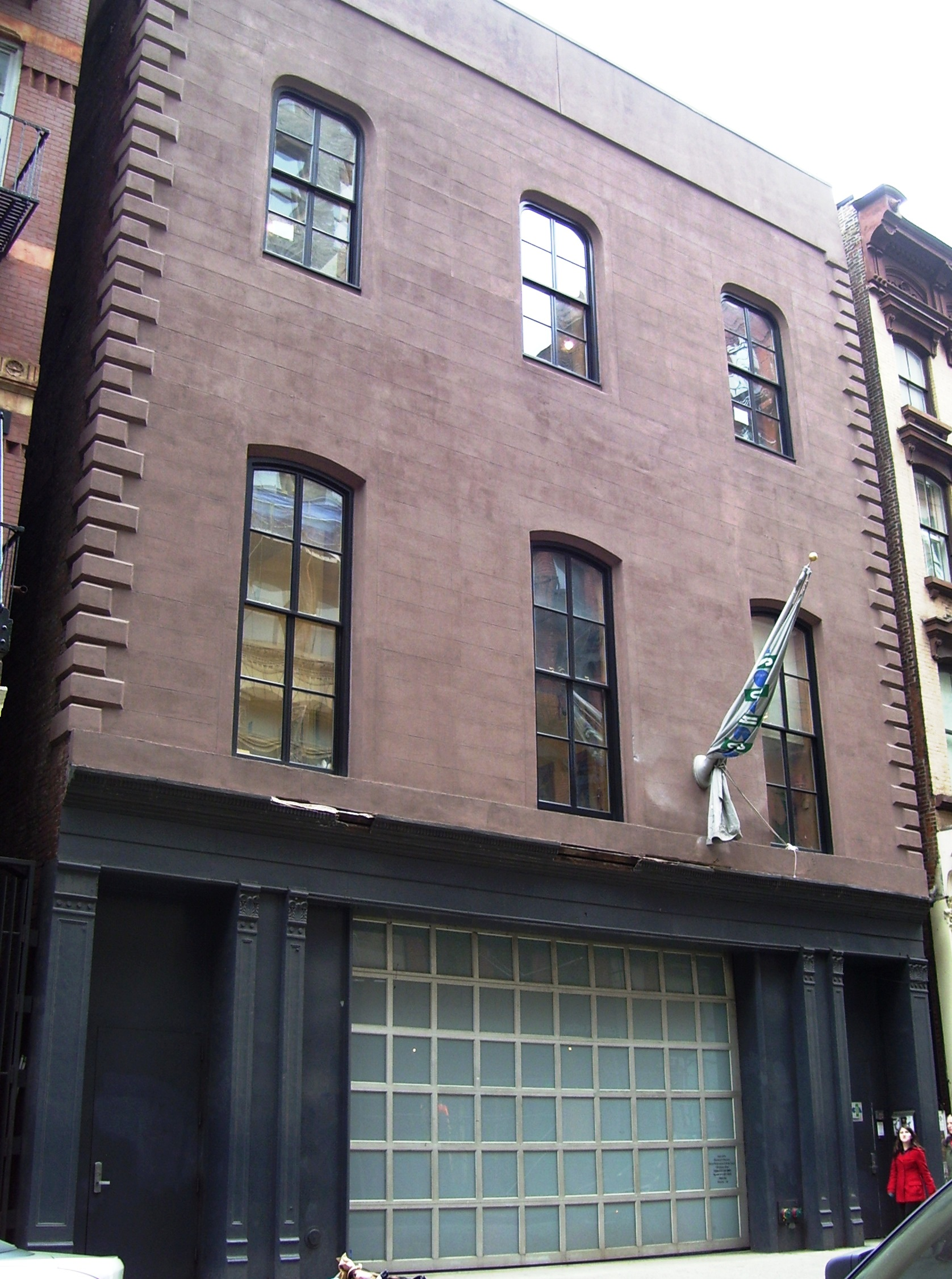
155 Mercer Street in 2011 as the Joyce SoHo

Rumors were circulating in 1994 that Dia was running into financial troubles and was looking to sell the building. January 1996 saw a change in Dia's board, and in October of the same year, it was announced that the building was to be sold to the Joyce Theatre Foundation for $1.5 million. The funding for this purchase was supported by the LuEsther T. Mertz Charitable Trust, the charitable organization established by the organization's longstanding benefactor LuEsther T. Mertz upon her death. During this sale the deed restriction forcing the building to be used only for dance was lifted.

The newly named Joyce SoHo housed offices, a rehearsal studio on the third floor, and a 74-seat theater on the first. The theater opened on October 23, 1996, with a $183,400 operating budget for its first year.

In 2012, the Joyce received, and accepted, an unsolicited $27.25 million offer for 155 Mercer from Thor Equities. The proceeds from this sale allowed the Joyce to purchase their main building in Chelsea.

=== Commercial building ===
In 2013, Thor Equities began work on restoring the building; the renovation referenced its original design but was not an exact replica. Thor, working with PKSB Architects, recreated the brownstone façade using concrete but retained the cast-iron front. Once the renovation was completed, the building housed a Dolce & Gabbana store for several years.

In 2016, ASB Real Estate bought a majority stake in the building for $93 million from Thor. In March 2023, Thor and ASB sold the building for $60 million to the firm Weybourne, associated with the British businessman James Dyson. The Weybourn Group planned to lease the building and create a Dyson retail store on the first floor.
