= Dia Chelsea =

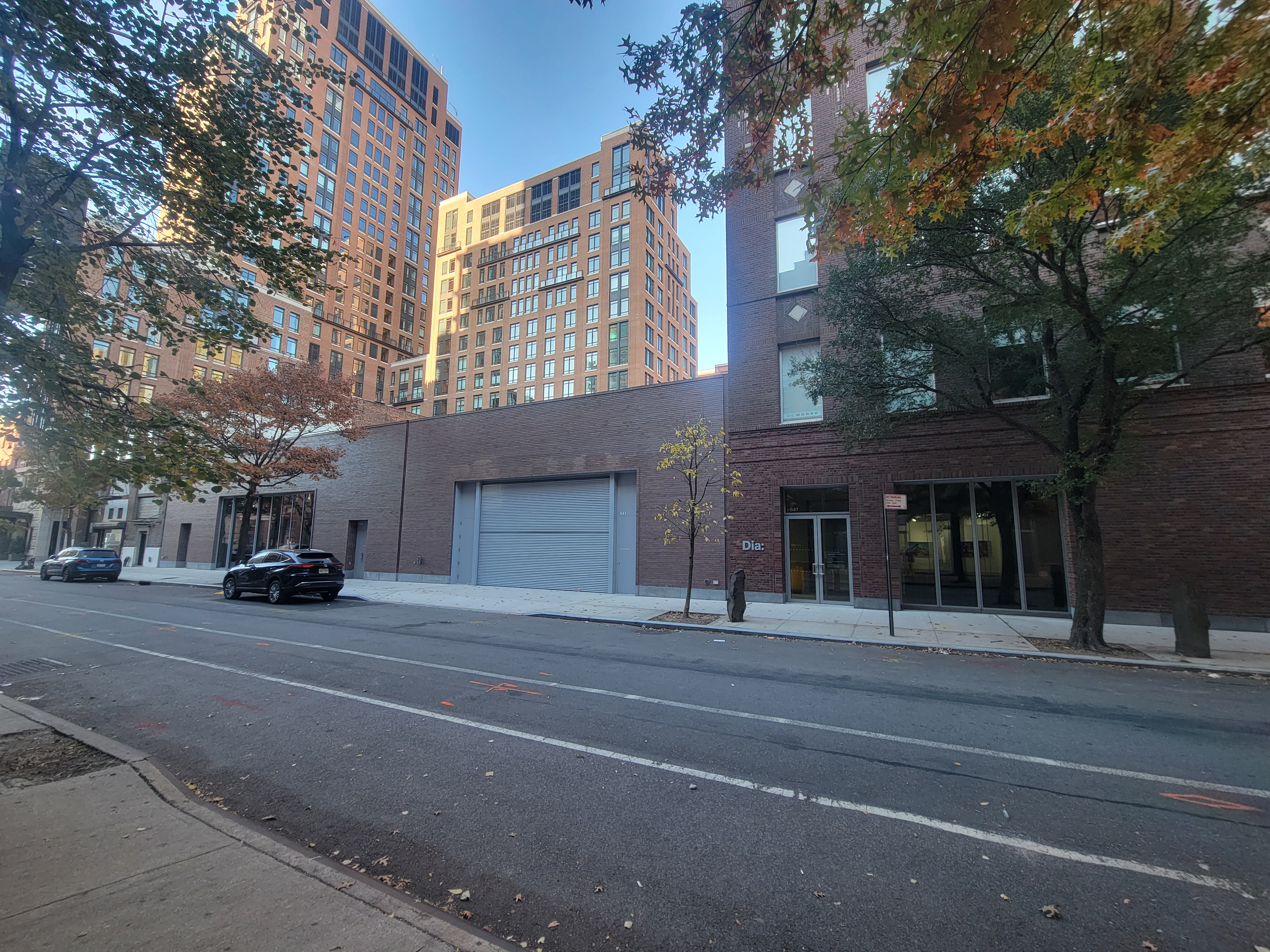
- The three combined buildings that make up Dia Chelsea
- Former name: Dia Center for the Arts
- Established: 1987
- Location: 537 West 22nd Street New York, New York, US
- Coordinates: 40.7478394220286°N 74.00629278874797°W
- Type: Art museum
- Collections: Modern and contemporary art
- Founder: Dia Art Foundation
- Owner: Dia Art Foundation
- Website: Official website

Dia Chelsea is an art museum in the Chelsea neighborhood of New York City and is operated by Dia Art Foundation. Opened in 1987 at 548 West 22nd Street as the Dia Center for the Arts, Dia Chelsea has since moved across the street to a series of connected buildings now consolidated at 537 West 22nd Street. It is one of the locations and sites the Dia Art Foundation manages. The Museum hosts longterm but temporary exhibitions dedicated to one or two artists at a time as well as associated artistic and educational programing.

== History ==
The Dia Art Foundation was established in 1974 in New York City by Heiner Friedrich and Schlumberger heiress Philippa de Menil, who would later get married, as well as Helen Winkler. The goal of the foundation was to assist artists in the creation of projects with scales and scopes that the standard museum and gallery systems could not support. In its first decade the foundation focused on supporting large installations in the American West as well as patronizing several artists, included Donald Judd, Dan Flavin, and Walter De Maria, with stipends, studios, and archivists.

Previous to Dia opening a museum in Chelsea it supported a studio and exhibition space for the artist Robert Whitman in the neighborhood. This space was in use between 1979 and 1985 at 521 West 19th Street.

=== 548 West 22nd Street ===
With the help of architect Richard Gluckman, Dia began renovating a four-story brick warehouse at 548 West 22nd Street to consolidated its program of exhibitions and expand its artistic programing. The building was particularly well suited for displays of art with 8,000 square feet of space on each floor, copious natural light from perimeter windows, a grid of supporting columns and a large freight elevator.

In October, 1987 the Dia Center for the Arts, opened as the first art museum in the Chelsea neighborhood. The first exhibits at the museum were by three German artists, Joseph Beuys, Blinky Palermo, and Imi Knoebel who each got an entire floor of the building dedicated to presenting their works in Dia's collection. These exhibits were followed by other long term exhibitions by artist such as Gerhard Richter, Bridget Riley, Brice Marden, and Jessica Stockholder. Through the 80's and early 90's Dia and the Kitchen were the sole arts art institutions in the neighborhood.

The building at 548 West 22nd Street became a model for how future Dia museum spaces would work with large spaces dedicated to single artists, or occasionally two artists in dialogue, showing work from Dia's collection and new large scale commissions.

In 2004, one year after Dia opened another museum, Dia Beacon, Dia closed the space at 548 West 22nd Street. Dia claimed this was due to the building not being able to handle the crowds it was drawing. When the Dia Center opened it attracted about 16,000 to 17,000 visitors a year. Before it closed for renovations in February 2004, attendance had grown to about 60,000. The extent of the repairs needed prompted the foundation to sell the building for $38.55 million in December 2007. Upon the closing of 548 West 22nd street, the site specific works in the building were disassembled and relocated.

=== 545 West 22nd Street ===
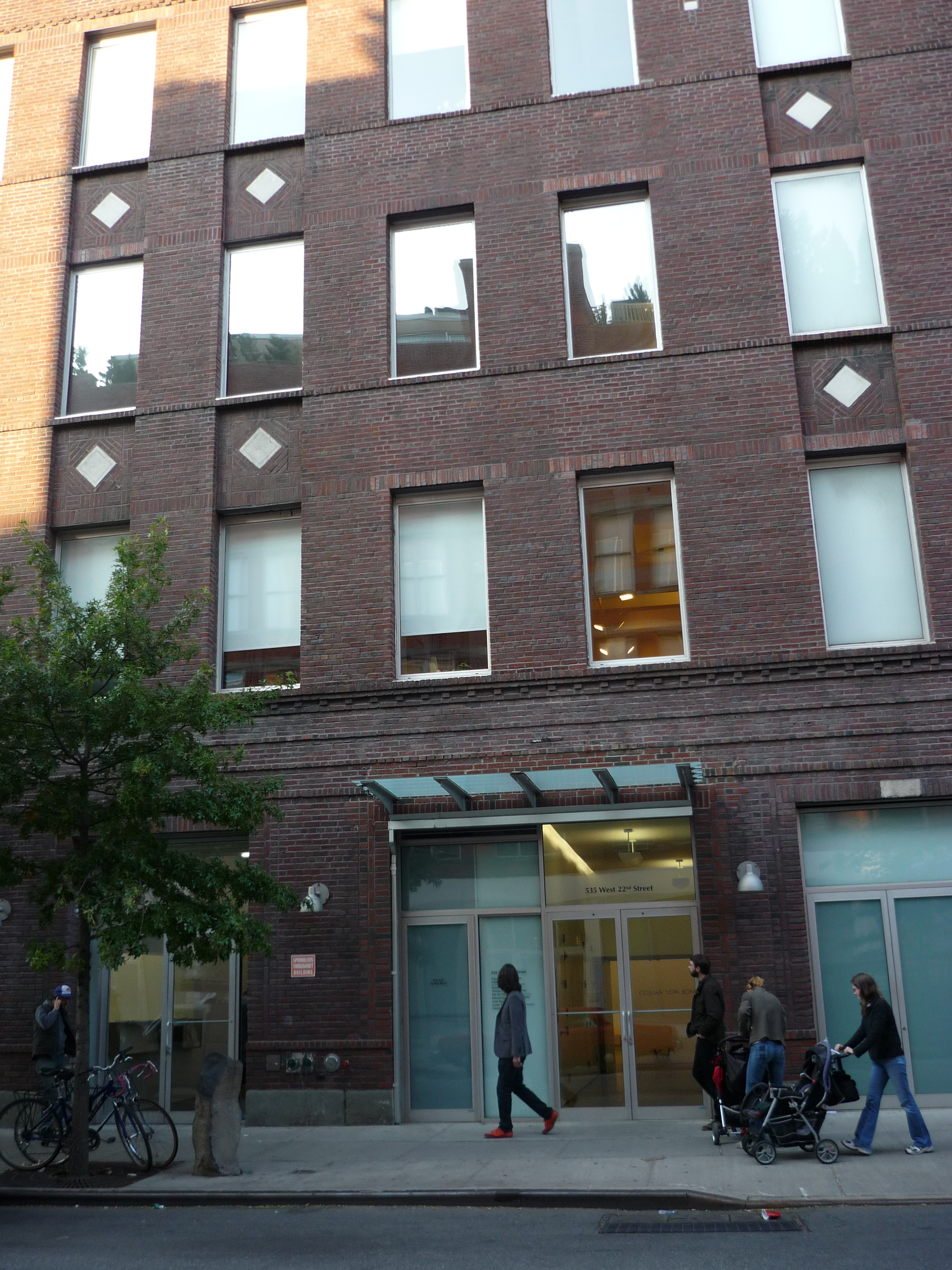
535 West 22nd Street before the 2021 renovation

In 1992 Dia bought 545 West 22nd Street, across the street from the Dia Center for the Arts. In 1997 Dia opened this building as a second gallery space on 22nd Street with an exhibition of the large scale Torqued Ellipses by Richard Serra that are now on view at Dia Beacon.

By 2011 Dia was leasing the building at 545 West 22nd to The Pace Gallery.

=== 535 West 22nd Street ===
The Fifth floor of 535 West 22nd Street begin hosting Dia's public programing in New York City in 2005. These programs continued being hosted here until 2019.

=== 541 West 22nd Street, Alcamo Marble Works ===
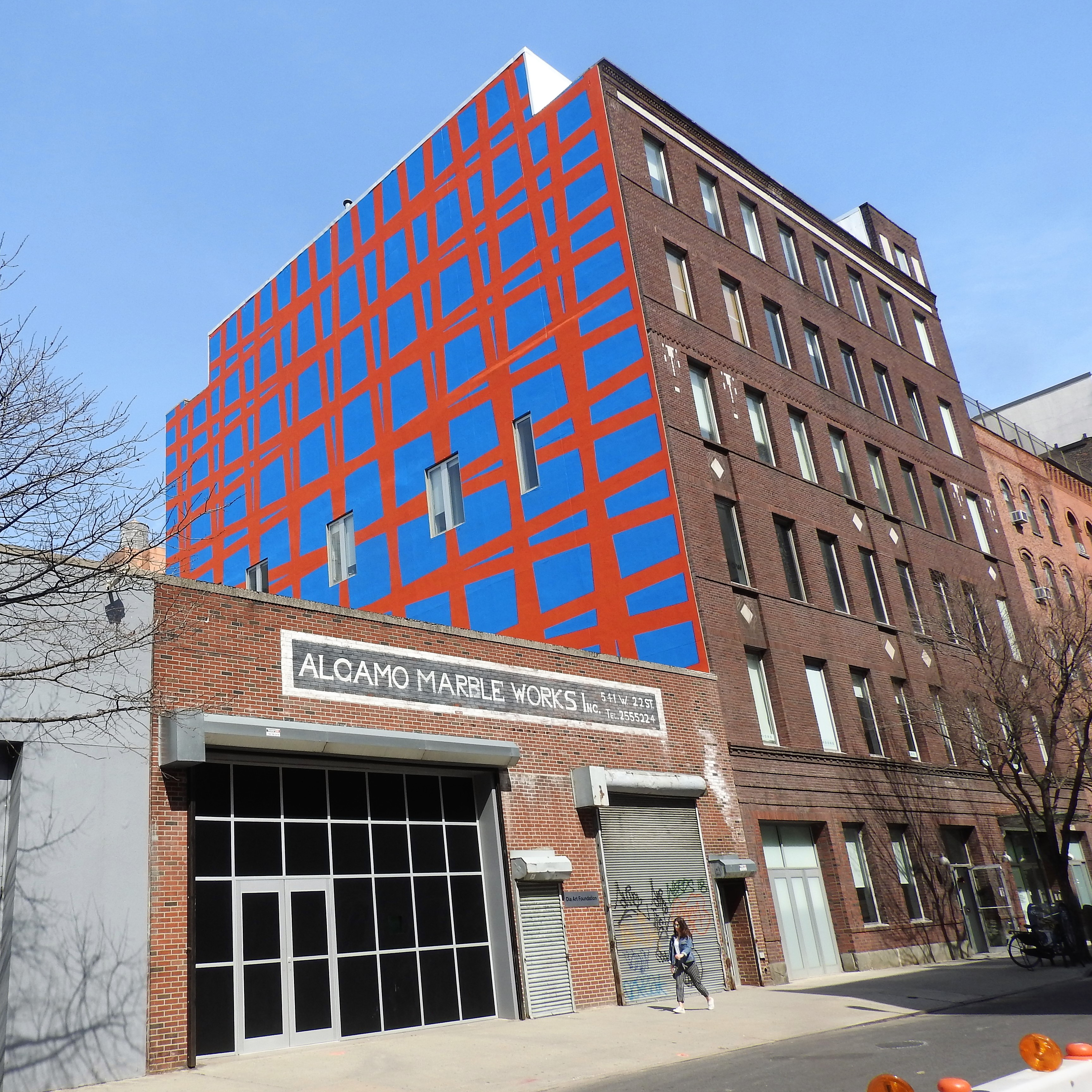
Alcamo Marble Works, 541 West 22nd Street, being used as a Dia gallery before the 2021 renovation

In June 2011 Dia purchased the building sandwiched between 535 and 545 West 22nd Street, the two buildings that hosted Dia programing. Dia paid 11.5 million dollars for 541 West 22nd Street, the home of the Alcamo Marble Works. Dia claimed the acquisition of this building was a strategic purchase. This building opened as another Dia gallery space in 2012 with an exhibition of Thomas Hirschhorn's Timeline: Work in Public Space.

=== Consolidation ===
Dia on West 22nd Street: 1 - 548 West 22nd Street 2 - 545 West 22nd Street 3 - 541 West 22nd Street 4 - 535 West 22nd Street 5 - 7000 Oaks site along street

Dia began as an institution dedicated to supporting long-term projects by living artists, and for several years, it was trying to raise money to build a space for such endeavors in Manhattan, after outgrowing its two locations on West 22nd Street in Chelsea and closing them in 2004. The foundation's board abandoned plans on opening a museum at the entrance to the High Line in 2006 after losing its longtime director, Michael Govan, and its chairman and benefactor, Leonard Riggio.

In November 2009 Dia's Director, Philippe Vergne, announced plans to reopen in Chelsea on West 22nd Street. In 2011, after years of negotiations, Dia bought the former Alcamo Marble building at 541 West 22nd Street, located between its former space at No. 545 and its existing six-story building at No. 535, for $11.5 million. Inside, these three existing brick buildings will be woven together to create three interconnected galleries on the ground floor. According to plans, the new Dia, designed by architect Roger Duffy, will include 15,670 square feet (1,456 square metres) of gallery space and 3,625 square feet (336.8 square metres) of rooftop for outdoor exhibitions like Dan Graham's Rooftop Urban Park Project (1991), an architectural pavilion fashioned from two-way mirrored glass that was originally installed on the roof of No. 548.

In 2015, incoming Dia Director Jessica Morgan reactivated three properties already owned by Dia in Chelsea at 535, 541 and 545 West 22nd Street, including re-launching the space at 545 West 22nd Street with an exhibition of La Monte Young and Marian Zazeela. From September 2016, Hauser & Wirth took over the old four-story space at 548 West 22nd Street as a temporary home while constructing its new building at no. 542. To adapt the space, the gallery enlisted Annabelle Selldorf.

In 2018, Dia announced a multi-year plan to revitalize its programmatic sites, including the renovation of Dia's current spaces at West 22nd Street to create a unified, 32,500 square feet (3,020 square metres) facility, including 20,000 square feet (1,900 square metres) of integrated, street-level exhibition and programming space across their three contiguous buildings. The new, renovated Dia Chelsea will open in fall 2020 and will present exhibitions, public programs and lectures, and will return Dia's bookstore to Chelsea.

== Long-term installations ==
Several long term installations, what Dia now calls sites, were built at 548 West 22nd Street including Rooftop Urban Park Project by Dan Graham installed between 1991 and 2004 on the buildings roof, and Untitled by Dan Flavin in the stairwells.

=== 7000 Oaks ===
The 1987 opening of the Dia Center for the Arts, at 548 West 22nd Street, included an exhibit on Dia's holdings of work by Joseph Beuys that stretched over an entire floor of the building. In 1988 Dia brought a rendition of his work 7000 Oaks to West 22nd Street. Dia installed "five basalt stone columns paired with five trees outside 548 West 22nd Street." This installation was expanded twice. The first was in 1996 with the addition of twenty-five new trees paired with a basalt stone column between 10th and 11th Avenues as well as the addition of seven columns paired to already existing trees. This brought the installation to thirty-seven trees and basalt columns. As a part of the 2021 renovation and consolidation of Dia Chelsea an additional tree and stone were added. There are currently Thirty-Eight pairs of trees and basalt stone columns stretching down the city block.

For the installation on West 22nd Street multiple species of trees are used, including the Bradford cultivar of Callery pear, common hackberry, Ginkgo biloba, Japanese pagoda tree, Japanese zelkova, littleleaf linden, pin oak, sycamore, and thornless honeylocust.

=== Untitled ===
the 1996 work Untitled by Dan Flavin was a site-specific installation of fluorescent light in the two stairwells of 548 West 22nd Street. it was Flavins last work that used fluorescent light as a medium. When 548 West 22nd Street closed in 2004, Untitled remained on view on long-term loan. The sculpture was considered one on Dia's sites but disappeared from Dia press releases between February 7, 2017, and February 24, 2017, and is no longer on view.

=== Rooftop Urban Park Project ===
Rooftop Urban Park Project by Dan Graham was on view on the rooftop of 548 West 22nd Street from 1991 to 2004, with the individual elements created between 1981 and 1991. The work consisted of a small urban park containing a pavilion created out of one-way glass, named Two-Way Mirror Cylinder Inside Cube, and a shed for viewing video art. When 548 West 22nd street closed in 2004, Rooftop Urban Park Project was disassembled and removed.
