= Berwick Gymnasium Arts Fellowship =

The Berwick Gymnasium Arts Fellowships were established in 1993 and were offered annually to professional artists who had demonstrated a consistent commitment to their art practice. The Fellowships were an internationally renowned programme open to all artists; national and international. Located in Berwick-upon-Tweed, England, the Fellowships were intended to give artists a period of time when they could reflect upon their practice and focus on the development of their work, responding to the border town of Berwick-upon-Tweed and its coastal location. The former military barracks, known as Berwick Barracks, that housed the studios and gallery space used by artists were built in the early 18th century to the design of the architect Nicholas Hawksmoor. The barracks were among the first in England to be purpose built. The fellowships were jointly funded by English Heritage and Arts Council England until 2011. The fellowships came to an end in 2011 after English Heritage announced funding cuts.

Fellowship holders

1993 Carole Drake
1994 Emrys Williams
1995 Mike Nelson
1996 Marcus Taylor
1997 Louise Cattrell, Paul Housley
1998 Perminder Kaur, Rosie Snell
1999 Virginia Bodman, Richard Walker, Fiona Crisp
2000 Shona Illingworth, Elpida Hadzi-Vasileva, Daniel Sturgis
2001 James Peel, Uta Kogelsberger, Zoe Walker
2002 Annie Cattrell, Marcus Coates, Geraint Evans
2003 Justin Carter, Tanya Axford, Enrique Jezik
2004 Alistair Gentry, Robert Scheipner, Semiconductor (Ruth Jarman and Joe Gerhardt)
2005 Grennan and Sperandio: The Conversationalists project for Berwick
2006 Nathaniel Mellors, Paul McDevitt, Nicky Coutts
2007 Simon Blakemore, Laura Napier, Urban Art: Anne Peschken and Marek Pisarsky
2008 Jason Minsky, Kim L Pace, William Cobbing
2009 Andro Semeiko, Neil Morley, Henna-Riikki Halonen
2010 David Wightman, Hannah Maybank (fellowship holders 2010/11)
