= Baan Gerda =

BaanGerda is a humanitarian non-profit organization that looks after AIDS orphans in Thailand. It is a project of the Bangkok-based Children's Rights Foundation. The small village community cares for over 70 children that were born with HIV and whose parents died of AIDS. The organization has no political or religious associations.

The children's homes have been built on land donated by a famous monk in the Lopburi province, approximately 230 kilometers north of Bangkok, Thailand. Unlike a state orphanage, BaanGerda has a unique operating model that provides family-style homes for orphans with foster parents looking after the children. All of the parents are HIV positive, thus ensuring they are sensitive to the needs of HIV infected children. It is the only one of its kind in Thailand.

== Founders ==
The founders of BaanGerda are Karl and Tassanee Morsbach, who were originally involved in building schools along the Thai and Burmese border. In total, five schools were built and are now operated by the border police, under the patronage of the King's daughter, Princess Sirindhorn.

They turned their attention to the growing problem of Aids orphans and opened the first family home at BaanGerda in 2001. It was built with their own money and the intention was to ease the children's suffering in whatever life they have left. When ARV medicine became available, their focus changed as the children were able to live with the disease and lead a relatively normal life. Over the next five years, several more homes were constructed as they were able to raise funds from within Thailand and abroad. In 2006, Germany honored Karl and Tassanee Morsbach for their humanitarian work by awarding them the Grand Cross of the Order of Merit.

== Facilities ==
As well as the family homes, BaanGerda comprises an infirmary center with six beds, a guesthouse, an administrative building, and an activities building. One of the most important features is called the “Kinderstern”, which is a multi-purpose building used for eating, a reception center for guests and other events. It was built with the financial support from the artwork Kinderstern (Children's Star), a social sculpture which stands since 1988 for the Children's rights and is made by the German artist Imi Knoebel.

== Workshops and vocational training ==
The recently constructed carpentry and sewing workshops were built to offer the parents a worthwhile job which could boost their confidence and earn them extra money. Many people infected with HIV in Thailand are excluded from jobs, as companies routinely screen potential employees. The production facilities play a vital role in the BaanGerda concept as it provides a vocation for residents and develops their self-esteem. There is also the opportunity for the children to take part in training, which is particularly useful for those that do not attend college later.

== Medical ==
Comprehensive medical treatment is available for all of the adults and children. This includes first and second line ARV medicine and regular blood testing to measure their CD4 count. The nearest hospital is located 35 kilometers from the village so everyday medical requirements are taken care of by the resident staff. The medical team distribute ARV medicine to each house and the parents are responsible for ensuring that their children take it at regulated times. Medical records are meticulously kept for each child including weight changes and lab results.

== Education ==
It is common for children infected with HIV to be excluded from school. However, the children of BaanGerda were fortunate to be accepted at a local school and follow the national standard curriculum. It is part of the King's Project and provides education for those from disadvantaged backgrounds.

== Documentary Film ==
"HEAVEN'S MEADOW. THE SMALL WONDERS OF BAAN GERDA" is a 90 min. documentary by German film director Detlev F. Neufert. It had its premiere in 2005 in Bangkok and shows the beginnings and the 'wonders' of this Aids-village in Thailand. It combines the personal lives of the children with BAAN GERDA as a model for the world and a greater view into the wheel of life. It has been screened internationally in cinemas, schools and universities and TV, even in Bhutan and in China where some billions saw it in CCTV. Hollywood director Wolfgang Petersen names it "a masterpiece".

"DANCING ON HEAVEN'S MEADOW". 2009. A 30 min. follow-up by film director Detlev F. Neufert about the life in the Aids orphan village Baan Gerda in Thailand. Ben, one of the leading kids in "Heaven's Meadow. The small wonders of Baan Gerda" is now 16 years old. How does he face his life as an Aids orphan and how does the development of Baan Gerda can help him and the other children to lead a normal life. The film has been screened in international TV stations.

DANCING ON HEAVEN'S MEADOW is the second documentary about aidsorphan Ben in Baan Gerda. In HEAVDEN'S MEADOW. THE SMALL WONDERS OF BAAN GERDA.' Ben was 8 years old. Now he is 16 years old with all the 'normal' conflicts a pubertarian boy has in this age. Director Detlev F. Neufert follows him with all sensitiveness and understanding of Ben's difficult situation.

BaanGerda features in the 2010 documentary Living with the Tiger. The film focuses on two of the children over a period of 3 years, and highlights the problems they encounter as they try to re-integrate back into their communities. The story is set in the context of their preparations for an ambitious performance in an opera.

Baan Gerda was also featured in one episode of the Wheel2Wheel documentary series where the team highlighted the issues faced by the children, their families and the orphanage itself before making a donation.
