= Galerie nächst St. Stephan =

Art gallery in Vienna

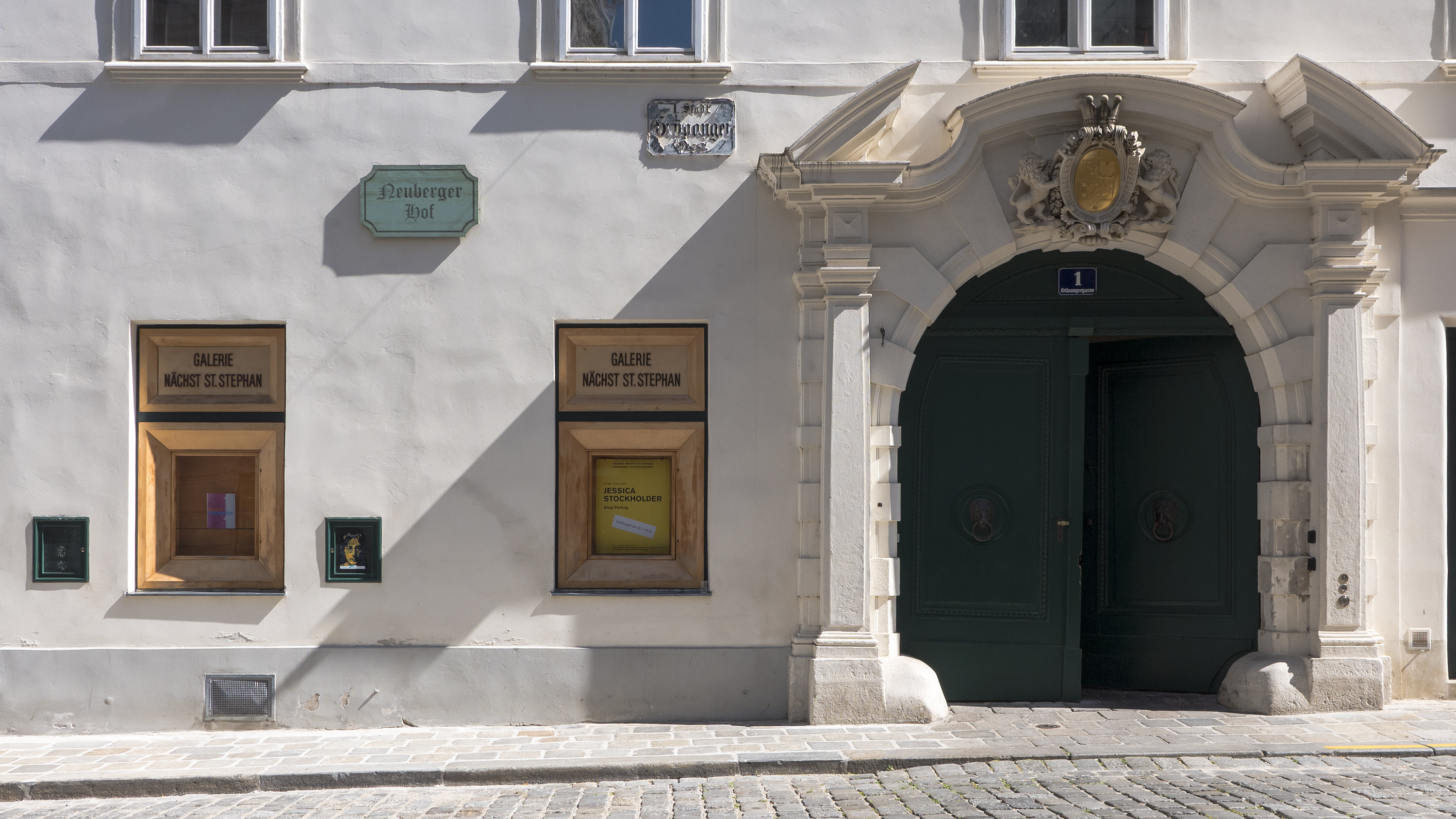

Galerie nächst St. Stephan is an art gallery in Vienna, Austria that was founded by Monseigneur Otto Mauer in 1954 on Grünangergasse next to the Stephansdom, where it is still located today. Rosemarie Schwarzwälder has owned the gallery since 1987. Before that, she was the gallery's director from 1978. Schwarzwälder has made the gallery the international renowned institution that it is today.

== History of the Site ==
The rooms in which the Galerie nächst St. Stephan is located have served as an art gallery since 1923, when Otto Kallir founded the Neue Galerie. Kallir (also Nirenstein) was Jewish and had to flee the country in 1938, when Austria was annexed to Nazi Germany. After living in Paris, he immigrated to New York, where he founded the Galerie St. Etienne ("St. Etienne" being "St. Stephan" in French). He is credited with introducing Gustav Klimt, Egon Schiele, and Oskar Kokoschka to the US. The gallery in New York still exists today and is run by his granddaughter, Jane Kallir. After he left Vienna, Vita Künstler served as the head of the Neue Galerie until 1952.

== History of Galerie nächst St. Stephan ==
In 1954, the painter Gertie Fröhlich introduced Otto Kallir to the then priest and future Monseigneur Otto Mauer, Otto Kallir wanted his daughter Eva Kallir, who was a friend of Fröhlich, to run the gallery in Grünangergasse; however Eva Kallir had no desire to pursue this career path. Fröhlich wanted to run the gallery herself, but was considered too young. Fröhlich then convinced Mauer, who had an affinity for collecting artworks, to run the gallery, and make her his confidant. As a student at the Academy of Fine Arts Vienna, Gertie Fröhlich was in a unique position to introduce her peers to Mauer. For example, she initiated and curated the first "Weihnachtsausstellung junger Künstler" [Christmas Exhibition of Young Artists]—which became a recurring event at the gallery.

Monseigneur Otto Mauer took over the gallery, giving it the new name Galerie St. Stephan (it was renamed Galerie nächst St. Stephan in 1964). Under this new name, the gallery would go on to become known as one of the most long-standing art institutions in Vienna. When Otto Mauer first founded the gallery, the cultural climate in Vienna was not very open to avant-garde art. He therefore took it upon himself to create a unique place where these artists could express themselves. With his dedication and remarkable intellect, he focused on content from the beginning. He created a platform for artists like Herbert Boeckl, Wolfgang Hollegha, Josef Mikl, Markus Prachensky, and Arnulf Rainer to exchange ideas about art. He was well-known all over Europe as an orator, collector, organizer, and friend of artists, and he worked to establish the gallery on an international level and initiated an active dialogue with the international avant-garde art scene. In 1958, he organized the first of many international art talks, bringing together art theoreticians and artists from Austria and the world in the Seckau Abbey in Styria. This taking stock of trends within contemporary art on a regular basis would become a gallery tradition that continues to this day. Otto Mauer remained the director of the Galerie nächst St. Stephan until his death in 1973. His gallery's program included Art Informel, contemporary architecture, installations (including those by Joseph Beuys), conceptual painting, and contemporary sculpture.

In the 1960s, the artist de:Oswald Oberhuber curated several exhibitions in the gallery in which he often included his own artworks. After Otto Mauer died in 1973, he became the director of the gallery and continued its tradition of art education. He was primarily interested in conceptual art, and he worked to present the newest trends in his gallery exhibitions. As an artist, his work was in permanent flux. In the 1970s, the Wiener Gruppe (a group of poets and writers) held readings at the gallery. The Viennese Actionism presented performances, and in 1975 Valie Export hosted the exhibition "Magna," which focused on female creativity. The Grazer Autorenversammlung (Graz Association of Authors) also held several readings in the gallery.

When Rosemarie Schwarzwälder became the gallery's acting director in 1978, she turned the gallery's focus toward specific projects. Because culture did not have a very high social standing in Vienna at the end of the 1970s, the Galerie nächst St. Stephan made it its mission to promote culture by organizing and hosting exhibition projects as well as other events, such as concerts, lectures, discussions, readings, and performances. It thus helped to create a climate that was more open to new artistic phenomena from outside of Austria.

Through projects revolving around so-called "new sculpture" and "new geometric art," the gallery gained a new standing in the international discourse. The exhibition "Zeichen – Fluten – Signale. Neokonstruktiv und parallel" (Signs, Floods, Signals: Neo-Constructivist and Parallel) in 1984 featured young Austrian, Swiss, and German artists like John Armleder, Helmut Federle, Imi Knoebel, Franz Graf, Brigitte Kowanz, Heimo Zobernig, and de:Gerwald Rockenschaub. The gallery thus turned its focus toward abstract art, conceptual art, and Minimal art and began also to work with American artists.

In 1987, Rosemarie Schwarzwälder became the owner of the gallery. Since then, she has consistently pursued two goals: to recognize current trends in art, and to approach these from a thematic, historical, and cultural point of view.

== Exhibitions ==
1984: "Zeichen – Fluten – Signale. Neokonstruktiv und parallel" (Signs, Floods, Signals: Neo-Constructivist and Parallel)

1986: "Abstrakte Malerei aus Amerika und Europa" exhibition and project juxtaposed two generations of artists from two continents and featured Helmut Federle, Imi Knoebel, Gerhard Richter, Robert Mangold, Brice Marden, and Robert Ryman.

1988: Jean Arp, Josef Albers and John McLaughlin, on the other hand, put the abstract artists represented by the gallery in a historical context.

1990: "Kulturen – Verwandtschaften in Geist und Form" explored parallels between twentieth-century abstract art and forms of abstraction from pre-Columbian cultures in South America, the South and Northwest of the US, Thailand, Japan, and China.

1992: "Abstrakte Malerei zwischen Analyse und Synthese" brought together two generations of European and American painters who engage with forms of contemporary abstract art. Following the tradition of Otto Mauer's international art talks, the Galerie nächst St. Stephan held symposiums for these exhibitions. These symposiums have also been published by the gallery, as well as catalogues featuring individual artists.

2009: the gallery and its artists were featured in a guest exhibition in the Palacio de Sástago in Zaragoza, Spain, in 2009.
