= Albert Kriemler =

Swiss fashion designer

- Born: 7 February 1960 (age 66); St. Gallen, Switzerland
- Label: Akris
- Awards: Swiss Design Award, Honoree of Fashion Group International Award

Albert Kriemler (born 7 February 1960, St. Gallen) is a Swiss fashion designer, and the creative director of his family-owned Swiss luxury fashion house Akris, which he held since 1980. He is known for his architectural and sleek approach with being described as a "modernist-designer."

== Early life ==
Albert Kriemler was born on the 7 February 1960 in St. Gallen. Kriemler grew up in St. Gallen with his parents and his grandmother, the founder of Akris, in a multilevel, multigenerational family home.

Since 15, he often accompanied his parents to fabric fairs. On a trip to Paris in 1976, Kriemler attended his first Yves Saint Laurent show. In the '70s, Kriemler's parents, Max and Ute, expanded Akris' scope, producing prêt-à-porter for such fashion houses as Ted Lapidus and Givenchy. Hubert de Givenchy became a friend of the family. Hubert de Givenchy became a friend of the family and after high school Kriemler planned to move to Paris for an apprenticeship under Givenchy and to study at the École de la Chambre Syndicale de la Couture. His plans changed when his father's key associate died unexpectedly. In 1980, at the age of 20, Kriemler was encouraged by his father to join the business as creative director.

== Career ==
Together with his brother Peter, President of Akris, who joined the company in 1987, Albert Kriemler continued to build the international presence of Akris.

At Akris, Kriemler continued St. Gallen's textile-based history by hiring local artisans, and modernized St. Gallen embroidery with an architectural approach.

In 1988, Dawn Mello, the fashion director and president of Bergdorf Goodman, visited Akris's showroom and placed the first order for an Akris collection for the renowned department store on New York's Fifth Avenue. In the 2000s, his designs became the top sellers at Bergdorf Goodman.

In 2004, Albert Kriemler began presenting Akris on Paris runways, incorporating contemporary art and architectural themes into his collections. He collaborated with artist such as Thomas Ruff (2014), Carmen Herrera (2017), Rodney Graham (2017), Alexander Girard (2018), Geta Brătescu (2019), Imi Knoebel (2021) and architects like Herzog & de Meuron (2007) and Sou Fujimoto (2016).

Kriemler collaborated with ballet choreographer John Neumeier to design costumes for the ensemble in Neumeier's 2005/06 production with the Vienna Philharmonic. They continued to work together on ballet projects for almost 20 years. Kriemler has designed costumes for Neumeier's choreographies such as: Epilogue (2024), Beethoven Project II (2021), Turangalîla (2016), The Legend of Joseph in Hamburg (2008) and Vienna (2015), and for prima ballerina Anna Laudere as Anna Karenina in the ballet of the same name, co-produced with the Bolshoi Ballet, Moscow, and the National Ballet of Canada, Toronto (2017).

In 2020, he collaborated with Dutch photographer and filmmaker Anton Corbijn on a five-minute fashion film about a collection that found inspiration in the work of artist Imi Knoebel.

For Akris' 100th anniversary, Kriemler co-curated an exhibition at the Museum für Gestaltung Zürich, that showcased original artworks and Akris collection side by side for the first time.

=== Style ===
Explaining his philosophy, Kriemler has said "you should notice the woman first, her dress second" and that clothes need to have "an awareness of individual personality." For him this is best described with the German word "selbstverständlich" (pronounced: zɛlpst.fɛɐ̯.ˈʃtɛn.tlɪç), meaning a feeling and appearance of effortlessness and ease.

Kriemler was one of the first designers to collaborate with Steven Klein and the then-budding model Stella Tennant for his first Akris campaign in 1995. He continued to work with photographer Steven Klein for 15 years and enlisted Daphne Guinness for his first handbag campaign in spring 2010.

His clientele includes women such as Jessica Chastain, Lilly Collins, Cate Blanchett, Lupita Nyong'o, Katie Holmes, Michelle Obama, Indra Nooyi, and Kamala Harris.

=== Innovations ===
Albert Kriemler is a pioneer in digital photo printing technology. In 2008, he presented a collection inspired by artist and friend Ian Hamilton Finlay. Images of Finlay's garden in Little Sparta, Scotland, motivated him to develop a new method for digitally printing photos onto sequins after two years of experimenting with Martin Leuthold, creative director of textile manufacturer Jakob Schlaepfer.

Since then, Albert Kriemler began blending digital technology with traditional craftsmanship. In 2014, he developed LED embroidery in collaboration with Forster Rohner inspired by Thomas Ruff's Sterne (1989–1992). One of these LED-embellished dresses was included in the permanent collection of the Museum of Applied Arts (MAK) in Vienna, Austria.

== Honors ==
Kriemler received the Grand Prix Design prize by the Swiss Federal Office of Culture in 2008 and awarded with the Swiss Design Award for his achievements as the "most important international ambassador for fashion creation in design." He was named the honoree for fashion design at the 2010 Fashion Group International Awards in New York.

In 2016, Wallpaper Magazine London awarded Kriemler the "Design Award 2016 Best Alliance" for the collaboration with architect Sou Fujimoto. In the same year, he received the 2016 Couture Council Award for Artistry of Fashion at The Museum of FIT in New York for his commitment to outstanding craftsmanship and "making clothes modern".
