= Hannah Maybank =

British artist (born 1974)

Hannah Maybank (born in Stafford 1974) is a British artist best known for the ripped and distressed surfaces of her three-dimensional paintings in acrylic. She graduated with an MA in Painting at the Royal College of Art, London, in 1999, following a BA (Hons) Fine Art from Liverpool John Moores University. She lives and works in London.

== Work ==
Maybank’s paintings contain elements from the natural world such as trees, flowers, clouds, and mountains. These natural elements are pared down to simple silhouette forms to act like motifs. Worked most often in monochrome, these motifs or templates are repeated across the surface of the paintings to create a patterning in both the visual composition and through the process of their creation.

Influenced from the mid-nineties by the works of Imi Knoebel, Agnes Martin and Ad Reinhardt, Hannah Maybank uses both construction and destruction to create works which echo our relationship to time and the natural world. The cycles within life, both birth and decay, are reflected by the process in which her paintings are made: layers upon layers of latex and acrylic paint are built up to be then stripped, cut and peeled away to reveal both the composition and lifespan of the piece.

Starting out as a series of black calligraphic like ink drawings, the composition of each painting is then pre-determined by a series of carefully worked, to-scale line drawings on layers of tracing paper. Sometimes running to a twelve layered and exactly registered set of drawings, these plans are then transferred to the surface of the painting at their pre-designated stage. Success or failure is often granted at the final stages of the making of each piece. The exactitude of all of the drawings is then perversely handed over to chaos, as the surface is ripped, ruptured and sliced and the picture revealed.

== Career ==
In February 2005, The New Art Gallery Walsall hosted Hannah Maybank’s first museum exhibition of paintings, including specially commissioned works such as Mounting Interference VI, 2005. The gallery subsequently purchased for their permanent collection Hosts (II), 2004.

In London’s Time Out magazine, in October 2005, at the time of her second solo show at Gimpel Fils, Martin Coomer wrote of the work:

“Most effective is a mountain range of triangular tears that discloses areas of yellow and orange, like molten ore beneath the earth’s crust. This is subtle and intelligent work; fluctuating between paint’s capacity for description and its presence as mere ‘stuff’, it appeals physically as well as mentally. The temptation to touch is as strong as the urge to pick a scab or strip bark from a silver birch.”

During October to December 2007, Maybank was artist in residence at ArtSway in The New Forest. To be created especially for the ArtSway main gallery space, the triptych Disclosure, 2008—her largest painting to date—was commissioned. In April 2008, this piece was exhibited together with a number of other paintings, and for the first time a set of working shellac ink drawings. In September of the same year, The Hatton Gallery, Newcastle, held a major overview of the artist’s practice. This exhibition also contained In Company, 2008—created especially to be shown alongside Kurt Schwitters's Merzbarn—and her painting The Visit—based upon Ian Fleming’s The Garden of Gethsemane, 1931, from the Hatton’s Historic collection.

In June 2009, The Visit, 2008, Carniferous Enclosure, 2008 and The Penultimate Invitation, 2009, were exhibited at the 53rd International Art exhibition – la Biennale di Venezia, 2009 as part of ArtSway’s New Forest Pavilion. The accompanying exhibition catalogue included an essay on the artist’s work entitled Gathering Life written by the critic and poet Cherry Smyth.

In 2010/11 she was one of two artists (the other being David Wightman) awarded a six-month residency as part of the Berwick Gymnasium Arts Fellowships in Berwick-upon-Tweed, Northumberland.
