= Rosemarie Schwarzwälder =

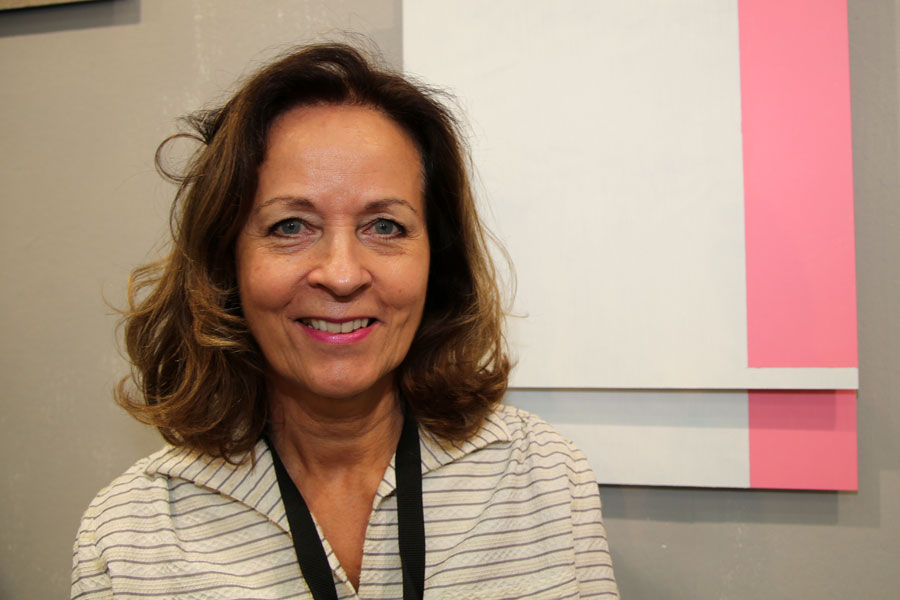
- Schwarzwälder at the 2013 Viennafair
- Born: 7 December 1945 (age 79); Basel, Switzerland
- Occupation(s): Swiss gallery owner, art dealer, and journalist
- Website: http://www.schwarzwaelder.at/

Rosemarie Schwarzwälder (born 7 December 7, 1945) is a gallery owner, art dealer, and journalist. She owns the Galerie nächst St. Stephan in Vienna, Austria, which is known worldwide for its program and participation in international art fairs. Schwarzwälder is interested in more than just presenting artists; she also engages in discussions about current trends in art and how they relate to ancient cultures.

== Biography ==
Rosemarie Schwarzwälder was born on 7 December 1945 in Basel, Switzerland. She attended the Neue Sprach- und Handelsschule (New College of Language and Commerce) in Basel, Switzerland, where she became fascinated with modern art through the Kunstmuseum Basel. After moving to Zürich, she worked at the Farner PR agency and was part of the team at the Galerie Daniel Keel. In 1970, she moved to Vienna, Austria, where she worked as a journalist for art magazines and the Austrian broadcasting cooperation. In 1978, she became the director of the Galerie nächst St. Stephan in Vienna, which was founded by the Catholic priest de:Otto Mauer, and she became the owner of the gallery in 1987.

== Life and work ==
=== 1978–1983 ===
In the Galerie nächst St. Stephan, Rosemarie Schwarzwälder initially focused on project-related exhibitions, accompanied by discussions, readings, performances, and concerts (occasionally together with the Wiener Musikgalerie). Artists represented by the gallery included Vito Acconci (1978), Joseph Beuys (1979), Terry Fox (1979) and Mario Merz (1983). During this time, de:Jochen Gerz created a portrait of her for his photo series Le Grand Amour.

=== 1984–1991 ===
The exhibition “Zeichen, Fluten, Signale - neukonstruktiv und parallel” (Signs, Floods, Signals: Neo-Constructivist and Parallel) in 1984 marked a change in direction in the gallery program, which today includes Geometric abstraction, Minimal Art, and Conceptual Art. From this point forward, Schwarzwälder began presenting the first solo shows in Austria by Imi Knoebel, Helmut Federle, Donald Judd, James Welling, and Dan Flavin. She also represents many Austrian artists, including de:Ernst Caramelle and de:Gerwald Rockenschaub. One of the crucial elements of Rosemarie Schwarzwälder’s approach to art education is enabling the comparison of different positions in abstract art. An example of this is the exhibition “Abstrakte Malerei am Beispiel von drei europäischen und drei amerikanischen Malern” in 1986. In 1990, she collaborated with Helmut Federle on a project in which works by contemporary abstract artists were juxtaposed with artifacts from ancient cultures in Asia and South America. For this project, she also hosted a symposium with experts and artists. During this time, the de:Erste Bank Österreich also asked her to establish and manage its international collection of abstract painting, Conceptual Art, and Minimal Art.

=== 1992–the present ===
Rosemarie Schwarzwälder has continued to represent the same painters over the years while also expanding the gallery's program since 1992 to include works by younger artists and sculptures and installations. The exhibition “Kunst Stoff” (2004), for example, combined textile art works by international contemporary artists with traditional artisanal textiles from all around the world, and the exhibition “Word + Work” (2013) addressed the relationship between artworks and artists’ texts.

== Memberships ==
- 1996–1999: Member of the advisory board of the Art Forum Berlin
- 2004–2005: Member of the advisory board of the Art Cologne
- 2006–2009: Chairwoman of the advisory board of the Viennafair
- 2006–2009: Committee member of ARCO Madrid

== Awards ==
- Goldenes Verdienstzeichen des Landes Wien (Golden Merit Award of the Federal State of Vienna) (1995)
- OskART, awarded by the Chamber of Commerce of Vienna (2005)
- Art Cologne Preis des Bundesverbandes Deutscher Galerien und Kunsthändler e.V. (Art Cologne Award of the Federal Association of German Galleries and Art Dealers) (2014)
- FEAGA Lifetime Achievement Award (2017)

== Publications ==
Rosemarie Schwarzwälder. Klares Programm, Galerie-Arbeit heute. Regensburg: Lindinger + Schmid, 1995. ISBN 3-929970-13-9
