= David Wightman (painter) =

English painter

- Born: 31 May 1980 (age 46); Stockport, Greater Manchester, England
- Education: Royal College of Art, London
- Known for: Contemporary art, landscape painting

David Wightman (born in Stockport, Greater Manchester 1980) is an English painter known for his abstract and landscape acrylic paintings using collaged wallpaper. The art critic Tabish Khan has said that Wightman has "invented a unique way of creating paintings using collaged wallpaper". He graduated with an MA in Painting from the Royal College of Art in 2003. He lives and works in London.

In 2003, after being nominated for the Lexmark European Art Prize, (and while still studying at the Royal College of Art), Meredith Etherington-Smith, former editor of Art Review, said of his short-listed piece: "David Wightman frames his picture perfect Swiss postcard in the cool collateral of a Ben Nicholson modernist painting".

In 2009, he showed a large site-specific painting: Behemoth at Cornerhouse, Manchester (2009) and went on to exhibit with Sumarria Lunn Gallery at The Hempel, London (2010). In 2010-11 he was one of two artists (the other being Hannah Maybank) selected for the Berwick Gymnasium Arts Fellowships - a six-month residency supported by English Heritage and Arts Council England. The residency took place in a Nicholas Hawksmoor designed former military gymnasium in Berwick-upon-Tweed, Northumberland. In 2013, he was commissioned by HOUSE Festival in Brighton (selected by artist Mariele Neudecker) to make a site-specific painting for a disused pavilion on Brighton's seafront. The piece (Hero) is the largest painting by the artist to date.

Cherie Federico, editor of Aesthetica magazine has said: "You must spend time with Wightman’s paintings; on the surface they are beautiful and intricate, but like the layers they are made from, there is so much depth to his works". In 2012 he had his first major solo show entitled Paramour at Halcyon Gallery, London. His work is held in several public collections including the Royal College of Art and General Energy UK. Wightman collaborated with the Swiss fashion house Akris as part of their Fall / Winter 2014/15 collection.

Wightman's first international solo show opened in October 2018 at Duran|Mashaal Gallery in Montréal, Canada. Wightman's last UK solo show My Atalanta opened in October 2021 at Long & Ryle, London. The gallery director Sarah Long has said of his work: "His landscape paintings are beautiful distractions. The intricate collaged wallpaper and unusual colour choices are compelling: they function as abstract compositions as well as imaginary vistas. His paintings offer a glimpse of another world - seemingly real yet entirely fictional".
