= Michael Loebenstein =

Austrian writer, curator, and museum director

Michael Loebenstein (born 1974 in Vienna) is a writer, curator and as of 1 October 2017 the director of the Austrian Film Museum (Österreichisches Filmmuseum). From October 2011 to January 2017 he held the post of Chief Executive Officer (CEO) of the National Film and Sound Archive of Australia (NFSA). From 2013 to 2023 he served as Secretary General of FIAF, the International Federation of Film Archives.

Previously he held senior positions at the Austrian Film Museum and at the Ludwig Boltzmann Institute for History and Society (currently operating as the Ludwig Boltzmann Institute for Digital History) in its historical research cluster. He worked as an advisor to the Austrian Federal Ministry for Education, Arts and Culture. He has also worked as a freelance curator and researcher in the field of audiovisual archiving and history, having particular interests in avant-garde and documentary film, Visual History and Holocaust Studies.

During his tenure at the National Film & Sound Archive of Australia the NFSA, like all Federal Cultural institutions, was impacted by budget cuts under the Coalition government's 'efficiency dividen' program. Despite significant cuts to the NFSA's programs and a reduction of its workforce Loebenstein repositioned the institution with a focus on digital transformation and public engagement. During his tenure, the archive increased its annual accessioning rate from 50,000 to 100,000 items and increased its capacity for digitisation of at-risk materials. In October 2015, the NFSA released "Deadline 2025: Collections at Risk," a strategy document warning that audiovisual material on magnetic tape would be lost unless digitized by 2025. The NFSA also reviewed its online activities and launched an award-winning website in 2015/2016.

Under Loebenstein's leadership the NFSA Restores program was launched in 2015, which digitally restored Australian films including Storm Boy(1976), Proof (1991), My Brilliant Career (1979), and Gallipoli (1981). The restoration of Proof was funded through Australia's first crowdfunding campaign for film preservation, raising A$27,000 from 266 supporters including actor-director Russell Crowe.

Under Loebenstein's direction, the Austrian Film Museum completed the 'Filmmuseum LAB' project, a new repository and digitisation facility in Vienna's Arsenal complex. The 1,500 m² facility, which opened in September 2025, houses the museum's collection of over 30,000 film titles in climate-controlled storage. The project was jointly funded by the Austrian federal government and the City of Vienna. Under Loebenstein's leadership the Film Museum developed a digitisation guideline. introduced a new digital collection management system, and modernised its cinema space.

As a writer Michael has published books on filmmakers including Peter Tscherkassky, Gustav Deutsch, Maria Lassnig and Ruth Beckermann. As a producer for the Austrian Film Museum's publication series he was involved in book releases on the Film Museum's Dziga Vertov Collection and on filmmaker James Benning. Notable publications include Film Curatorship: Archives, Museums and the Digital Marketplace (2008), co-authored with David Francis, Alexander Horwath and Paolo Cherchi Usai.

As a journalist, feature writer, commentator and editor he has contributed to numerous publications, books and articles on film history, curatorship and contemporary film culture. In addition he was a co-founder and editor of the German-language film periodical kolik.film and a critic for the Viennese weekly Falter.

He has been responsible for the production of several DVDs including the award-winning Entuziasm by Dziga Vertov (Edition Filmmuseum), and has collaborated with the celebrated film composer Michael Nyman.

As a curator he has been responsible for a number of large scale projects and exhibitions. In 2010 he curated the much-lauded Wien im Film at the Wien Museum in Vienna, a celebration of a century of images capturing the essence of the city. He also conceptualised and co-managed a series of digital humanities projects with the Ludwig Boltzmann Gesellschaft, including Film.Stadt.Wien, Ephemeral Films - National Socialism in Austria and Visual History of the Holocaust.

While in Australia he served as a member of the advisory board of the Centre for Media History at Macquarie University (Sydney) and the Wantok Music Foundation (Melbourne). As of 2022 he is a board member of the Austrian association of media archives Medien Archive Austria. He has also held positions including chair of the partner board of the Ludwig Boltzmann Institute for Digital History (since 2019), member of the board of trustees of the VALIE EXPORT Foundation (since 2023), and is an advisory board member of Kulturpool (since 2023).
