= Gertie Fröhlich =

Austrian painter and graphic designer (1930–2020)

Gertie Fröhlich (29 June 1930 – 17 May 2020) was a Czechoslovak-born Austrian painter, graphic designer and the initiator of the Galerie nächst St. Stephan in Vienna. She was an important figure in the post-war Austrian painting and experimental film world, where often from behind the scenes she supported numerous artists and institutions.

== Early life ==
On 29 July 1930, Gertie Fröhlich was born in Červený Kláštor, Czechoslovakia, where she grew up on a trout farm. Rising anti-German sentiment spurred on by the Fascist occupation of Czechoslovakia and the Beneš decrees led Fröhlich and her family to flee the country in 1944. They resettled on a family-owned farm near Vöcklabruck in Upper Austria.

== Education ==
In 1949, Fröhlich applied to study painting at the School of Arts and Crafts in Graz. In 1953, Fröhlich completed her preliminary studies under the tutelage of Expressionist painter Rudolf Szyszkowitz. Fröhlich then moved to Vienna to continue her studies at the Academy of Fine Arts Vienna. She developed her own style under the influence of Albert Paris Gütersloh. As Professor at the Academy and President of the Art-Club, Gütersloh influenced many emerging postwar Viennese artists and became known as the spiritual father of the Vienna School of Fantastic Realism. Although Fröhlich's figurative style was akin to Fantastic Realism and her close contact with the group, she never became a member. Fröhlich's lack of membership in an art group gave her greater artistic freedom. At the end of her studies, Fröhlich received the Herbert Boeckl Prize and a travel scholarship to study abroad in Sweden in 1956.

== Initiator of the Galerie nächst St. Stephan ==
Fröhlich's financial situation obliged her to work while pursuing her studies. In the summer of 1954, she found temporary employment at the Catholic Action as secretary of then priest and future Monsignor Otto Mauer. There she observed Mauer's affinity for collecting artworks and befriended Eva Kallir, daughter of renowned Austrian collector Otto Kallir. Due to his Jewish heritage, he was compelled to leave Vienna and abandon his gallery, the Neue Galerie, after the Anschluss. After the war, he wanted to leave the gallery to his daughter, who had no desire to pursue this career path. Fröhlich herself wanted to lead the gallery but was considered too young. Putting two and two together, Fröhlich convinced Mauer to take over the gallery and make Fröhlich his secretary and confidant.

Monsignor Mauer's vision for the Galerie St. Stephan (renamed the Galerie nächst St. Stephan in 1964) was to make it into a Catholic space, exhibiting his collection of graphic and painted works depicting Catholic or socialist themes. Fröhlich had other plans: as secretary, she ran the gallery in everything but name. As a student at the Academy, she was in a unique position to introduce her peers to Mauer. For example, she initiated and curated the first "Weihnachtsausstellung junger Künstler" [Christmas Exhibition of Young Artists]—which became a recurring event at the gallery. Her roster for the exhibition included herself as well as artists Johannes Avramidis, Wander Bertoni, Mareile Boog, Johannes Fruhmann, Elfi Glanner, Jakob Laub, Anton Lehmden, Josef Mikl, Kurt Moldovan, Josef Pilhofer, Markus Prachensky, Arnulf Rainer, Slavi Soueek, Carl Unger, Franziska Wibmer, Wolfgang Hollegha, Walter Eckert, Grete Yppen, Hans Staudacher, Clarisse Schrack, and Norbert Drexel. After this show, the Informel painters Wolfgang Hollegha, Josef Mikl, Markus Prachensky, and Arnulf Rainer decided to form a group eponymously tied with the gallery, "Die Gruppe St. Stephan" [The Saint Stephen's Group], and for the next decade dominated the Viennese art scene along with its namesake, the Galerie Sankt Stephan. Although Mauer is credited as the harbinger of the Viennese postwar avant-garde, it was Gertie Fröhlich who initiated the transformation of the relatively conservative, Catholic-minded gallery into the experimental space that is lauded today.

== Sonnenfelsgasse 11 as de facto Salon ==
In addition to her work at the gallery, Fröhlich supported the art scene by opening her apartment doors to her fellow artists.

== Personal life ==
In 1956, Fröhlich married the Austrian abstract expressionist painter Markus Prachensky. After her divorce from Prachensky she married the Austrian filmmaker Peter Kubelka, with whom she had a daughter, Marieli Fröhlich. In 1990, Fröhlich suffered a stroke, from which she never fully recovered. She died on 17 May 2020 in Baden bei Wien.

== Work ==
In 1960, Fröhlich started to work as a graphic artist at Austrian national public service broadcaster Österreichischer Rundfunk [Austrian Broadcasting] (ORF), painting captions and subheadings.

In 1964, Kubelka and his friend and fellow film aficionado Peter Konlechner founded the Film Museum to offer an alternative cinematic space for independent films in a postwar Vienna inundated with Hollywood and frivolous German-language productions (Heimatfilme). Fröhlich worked as its in-house graphic designer and produced the majority of marketing materials for two decades. She left her most iconic mark in her design of the Film Museum's emblem, the mythical sixteenth-century Zyphius fish. The allegorical animal swam on top of the water, had sharp teeth, and it would bite. It symbolized that the film museum would not go under and would bite if necessary.

Fröhlich also designed the film posters for the Film Museum. Receiving carte-blanche, she employed her fine arts education, integrating the fine and applied arts. Rather than designing simple film stills, each poster was an original artwork. Between 1964 and 1984, Fröhlich created over 200 original film posters. Her posters are now eagerly sought by collectors.

In 1967, Fröhlich left Vienna for New York. In New York, Fröhlich lived in the legendary Chelsea Hotel and worked for Holt, Rinehart & Winston publishing house in the graphics department for typography and layout. During her short time there, she befriended Kiki Kogelnik, Roy Liechtenstein, Robert Rauschenberg, Raimund Abraham and Jonas Mekas. By 1969, Fröhlich had returned to Vienna and her work at the Film Museum.

In 1976, Fröhlich made seven etchings based on Ovid's Metamorphoses. Her selection of myths addressed the female experience, often omitting male protagonists in her representations. In Ceyx and Alcyone, Fröhlich focused on the story of Alcyone. The piece depicts two moments in the myth: first, Alcyone drowning herself in the ocean over the news that her husband had perished in a storm; and second, Alcyone transforming herself into a kingfisher – a gentler fate than death, decreed by the commiserate gods who were moved by her suicide. The result is a dreamy, surreal image composed of soft, gentle, short lines that instill a feeling of movement in the form to complement its transformative content. The style, as well as the choice of subjects, unifies the series. Fröhlich chose to portray each female protagonist's moment of metamorphosis in each of the other pieces (Andromeda, Daphne, Arethusa, and Argus and Io). Although never explicitly self-identifying as a feminist, her choice to represent Greek myths would seem to have strong ties to feminist psychoanalysis. Additionally, her focus on the female protagonists in these representations is implicitly feminist. Yet, the subtlety of the feminist themes did not fit in with the provocative works of the feminist avant-garde artists such as Valie Export, who were emerging out of Vienna in the 1970s.

In 1977, the Katholische Bildungshaus [Catholic Education House] in the Aigen district of Salzburg paid Fröhlich 40,000 shillings to design and produce a tapestry for their interiors. Inspired by Matthew 6:25-34, Fröhlich designed two tapestries entitled "Lilien auf dem Feld" [Lilies in the Field] and "Vögel des Himmels" [Birds of the Sky]. These works led to a similar commission from the Zentralsparkasse branch at Franz-Josefs-Kai in Vienna.

In 1979, Fröhlich started designing gingerbread figures as Christmas gifts for friends, and they grew to be so popular that she started selling them, initially only in Austria. Through sheer talent, Fröhlich raised a new applied art medium, Christmas cookies – traditionally associated with women and the domestic sphere – to a level where they could be sold and be the foundation of a lucrative business. To meet popular demand, she involved her daughter Marieli, producing what became known as Fröhlich's Eat-Art-Objects.

In 1980, architect Luigi Blau introduced Fröhlich to Andrew Demmer, who asked her to be his graphic designer during the expansion of his grandfather's coffee company into the field of tea. Demmer credits Fröhlich with the name Demmers Teehaus.

In 1984, Fröhlich left Vienna to live in Berlin for several months. Still connected with the Viennese artists Oswald Wiener and Ingrid Wiener, she cooked in their legendary restaurant Exil in Kreuzberg.

== Exhibitions ==
In 1969, on the occasion of the tenth anniversary of the museum's opening, a celebration was organized, which included a film marathon and an exhibition of Fröhlich's posters. The British Film Institute to display her film posters at the National Film Theatre in London in 1975 and in 1978.

In 1974, at the age of forty-four, Fröhlich had her first solo exhibition of her at the Galerie am Rabensteig. Almost a decade later in 1985, Fröhlich had her second solo exhibition at the Peter Pakesch Galerie. Austrian writer Friederike Mayröcker contributed the piece "Profilblüte einer Frau (für Gertie Fröhlich)" [Profile flower of a woman (fur Gertie Fröhlich)] to the exhibition catalog. In 1987, Galerie Schwarz auf Weiß in Kreuzberg, not far from Exil, also organized a solo exhibition of Fröhlich's works.

Fröhlich's close friend, Austrian artist André Heller, invited her to show her Eat-Art-Objects at his amusement park of modern art entitled "Jahrmarkt der modernen Kunst, Luna Luna." The two artists were long-standing friends and had a history of collaboration. Out of appreciation for Fröhlich's work, Heller had asked her to design one of his album covers in the early 1970s. Heller commissioned Fröhlich to design an attraction to exhibit Fröhlich's Eat-Art Objects for the event. Heller had received a $500,000 grant from the German magazine Neue Revue and organized the event in Hamburg from 4 June to 31 August in 1987. Other participating artists were Jean-Michel Basquiat, Keith Haring, Roy Lichtenstein, Salvador Dalí, Sonia Delaunay, among others. Heller wanted to create "an amusement park designed by the most important artists of the period." For Heller, Fröhlich belonged to this category of artist.

In October 1987, the Branca Gallery, Inc., in Chicago, invited Fröhlich to display her Eat-Art-Objects. The Senior Vice-President of Tiffany's in Chicago displayed Fröhlich's Eat-Art-objects in its annual Christmas window displays. In 1988, the American Craft Museum invited Fröhlich to participate in "The Confectioner's Art" exhibition, composed of only edible artworks.

Even after suffering her brain stroke, she participated in the group exhibition "20 Jahre Moderne Kunst am Rabensteig" [20 Years of Modern Art at Rabensteig] at the Neue Galerie in Vienna in 1991.

In 1993, the city of Vienna awarded her an honorary professorship for her contribution to the arts. In addition to her paintings, that have been shown in numerous prominent galleries in Austria, her graphic design left its mark on the Austrian Film Museum.

In 2005, Fröhlich's close friend and advocate John Sailer organized a retrospective of her film posters at his co-owned exhibition space, Galerie Ulysses. It was her last exhibition before retiring in 2017 to the Hilde Wagener artist's retirement home in Baden bei Wien. In 2023–24 MAK, the Museum of Applied Arts, Vienna is showing the retrospective Gertie Fröhlich (In)Visible Pioneer, presenting her as a Gesamtkunstwerk, a total work of art: artist, craftswoman, Eat-Art activist, graphic designer, and influential networker of Viennese post-war modernism. The show is curated by Kathrin Pokorny-Nagel in creative collaboration with Marieli Fröhlich. During the exhibition the film WHAT'S HAPPENING? Art in the Life of Gertie Fröhlich (2023), a documentary by her daughter, the filmmaker Marieli Fröhlich, is being shown. The director interviews over 20 artists, friends, former collaborators and art historians whose recollections unveil the themes and the controversy surrounding Gertie Fröhlich's status as an artist, amongst them Peter Kubelka, Rudolf Polanszky, Elisabeth Samsonov, Barbara Steffen, Peter Pakesch, Julia Jarrett, Steven Pollock, Barbara Coudenhove Kalerghi and John Sailer, uncovering her influence on the post-war Vienna avant-garde starting in her early 20s. As the film unfolds, these contradictions come to a head: Is the existence of the most important Austrian post-war gallery, Galerie (nächst) St. Stephan, indebted to Gertie Fröhlich, or was she merely the good spirit and secretary? Was her retelling of Greek myths an analogy for her vision of a refreshed matriarchal psyche - a position of equal significance to manifestations and deterritorialization of the body by Austria’s feminist artists?

== Recognition ==
- Herbert Boeckl Preis (1956)
- Travel Scholarship to Sweden (1958)
- Hollywood Reporter's Annual Key Art (1980)
- Prize of the City of Vienna for Applied Arts (1980)
- Honorary Professorship from the City of Vienna (1993)
