= Art Cologne =

Annual art fair in Cologne, Germany

Art Cologne is an art fair held annually in Cologne, Germany and was established in 1967 as Kölner Kunstmarkt. It is regarded as the world's oldest art fair of its kind. The fair runs for six days and brings together galleries from more than 20 countries at the Cologne Exhibition Centre, one of the world’s largest exhibition centers. It is open to the public and attracts about 60,000 visitors. Art Cologne is well known for its impressive sales, with some of the artworks fetching millions each year.

== Background ==
The Art Cologne was the first art fair organized by and for commercial galleries to exhibit and sell Modern and Contemporary art. This kind of art fair distinguished itself from earlier art fairs such as the 57th Street Art Fair in Chicago or the Ann Arbor Art Fairs in Michigan, in which artists themselves marketed their works directly to the public from stands set-up in the streets. The Art Cologne and other international art fairs that followed offer private galleries conditions similar to their own back home: booths in buildings enabling them to present art works of high value.

== History ==
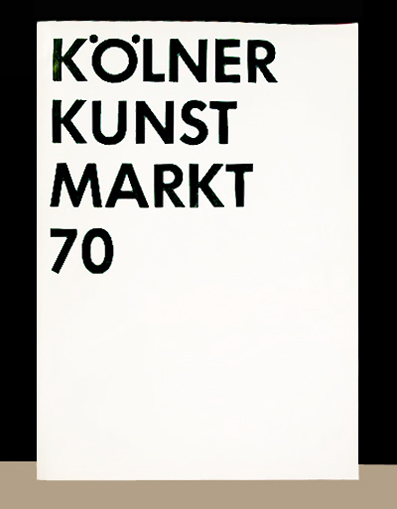
Catalogue cover

The Kölner Kunstmarkt was founded by gallerists Hein Stünke and Rudolph Zwirner in 1967 in an attempt to reinvigorate the weak market for contemporary art. With Bonn as the new capital city of Germany, the Rhineland – an industrial powerhouse at the centre of Europe driving the West German economy and acting as a hub for the entire western European economy – took over as the centre of the West German art world. The first Kölner Kunstmarkt took place in the Gürzenich festival hall in the medieval part of the city; the following year Kunsthalle Köln was added as an additional location. The fair helped to establish Cologne as a new center of contemporary art. A West German dealer and a West German artist set new records at the 1969 edition of Kölner Kunstmarkt: René Block sold a work by Joseph Beuys – known later as Das Rudel – at DM 110,000, making Beuys the first West German artist to beat the one-hundred-thousand-mark mark.

In 1974, Art Cologne moved to its current location, the tradeshow halls at the district of Deutz. On this occasion the name was changed to Internationaler Kunstmarkt (IKM). Between 1976 and 1983, the fair alternated between Cologne and Düsseldorf and began to establish its international credentials. Today's name Art Cologne was adopted in 1984. In 1994, the fair was bought by the event organizer Koelnmesse; exhibitor numbers at the fair swelled to 323 that year.

As the number of art fairs escalated, in the 2000s Art Cologne lost exhibitors and collectors to competing events in London, Basel, Berlin and Miami. With the emergence of the Berlin art scene, a bevy of remedies — special events and exhibitions, prizes and promotional gags — were devised to rejuvenate the fair, but they proved of little avail. An unattractive shift of venue within the fairgrounds and a change of dates from autumn to spring only exaggerated the unease of public and professionals alike. In 2007, the fair was moved to April from the fall to avoid coinciding with other events. Still, Art Cologne drew just 60,000 visitors that year, 10,000 fewer than in 2006, and the 2008 edition had only 55,000 visitors.

In 2008, Art Cologne abandoned its sister event on the Spanish island of Mallorca after just one edition and appointed Los Angeles gallery owner Daniel Hug, grandson of the Hungarian artist László Moholy-Nagy, to be its new director, part of a drive to boost attendance and win back top collectors and dealers. For the 2012 edition, Hug invited Nada, the Miami and New York fair for young artists, to join Art Cologne. The tie-up was first called Nada Cologne and has since renamed Collaborations.

In 2015, dealers specializing in Modern and post-war art got their own floor for the first time. The largest, middle floor hosted the fair's contemporary section, featuring international galleries such as David Zwirner, Hauser & Wirth, Michael Werner Gallery and Sprüth Magers. The third floor was devoted to New Contemporaries, the young galleries section sponsored by Deutsche Bank, and Collaborations. By 2016, Art Cologne and Nada ended the Collaborations segment; instead, Hug rebranded all the fair's contemporary art sections as "Neumarkt", named after an alternative Cologne fair in the 1960s.

In 2017, Art Cologne entered in discussions with abc art berlin contemporary to establish a new fair called Art Berlin. After three editions held at Berlin Tempelhof Airport from 2017 until 2019, Koelnmesse announced that Art Berlin would no longer take place.

In 2026, Art Cologne revived its Mallorca edition at the Palau de Congressos de Palma, with 88 galleries participating.

== Format ==
In 2008, Art Cologne's organizers chose 150 exhibitors of which about two-thirds were German. At the 2012 edition, German galleries made up 65% of the 200 international exhibitors. The number of exhibitors has remained almost unchanged ever since, with around 200 galleries from 23 countries taking part in 2015. The 2019 edition reduced the number of exhibitors to 176.

To meet basic costs of €35,000 for the simplest stand, a gallery owner needs sales of €200,000.

== ART COLOGNE Prize ==
The ART COLOGNE Prize is endowed with €10,000 and has been jointly awarded every year by the Bundesverband Deutscher Galerien und Kunsthändler (BVDG) (Federal Association of German Galleries and Art Dealers) and the Koelnmesse since 1988.

Past recipients have included the following:

- 1988 – Ileana Sonnabend
- 1989 – Harald Szeemann
- 1990 – Katharina Schmidt
- 1991 – Hein Stünke
- 1992 – Denise René
- 1993 – Annely Juda
- 1994 – María de Corral
- 1995 – Rudolf Springer
- 1996 – Peter Littmann
- 1997 – Dina Vierny
- 1998 – Gerhard F. Reinz
- 1999 – Otto van de Loo
- 2000 – Johannes Cladders
- 2001 – Ingvild Goetz
- 2002 – Frieder Burda
- 2003 – Werner Spies
- 2004 – Nicholas Serota
- 2005 – René Block
- 2006 – Rudolf Zwirner
- 2007 – Erhard Klein
- 2008 – Suzanne Pagé
- 2009 – Harald Falckenberg
- 2010 – Grässlin Collection
- 2011 – Michael Werner
- 2012 – Wide White Space Gallery
- 2013 – Fred Jahn
- 2014 – Rosemarie Schwarzwälder and her de:Galerie nächst St. Stephan
- 2015 – Hans Mayer
- 2016 – Raimund Thomas
- 2017 – Günter Herzog
- 2018 – Julia Stoschek
- 2019 – Christian Kaspar Schwarm
- 2020 – Wilhelm Schürmann
- 2022 – Monika Sprüth
- 2023 – Walther König
- 2024 – Karen and Christian Boros

== See also ==
- imm Cologne
- Art Basel
- Frieze Art Fair
