= Forest of Dean Sculpture Trail =

Coordinates: 51°48′23.5″N 2°33′9″W

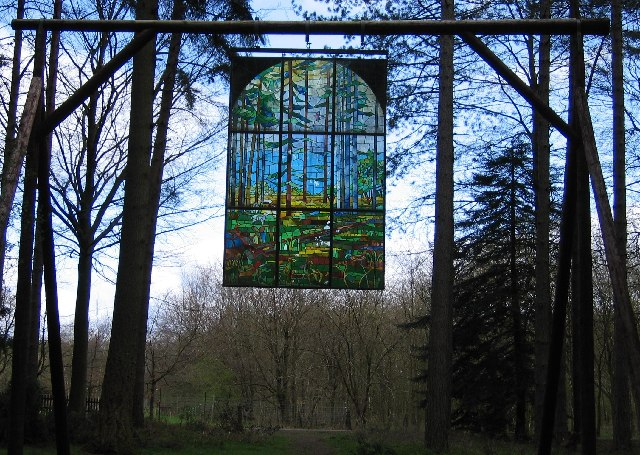
Cathedral by Kevin Atherton, one of the most iconic of the sculptures on the Forest of Dean Sculpture Trail.

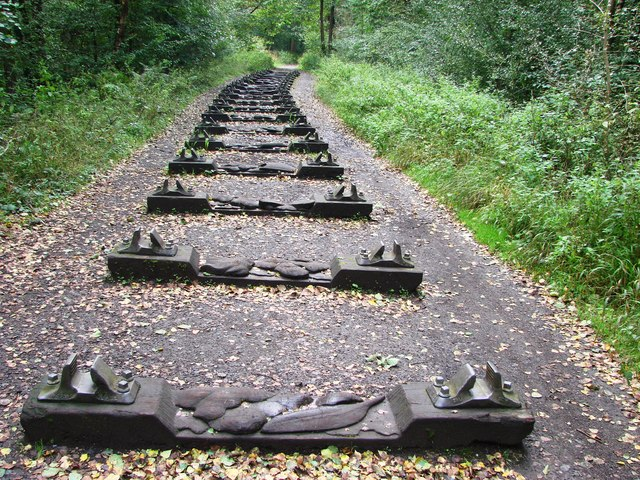
Iron Road by Keir Smith, carved from old railway sleepers and located on a disused railway embankment.

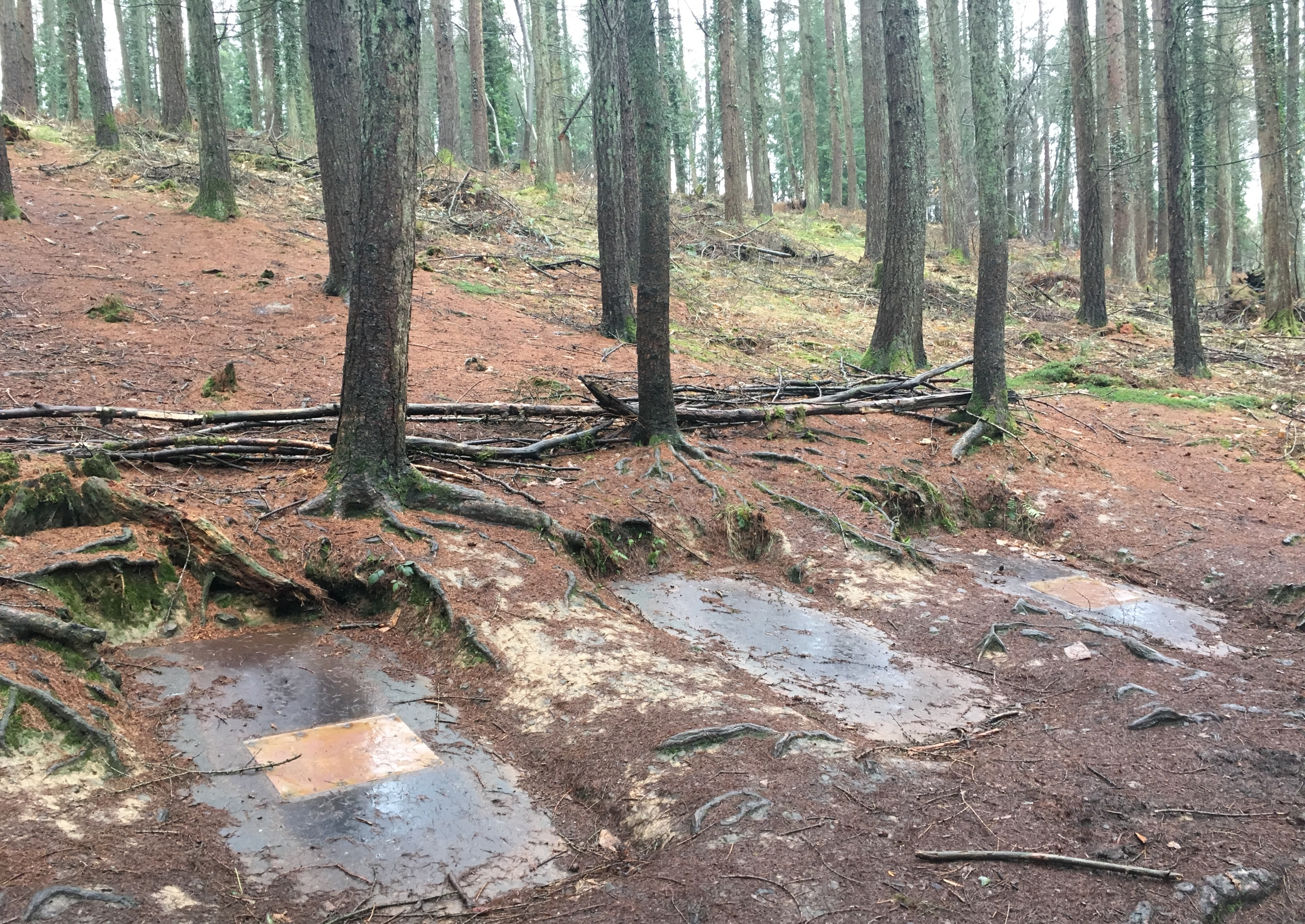
Dead Wood / Bois Mort by Carole Drake opened in 1995. The sunken steel plates suggest nameless graves in forests visited by war.

The Forest of Dean Sculpture Trail is a point of interest in the Forest of Dean in the county of Gloucestershire, England.

The Sculpture Trail links several different site-specific sculptures commissioned for the forest. It is open from dawn to dusk every day of the year. Admission is free, although there is a charge for car parking. There are currently 16 sculptures, made from various materials. A further 12 are no longer visible, or have been decommissioned due to safety reasons, and are being allowed to degrade naturally. The complete trail is 7 kilometers (4.3 miles); shorter routes of 3.5 and 4.8 kilometers (2.2 and 3.0 miles) visit a selection of the sculptures.

An estimated 300,000 people visit each year.

Commissioning commenced in 1986, originally in partnership with Arnolfini, Bristol's flagship contemporary art gallery, and following the establishment of the Trail has resulted in the presentation of more than 20 permanent sculptures, almost all of international significance, alongside temporary residencies and public events. The early sculptures were commissioned to be site-responsive and to interpret the forest, and the Trust adheres to this very particular strategy, which is what makes the Dean very different from other Sculpture Trails in the country.

Sculptures include Kevin Atherton's 15-foot by 10-foot stained glassed window Cathedral which hangs high in the canopy over the heads of walkers. Additional commissions include Neville Gabie’s Raw, a giant cube assembled from the entire mass of an oak tree, and acclaimed works by David Nash, Peter Randall-Page, Cornelia Parker and Annie Cattrell at crucial early stages in their careers.

The Forest of Dean Sculpture Trust continues to raise funds to commission additional works. The Trust (FODST) manages the Sculpture Trail, located at Beechenhurst, near Coleford in Gloucestershire, in partnership with the Forestry Commission in the Forest of Dean. The Trust is a registered charity and has a long record of commissioning sculpture and related temporary projects that are specific to the forest environment.
