= Kinderstern =

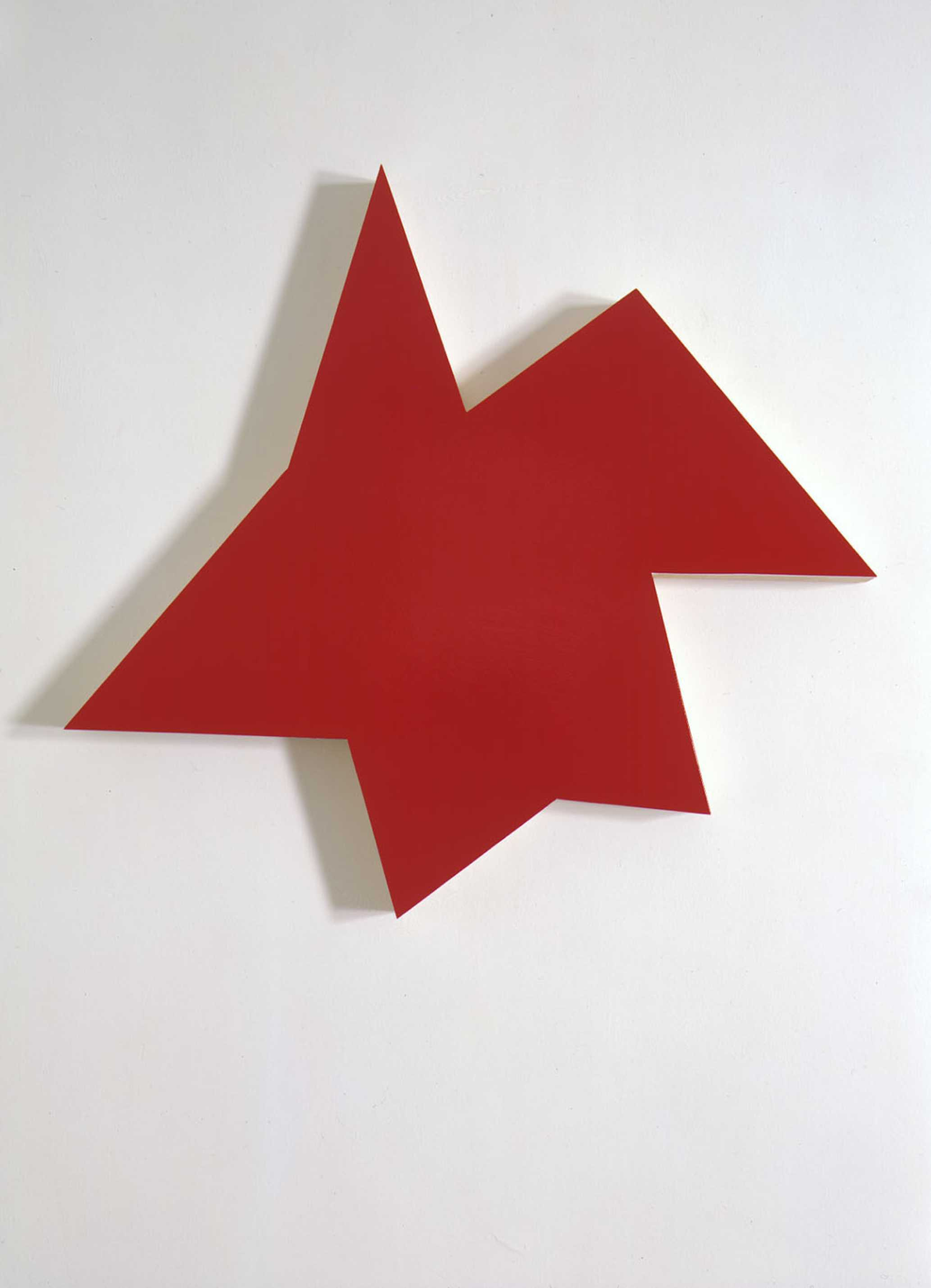
Kinderstern-Logo

Kinderstern/Star for Children is an artwork series the German artist Imi Knoebel has created since 1988. The artwork is entirely donated to projects for children in need. The Star for Children has so far collected donations of four million Euros and is the only artwork worldwide from which 100% of proceeds go to children in need. The "Star for Children in Need" receives support through artists and collectors, musicians and actors/actresses, museums like Deutsche Guggenheim in Berlin and Sammlung Grässlin in the Blackforest and art fairs.

== History ==
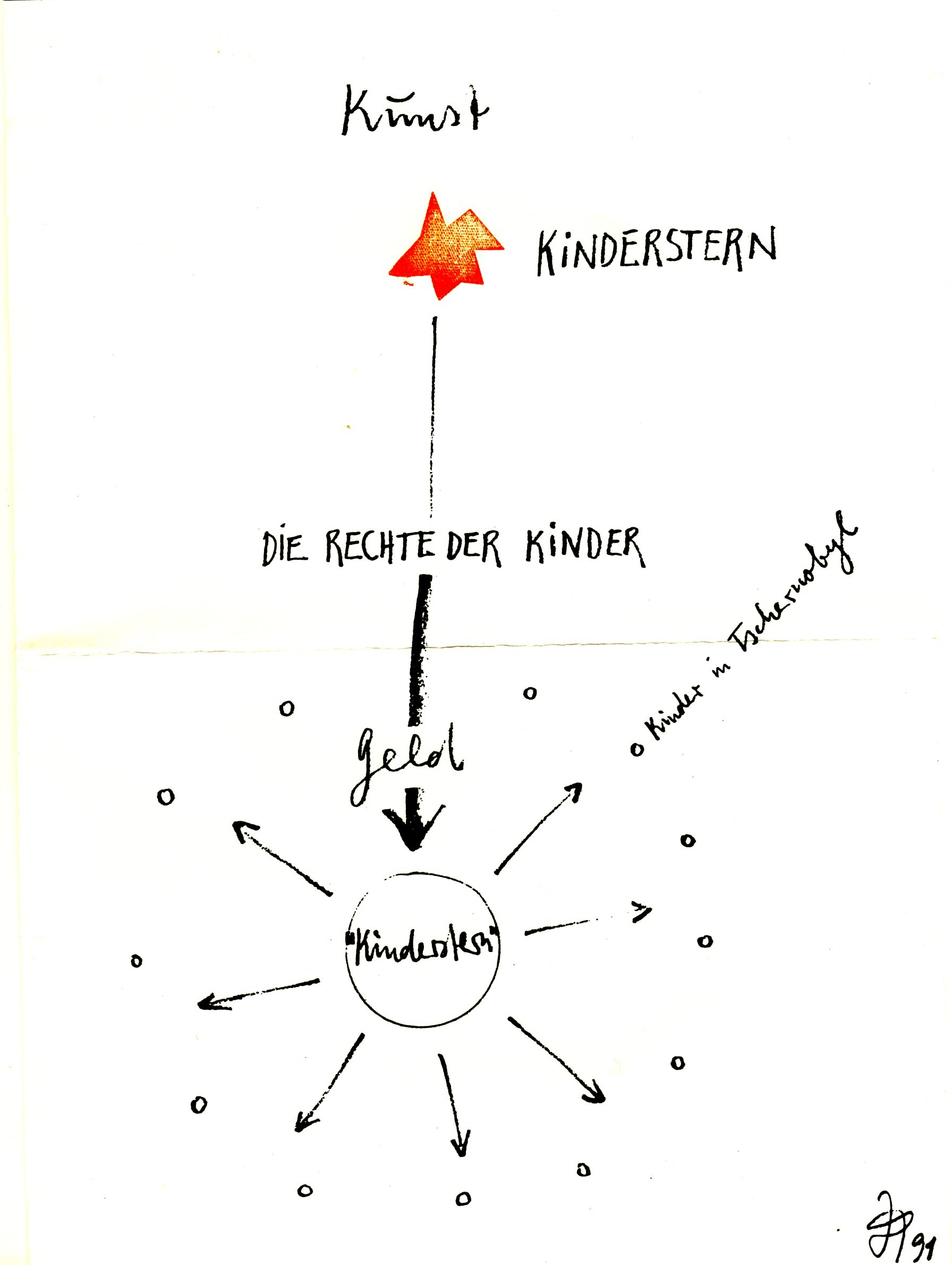
Drawing by Johannes Stuettgen. Art transforms itself to stand for children's rights.

The Kinderstern is a social sculpture formulated in 1967 by Joseph Beuys.

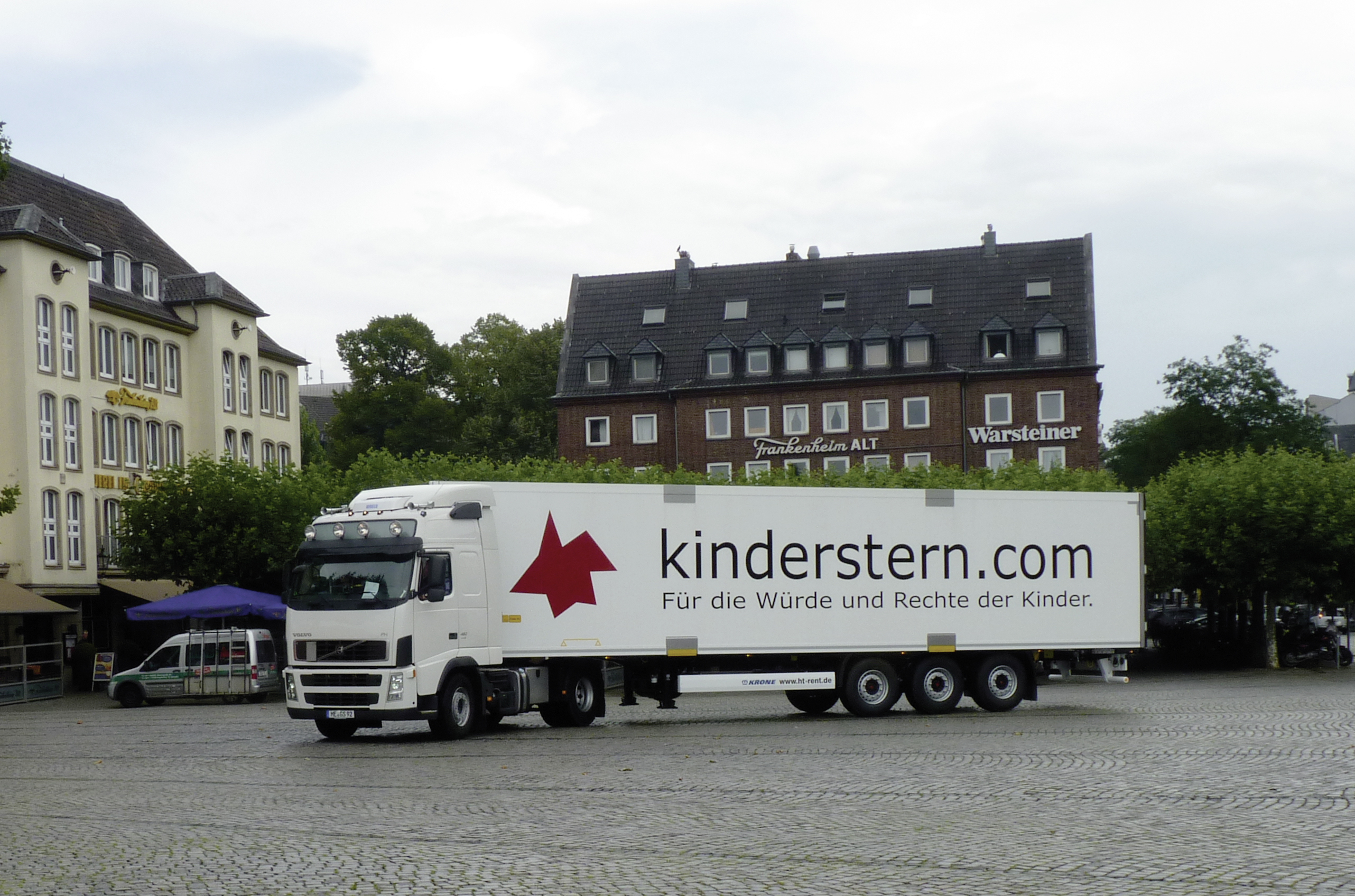
Kinderstern on tour 2011

In 1988, the Star for Children was printed for the first time as silkscreen in red. This print was, next to original prints from the artists Sol LeWitt, Jörg Immendorff, Sigmar Polke, Max Bill, Heinz Mack, Keith Haring, part of a portfolio created under the auspices of Lothar Späth, minister-president of Baden-Württemberg/Germany. Title of the portfolio: "Kinderstern"/Star for Children. Its proceeds supported the financing of accommodations for parents close to pediatric clinics.

In 2016, Knoebel told collectors not to buy the Kinderstern at auctions, stating that the auction houses overpriced the art.

== Exhibitions ==
- 1991 Art Cologne
- 1993 Art Frankfurt
- 2010 Art Cologne
- 2010 art forum berlin
- 2011 Pure Freude Düsseldorf
- 2012 Herberholz Frankfurt
- 2014: Pure Freude Düsseldorf
- 2015: Pure Freude Düsseldorf
- 2016: Pure Freude Düsseldorf
- 2016: Herberholz Frankfurt
- 2017: Pure Freude Düsseldorf

== Kinderstern Sponsorships and Cooperations ==
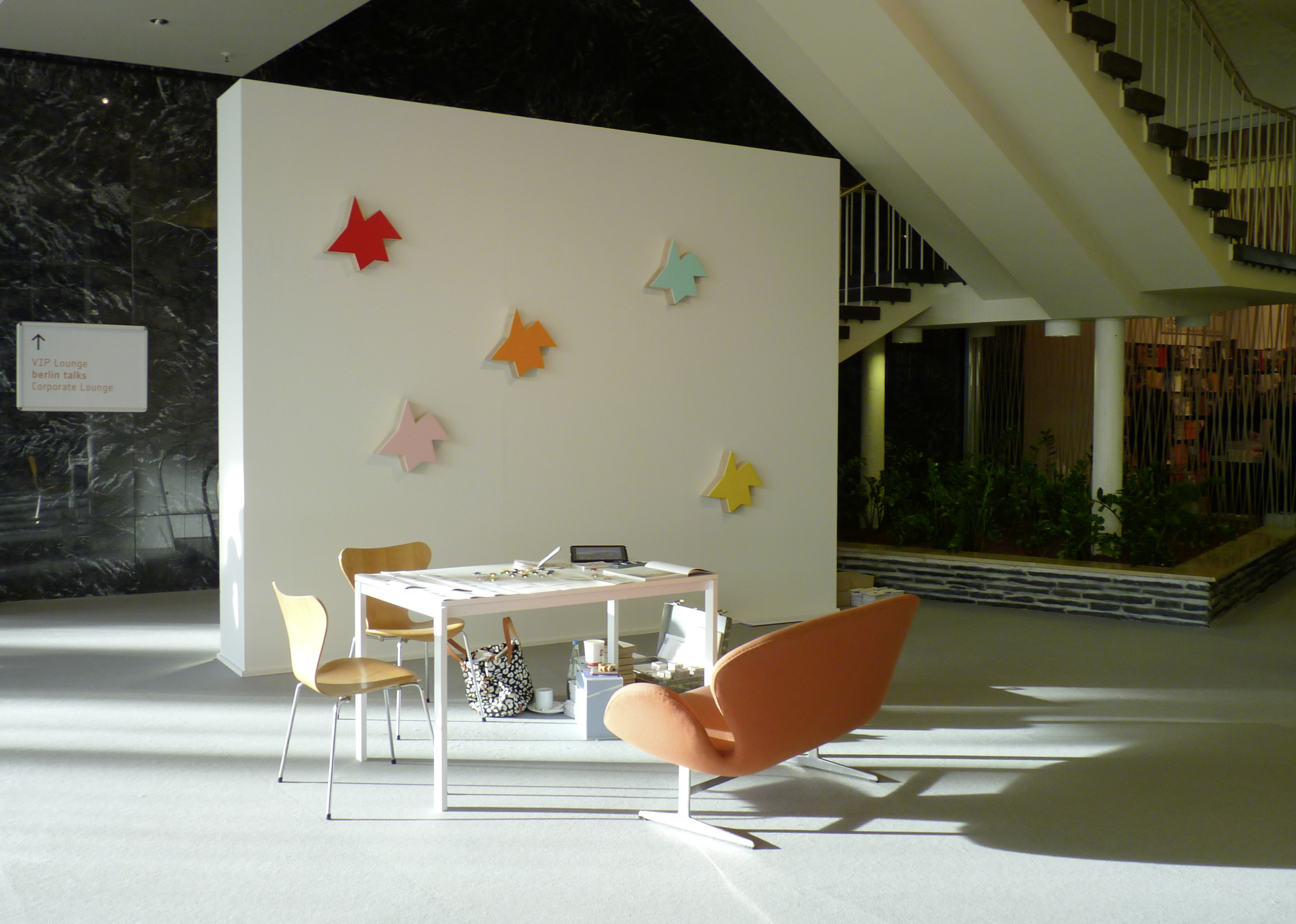
2010 art forum Berlin

- Grace P. Kelly Foundation
- Association for the Fight against Mucoviscidosis,
- Union Chernobyl, Aid for Chernobyl victims in Ukraine
- Fanconi Anemia Project, Heinrich Heine University Düsseldorf.
- Aid for Bulgaria
- Christian Campaign Man and Environment for the Pediatric Clinic Nr. 14 Ochmatdet, Kiew
- Medical child protection day ward at the Protestant Hospital in Düsseldorf
- Arco Iris Foundation for Street Kids in La Paz/Bolivia
- The children´s Right Foundation
- World in Union e. V. Düsseldorf
- Order of the Poor Brothers in Düsseldorf, accommodating homeless children.
- Children's Planet Heidelberg/Germany
- Phönikks, a Foundation for psycho social help, Hamburg/Germany
- Peacevillage Oberhausen/Germany, aid for children in war zones
- Children´s village Baan Gerda for HIV orphans in Nong Muang/ Thailand
- German Economic Foundation for Humanitarian Help/WHH
- From the Hearts to the Hearts – cardiac operations for child victims of Agent Orange in Vietnam
- SonKy Orphanage in Saigon/Vietnam financing the buying of a new house for orphans
- Outback Stiftung, Refugee Home Düsseldorf, language training and social aid for child refugees
- Ullaaitivu Children's Aid, Sri Lanka
- Support of Waaga e.V., medical aid for children from Afghanistan
- Caritas Mettmann, Projects for refugee children
- Königinnen und Helden, neighborhood Integration Projects in Düsseldorf
- Schlaufox, Hamburg, Initiative to support immigrant children Education
- Diakonie Kaiserswerth, language training and integrative Dance-Workshops
- Bunte Schule Dortmund, Waldorf education in social hotspot Dortmund
- IJS e.V, integrative projects for particularly vulnerable refugee children
- Carolinenhof Essen, therapeutic riding for children with special needs
- Support of a school in a social hotspot in Düsseldorf
- Wasserwerk Theater, Strausberg, integrative Theatre projects for children
- UPSALA, the street children's circus in St. Petersburg,
- "Housing First" purchase of a flat for homeless mothers.
