= Akris =

Swiss fashion house

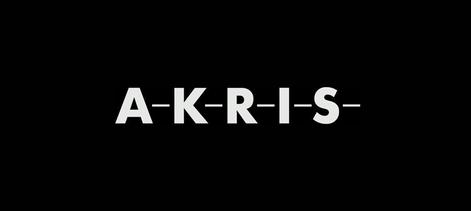
- Type: Private
- Industry: Fashion
- Founded: 1922; 104 years ago in St. Gallen, Switzerland
- Founder: Alice Kriemler-Schoch
- Headquarters: St. Gallen, Switzerland
- Number of locations: Over 500 points of sale worldwide including freestanding boutiques
- Key people: Albert Kriemler, creative director; Peter Kriemler, CEO
- Products: Luxury goods
- Number of employees: 650+
- Website: https://ch.akris.com

Akris (stylized A-K-R-I-S-) is a Swiss luxury fashion house specializing in haute couture and ready-to-wear for women. Founded in 1922, it is currently owned and led in the third generation of the Kriemler family with Albert Kriemler serving as its creative director.

== History ==
Akris was founded in 1922 by Alice Kriemler -Schoch in St. Gallen, Switzerland. The word "Akris" is derived from the letters of Kriemler - Schoch's name. The company initially made simple dotted aprons that Kriemler-Schoch crafted on a single sewing machine. Each piece is still designed in Switzerland and the company still uses the Swiss dot (polka dot) on gift boxes and tissue paper, as well as the Akris Punto logo.

In 1944, Kriemler-Schoch's son Max Kriemler took over the business. The company grew significantly and began producing ready-to-wear clothing. Following the lead of Max Kriemler, Akris also produced clothes for French designers Givenchy and Ted Lapidus.

However, in 1980, Max Kriemler's right-hand man died. Though Max's son Albert Kriemler had planned to travel to Paris to study fashion and apprentice at Givenchy, Max asked Albert to postpone his education for two years to assist in the company's transition. He agreed. Albert could never complete his fashion education; within those two years, he had already begun to take over the company.

In 1987, Peter's expertise in law and economy made him a valuable addition to Akris, where he took charge of the company's financial operations alongside his brother Albert. Peter is now Akris's global CEO, handling management and manufacturing. Peter Kriemler is credited with bringing the Akris collection to Asia with subsidiaries in Japan and Korea, as well as developing the worldwide network of directly operated stores.

Since 2004, the Akris collection has been shown during Paris fashion week - the only Swiss house in the Fédération française de la couture, du Prêt-à-Porter des Couturiers, et des Créateurs de Mode.

== Timeline ==
- 1922 Akris founded by Alice Kriemler-Schoch.
- 1944 Max Kriemler joins the company. Akris is transformed into a ready-to-wear brand.
- 1980 Albert Kriemler joins the company at the age of 19 and takes over creative responsibilities.
- 1985 Development of the current Akris company logo.
- 1987 Peter Kriemler joins the company. Official takeover of management by both brothers in the third generation. While Albert is wholly responsible for creation and the visual impact of the company, Peter controls management and production; while marketing responsibilities are shared.
- 1988 Sales debut of Akris at Bergdorf Goodman in New York.
- 1995 First global advertising campaign with US photographer Steven Klein, New York, and model Stella Tennant.
- 1996 Launch of the Designer Sportswear Collection Akris punto.
- 1996 Opening of the first Akris boutique in Paris and Boston.
- mid-1990s Expansion to the department stores in the US and Canada with partners Neiman Marcus, Saks Fifth Avenue, and Holt Renfrew.
- 1996 Akris becomes a member of the Fédération Française de la Couture, du Prêt-à-Porter des Couturiers et des Créateurs de Mode. It is one of the few non-French couturiers in this organization, such as Dries van Noten, Issey Miyake or Valentino.
- 1999 Opening of the first Akris Boutique in Seoul, Korea.
- 2000 Opening of Namiki Dori, Ginza, the first Akris Boutique in Tokyo, Japan.
- 2001 Opening of the boutique in Paris on Avenue Montaigne.
- 2002 Founding of the subsidiary Akris Japan Ltd. with headquarters in Tokyo.
- 2003 Opening of a boutique on Kohlmarkt in Vienna, Austria and the opening of a boutique on Madison Avenue in New York City.
- 2004 First official press defile in Paris. Opening of a new boutique on Neuer Wall in Hamburg, Germany.
- 2006 Collaboration with the Vienna State Opera Ballet for their New Year Concert.
- 2008 Albert Kriemler is awarded ‘Grand Prix Design’ prize by the globally broadcast Swiss Federal Office of Culture in 2008 and honored with the "Swiss Design Award" for his achievements as the "most important international ambassador for fashion creation in design."
- 2009 Akris acquires German handbag manufacturer Comtesse.
- 2010 Albert Kriemler is named the star honoree for fashion design at the 2010 Fashion Group International Awards in New York.
- 2011 Opening of two new boutiques in Munich, Germany and Ginza, Tokyo, Japan.
- 2011 First virtual trunk show held at Bergdorf Goodman.
- 2012 Akris celebrates its 90th anniversary. Publishing house Assouline releases ‘Akris’ by Valerie Steele, Chief Curator at The Museum at Fashion Institute of Technology (FIT) in New York.
- 2014 Akris celebrates 10 years at Paris Fashion Week. Albert Kriemler creates his Fall/Winter 2014-15 collection in collaboration with German artist Thomas Ruff. The Fall/Winter 2014-15 Punto collection - a collobaration with British artist David Wightman - was also released.
- 2014 Kunsthalle Düsseldorf initiates a defile of the collection within its Thomas Ruff exhibition.
- 2014 H.S.H. Charlene of Monaco chooses three of her dresses designed by Albert Kriemler to be included in the exhibition "Women Fashion Power" at the Design Museum London.
- 2015 Opening of a new boutique in River Oaks District, an upscale shopping and dining center in Houston, TX
- 2015 The collaboration with choreographer John Neumeier continues as Albert Kriemler designs costumes for Josephs Legende and Verklungene Feste at Vienna State Opera.
- 2015 Akris enters the Chinese market and opens a Flagship Store on Times Square in Shanghai.
- 2015 For the first time, Albert Kriemler cooperates with an architect, Sou Fujimoto, from Tokyo, Japan for his Spring/Summer collection 2016 and partially rebuilds Fujimoto's "House N" in the Grand Palais in Paris. In 2013, Fujimoto was the youngest architect ever to create the Summer Pavilion for Serpentine Gallery, London, UK.
- 2016 Wallpaper Magazine London bestows the "Design Award 2016 Best Alliance" to Albert Kriemler for the cooperation with Sou Fujomoto.
- 2016 An Akris LED dress from Albert Kriemler's Thomas Ruff Collection featuring wearable technology is included in the permanent collection of Museum für Angewandte Kunst (MAK) in Vienna, Austria.
- 2016 Akris opens its first boutique in Italy, located at the corner of via della Spiga and via Gesù in Milan.
- 2016 Albert Kriemler is the recipient of the 2016 Couture Council at The Museum of FIT Award for Artistry of Fashion. Among previous recipients were Alber Elbaz, Dries van Noten, Valentino and Karl Lagerfeld.
- 2016 The collaboration of Albert Kriemler with choreographer John Neumeier continues with costumes for the ballet "Turangalîla", based on Olivier Messiaen's famous symphony at Hamburg State Opera. The premiere is staged on July 3, 2016.
- 2016 For the first time, Albert Kriemler stages his défilé at New York Fashion Week in Lever House, an International Style architectural landmark. His spring/summer 2017 collection is the fruit of a collaboration with New York artist Carmen Herrera whom he met for the first time on her 101st birthday.
- 2017 Albert Kriemler collaborates with Canadian Artist Rodney Graham. For his “A Woman in a Coat and with a Bag” fall/winter 2017/18 collection, he is inspired with Graham's lightbox “Coat Puller” and his installation „Der Mantelanzieher“. The new venue for the défilé is Palais de Tokyo in Paris.
- 2017 Akris unveils its new boutique at 45-46 boulevard de la Croisette in Cannes, France, just in time for the 70th edition of the Annual Cannes Film Festival.

== Collections ==
Akris is a collection of pieces, designed in lines, with fabrics, tailoring and colors. Albert Kriemler has gained a following by creating a fashion collection for career-oriented women around the world. Artists and architects have inspired his designs or have collaborated directly with him.

In 1996, Akris introduced a new line called Akris Punto. The Akris Punto collection has an emphasis on "relaxed sportswear". In 2009, Akris expanded its Prêt-a-Porter offering with the introduction of handbags featuring animal-friendly horsehair textile, a woven fabric made from the tail-hair.

In 1996, Akris was admitted to the French Chambre Syndicale, the governing body of the French fashion industry. The company delayed participating in Paris Fashion Week until 2004, when it was able to secure a spot on one of the event's most important days. In the 2000s, the company was one of the world's fastest-growing designer brands, selling at stores such as Bergdorf Goodman and Neiman Marcus, where Akris shares floor space with brands like Bottega Veneta, Fendi and Lanvin. Akris's success is largely due to trunk shows and word of mouth; the company does very little advertising. Unlike other fashion houses, the company does not produce fragrances and does not license its name. Akris have a reputation for working with artists. Two notable examples have been a collaboration with the German photographer Thomas Ruff and separately with the British painter David Wightman.

== Sales and stores ==
Akris is the largest Swiss clothing producer, though it does not disclose sales or profit figures. Its value has been reported as approximately US$500 million; the company has not disputed this figure, but the number may be an overestimate "judging from [Albert] Kriemler's response when that number is tossed out. The brand is sold in more than 300 locations worldwide.

Approximately 40% of Akris sales are in North America. Akris was first sold in the United States in 1988; the brand can now be found in 70 U.S. stores, including over 20 Neiman Marcus locations and 30-some Saks Fifth Avenue locations, where Akris shares floor space with brands like Bottega Veneta, Fendi and Lanvin. Freestanding Akris boutiques are located in Boston, New York City, Atlanta, Palm Beach, Bal Harbor, Chicago, Dallas and Houston. Akris Punto is sold in approximately 100 stores in the United States.

== Celebrities ==
Several female celebrities are known to have worn Akris designs, including Amal Clooney, HSH Charlene, Princess of Monaco, Tina Fey, Susan Sarandon, Doris Yaffe, Shakira, Alicia Keys, Angelina Jolie, Nicole Kidman Diane Sawyer and former Secretary of State Condoleezza Rice.

== Garment production ==
The company's headquarters is located in St. Gallen, Switzerland with 200 employees. The design process begins with the fabric; Kriemler then sketches his designs. Akris fabrics are often custom-produced; sometimes, development of a fabric may take years. Most of the fabrics used in Akris clothing are produced in specialized mills in northern Italy.

Akris clothing is generally produced in ateliers in St. Gallen, Zurich, and Ticino, Switzerland. Kriemler has aimed to continue St. Gallen's textile-based history by hiring local artisans. About half of the company's manufacturing employees (around 280 employees) are highly skilled artisans; two years of training is required for a seamstress to master the hand-finishing of Akris's double-faced cashmere jackets, each of which requires two and a half days to complete.
