= Austrian Film Museum =

The Austrian Film Museum (German: Österreichisches Filmmuseum) is a film archive and museum located in Vienna, Austria. It was founded by Peter Konlechner and Peter Kubelka in 1964 as a non-profit organization.

== History ==
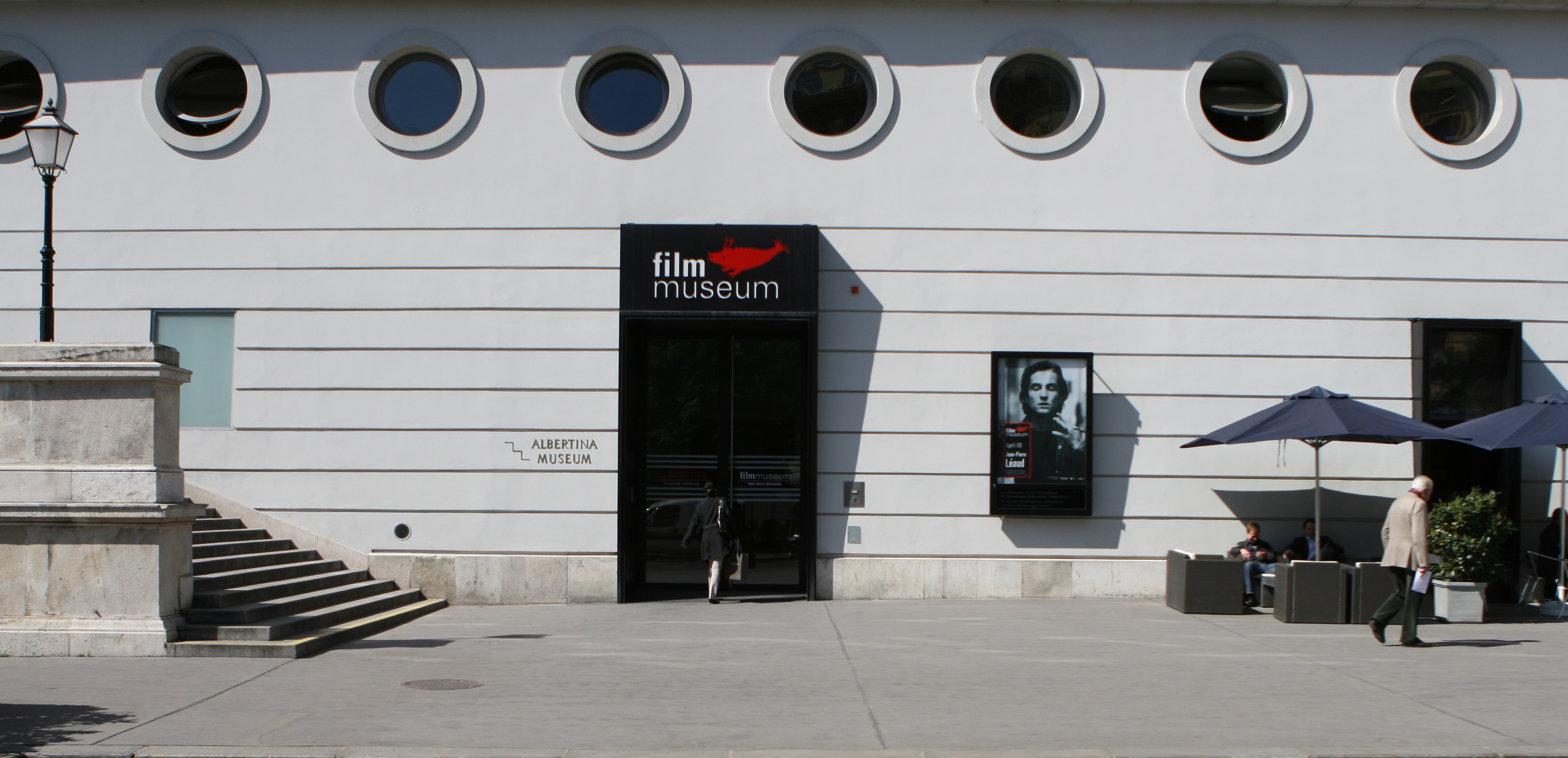
Austrian Film Museum.

In February 1964, independent filmmaker Peter Kubelka and film enthusiast Peter Konlechner founded the Austrian Film Museum. They had met in 1962 at the "Internationale Kurzfilmwoche" (International Short Film Week), which Konlechner organized as part of his student film club Cinestudio at the Technical University of Vienna. The Austrian Film Museum aimed to preserve films and present them to the public, affirming what the founders thought to be the two roles of film: "as the most important form of artistic expression in modernity and as the chief historiographical source of the 20th century." This effort was financially supported through the Austrian government as well as the City of Vienna. Private sponsors alongside the membership and admission fees have kept the establishment functioning. Within a year's time of its inception, the Austrian Film Museum was inducted as a member of the International Federation of Film Archives (FIAF). After changing venues during its first 18 months, the Film Museum found its permanent location for film presentations and office space in Vienna's first district in the Albertina building in the course of 1965. The events of the Filmmuseum were accompanied by great audience interest. Especially the retrospectives, which the Film Museum organized as part of the Viennale since 1966, gave it a unique rank in the German-speaking countries.

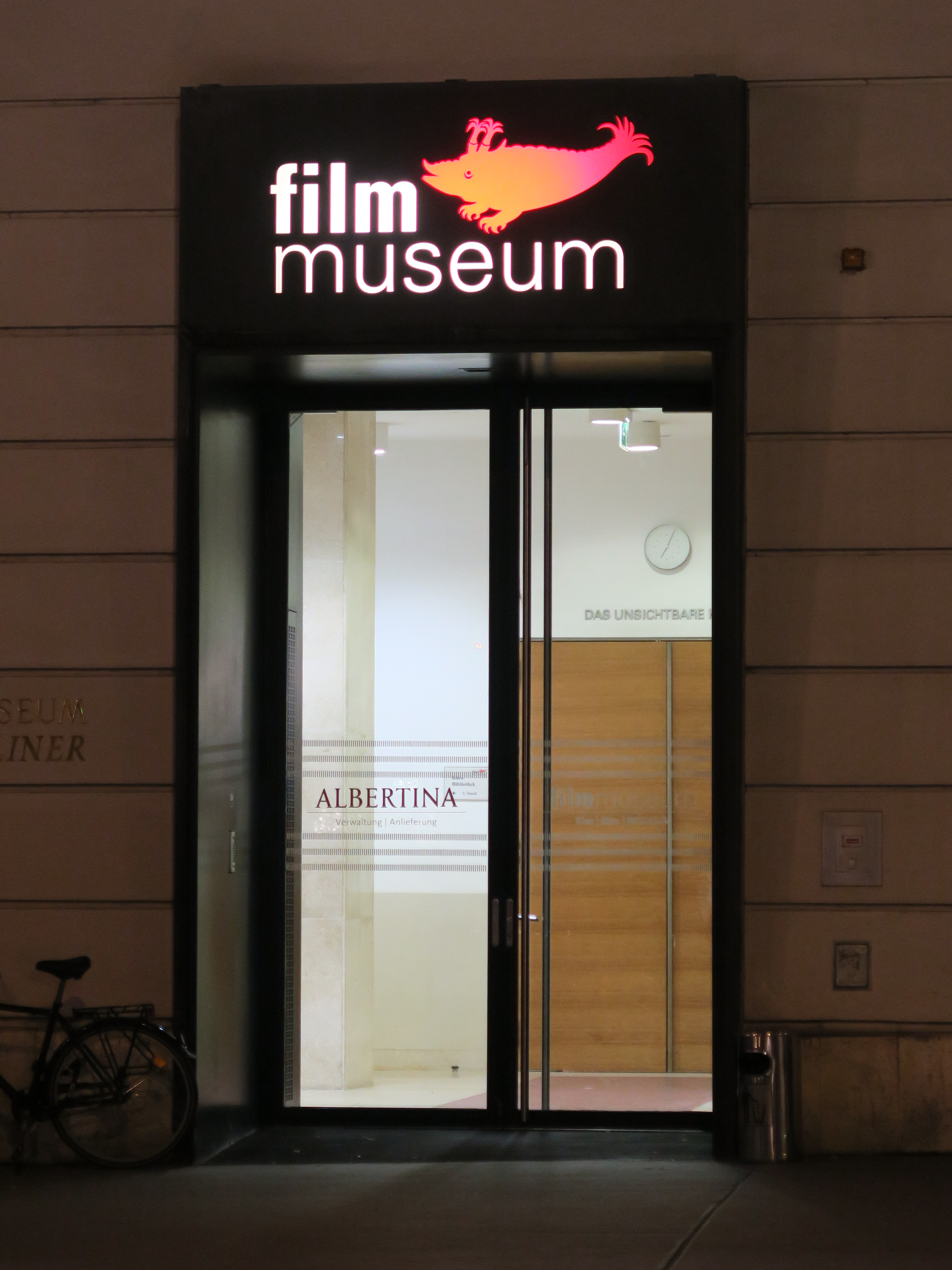
Entrance of the Austrian Film Museum

In 2005, the Austrian government awarded the Film Museum the Honorary Prize at its annual Austrian Museum Awards. In their verdict, the jury emphasized that the Austrian Film Museum ranks among the best in the world in its field.

=== Directors ===
From its inception, Konlechner and Kubleka remained as the co-directors until the end of 2001, when both retired. Curator and author Alexander Horwath was appointed as their successor and took over on January 1, 2002. He maintained the fundamental goals of the museum, expanded the range of programming and the number of screenings, intensified collection and restoration activities, and strengthened the areas of education, research, and publications. In 2014, on the occasion of its 50th anniversary, the Film Museum realized a total of 21 different projects that reflected not only upon the history, the collections, and the founders of the institution, but also on the cultural moment of the museum's "birth", as well as questions of future historiography and the importance of a museum dedicated to cinematographic film.

In November 2016, the Board of the Austrian Film Museum appointed Michael Loebenstein, former Chief Executive of the National Film and Sound Archive of Australia (NFSA), as the new director. Alexander Horwath retired from the role of director, effective October 1, 2017 after 16 years of leadership at the museum.

- 1964 to 2001: Peter Konlechner and Peter Kubelka
- 2002 to September 2017: Alexander Horwath
- From October 2017: Michael Loebenstein

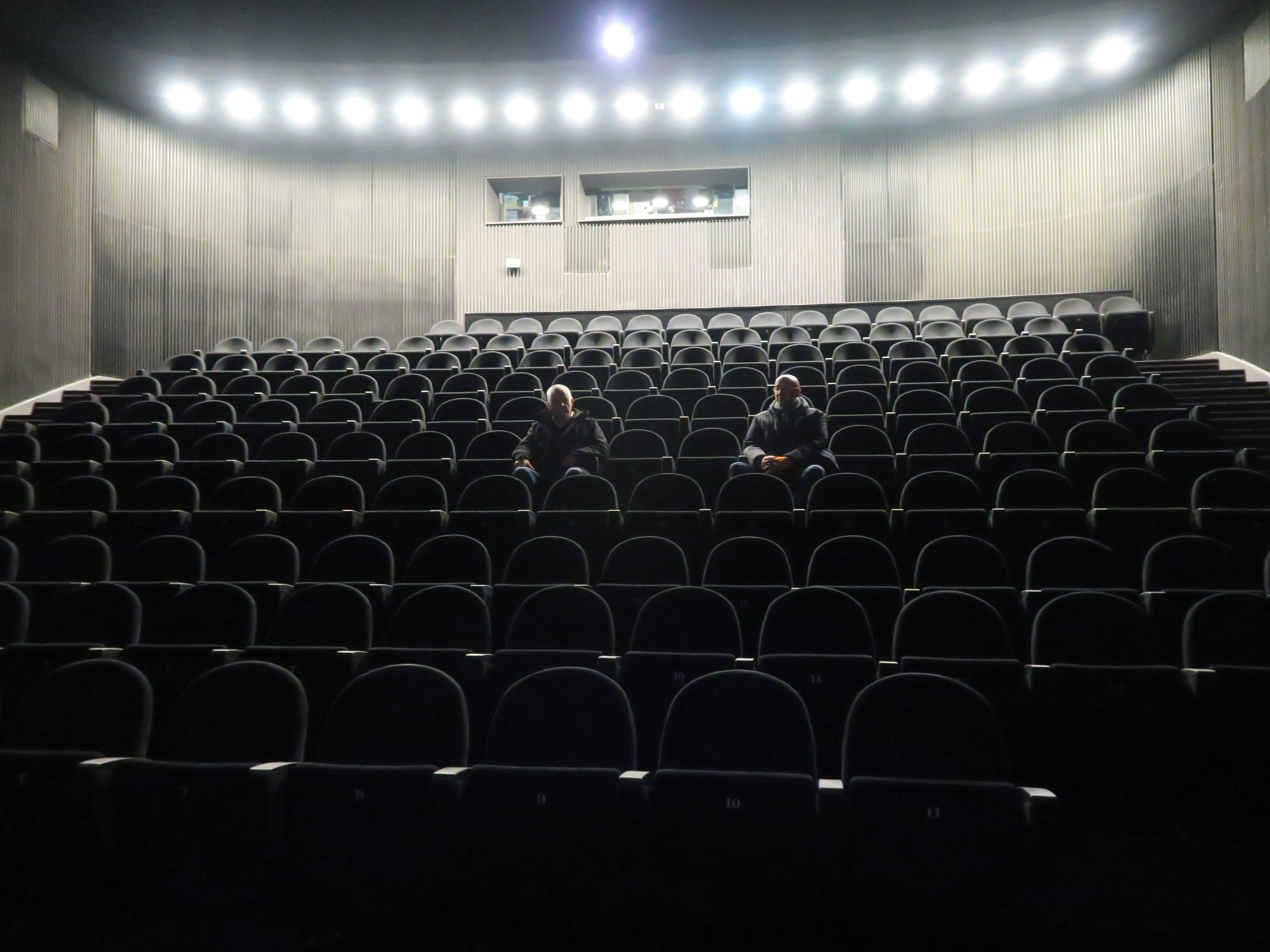
The Invisible Cinema 3

=== The Invisible Cinema ===
The concept of an "Invisible Cinema" first emerged in conversations between Peter Kubelka and architects Johannes Spalt and Friedrich Kurrent around 1958, before the founding of the Austrian Film Museum. The cinema was envisaged as a machine that serves as a relay between director and audience, with an architectural space that is completely focused on the image and sound of the film. In 1989, on the occasion of the 25th anniversary of the Film Museum, the "Invisible Cinema" was opened according to Peter Kubelka's concept: a black-in-black screening room, a "seeing and hearing machine" that strives for the highest possible concentration on the cinematic event itself. Kubelka had already realized his concept of the "Invisible Cinema" at the opening of the Anthology Film Archives in New York in 1970.

In October 2003, in consultation with Peter Kubelka, Friedrich Mascher and Erich Steinmayr realized the "Invisible Cinema 3" at the same location, now significantly renovated and expanded, with new seating and improved possibilities for image and sound reproduction.

=== Zyphius ===
From 1964 to 1984, the Austrian painter and graphic artist Gertie Fröhlich designed over 100 posters for the Austrian Film Museum and was also responsible for choosing the Film Museum's trademark logo: the magical fable creature "Zyphius", which she found amongst renaissance illustrations of mythical animals.

=== Honorary President and Guests of the Film Museum ===
Since 2005, acclaimed filmmaker Martin Scorsese who is also a vocal supporter of film preservation serves as Honorary President of the Austrian Film Museum. In 1995, Scorsese visited the Film Museum on the occasion of a complete retrospective of his work.

Artist VALIE EXPORT was named the first Honorary Member by the Film Museum's Board of Directors in the summer of 2021.

Among the filmmakers who have visited the museum throughout its history are Martin Scorsese, Chantal Akerman, John Alton, Olivier Assayas, James Benning, Busby Berkeley, Bernardo Bertolucci, Stan Brakhage, Luigi Comencini, Luc & Jean-Pierre Dardenne, Catherine Deneuve, Claire Denis, Lav Diaz, Jean Eustache, Valie Export, Harun Farocki, Rainer Werner Fassbinder, Federico Fellini, Michael Haneke, Werner Herzog, Philip Seymour Hoffman, Danièle Huillet, Chuck Jones, Elia Kazan, Alexander Kluge, Kurt Kren, Fritz Lang, Claude Lanzmann, Richard Leacock, Sergio Leone, Richard Linklater, Dušan Makavejev, Gregory J. Markopoulos, Groucho Marx, Jonas Mekas, Jeanne Moreau, Marcel Ophüls, Arthur Penn, Christian Petzold, Yvonne Rainer, Eric Rohmer, Jean Rouch, Paul Schrader, Werner Schroeter, Ulrich Seidl, Don Siegel, Michael Snow, Alberto Sordi, Jean-Marie Straub, Tsai Ming-liang, Agnès Varda, Paul Verhoeven, Luchino Visconti, Viva, Kôji Wakamatsu, Apichatpong Weerasethakul and Frederick Wiseman.

== Activities ==
The activities of the institution are oriented to the basic tasks of a museum: collection and preservation; research and education; exhibition.

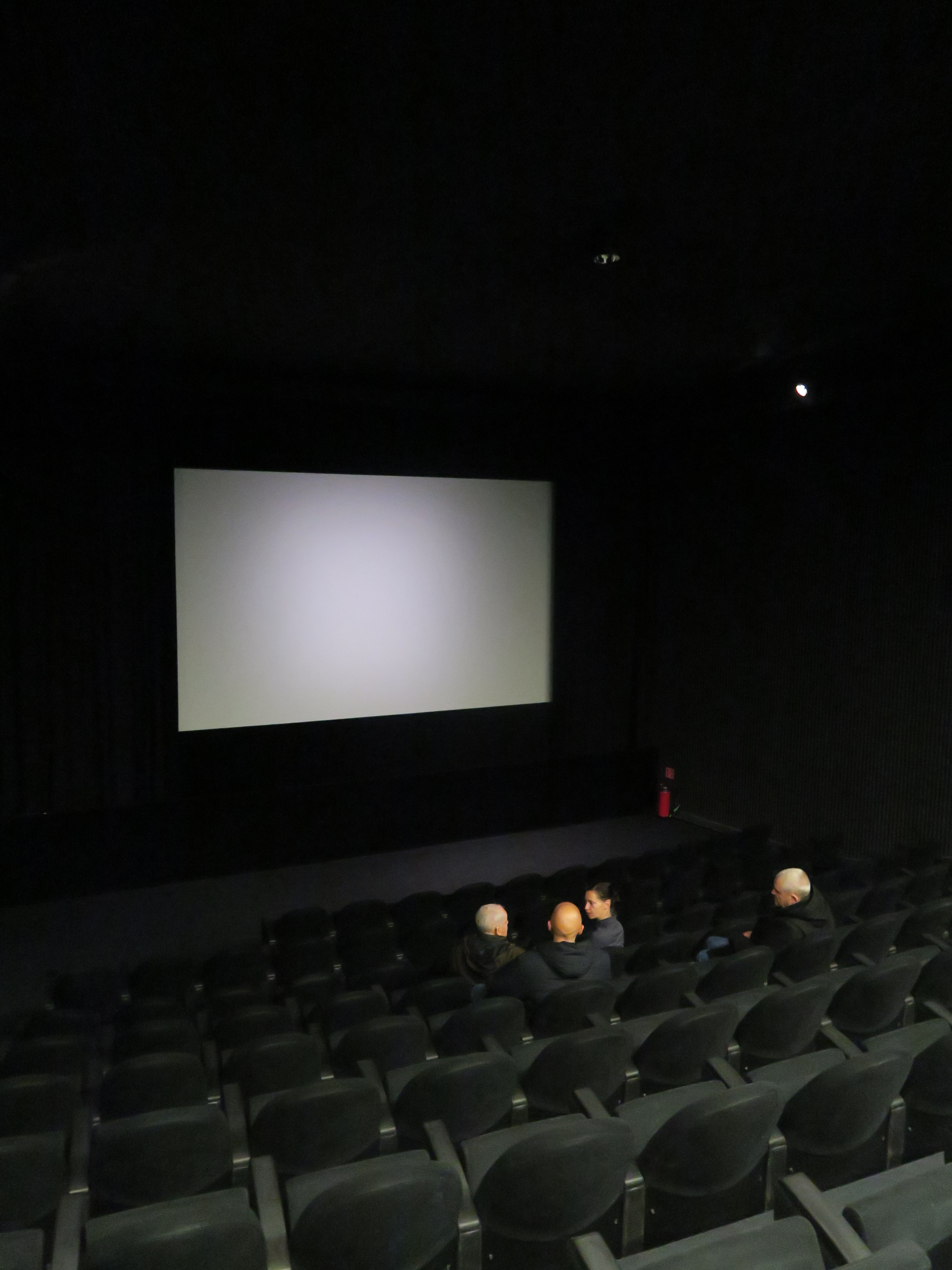
The Invisible Cinema 3

=== Exhibition ===
The exhibitions of the Film Museum take place on the screen. The Film Museum runs an exhibition program with around 700 cinema screenings per year. The series "What Is Film" (since 1996), "The Utopia of Film" (between 2005 and 2017) and "Collection on Screen" (since 2021) present essential examples of the medium of film in the sense of a revolving "permanent exhibition". Film presentation without nostalgic trivialization, in original language, without musical accompaniment and without distorting screening modalities was set as a standard: "Films are to be collected, preserved and presented with the same care and respect which are applied to paintings and the plastic arts. Films deserve to be placed on an equal footing with works of art. Films are specific products of collective memory. They must be preserved and shown in the same fashion as historical source materials and documents: undistorted, unabridged, uncommented and in their original language."

=== Collection and Preservation ===
The collection, preservation and restoration of films and film-related artifacts is one of the Film Museum's chief responsibilities. The collection comprises approximately 31,000 films from 1893 to the present and all genres. It focusses on several specific collection areas which were established since the founding of the museum. In addition to the classics of film history, there is a focus on international and Austrian avant-garde film, Soviet revolutionary cinema, and the German-language film exile. Special attention is also given to film documents on contemporary history and "ephemeral" forms such as amateur film.

The Film Museum takes active measures to safeguard and give access to its collections. This happens through digitization, restoration, and analogue duplication. The Film Museum has been active in this field since the early 1970s. One of the first major restoration projects was the reconstruction of Dziga Vertov's early sound film Enthusiasm - The Donbass Symphony (1930) by Peter Kubelka and Edith Schlemmer. Since 2008, the Film Museum has been using digital restoration techniques in addition to traditional photochemical reproduction methods.

In addition to its film collection, the Film Museum houses a specialized public film library, collections of film stills, posters and paper documents, as well as numerous special collections (including those on filmmakers such as Dziga Vertov and Michael Haneke). Several stocks of material have been made accessible to scholars and students online.

With over 28,200 books and more than 400 journal titles, the library of the Film Museum is the largest film library in Austria. It has been located at Hanuschgasse 3 since 2018; previously it was housed in the Albertina building. The catalog is available online. The private library of the Austrian emigrant Amos Vogel (Amos Vogel Library) with about 8,000 books, journals and juvenile writings is part of the library and is open to the public since the end of 2019.

=== Research and Education ===
The basis of the Film Museum's education policy has always been the "screened presence" of film: the cinema event. Since the 1960s, the Film Museum has offered contextual material on the subjects of film history and film aesthetic in diverse ways (publications, lectures, discussions with artists, etc.). Since 2002, these activities have gradually been increased. The Film Museum is a research and educational facility and supports research projects in academic and non-academic fields, cultivating collaborations with international research institutions and universities.

Since 2002 the Film Museum has been inviting children and teenagers between the ages of 5 and 18 to visit its screenings, lectures, close-up-programs and laboratories in the framework of the Cineschool series. The Film Museum is also offering a project for schools called Focus on Film. The program provides teachers with guidance by film experts, both Film Museum employees and external film educators, for the duration of one semester. The film seminar Summer School which takes place once a year, is a four-day education program for teachers.

The Austrian Film Museum is a partner of the CINEMINI EUROPE project, which is dedicated to the development of film education for ages 3 to 6.

Working in cooperation with Austria's universities, the Film Museum regularly hosts and organizes academic courses and seminars.

The Film Museum is a partner or initiator of scientific research projects. For example, starting in 2004, the Dziga Vertov Collection was scientifically processed and put online, followed by the research project "Digital Formalism" (2007-2010) with the Institute for Theater, Film and Media Studies at the University of Vienna and the Interactive Media Systems Group at the Vienna University of Technology. The KUR_Program for the Conservation and Restoration of Mobile Cultural Assets enabled the Deutsche Kinemathek and the Austrian Film Museum to secure the outtakes of Friedrich Wilhelm Murnau's Tabu (1931) through recopying, to edit them scientifically, and to publish them in digital form. "Ephemeral Films: National Socialism in Austria" (in partnership with the United States Holocaust Memorial Museum, Washington) was one of the many projects that the Film Museum is carrying out together with the Ludwig Boltzmann Institute for History and Society in Vienna. From 2016 to 2019, the Film Museum was involved in the European research and dissemination project "I-Media Cities," funded by the EU under the Horizon 2020 program for research and innovation. Since 2019, the Austrian Film Museum has been coordinating the research project "Visual History of the Holocaust: Rethinking Curation in the Digital Age" together with the Ludwig Boltzmann Institute for Digital History.

=== Publications ===
The Film Museum has been publishing books on film history since the 1960s. In a second series, books and booklets on the work of Jean Eustache, Yasujiro Ozu, Humphrey Jennings, and Robert Gardner appeared in the 1980s and early '90s. In 2003, a new book series called KINO was inaugurated jointly with Zsolnay-Verlag, with volumes on popular film genres (including. "Singen und Tanzen im Film," "Western," "Film und Biografie," Klaus Kreimeier's "Kulturgeschichte des frühen Kinos," among others) and important film artists (Edgar G. Ulmer, Peter Lorre, Orson Welles, Laurel & Hardy, Buster Keaton).

Since 2005, the other series, jointly edited with SYNEMA – Society for Film and Media under the imprint FilmmuseumSynemaPublikationen, offers richly illustrated books on the work of independent filmmakers (Claire Denis, Peter Tscherkassky, John Cook, James Benning, Michael Pilz, Apichatpong Weerasethakul, Gustav Deutsch, Romuald Karmakar, Olivier Assayas, Joe Dante, Dominik Graf, Hou Hsiao-hsien, Jean-Marie Straub & Danièle Huillet, Ruth Beckermann) and on topics of film history (Dziga Vertov, Jean Epstein's film theory, Josef von Sternberg's last silent film, female film comedians c. 1910) and theory ("Film Curatorship," "Was ist Film," "Screen Dynamics," "Archäologie des Amateurfilms," texts by and about Amos Vogel, Alain Bergala's "Cinema Hypothesis," Siegfried Mattl's Writings on Film and History, Guy Debord). A three-volume publication on the history and collections of the Film Museum was published in 2014. The series, which comprises around 35 volumes (as of 2022), is in German, or English, or bilingual.

As a founding member of the Edition Filmmuseum, the Austrian Film Museum has been producing DVDs of rare films (by Erich von Stroheim, Lev Kulešov, Josef von Sternberg, Dziga Vertov, Straub/Huillet, John Cook, Michael Pilz, James Benning, Apichatpong Weerasethakul, Lav Diaz) since 2005. Edition Filmmuseum is a joint project of film archives and cultural institutions in the german-speaking part of Europe.

Since 2012 the Film Museum has made some sections of its film collection accessible online. These include (in the form of a searchable database) the holdings of the newsreel "Österreich in Bild und Ton" (Austria in Sound and Vision; 1935-1937) and all surviving issues of "Kinonedelja" Dziga Vertov's first newsreel and his "Kino-Pravda".

== See also ==
- List of film archives
- Cinema of Austria

== Bibliography ==
Fünfzig Jahre Österreichisches Filmmuseum 1964 | 2014. Eszter Kondor, Alexander Horwath, Paolo Caneppele. Wien: Synema. 2014. ISBN 978-3-901644-53-5 OCLC 880134680

Was ist Film. Peter Kubelkas zyklisches Programm im Österreichischen Filmmuseum. Stefan Grissemann, Alexander Horwath, Regina Schlagnitweit, Harry Tomicek, Thomas Korschil. Wien: Synema. 2010. ISBN 978-3-901644-36-8 OCLC 729911341
