= Urban Art (group) =

Polish artists

Marek Pisarsky
- Born: 1956 (age 69–70); Ruda Śląska, Poland
- Known for: Urban Art
- Style: Pixel painting
- Website: urbanart-berlin.de

Anne Peschken
- Born: 1966 (age 59–60); Montreal, Quebec, Canada
- Known for: Urban Art
- Style: Pixel painting
- Website: urbanart-berlin.de

Urban Art (formed in 1988) is an artistic duo active in Germany and Poland.

Its founders, Marek Pisarsky (born in 1956 in Ruda Śląska, Poland) and Anne Peschken (born in 1966 in Montreal, Quebec, Canada) have collaborated on various artistic and curatorial projects.

== Work ==
- Dialog Loci, 2004
- Dialog of Things, 2001

== Bibliography ==
- Official website
- Bucharest-buchawork
