= Helmut Federle =

Swiss painter

- Occupation: Painter

Helmut Federle is a Swiss painter.

== Life ==
Federle spent his childhood and youth in St. Margrethen close to St. Gallen in Switzerland. In 1959, he created his first small paintings with his initials HF as a motif.

From 1964, Federle studied at the School of Applied Art in Basel. In 1969 and 1971, he received a federal scholarship. In the following year, Federle travelled to Tunisia and the United States, where he studied for example the works of Mark Rothko and Agnes Martin. Together with his fellow artist and friend Martin Disler he exhibited in 1976 in the Kunstmuseum der Stadt Solothurn. Motifs at this time were mountains reduced to small triangles.

In 1979, Federle exhibited large-scaled canvases with geometric forms in the Kunsthalle Basel. The exhibition was mostly misunderstood. In 1979 and 1980, Federle lived in New York City where he was featured in the C-Space together with John M. Armleder, Olivier Mosset and Christoph Gossweiler. In 1981, the artist book New Suicide Grafic, Faces and other Pieces and in 1984 the artist book Arbeit der Neuen Ordnung (NSG II) were published.

From 1983 to 1984, Federle lived in Zürich and held a professorship in Reykjavík. Later he moved to Vienna where he started to work with Galerie Nächst St. Stephan. In the following years, Federle was widely featured in various museum shows. In 1997, he represented Switzerland at the XLVII. Biennale in Venice. From 1999 until 2007 he held a professorship at the Kunstakademie Düsseldorf and, in 2008, he received the Prix Aurelie Nemours., in 2016 the Ricola Prize.

'Scratching Away at the Surface' was the title of a recent exhibition in New York.

Federle lives and works in Vienna and in Camaiore, Italy.

== Solo exhibitions ==
- 1979 Kunsthalle Basel, Switzerland (cat.)
- 1985 Haags Gemeentemuseum, Den Haag, Netherlands (cat.)
- 1985 Städtische Galerie Regensburg, Regensburg, Germany;
- 1985 Kunstmuseum Basel, Switzerland;
- 1989 Museum of Grenoble, France (cat.)
- 1989 Kunstverein Hamburg, Germany (cat.)
- 1989 Kunsthalle Bielefeld, Bielefeld, Germany;
- 1989 Museum Haus Lange, Krefeld, Germany;
- 1991 Wiener Secession, Vienna, Austria (cat.)
- 1992 Moderna Museet Stockholm, Stockholm, Sweden (cat.)
- 1992 Kunsthalle Zürich, Switzerland (cat.)
- 1993 Museum Fridericianum, Kassel, Germany (cat.)
- 1993 Museum Folkwang, Essen, Germany (cat.)
- 1995 Kunstmuseum Bonn, Germany (cat.)
- 1995 Galerie nationale du Jeu de Paume, Paris, France (cat.)
- 1997 Venice Biennale, Swiss Pavilion, Venice, Italy (cat.)
- 1998 IVAM Centre Julio González, Valencia, Spain (cat.)
- 1999 Kunsthaus Bregenz, Austria (cat.)
- 2002 Musée des Beaux-Arts de Nantes, France (cat.)
- 2004 Nietzsche-Haus, Sils-Maria, Switzerland (cat.)
- 2005 Rudolf Steiner Archiv / Haus Duldeck, Dornach, Switzerland (cat.)
- 2009 Peter Blum Gallery, New York, NY
- 2010 Galerie Nächst St. Stephan, Vienna, Austria (cat.)
- 2012 Kunstmuseum Luzern, Lucerne, Switzerland (cat.)
- 2013-2014 Peter Blum Gallery, New York, NY (cat.)
- 2017 Calouste Gulbenkian Museum, Lisbon, Portugal
- 2019 Kunstmuseum Basel, Switzerland

== Public collections ==
- Albertina, Vienna, Austria
- Albright-Knox Art Gallery, Buffalo, NY
- Carnegie Museum of Art, Pittsburgh, PA
- Espace de l'art concret, Mouans-Sartoux, France
- Haags Gemeentemuseum, Den Haag, The Netherlands
- Kunsthalle Nürnberg, Germany
- Kunstmuseum Basel, Switzerland
- Kunstmuseum Bonn, Germany
- Kunstmuseum Chur, Switzerland
- Kunstmuseum Luzern, Switzerland
- Kunstmuseum St. Gallen, Switzerland
- Kunsthaus Zürich, Switzerland
- Louisiana Museum of Modern Art, Humlebaek, Denmark
- Moderna Museet, Stockholm, Sweden
- Musée d'Art Moderne, St. Etienne, France
- Museum of Grenoble, Grenoble, France
- Musée des Beaux-Arts de Nantes, France
- Musée National d'Art Moderne, Centre Pompidou, Paris, France
- Museo Nacional Centro de Arte Reina Sofia, Madrid, Spain
- Museum moderner Kunst Stiftung Ludwig, Vienna, Austria
- Museum of Modern Art, New York City, NY
- National Gallery of Australia, Canberra, Australia
- Tate Modern, London, Great Britain
- Zentrum für Kunst und Medientechnologie, Karlsruhe, Germany

== Bibliography ==
- Bilder 1977–1978. Kunsthalle Basel, Switzerland, 1979
- New Suicide Grafic, Faces and other pieces, Zürich, Switzerland, 1981.
- Arbeit der Neuen Ordnung (NSG II), Dudweiler, Germany, 1983.
- Zeichnungen/Drawings 1975-1984. Zürich, Switzerland, 1984
- Bilder, Zeichnungen. Basel, Switzerland, 1985
- Jedes Zeichen ein Zeichen für andere Zeichen – Zur Ästhetik von Helmut Federle. Klagenfurt, Austria, 1986
- 5 + 1 New York, USA, 1990
- Helmut Federle. Wiener Secession, Vienna, Austria 1991
- Helmut Federle, XLVII Biennale Venedig. Baden, Switzerland, 1997
- Helmut Federle. Cologne, Germany 1999
- Helmut Federle. Nantes/Arles, France 2002
- Helmut Federle – Zeichnungen 1975-1997 aus Schweizer Museumsbesitz im Rudolf Steiner Archiv, Dornach. Basel, Switzerland, 2005
- Helmut Federle Vienna, Austria 2010. Catalogue (in German and English) with an essay by Roman Kurzmeyer (Self-Assertion and Abstract Form)
