= Annie Cattrell =

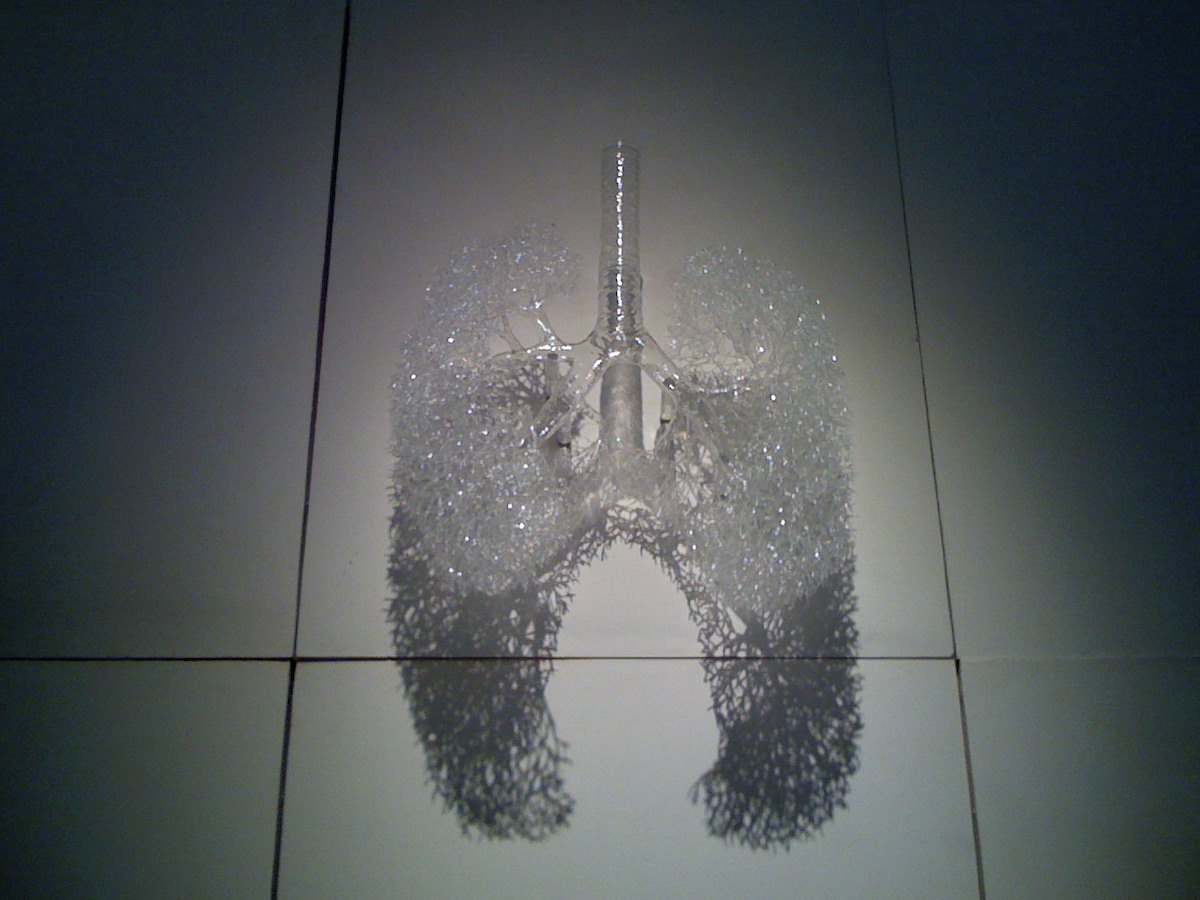
Annie Cattrell, Capacity (2000)

Annie Cattrell FRSS is a Glasgow-born sculptor and artist. Cattrell often works with specialists in neuroscience, meteorology, engineering, psychiatry, and the history of science. Evidence of this approach can be found in Capacity, a work created while she studied corrosion casts, a technique used to show the structure of lungs, in Guy's Hospital Museum of Anatomy. It has been shown both as an art object and to educate; for example, as a part of "Out of the Ordinary", an exhibition held at the Victoria & Albert Museum, and as an example of a fractal shape in nature, at a Royal Institution Christmas lecture. Cattrell is an Associate Lecturer on the MA Ceramics & Glass programme at the Royal College of Art in London.

== Public art ==
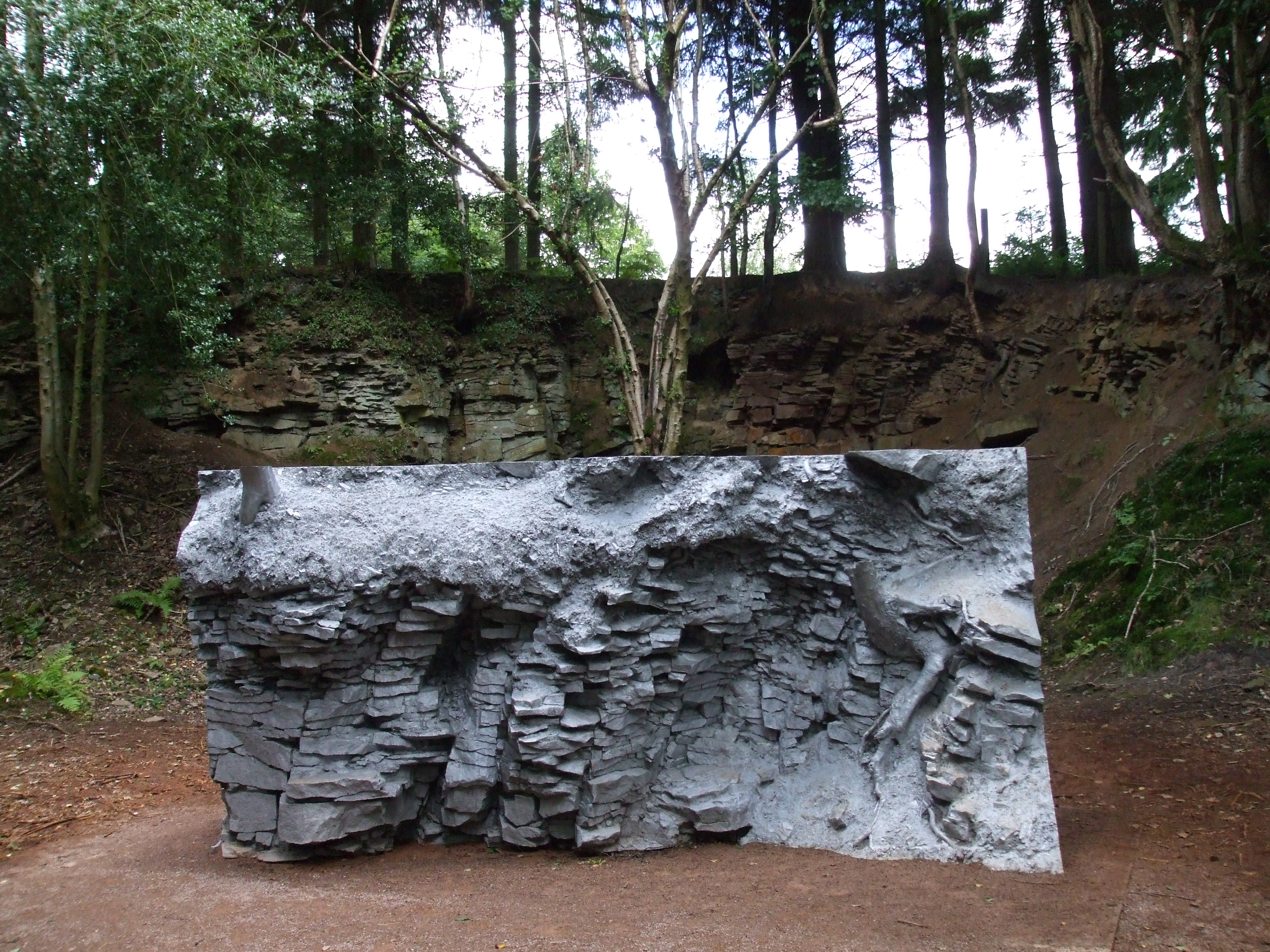
Echo, in the Forest of Dean

=== Echo ===
Echo is part of the Forest of Dean Sculpture Trail installed in 2008, commissioned in memory of Jeremy Rees, a founder of the trail.

=== Seer ===
Seer stands in Huntly Street in Inverness, two resin blocks cast from rock faces on either side of the Great Glen Fault.

=== Transformation ===
Transformation hangs on two sides of the New Science Centre building in Anglia Ruskin University.

=== Resounding ===
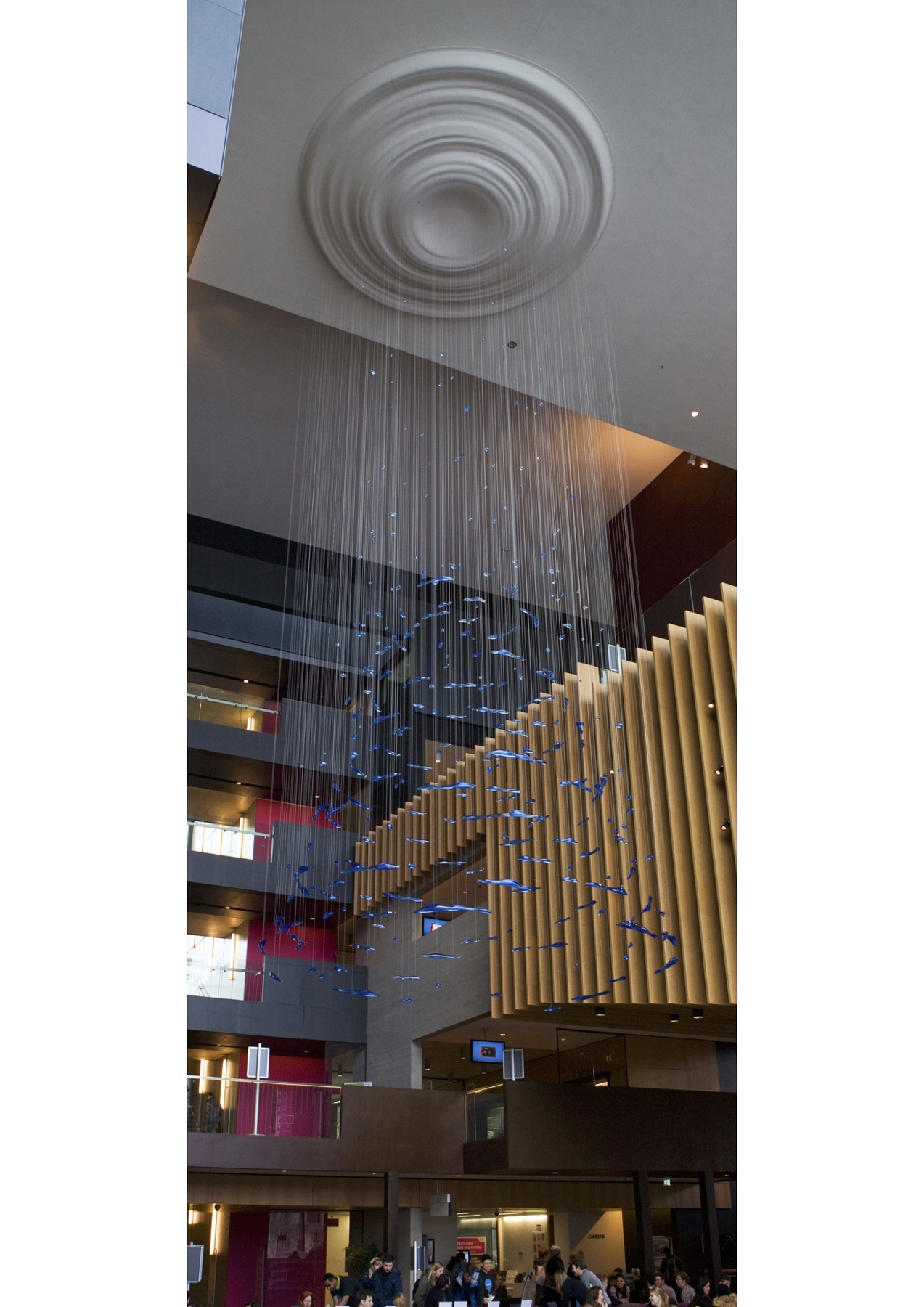

Resounding is made of hundreds of cast resin droplets, suspended over a public area in Oxford Brookes University.

== Solo exhibitions ==
- From Within (2006);
- Fathom (2010);
- Transformation (2017).
