= Alistair Gentry =

London-based performer, writer, producer, and activist

Alistair Gentry (1973-2026) was a London-based performer, writer, producer and activist who frequently addressed issues of disability and accessibility in his work. Commissioned by the Open Data Institute and Tate Liverpool, Gentry's playful and provocative work engaged audiences in discussions of visibility and invisibility, with a focus on education around issues of digital privacy, the climate crisis, LGBTQ+ equality, and income disparity, particularly for self-taught artists. Gentry frequently wrote art reviews and opinion pieces including a series on mental health for A-N magazine and a regular column in Sluice magazine. His short stories, novels, and sci-fi writings were both self-published and found in small presses such as Pulp Books.

== Significant works ==
Gentry co-directed Hypnomart (2001) with Joe Magee; it was an animate! commission funded by Arts Council England and Channel 4.

In 2005 Gentry was commissioned by Radiator Festival For New Technology Art in Nottingham to deliver a series of nightly live-streamed performances in which they played an astronaut journeying to Mars, sharing information from memory about space exploration and the history of human's ambition to colonise new lands (titled Nowhere Plains).

In 2018 Gentry began a series of performances as a character called DoxBox trustbot which interviewed participants about the apps on their smartphones and questioned their awareness of the data that the service providers held on them through usage of these services. DoxBox trustbot, described as a digital puppet or tech drag unit, addressed digital trustworthiness in a comedic and personal manner at London Data Week and The Open Data Institute summit as well as Furtherfield Future Fair. Originally developed as part of an R&D project funded by Innovate UK, the final performance of what was called the 'fake fake AI' was in 2023, prior to the widespread use of chatbots and AI assistants.

In 2023 Gentry was commissioned by The Photographers Gallery London for the Screen Walks series, offering a 'sleazy' tour of Soho and Fitzrovia as part of Gentry's long-standing artistic practice of making up tourist attractions to draw attention to other histories of people and place. In this walk Gentry revealed the hidden locations of corporate tech companies.
