= Imi Knoebel =

German artist

- Born: Klaus Wolf Knoebel; 31 December 1940 (age 85); Dessau, Germany
- Occupation: German artist

Imi Knoebel (/i:mi: kno:ʊbəl/) (born Klaus Wolf Knoebel; 31 December 1940) is a German artist. Knoebel is known for his minimalist, abstract painting and sculpture. The "Messerschnitt" or "knife cuts," is a recurring technique he employs, along with his regular use of the primary colors, red, yellow and blue. Knoebel lives and works in Düsseldorf.

== Early life and career ==
Knoebel was born in Dessau, Germany, in 1940. From 1962 to 1964, he studied at the Darmstadt "Werkkunstschule", in a course based on the ideas of the pre-Bauhaus course taught by Johannes Itten and László Moholy-Nagy. From 1964 to 1971, he studied under Joseph Beuys at the Kunstakademie Düsseldorf with fellow students Blinky Palermo (with whom he shared a studio and a love), Jörg Immendorff, Ivo Ringe and Katharina Sieverding.

== Work ==
Knoebel's work explored the relationship between space, picture support, and color. The style and formal concerns of his painting and sculpture have drawn comparisons with the high modernist principles of both Kazimir Malevich and the Bauhaus

Between 1966 and 1969, Knoebel worked on a series of "Linienbildern", or line paintings, encompassing 90 panels Another series of 250,000 "Linienbilder" drawings were done on DIN A4 sheets in the years between 1969 and 1973/75. In 1968 Knoebel created his first major work, an installation with a variety of geometrical objects called Raum 19, named after classroom No. 19, which Beuys had given to his students at the academy. Raum 19 comprises seventy-seven components made from wood and Masonite, including painting stretchers, both assembled and in pieces; large constructions of stretchers with untreated Masonite attached as picture planes; and larger cubic volumes and curved blocks that resemble sections of an arched window or door frame.

In 1992, Knoebel created a second version of “Raum 19” for the Hessisches Landesmuseum Darmstadt (Hessian State Museum Darmstadt) in close proximity to Joseph Beuys' “Block Beuys.” In 1968, Knoebel also used photography as an artistic medium.

Beginning in 1968, Knoebel was one of the first Beuys students to use photography as an independent artistic medium. For his Innenprojektionen (Interior Projections; 1968–1970) black-and-white photographs, he started using empty slide projections, creating empty squares of light, projected on a wall or in a darkened, closed-off room. This later evolved to his placing slides covered in copy ink with precisely carved vertical and horizontal lines into the projector and then cast throughout the room. Projecting these lines at various angles throughout a darkened space, at windows, corners, wall fittings and architectural irregularities, offered limitless possibilities for the artist. Knoebel documented these light projections with his camera and displayed the variations in large grids, often with as many as 80 photographs comprising a single work. Knoebel's 1968 Projektion 1, is a series of luminous, disorienting black-and-white photographs of light projections that bring to mind the architectural slicings that Gordon Matta-Clark was conducting at that time. Projection X (1970–71) and Projektion X Remake (2005), two versions of the same video concept, are his only videotapes based on these outdoor projections. During a nocturnal drive through the sleeping city of Darmstadt, a large, luminous X-shaped beam of light was projected from a vehicle onto the walls of buildings.

The collection of the Hessisches Landesmuseum Darmstadt (Hessian State Museum Darmstadt) holds extensive series of photographs, slides, and the video Projection X by Knoebel.

From the mid-1970s on, Knoebel then turned towards a gestural use of color on layered plywood boards or metal plates. From 1975 to date, Knoebel has been working on overlapping coloured rectangles called "Mennigebilder" ("Red Lead Pictures"), named after an anti-corrosion paint used in steel construction by the name of Mennige Paint, which the artist has used in these works. Whereas in his early years his palette was reduced to white, black, and brown, since 1977 he has been producing works with more color. His painting has since been characterized by a gesturally expressive application of colour on panels of layered plywood and metal placed in specific spatial relation. In the 1980s, Knoebel continued his associative loading of geometricizing picture elements and started to focus on the portrait. The arrangement of three, in colour nuanced vertical rectangulars next to and between two horizontal rectangulars is Knoebel's formal solution for depicting the notion ‘portrait’.

Knoebel made a series of 24 colorful monochromes in homage to his friend Blinky Palermo after Palermo's death in 1977. The monumental series, acquired by Dia Art Foundation in the 1970s, was meticulously restored by the artist, who installed the work at Dia:Beacon in May 2008, marking its first-ever exhibition in North America. In 1997, the German Bundestag commissioned Knoebel to create the four-part installation Rot Gelb Weiß Blau 1-4 for one of its office buildings. In June 2011, Knoebel's six stained-glass panes within the apse of the Notre-Dame de Reims Cathedral were unveiled alongside the stained-glass works of Marc Chagall completed in 1974.

=== Kinderstern ===
In 1988, Knoebel created the work Kinderstern, a Social Sculpture realizing the extended notion of art, formulated in 1967 by Joseph Beuys, his Professor at the Kunstakademie Düsseldorf, by which art also ought to change society. Since 1988, Kinderstern (Children Star) stands for the Children's rights and is the only artwork worldwide where proceeds go 100% to children in need.

=== Reims Cathedral ===
More than a century after being severely damaged by German bombing raids, Knoebel designed three new stained glass windows for the Reims Cathedral. Knoebel refused payment for his participation in the project. The creation of the colored, patterned windows, which cost €900,000, was financed by the German Foreign Ministry. They were officially presented on May 12, 2015, during a ceremony attended by the Foreign Ministers Frank-Walter Steinmeier of Germany and Laurent Fabius of France.

== Exhibitions ==
Knoebel's first exhibition, IMI + IMI, with Imi Giese, a fellow student of Beuys's, was held in Copenhagen in 1968. Since that time, he has exhibited his works in documentas 5 (1972), 6 (1977), 7 (1982), and 8 (1987), and at Sonsbeek (1971). In 1996 the Haus der Kunst, Munich, staged a large retrospective of his works which travelled throughout Europe, including such venues as the Stedelijk Museum, Amsterdam, and Institut Valencià d'Art Modern, Centre Julio González, Valencia. Knoebel had a major retrospective in summer 2009 at the Hamburger Bahnhof and the Neue Nationalgalerie in Berlin; the Neue Nationalgalerie showed an arrangement of monumental key works relating to the upper hall of the famous Mies van der Rohe building, as well as gestural painting in various shades of white, which used the glass panes surrounding the upper storey of the building.

== Collections ==
Knoebel's works are held worldwide in numerous public collections, including Dia:Beacon in Beacon, New York, The Museum of Modern Art in New York City, the Fonds Regional d'Art Contemporain (FRAC) in France, the Kunstmuseum St. Gallen in Switzerland, Essl Museum Klosterneuburg in Austria, Albertina in Vienna, Berardo Collection Museum Lisbon in Portugal, National Museum of Contemporary Art Korea, Kunstsammlung Nordrhein-Westfalen in Germany, Gemeentemuseum Den Haag in Netherland and Malmö Konsthall in Sweden. Since its first purchase in 1984, the Deutsche Bank Collection has acquired more than 1,000 works on paper by Knoebel. The artist is represented by Mary Boone in New York, Thaddaeus Ropac in Paris, de:Galerie nächst St. Stephan Rosemarie Schwarzwälder in Vienna, Bärbel Grässlin in Frankfurt, Gallery Fahnemann in Berlin and Helga de Alvear in Madrid.

== Art market ==
In 2016, Knoebel's Grace Kelly (1989) was sold for a record £365,000 at Christie's in London.
