= Monique Péan =

American jewelry designer (born 1981)

- Born: 1981 (age 44–45); Washington, D.C., United States
- Education: University of Pennsylvania
- Known for: Art and design
- Website: moniquepean.com

Monique Péan (born c. 1981) is an American artist whose practice is focused on fine jewelry, sculpture, painting and furniture. Her studio is based in New York City. Her work explores themes of space, temporality, identity, and origins, and makes use of materials such as fossils, meteorites, and sustainable recycled metals.

== Early life and education ==
Péan was born in Washington, D.C. and raised in Great Falls, Virginia. Her Haitian-born father was a senior economist at the World Bank and a consultant at the United Nations Development Programme. Péan visited 20 countries as a child with her father, including Egypt, Israel, Turkey and Bulgaria. Péan's mother, a painter of impressionistic landscapes and portraits in oil, is Jewish of Russian and Polish descent. Péan attended an international school in Washington, and graduated from the University of Pennsylvania in 2003.

== Work ==
After college, Péan worked as an analyst on the fixed income desk at Goldman Sachs in New York City. She left the finance industry in 2005, following the death of her younger sister in a car accident. She had started to make jewelry as a therapeutic hobby. and decided to bring together her love of travel and art by visiting artisans around the world, learning about their cultures and art, and employing them to craft materials. She visited the Arctic Circle with a friend who worked with the Alaska Native Arts Foundation and during that visit was shown ancient walrus tusk fossils that prompted her to explore older physical objects.

In 2006, she launched her first fine jewelry series with designs focused on using sustainably sourced materials, including fossils and ethically sourced diamonds. After learning about the amount of waste produced in gold mining, Péan decided to use only recycled gold and platinum. She was soon recognized by outlets like The New York Times and The Wall Street Journal for her sculptural work and unique materials, including fossilized walrus ivory, fossilized dinosaur bone, and meteorite specimens

In 2016, Péan was invited to design the fine jewelry pieces in the film La La Land, working closely with director Damien Chazelle, Mary Zophres, and actress Emma Stone. Her jewelry has been worn by Michelle Obama, Natalie Portman, Gwyneth Paltrow, Kerry Washington, Naomi Watts, Lupita Nyong'o, Mahershala Ali, and John Legend. In January 2021, First Lady Jill Biden wore custom earrings designed by Péan to the 46th Presidential inauguration ceremony.

== Paintings ==
Péan began painting in 2012, using her pieces from her Sut’ana series as inspiration. Péan used magnified photographs of the fossils in her pieces on large canvases, focused on their patterns when observed up close. She painted over the photographs to create an effect that would "mimic the fossils’ reflective and translucent textures". As of 2021, Péan was painting using pigments that she had created from fossilized dinosaur bone fragments, ground into powder and mixed with water and gum arabic.

== Sculpture ==
Péan began to focus more on sculpture starting in 2019, when she began creating box-shaped "vessels" fabricated from steel and bronze that hold—and in an artistic sense, "interact" with—pieces of meteorite. Within the piece Sikhote-Alin Vessel (2019), there is a specimen of the Sikhote-Alin meteorite, which landed in southeastern Russia in 1947. The meteorite fragments are intended to be taken out of the boxes and held by viewers. She created the sculptures in collaboration with a metal fabricator who had worked with Donald Judd and Sol LeWitt. In addition to her sculptural work and painting, Péan has designed furniture and "functional objects" such as textiles. Similarly to her jewelry, she works with traditional artisans to create objects using her designs.

In 2021, Péan was one of 50 contemporary artists whose works were included in the Objects: USA 2020 exhibition at R & Company in New York, co-curated by Glenn Adamson. Three of her sculptures including Sikhote-Alin Vessel, were included in the exhibition, which revisited the 1969 Objects USA exhibition of the best crafts of the century. Péan spoke about the exhibition and her work at the Museum of Arts and Design as part of the museum's "In the MAD Loupe" series of talks on contemporary artists. Her work has also been featured at art and design fairs and galleries including Art Basel Miami, PAD Art + Design, and Object & Thing.

Péan was featured in the book Coveted, written by Melanie Grant, a writer at The Economist. The book examines the "artistic impact of great design" via stories and interviews of fine jewelers.

== Themes and process ==
A recurring theme in Péan's work is the idea of "deep time". She uses fossils and meteorites that can be billions of years old, intending to transport the viewer or wearer back in time. Her use of ancient natural materials is meant to "collapse time and space". Péan has stated that her work “strive[s] to create a balance between organic textures and geometric structure".

Another key theme in her work is inspiration from travel, and reflecting different landscapes, architecture, art and cultural diversity.

When acquiring materials for her works, Péan contacts scientists and researchers in order to gain in-depth information about the fossils and meteorites, as well as ensuring that they are sustainably sourced. The craftsmanship used to produce her work is carried out by artisans around the world, and Péan works with indigenous peoples who have generational knowledge of the materials. For example, she has worked with Inupiaq Alaskans to etch fossilized walrus ivory, Rapa Nui of Easter Island to sculpt obsidian, and Mayan descended artisans to carve Guatemalan jade.

== Other work and roles ==
Péan is a member of the women's council of Dia Art Foundation. She is a founder of Management Leadership Tomorrow's Career Advancement Program, an initiative to help minority professionals advance their careers through mentorship and professional networking.

In 2016, she designed a t-shirt for Hillary Clinton's presidential campaign as part of the Made for History initiative, which invited designers to create t-shirt designs supporting Clinton. In 2020, she designed a face mask embroidered with the word "Unity" as part of the "Believe in Better" range of fashion merchandise created for the Joe Biden and Kamala Harris U.S. presidential campaign in 2020.

== Philanthropy ==
Péan has supported Charity:Water, a non-profit that focuses on improving access to clean drinking water in the developing world, since the charity was founded. She provides a percentage of her studio's profits to the charity to support their operations. Since 2006, Péan has funded the construction of clean water and sanitation projects in countries including Malawi, Nepal, and Haiti. In 2015, Péan created a capsule collection of fine jewelry, honoring artist Walter De Maria and inspired by his 1979 piece The Broken Kilometer. The proceeds from the sale of the collection went to support the Dia Art Foundation and its programming.

== Awards ==
In 2009, Péan was named as one of two runners-up for the CFDA/Vogue Fashion Fund Award, receiving a $50,000 award and a business mentorship. She was also the recipient of the Ecco Domani Fashion Foundation Award. In 2011, Péan was the recipient of the CFDA/Vogue Fashion Fund and Tiffany & Co. development grant. She was the recipient of Wallpaper's Best Jewelry Design Award in 2015.
