= Dia Art Foundation =

US nonprofit arts foundation

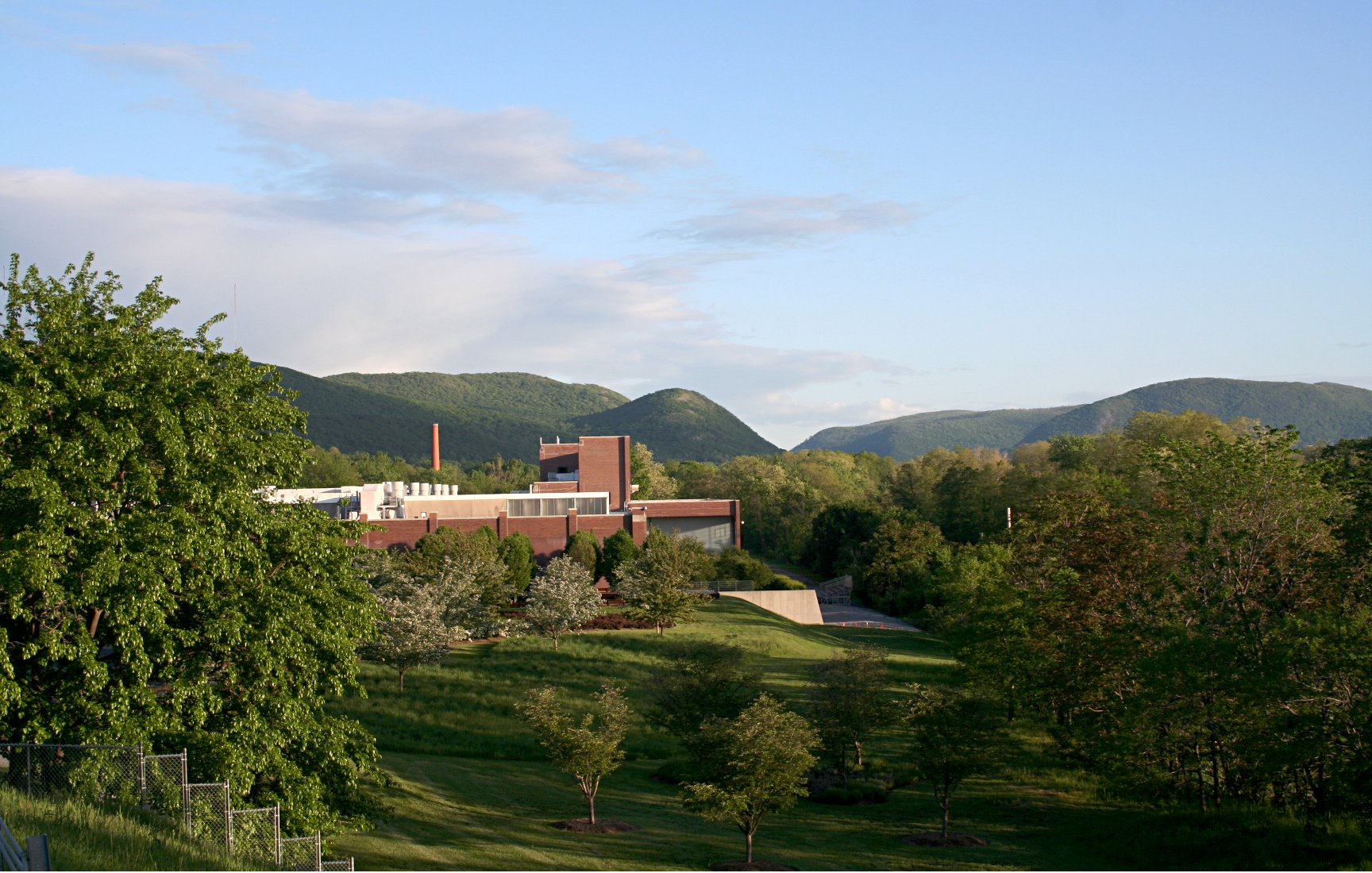
- Dia Beacon, Riggio Galleries in Beacon, New York, on the Hudson River
- Founded: 1974; 52 years ago
- Founders: Philippa de Menil; Heiner Friedrich; Helen Winkler
- Purpose: Contemporary art
- Coordinates: 40°44′52″N 74°00′25″W
- Key people: Jessica Morgan (director)
- Endowment: $57 million (as of 2007)
- Website: Dia Art Foundation website

Dia Art Foundation (/diə/ DEE-ə) is a nonprofit organization that initiates, supports, presents, and preserves art projects. It was established in 1974 by Philippa de Menil, the daughter of Houston arts patron Dominique de Menil and an heiress to the Schlumberger oil exploration fortune; art dealer Heiner Friedrich, Philippa's husband; and Helen Winkler, a Houston art historian. Dia provides support to projects "whose nature or scale would preclude other funding sources."

Dia holds a major collection of work by artists of the 1960s and 1970s, on view at Dia Beacon that opened in the Hudson Valley in 2003. Dia also presents exhibitions and programs at Dia Chelsea in New York City, located at 535, 541 and 545 West 22nd Street. In addition to its exhibition spaces at Dia Beacon and Dia Chelsea, Dia maintains and operates a constellation of commissions, long-term installations, and site-specific projects, notably focused on land art, nationally and internationally. Dia's permanent collection holdings include artworks by artists who came to prominence during the 1960s and 1970s, including Joseph Beuys, Dan Flavin, Donald Judd, Agnes Martin, and Andy Warhol. The art of this period represented a radical departure in artistic practice and is often large in scale; it is occasionally ephemeral or site-specific.

Currently, Dia commissions, supports, and presents site-specific installations and long-term exhibitions of work by these artists, as well as those of younger generations.

== History ==
=== Early years ===
Heiner Friedrich was a German art dealer with galleries in Munich and Cologne which showed artists such as Andy Warhol, Cy Twombly, Donald Judd, and Dan Flavin. In 1973, Friedrich moved his galleries to New York City at 141 Wooster Street, now the site of The New York Earth Room. That year Friedrich traveled to Houston to visit the Rothko Chapel where he met Dominique de Menil's assistant Helen Winkler and was reintroduced to her daughter Philippa de Menil. Friedrich and Philippa de Menil would later both get divorces so they could marry each other in a 1979 Sufi ceremony and get a marriage license in 1982.

Friedrich, Winkler, and Philippa de Menil founded Dia in 1974. The goal of the organization was to fund artists creating work on scales or with underlying natures that the funding sources of the time could not support. Friedrich's plan was to create a funding system similar to patronage systems from the Renaissance. Robert Whitman, a performance artist funded by Dia, stated that Friedrich "wanted to make a Sistine Chapel, create a Shakespeare." Friedrich himself stated that, "The 20th century clearly stands beside the Renaissance as one of the most powerfully visual ages. We have artists of the magnitude of Titian, be it Andy Warhol; of the magnitude of Michelangelo, be it Dan Flavin; of the magnitude of Donatello, be it Walter De Maria. This is why we did Dia." Friedrich had the vision and art contacts, while Philippa de Menil was heir to the Schlumberger oil fortune and had the money to support the idea. Philippa de Menil's husband, Francesco Pellizzi, was on the original six-member board, and Dominique and Christophe de Menil were on the advisory council.

Dia got its name from the Greek word "dia" which means "conduit." Friedrich explained the name choice with "'Dia' was chosen as a transitory term for an institution that would not be eternal but would make possible the presence of artworks on an extended, long-term basis" Dia first patronized a group of artists that included Donald Judd, Dan Flavin, John Chamberlain, Walter De Maria, La Monte Young, and Marian Zazeela. These artists received stipends, studios, and archivists in anticipation of one-man museums that Dia planned for several of them. Dia stayed away from press and was not well known through the '70s. The goal was for Dia to not have an identity and be a true "conduit" for the art works it was funding without adding themselves to it. An article by Phoebe Hoban in New York Magazine in 1985 called the foundation a "closely guarded secret" during this time period, references people calling it "the art Mafia," and notes that the organization didn't even have a letterhead.

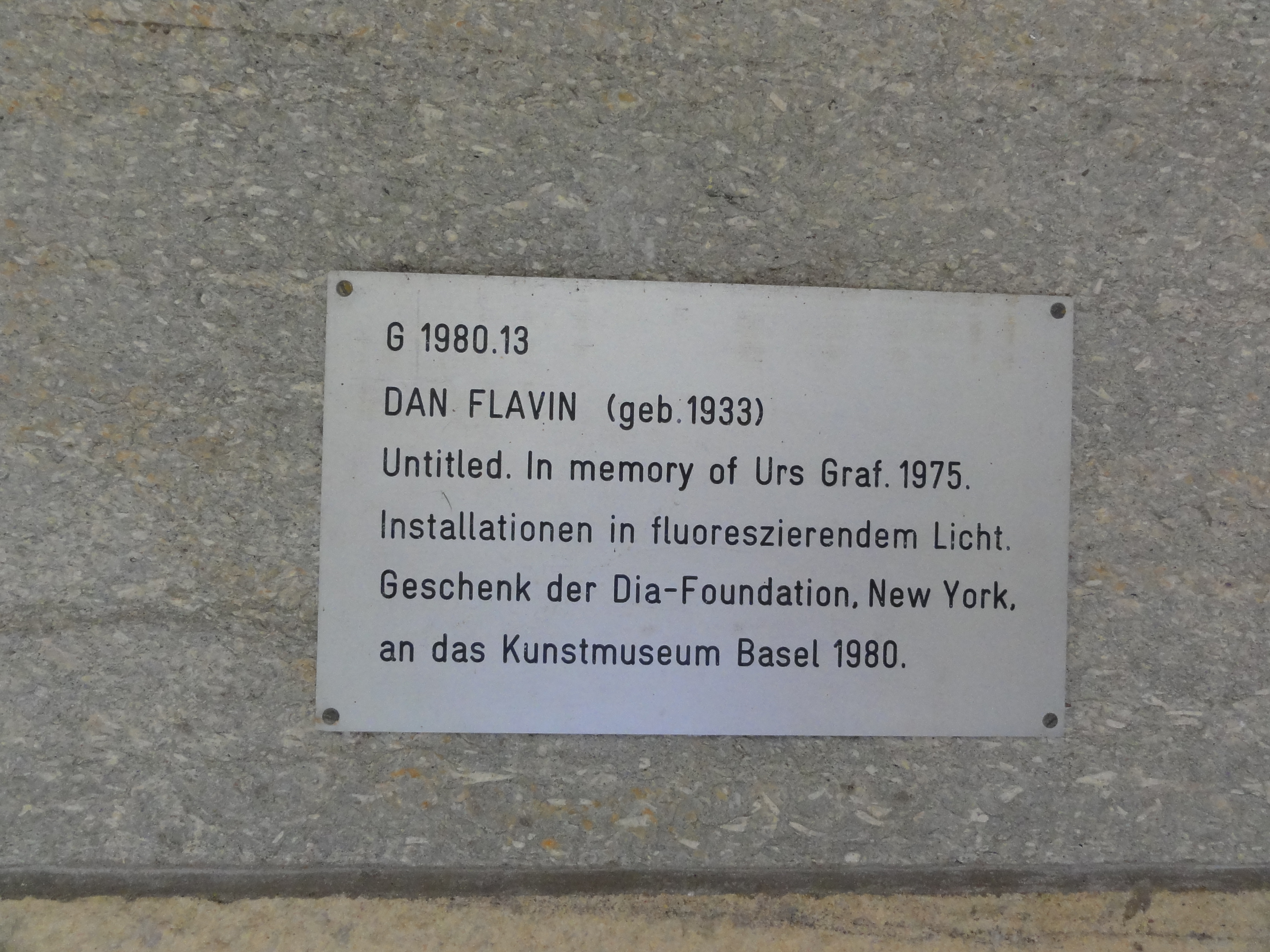
plaque for Untitled (In memory of Urs Graf), Dia's first public art installation.

Following a series of performance works and temporary exhibitions at Friedrich's gallery in SoHo, including the "Dream Festival" by La Monte Young and Marian Zazeela, Dia installed its first public artwork in 1975 at the Kunstmuseum Basel, in Basel, Switzerland. This artwork, Untitled (In memory of Urs Graf) by Dan Flavin, was installed in the museum's courtyard and consists of fluorescent tubes in varying colors outlining the space. This was followed in 1976 by a retrospective of six theater pieces by Robert Whitman

In 1977 Friedrich's gallery space was transformed into a permanent exhibition of Walter De Maria's The New York Earth Room and Dia's offices were moved to 107 Franklin Street. Dia planned the opening of three other works in 1977: Walter De Maria's The Vertical Earth Kilometer in Kassel Germany, and Lightning Field in New Mexico, as well as a permanent, multicolored, light installation by Dan Flavin stretching across three platforms at Grand Central Terminal in New York. The same year Dia purchased a volcanic crater in Arizona for James Turrell for his Roden Crater project (and later gave him approximately six million dollars to move the project forward).In 1979 the second location of Friedrich's gallery space, 393 West Broadway, was also given over to Walter De Maria for a permanent art installation, The Broken Kilometer.

Dia continued purchasing buildings to create one-man museums, and in some cases living quartets, for their roster of artists. Starting in 1979, the foundation hired architect Richard Gluckman and started looking for reinforced-concrete structures suitable for showing art. With his help 1979 saw the purchase and renovation of multiple sites including a former firehouse and church for the Dan Flavin Art Institute, Dick's Castle in Garrison, New York (which was purchased for $1 million but later discovered was too expensive to renovate), and the Mercantile Exchange at 6 Harrison Street for Young and Zazeela to create Dream House (Dia spent approximately $4 million on buying and renovating the building and gave Young and Zazeela a budget of $500,000 a year for upkeep and artmaking.) This buying spree continued into the 1980s with the purchase of a building on West 19th street in 1980 for Robert Whitman spending $495,000 on the building and handing out $250,000 a year to Whitman for upkeep and art making, and the 1981 purchase of a former bank building in Winchendon, Massachusetts for Fred Sandback to create a one-man museum in. The year 1980 also saw Dia open the Masjid al-Farah (later Dergah al-Farah), a Sufi lodge replete with Flavin light works and living quarters for Sheikh Muzaffer Ozak al-Jerrahi, in a former firehouse at 155 Mercer Street. The opening of the Sufi lodge was a reflection of de Menil's recent conversion to the path of Sufi Islam and later ascension as spiritual guide to the Nur Ashki Jerrahi Order of New York City. Over this same time Friedrich and de Menil purchased the shuttered Fort D.A. Russell in Marfa, Texas, renamed it "The Art Museum of the Pecos," and planned to house works for multiple artists Dia funded. The 350 acres, now known as the Chinati Foundation, was conceived by Donald Judd who was given $17,500 a month as a salary and installation payment for the museum.

In the first ten years, Dia was spending up to $5 million a year on less than twelve artists, funding art commissions and living expenses for individual artists between $2,500 and $17,500 a month. The foundation spent over $30 million in less than 10 years amassing over 900 works and a small real estate empire. By 1981 Dia owned about $14 million worth of artwork and $15 million in real estate. Over 1980 and 1981 it spent about $19 million supporting artists and their work. These first years of Dia are marked with management issues, including paying taxes on properties that could be tax exempt and other extravagant spending. Philippa de Menil summed up how fast Dia did so much with "The reason we accomplished so much in terms of projects is that we just forged ahead and didn't worry about overspending."

=== Financial issues and restructuring ===
Between 1980 and 1982, the Schlumberger oil stock cratered, going from about $87 a share to about $30. This drastic cut to de Menil's fortune forced Dia to begin tightening the purse strings with its artists. Artists were sent details about how to spin their projects off into independent foundations. In 1983, Donald Judd was informed that his brainchild in Marfa was being delayed, and he was advised to turn it into an independent foundation. Things got so bad financially for Dia in 1983 they were forced to take out a $3.87 million loan from Citibank using de Menil's Schlumberger stock as collateral. This prompted The New York state attorney general to begin an investigation into the foundation's practices and Judd threatened to sue Dia for breach of contract

1985 saw a shake up in Dia's board due to the financial issues and Judd's threatened lawsuit. Heiner Friedrich left the board and Philippa de Menil's financial support ended and her money was placed into a trust, although she remained a board member. Philippa de Menil's mother, Dominique de Menil, stepped in, and installed Ashton Hawkins, an executive vice president at the Metropolitan Museum, as Dia's chairman. Along with Hawkins, the new board members included Lois de Menil, John C. Evans, future United States Supreme Court justice Stephen Breyer, Margaret Douglas-Hamilton, and Herbert Brownell. Lois de Menil summed up the financial distress Dia was in with "We were absolutely appalled at the state of acute financial distress...There was a $5-million Citibank debt to pay, projected costs of $5-million, no operating budget, and no visible income."

The night before the new board was set to meet, Sheikh Muzaffer Ozak al-Jerrahi of the Sufi lodge Dia funded, passed away in Istanbul, Turkey. Philippa de Menil (now Fariha Fatima al-Jerrahi) ominously reflected on the passing of her spiritual guide saying, "His death seemed to herald many new changes."

The new board began slashing at Dia contracts and real estate to get the budget under control with projects being dropped and dismantled at a fast rate. The mosque was removed from 155 Mercer Street to 245 West Broadway. La Monte Young and Marian Zazeela had to leave the Harrison Street building, which was then sold for $5.5 million. Artists were outraged and threatened to sue. La Monte Young said, "The new board treated us like criminals, like terrorists... they took ten years of our lives away." and Dan Flavin remarked about the de Menil's that, "It doesn't matter who gets hurt in order to hold up the family reputation."

An auction of works from Dia's holdings was held in 1985 at Sotheby's including pieces by Cy Twombly, Andy Warhol, and Donald Judd and raised approximately $1.3 million causing an outcry from those artists still connected to Dia. The foundation restructured and refocused on a new purpose as an institution. A fundraising campaign began to start an endowment that would fund a drastically reduced operating budget, approximately $800,000 a year. Dia began showing works from its collection in public for the first time, starting with a show of Cy Twombly paintings. The financial difficulties during the 1980s reduced Dia's annual expenditures from $5 million in 1984 to 1.2 million in 1987. By the end of 1987, real-estate and art sales had brought in about $17 million to pay the debt and start an endowment. The foundation was renamed the Dia Center for the Arts and a programme of poetry readings, performances, lectures and publications was begun.

=== Collecting new works and renovating spaces ===
In 2015, Jessica Morgan joined Dia as the new director. While Dia holds works by under 50 artists, Morgan focused new collecting on works by women and international artists to diversify the largely white and male collection. This push culminated in the acquisition of Sun Tunnels by Nancy Holt. Morgan also ended the drive to build a new building in Chelsea and instead focused on joining three buildings the Foundation already owns and using raised funds to support the endowment. A $78 million capital campaign was announced in June 2018 and the target was raised to $90 million in May 2019. When asked about this sudden change from building a new building to a much smaller scope of construction in an interview in Artnet Morgan explained, "We're very different from the Guggenheim or MoMA, where we think of specific buildings as being the landmark institutions. Dia has always followed a different route, which was finding spaces where the artists could share their vision with us." The New Dia Chelsea is scheduled to reopen in the fall of 2020 followed by updates, renovations, and expansions at other spaces under the Dia purview. A new gallery will open in SoHo in a retail space Dia has rented out for 10 years, 11,000 square feet (1,000 square metres) of gallery space at Dia Beacon will be opened, and the climate control systems for The New York Earth Room and The Broken Kilometer will be overhauled so the works can remain open all year. These physical updates to buildings Dia owns are planned to use less than 25% of the funds raised from the capital campaign.

== Locations and sites ==
There are twelve locations and sites which the Dia Art Foundation considers part of its constellation of art museums and long-term installations. Dia breaks its holdings into two distinct categories: locations and sites. "Locations" include museum structures that contain galleries of smaller works either on permanent or temporary display, while "sites" are long-term art installations placed outside of the gallery context that have been either commissioned or acquired by Dia.

=== Locations ===
==== Dia Beacon, Riggio Galleries ====
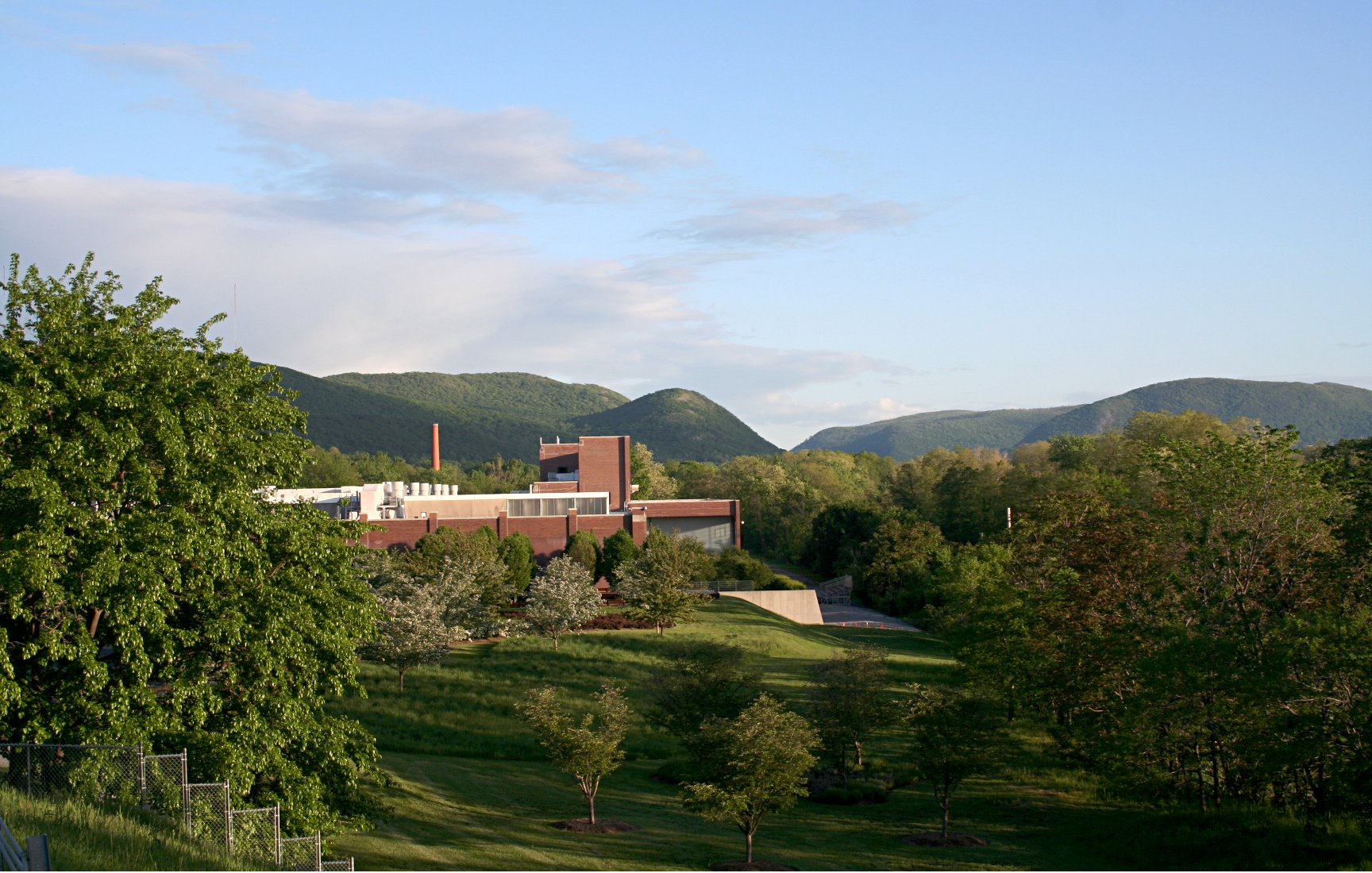
The Dia Beacon building and surrounding landscape.

Dia Beacon, Riggio Galleries in Beacon, New York, is located in a former printing plant built in 1929 by Nabisco. When it opened in 2003 with 160,000 square feet (15,000 m^{2}) of exhibition space, it became one of the largest museums to open in the United States since the Museum of Modern Art opened in the late 1930s.

Each gallery was designed specifically for the art it contains. The space is limited to the works of 25 artists, including Richard Serra's monumental steel sculptures Torqued Ellipses and Michael Heizer's North, East, South, West (1967/2002). The museum's galleries of paintings by On Kawara, Agnes Martin, Blinky Palermo, and Robert Ryman receive reflected north light from more than 34,000 square feet (3,200 m^{2}) of skylights.

Dia collaborated with Robert Irwin and architect OpenOffice to formulate the plan for the museum building and its exterior setting. The grounds include an entrance court, and parking lot with a grove of flowering fruit trees and a formal garden, both of which were designed by Irwin.

According to The New York Times, it cost $50 million to build, with Leonard Riggio contributing at least $35 million of that amount; the remainder of the construction funds came from the Lannan Foundation ($10 million), Ann Tenenbaum and her husband Thomas H. Lee ($2.5 million), among others. As of 2007 its annual operating costs are about $3 million a year.

==== Dia Bridgehampton ====
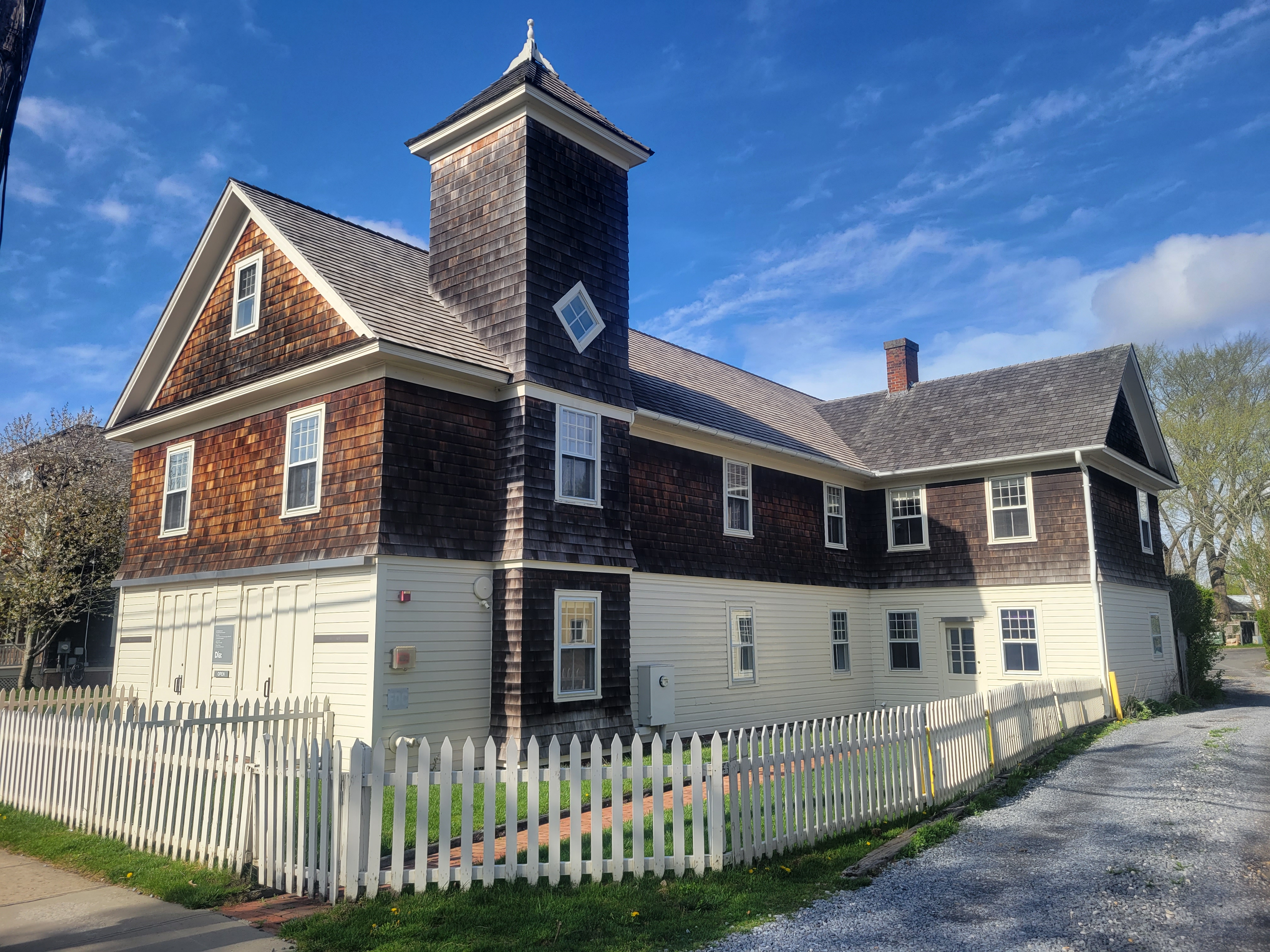
Exterior of Dia Bridgehampton

Dia Bridgehampton, previously known as the Dan Flavin Art Institute, is a museum in Bridgehampton, New York opened in 1983 to house nine fluorescent light works by Dan Flavin on permanent display. Besides the permanent exhibit, there is also a gallery for temporary exhibitions and a display on the history of the building.

==== Dia Chelsea ====
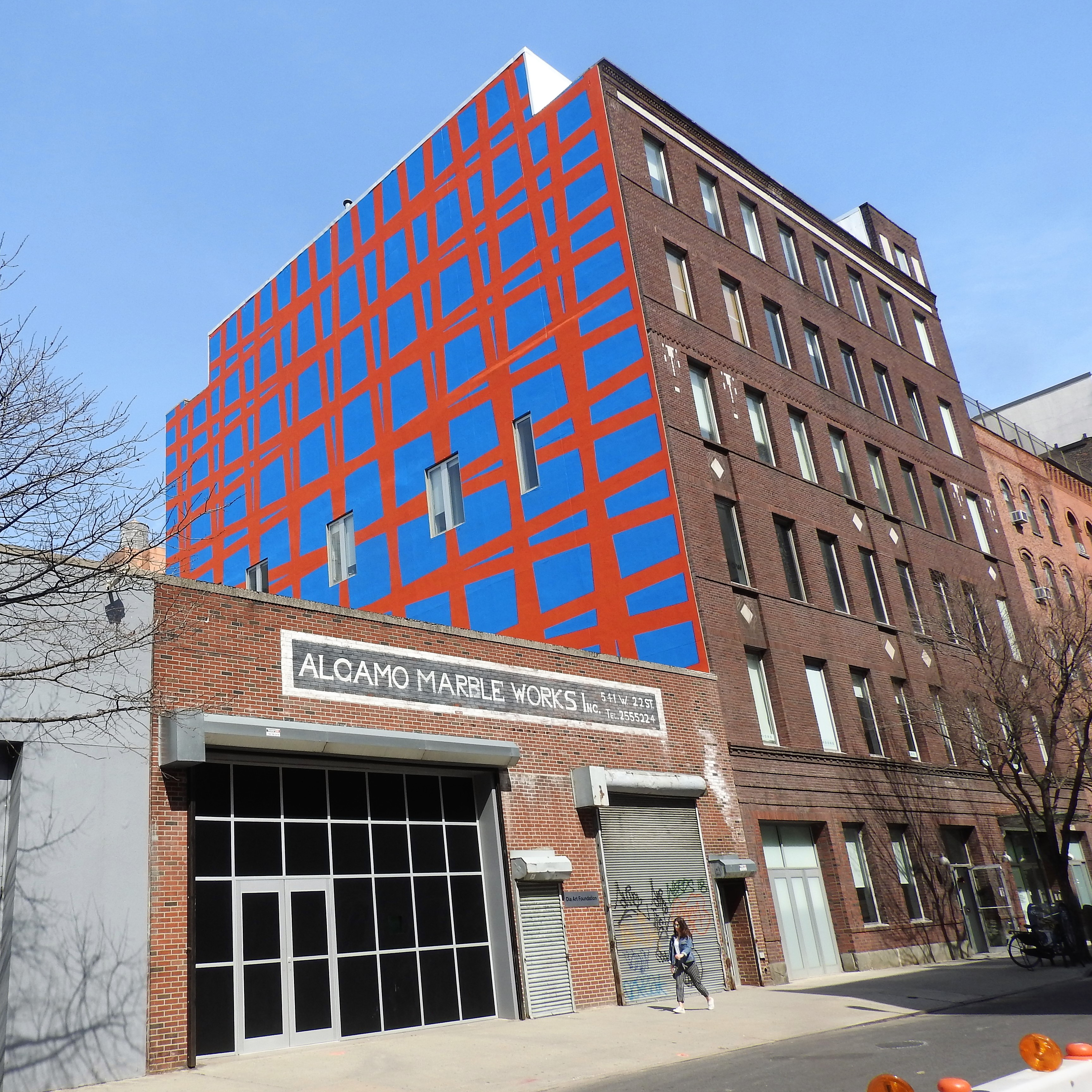
Dia Chelsea before the 2021 renovation

Dia began its presence on West 22nd Street in the Chelsea neighborhood of New York City in 1987 with the opening of the Dia Center for the Arts at 548 West 22nd Street. Dia Chelsea has since moved across the street to a series of three connected buildings now consolidated at 537 West 22nd Street which host longterm but temporary exhibitions as well as associated artistic and educational programing. It is one of the locations and sites the Dia Art Foundation manages.

=== Sites ===
Michael Govan, the former director of Dia under whose direction Dia Beacon was constructed, estimates that before Philippa de Menil's family forced her to sharply cut back on funding—an act precipitated by the 1980s oil glut's effect on the Schlumberger fortune—Dia spent "at least $40 million" on a series of installations that Dia continues to maintain.

Among those 1970s and early 1980s projects are works by Walter De Maria, including The Lightning Field (1977), near Quemado, New Mexico; and The New York Earth Room (1977) and The Broken Kilometer (1979), in New York City.

The 9 sites are:

- 7000 Oaks by Joseph Beuys in New York City
- Depreciation by Cameron Rowland in Edisto Island, South Carolina
- Spiral Jetty by Robert Smithson in the Great Salt Lake at Rozel Point, Utah
- Sun Tunnels by Nancy Holt in Great Basin Desert, Utah
- The Broken Kilometer by Walter De Maria in New York City
- The Lightning Field by Walter De Maria in Quemado, New Mexico
- The New York Earth Room by Walter De Maria in New York City
- The Vertical Earth Kilometer by Walter De Maria in Kassel, Germany
- Times Square by Max Neuhaus in New York City

== Permanent collection ==
Over Dia's first ten years, its founders assembled a collection of a select group of artists. Among those whose work was commissioned and collected at that time are Joseph Beuys, John Chamberlain, Walter De Maria, Dan Flavin, Donald Judd, Imi Knoebel, Blinky Palermo, Fred Sandback, Cy Twombly, Robert Whitman, and La Monte Young. In 1979 the Dia Art Foundation acquired Shadows (1978–79), the monumental painting installation by Andy Warhol consisting of 102 canvases, as a single entity from the artist during its inaugural exhibition at the Heiner Friedrich Gallery in New York.

In 1991 Dia gave the Menil Collection in Houston six of its best works by Twombly in anticipation of the Twombly Gallery that opened there in 1995. In anticipation of the opening of Dia Beacon, Dia augmented its core collection with focused acquisitions. The first of these was made in 1997, when Board Chairman Leonard Riggio and his family gave the Foundation three sculptures from Richard Serra's Torqued Ellipses series (1996–97), sculptures created for an exhibition at Dia Chelsea; it was the first acquisition for Dia's permanent collection in over ten years, a $2 million purchase made by Riggio. With support from the Lannan Foundation, the artists themselves, and others, the collection has expanded with gifts, purchases, and long-term loans of works by other artists from that same generation—Bernd and Hilla Becher, Louise Bourgeois, Hanne Darboven, Michael Heizer, Robert Irwin, On Kawara, Sol LeWitt, Agnes Martin, Bruce Nauman, Gerhard Richter, Robert Ryman, Robert Smithson, and Lawrence Weiner—as well as additional works by artists already represented.

In recent years, Dia has focused on broadening its collection to spotlight a more diverse and international mix of artists. Female artists who have been added to the permanent collection include Mary Corse, Nancy Holt, Dorothea Rockburne, Michelle Stuart and Anne Truitt. In 2017, Dia acquired work by Kishio Suga and Lee Ufan, bringing seminal work from the 1960s Mono-ha movement in Japan into the collection to promote greater understanding of work being made internationally during this period. In 2017, Robert Ryman, a key Dia artist, donated 21 of his works to the institution, making Dia's Ryman holdings unparalleled in any other public collection.

=== Deaccessioning ===
In 1985, Dia Art Foundation for the first time auctioned off 18 works at Sotheby's, including pieces by Cy Twombly and Barnett Newman, for $1.3 million. In 2013, the foundation announced its plan to sell another group of paintings and sculptures — including pieces by Twombly, Chamberlain and Barnett Newman — at Sotheby's, this time hoping to raise at least $20 million for an acquisition budget and to pay for 30 works that have been on long-term loan to Dia from the Lannan Foundation. In response, founders Heiner Friedrich and Fariha de Menil filed suit in New York Supreme Court, seeking an injunction against the foundation and Sotheby's while raising the possibility that some of the works might not be legally owned by Dia but constitute long-term loans from the Friedrichs. However, the lawsuit was dropped shortly after, and the consigned works raised $38.4 million.

== Affiliates ==
Alongside managing 12 locations and sites, Dia also maintains relationships with 6 affiliate institutions. Dia collaborates with and supports these institutions financially, and through donations or sharing of artworks, particularly in the early stages of each organization's development. One of the affiliates, Roden Crater by James Turrell, while being partially funded and supported by Dia since the 70's, is still not completed.

The installation of work by Donald Judd and John Chamberlain, in Marfa, Texas, was begun by Judd; Dia gave the project $4 million between 1980 and 1986, before cutting off the financial support due to Dia's financial crisis; a lawsuit threatened by Judd led to the establishment of the Chinati Foundation with support from Dia.

The affiliate institutions are:

- Andy Warhol Museum in Pittsburgh, Pennsylvania
- Chinati Foundation in Marfa, Texas
- City by Michael Heizer in Garden Valley, Nevada
- Cy Twombly Gallery in Houston, Texas
- Dream House by La Monte Young and Marian Zazeela in New York City
- Roden Crater by James Turrell in Painted Desert, Arizona

== Sam Gilliam Award ==
In 2023, the Sam Gilliam Award was established at the Dia Art Foundation by Gilliam’s foundation and his widow, Annie Gawlak, with plans to give out the prize annually for a decade:

- 2024 – Ibrahim Mahama

== Funding ==
The Dia Art Foundation is a tax-exempt charitable organization. Current programs are supported in part by funds from the members of the Board of Trustees, foundations (such as the Lannan Foundation and the Andy Warhol Foundation for the Visual Arts), and other friends of the institution. As of 2013, Dia' endowment stands at around $55 million.

== Board of trustees ==
Among others, the Dia Art Foundation's board includes collectors Frances Bowes and Howard Rachofsky. Under new director Jessica Morgan's leadership, the Greek shipping magnate George Economou, investor and philanthropist Jeffrey Perelman, and Ra Hee Hong Lee, Irene Panagopoulos, Jane Skinner and James Murdoch joined. Artist trustees have included Brice Marden, Robert Ryman, and George Condo.
