= Cihan Kaan =

American-British musician, filmmaker and author

- Born: 1976 (age 49–50); Dallas, Texas, United States
- Known for: Musician, filmmaker, author
- Notable work: She's Got An Atomic Bomb (film), "Halal Pork and Other Stories" (Novel)
- Website: cihankaan.com

Cihan Kaan (born 1976) is a musician, filmmaker and author from the United Kingdom, who resides in New York. His career began as a musician, releasing and recording electronic music under the alias of 8Bit.

He is best known for his first novel, Halal Pork and Other Stories. It focuses on a post 9/11 world set in New York, exploring the misinterpretations of religion and races. Kaan wrote and directed the short film She's Got an Atomic Bomb. He is also the first British fiction author from both Turkish and Crimean Tatar descent.

== Early life ==
Kaan was born in Dallas, Texas, but at a young age moved to New York. His education took place in New York, where he attended Brooklyn College, taking classes with renowned writer Allen Ginsberg.

He was brought up in a community of Transcendental Meditation he was also influenced early on by Sufism. His father was a translator for Muzaffer Ozak, who was a head sheikh of the Halveti-Jerrahi order of Dervishes. The non-denominational teachings of TM along with the traditional Turkish Sufi order greatly influenced his open views on religion and identity. He has stated of views that, "When you lose yourself inside the memories of your homeland, especially if you are in the United States, you are split—basically, you're experiencing a sort of ethnic schizophrenia...Existing in these beliefs leads to confusion, disappointment and suffering. It is also a feature of ignorance."

== Career ==
=== Music ===
Kaan's first work, a hardcore techno record was released under the name 8Bit in 1995 on Digital Hut Records, a now defunct record label out of Brooklyn, New York and was composed while still a high-school student entirely on a Amiga using tracker software OctaMED. An earlier demo of his composition style had been described by artist The Horrorist as sounding gritty and lo-fi, thus "8bit" and giving rise to the origins of the name. Subsequently, under the pseudonym 8Bit, Kaan released several more records and has his music appear on various compilations across a variety of record labels.

=== Music Videos ===
In 1997, his directorial debut was for the music video "Action High" by punk band Electric Frankenstein. From 1998 to 1999, he began what would be writing a trilogy of music videos for various techno artists. The first of this trilogy was techno act Atomic Babes and their song "Purple", closely followed by "Refuse to fight" for DJ Frankie Bones both of which aired on MTV's electronic music only show MTV's AMP. In 1999 he directed "Playing with Lightning", which also appeared on the soundtrack for the movie Blade.

He has moved from behind the camera to in front appearing in the video "Get Over It".

=== Films ===
In 2005, he wrote and directed a short film titled, 'She's Got an Atomic Bomb' subversively titled but described as focusing on "...the culture of fear – people are scared. I want to focus on issues, but the film is undeniably a comedy that deals with something very serious. It's got punks, mobsters, squatters, thieves, a graveyard-shift manager at a sewage treatment plant – everything is positioned under the street, so to speak." The film was toured at film festivals and four-walled taking various accolades with it. It is a science fiction comedy based on a punk rock femme fatale who is falsely accused of a terrorist plot to blow up a sewage treatment facility in Brooklyn who then plots to build an A-Bomb with the help of the local Russian Mafia. Stylistically the film contains references to John Waters, David Lynch and grindhouse style cinema. The film was subsequently distributed at Hot Topic and GoKart Records. It was also nominated and won awards at other film festivals including, the Coney Island Film Festival, The Lost Film Festival and taking home the Audience Award at the B-Movie Film Festival.

Kaan then went on to write and produce a second short film, 'Shuffle Mode', an avant-garde commentary on technology and edited the feature "Let's Stay Together" which was featured as one of Rolling Out's Great Black Independent Films of 2012.

=== Books ===
His first book, Halal Pork and Other Stories was published in Spring 2011. It was released by UpSet Press, a small press from Brooklyn. It was "...the fastest selling book by a first time author published by UpSet Press".

The publishing of the book made him the first American fiction author from Crimean Tatar descent. His op-ed writing has appeared in a number of places including Al Jazeera English, Elan Magazine

== Style ==
Bomb magazine described his first book Halal Pork & Other Stories, released in 2011, as "...a place where Coney Island meets Mars; where hijabi girls are punk rock dervishes; where identity salesmen count pigeons at insane asylums as a cream cheese conspiracy brews in Gitmo; where rich boys pay to be Muslim for a day; where the transgendered are holy; and where the bacon is halal." Rumpus magazine went on to describe the stories as, "The stories mix Muslim terminology with twisted stereotypes and will capture the interest of anyone seeking to understand Islam in America." It consists of various stories told in different points of view and styles taking place in a surreal New York post 9/11 world exploring the misinterpretations of religion and races in a compelling way.

Moustafa Bayoumi described the book as "Irreverent, urgent, funny and refreshingly unpredictable, Kaan entertains and instructs in devious and delightful ways".

== Generation Change ==
Kaan is a member of Generation Change, a group of Young American Muslims committed to engaging communities towards interfaith understanding and development. The group is a US State Department incentive led by Hillary Clinton.
