= The New York Earth Room =

Installation by Walter De Maria

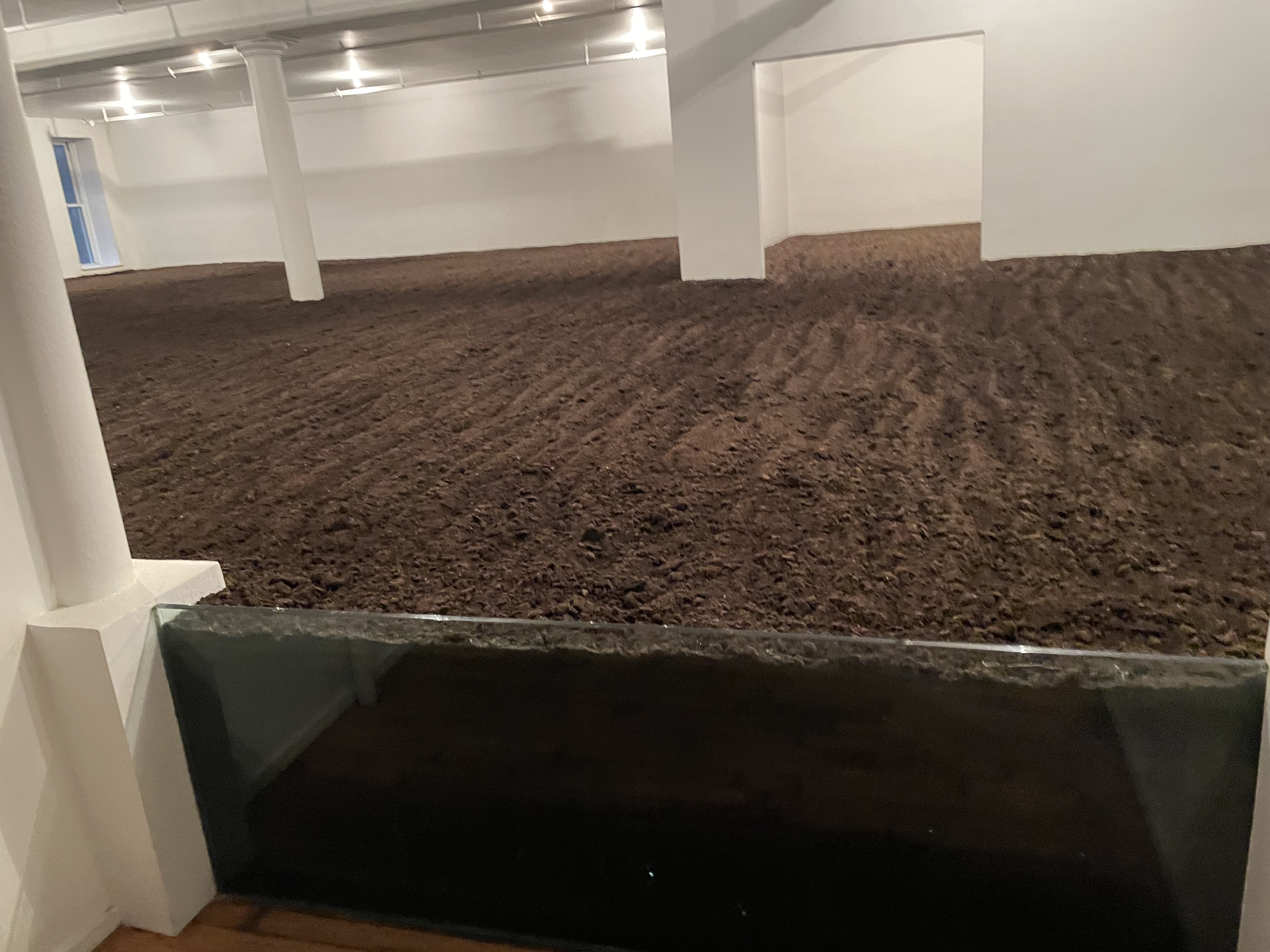
- The New York Earth Room in 2024
- Artist: Walter De Maria
- Year: 1977
- Medium: 250 cubic yards of earth
- Movement: Land Art
- Location: Dia Art Foundation, New York City; 40.7260°N 73.9998°W
- Owner: Dia Art Foundation
- Accession: 1980.135
- Website: www.diaart.org/visit/visit-our-locations-sites/walter-de-maria-the-new-york-earth-room-new-york-united-states/main/earthroom

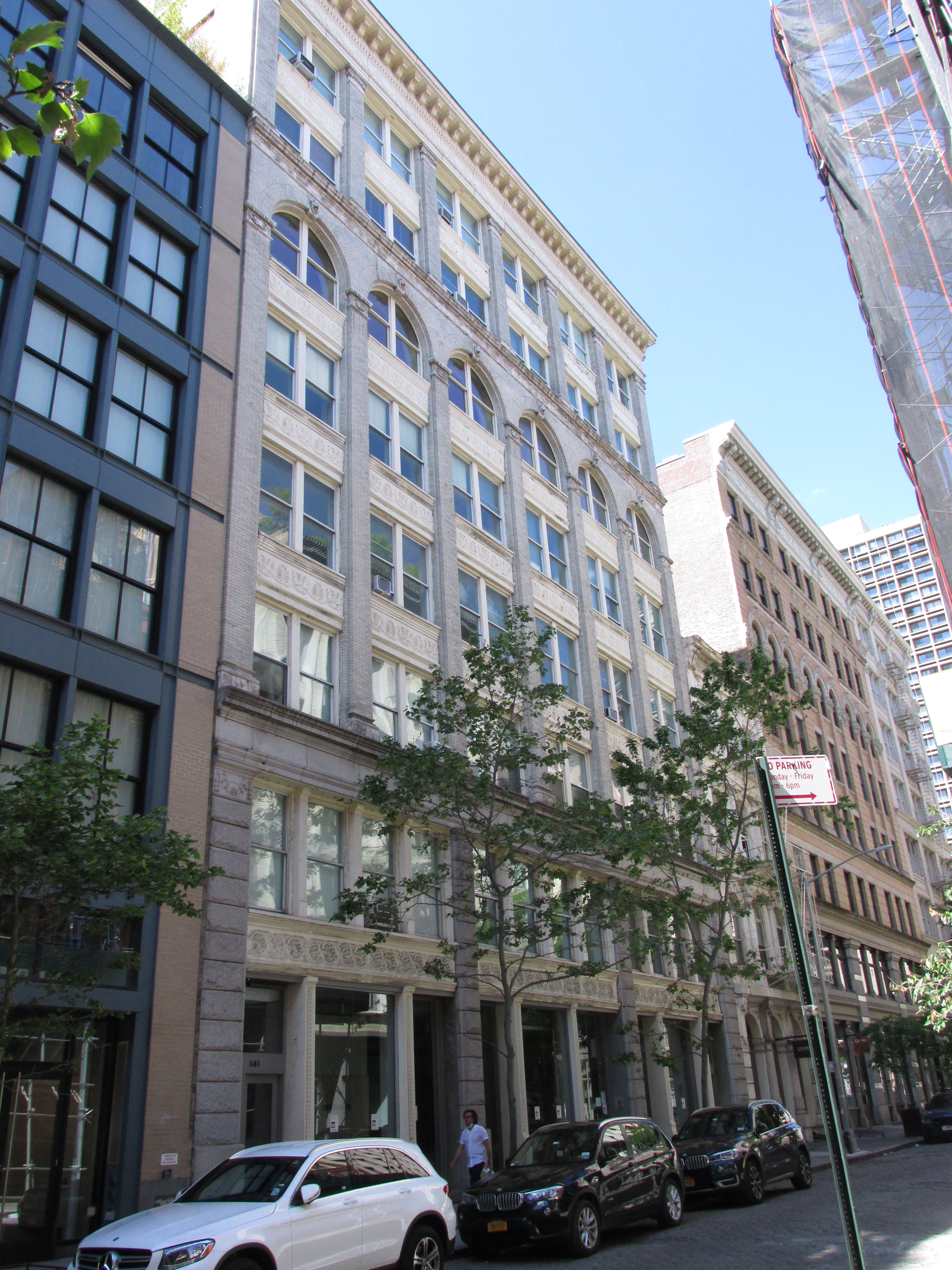
The building housing the New York Earth Room.

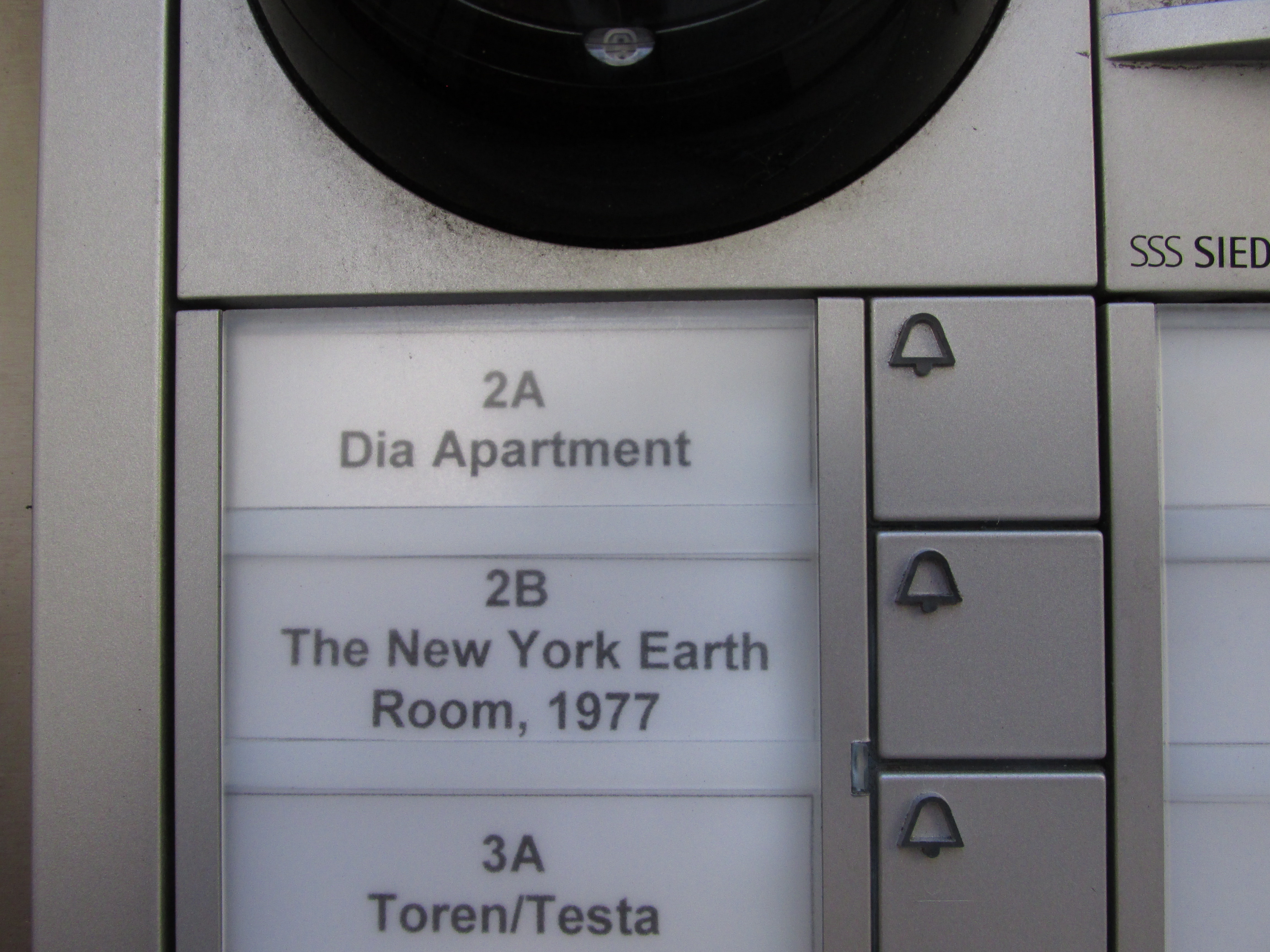
The buzzer that must be pressed to gain entry to the New York Earth Room.

The New York Earth Room is an interior sculpture by the artist Walter De Maria. It has been installed in a loft at 141 Wooster Street in the Tribeca neighborhood of New York City since 1977. The sculpture is a permanent installation of 250 cubic yards (197 cubic meters) of earth in 3,600 (335 square meters) square feet of floor space, and 22 inch depth of material (56 centimeters).

== History ==
There were two previous Earth Room installations prior to The New York Earth Room that no longer exist. The first Earth Room was the Munich Earth Room, installed in 1968 by Walter De Maria and Heiner Friedrich at Galerie Heiner Friedrich in Munich. And the second Earth Room was installed at the Hessisches Landesmuseum in Darmstadt, Germany in 1974.

The work was first installed in New York City in 1977 as a 3-month exhibition, at what was then the Heiner Friedrich Gallery. It remained on display long afterward, and when Friedrich helped to establish the Dia Art Foundation in 1980, he supported its permanent sponsorship of The New York Earth Room.

Similarly to De Maria's Lightning Field installation, his Broken Kilometer and New York Earth Room installations in New York remain on continuous view.

The installation had the same caretaker, painter Bill Dilworth, from 1989 until his retirement in 2024. It is maintained by the Dia Art Foundation who consider it one of their 12 locations and sites they manage. Dia maintains an apartment on the same floor as The New York Earth Room.

== See also ==
- Land art
- Installation Art
- Walter De Maria
