= Tosun Bayrak =

Turkish Sufi and artist (1926–2018)

- Born: Tosun Bekir Bayraktaroğlu; January 21, 1926; Istanbul, Turkey
- Died: February 15, 2018 (aged 92), New York, United States
- Occupation(s): Sufi sheikh, writer, translator, artist
- Spouse: Jean Linder Bayrak
- Website: jerrahi.org

Sheikh Tosun Bayrak al-Jerrahi al-Halveti (January 21, 1926 – 15 February 2018) was an author, artist, translator and Sufi. He served as a government official in Ankara, Honorary Consul of Turkey in Morocco and was the Sheikh of the Jerrahi Order in America. He died on February 15, 2018.

== Biography ==
=== Early life ===
Bayrak was born in Istanbul in 1926. During his childhood, he'd been raised without religion in the household, having rarely visited a mosque with his parents; his interest in Hindu and Buddhist philosopher during high school was one of his few experiences with religion. Early in life, his grandfather helped to spark his interest in art and poetry with trips to museums as well as Topkapı Palace. Initially, he studied Biological Sciences at Robert College, graduating in 1945. It was during his time in college that he first became exposed to Islam as a living practice, lodging on weekends with his aunt who prayed five times a day and fasted during Ramadan.

Bayrak later went on to study Art, Architecture, and Art History in the Studios of Fernand Léger and Andre Lhote in Paris; Architecture at the University of California, Berkeley; and History of Art at the Courtauld Institute of Art, London. While in London, he was an associate of poet Can Yücel and former Prime Minister of Turkey Bülent Ecevit. He received a Masters in Fine Arts from Rutgers University.

=== Sufism ===
In 1970 Bayrak met Muzaffer Ozak, who became his spiritual teacher, at the Jerrahi Lodge in Istanbul. Bayrak became a Sheikh of the Halveti-Jerrahi order and resided near the Jerrahi Order of America mosque in Spring Valley, New York a few years later. He acted as the spiritual guide of the Jerrahi Order of the Americas starting from 1977, and he founded the official mosque of the Order's American branch in Chestnut Ridge, New York in 1990. Though at one time an admirer of Fethullah Gülen, Bayrak condemned the Gülen movement at a winter 2016 art exhibit in Istanbul due to the movement's alleged involvement in the 2016 Turkish coup d'état attempt.

“Service should be from the moment you are born until the moment you give your last breath, but you have to find out in what way. That's what's most important. We have to find out in what manner we are supposed to serve.”

In response to the January 2015 Île-de-France attacks, which ended as Bayrak was planning a Friday sermon, he declared that the perpetrators were insane, not Muslims, and opposed the key teachings of Islam. Bayrak died in New York on 15 February 2018 at the age of 92.

== Works ==
=== Artistry ===
Bayrak taught art and art history at Fairleigh Dickinson University, where he helped to establish the Fine Arts Division. His work was exhibited widely in the United States, and he became a Guggenheim fellow in 1965. He retired from the art world in the 1970s and devoted his life to the study and teaching of Islam and Sufism.

“Both my wife and I were artists, and we felt very strongly that it was feeding our egos. Art, art exhibitions, and the consequences of being accepted and successful are incredible food for your ego, which is the Sufi's enemy. The final straw was when we went to Rome to visit a friend, a sculptor, and there was a very pretty young girl there whom my friend introduced me to. And she was so adoring to me. She said, "Ohhh, I know you. I love your art." She was completely praising me, and I saw the ego suddenly rise up and say, "Aha! This beautiful, spiritual girl is telling you that you are a great artist." So I said, "Oh, my God! That's it. It's over." I hit the ego on the head and decided I was finished with it all.

=== Translation ===
Bayrak translated dozens of books on Islamic spirituality, but he was particularly known for his efforts on the works of the Sufi mystic Ibn Arabi. One of his best known works is Ibn Arabi: The Tree of Being. His translations of classic works of Sufism include Abdul Qadir Gilani's Secret of Secrets, Inspirations, al-Sulami's The Book of Sufi Chivalry, Futuwwah, and Suhrawardi: The Shape of Light. Also, compiled from texts of al-Ghazali, Ibn Arabi, Djili, and Abdul Qadir Jilani, among others: The Name and the Named: Divine Attributes of God, and Imam Birgivi's The Path of Muhammad.

== See also ==
- Ibn Arabi
- Bawa Muhaiyaddeen
