= Blinky Palermo =

German painter

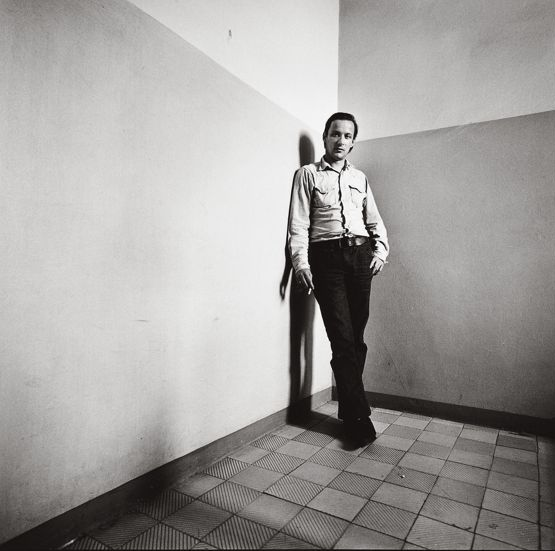
- Blinky Palermo (1970), in a photograph by Lothar Wolleh
- Born: Peter Schwarze; June 2, 1943; Leipzig, Germany
- Died: February 18, 1977 (aged 33); Vihamanaafushi Maldives
- Occupation: German painter

Peter Schwarze (2 June 1943 – 18 February 1977), known by the artistic name Blinky Palermo, was a German abstract painter. He was inspired by painters like Kazimir Malevich, Barnett Newman and Ellsworth Kelly.

== Life and career ==
Palermo was born Peter Schwarze in Leipzig, Germany, in 1943, and adopted as an infant, with his twin brother, Michael, by foster parents named Heisterkamp. He assumed the pseudonym "Blinky Palermo" in 1964, during his studies with Bruno Goller and Joseph Beuys at the Kunstakademie Düsseldorf between 1962 and 1967. The name refers to Frank "Blinky" Palermo, an American Mafioso and boxing promoter who managed Sonny Liston.

In 1969, Palermo moved to Mönchengladbach and set up a studio he would share with Imi Knoebel and Ulrich Rückriem. After a stay in New York in the early 1970s, he moved into Gerhard Richter's former Düsseldorf studio.

Blinky Palermo died in 1977, aged 33, during a trip to the Maldives, of causes that often are referred to as "mysterious" but widely acknowledged as related to Palermo's drug use. His brother Michael Heisterkamp is the sole heir and owner of the copyright of Palermo's work.

== Work ==
Palermo was best known for his spare monochromatic canvases and "fabric paintings" made from simple lengths of colored material cut, stitched and stretched over a frame. He painted on aluminum, steel, wood, paper and Formica, often making lines out of tape instead of paint.

Under Beuys, he became increasingly interested in the organized spatial relationship between form and colour, a polarity which is manifest throughout the rest of his oeuvre. In the mid-1960s, Palermo moved away from conventional rectangular canvases and increasingly opted for surfaces such as the circle, triangle, cruciform, totem pole and even the interior walls of buildings. For example, Untitled (Totem) (1964) "...is simply a vertical strip of wood, 7 feet by about 2 inches. It is painted orange and punctuated, like a primitive ladder, with five short, horizontal pieces of canvas-wrapped wood, each painted white with a portion of a blue triangle". Between 1964 and 1966, Palermo produced a small series of paintings on canvas in which he experimented with constructivist principles of order.

Between late 1966 and 1972 he produced a series of circa 65 Stoffbilder (Fabric Paintings), consisting of colored materials of different widths sewn together along horizontal or vertical seams and attached to stretchers. He took the colour and material quality ready-made from department-store fabrics and had them stitched together by others.

In 1970, he and Gerhard Richter jointly submitted designs for the sports facilities for the 1972 Olympic Games in Munich. For the front of the arena, they proposed an array of glass windows in 27 colors; each color would appear 50 times, with the distribution determined randomly.

Beginning in 1968, Palermo realized more than 20 murals and wall drawings at various sites in Europe, including Edinburgh and Brussels, and recorded them in preparatory sketches and photographic documentation. The original works, however, having been affiliated with their place of installation, no longer exist. His Times of the Day I-IV consists of square, aluminum panels painted in colors arranged from bright to dark, a metaphor for the changing sunlight through the day. He often outlined the shapes of some of the walls in a given room or filled them in with a different color, leaving only a border of the original white. A series of “Metallbilder” (Metal Pictures) followed in 1972, a series of acrylic paintings on steel or aluminium. They follow a consistent formula: groupings of, usually, four panels, fairly widely separated, with each panel bearing a single main acrylic color area bracketed by bands of one other color at the top and the bottom.

After visiting New York with Gerhard Richter in 1970, he moved his practice to New York City in December 1973. Once back in Düsseldorf he produced To the People of New York City (1976), a 15-part work comprising 39 aluminum panels painted in variations of cadmium red, cadmium yellow, and black — the colors of the West and East German flags (and now the German one) - ever changing in pattern. It was shown at the Heiner Friedrich Gallery, New York, in 1977, and at the Dia Art Foundation in 1987.

== Exhibitions ==
Palermo's first solo show was held in 1966 at Galerie Friedrich+Dahlem in Munich. He further participated in more than 70 exhibitions, including at documenta in 1972 and 1977, and at the 13th Bienal de São Paulo in 1975. In 1976, his work Himmelsrichtungen was shown at the Venice Biennale.

In 1987, Dia inaugurated its exhibition space in Chelsea with major shows of works by Palermo, Beuys, and Knoebel. Palermo has also had posthumous retrospectives at the Kunstmuseum Winterthur (1984); Kunstmuseum Bonn (1993); Museu d’Art Contemporani de Barcelona, in co-production with the Serpentine Gallery, London (2002–2003); and the Kunsthalle Düsseldorf (2007). In 2010, the Dia Art Foundation and the Center for Curatorial Studies and Art in Contemporary Culture at Bard College presented a joint retrospective, the first in the United States, of works by Palermo. The show was financed mostly with a $250,000 grant from Gucci and also travelled to the Los Angeles County Museum of Art and the Hirshhorn Museum and Sculpture Garden in Washington. In 2013, the David Zwirner Gallery organized an exhibition of Palermo's works on paper from 1976 to 1977

== Art market ==
Palermo's auction record is held by Untitled (1970), one of his Stoffbilder, a series of fabric paintings, who sold by $6.4 million at Sotheby's, on 25 May 2023. The previous record was held by the fabric painting Rot / Gelb (1968), a slender vertical work measuring approximately 6 1/2 feet high. It sold at Sotheby's, New York, in May 2017 and made $4.5 million. Since Palermo produced only about 56 or so "Stoffbilder", they are highly sought-after by collectors. All but one of the top five highest priced Palermo works at auction have been Stoffbilder. The exception is Manhattan, a 1976 painting consisting of acrylic on steel, in two parts. Manhattan sold at Sotheby's, London, in July 2020 for $2,893,578. Untitled (Stoffbild) (1967–69), a large square panel of cotton fabric on burlap, painted with two bands of solid color of uneven height, respectively dark blue and turquoise, is currently the 4th-highest priced lot. Auctioned from the collection of Gerhard and Anna Lenz at Sotheby's London in 2010, it sold for £1.11 million.

== Collections ==
Public collections holding major works by Palermo include the Museum of Modern Art in New York, the Tate Modern in London, and the Dia Art Foundation. Most of the artist's work, however, remains in the possession of private collectors and museums in Europe.

== Cultural references ==
The Unexpected Death of Blinky Palermo in the Tropics became the title of a painting by Julian Schnabel, now part of the collection of the Stedelijk Museum. In 1993, it was damaged during a rainstorm.
