= Untitled (In memory of Urs Graf) =

Art installation at the Kunstmuseum Basel in Basel, Switzerland

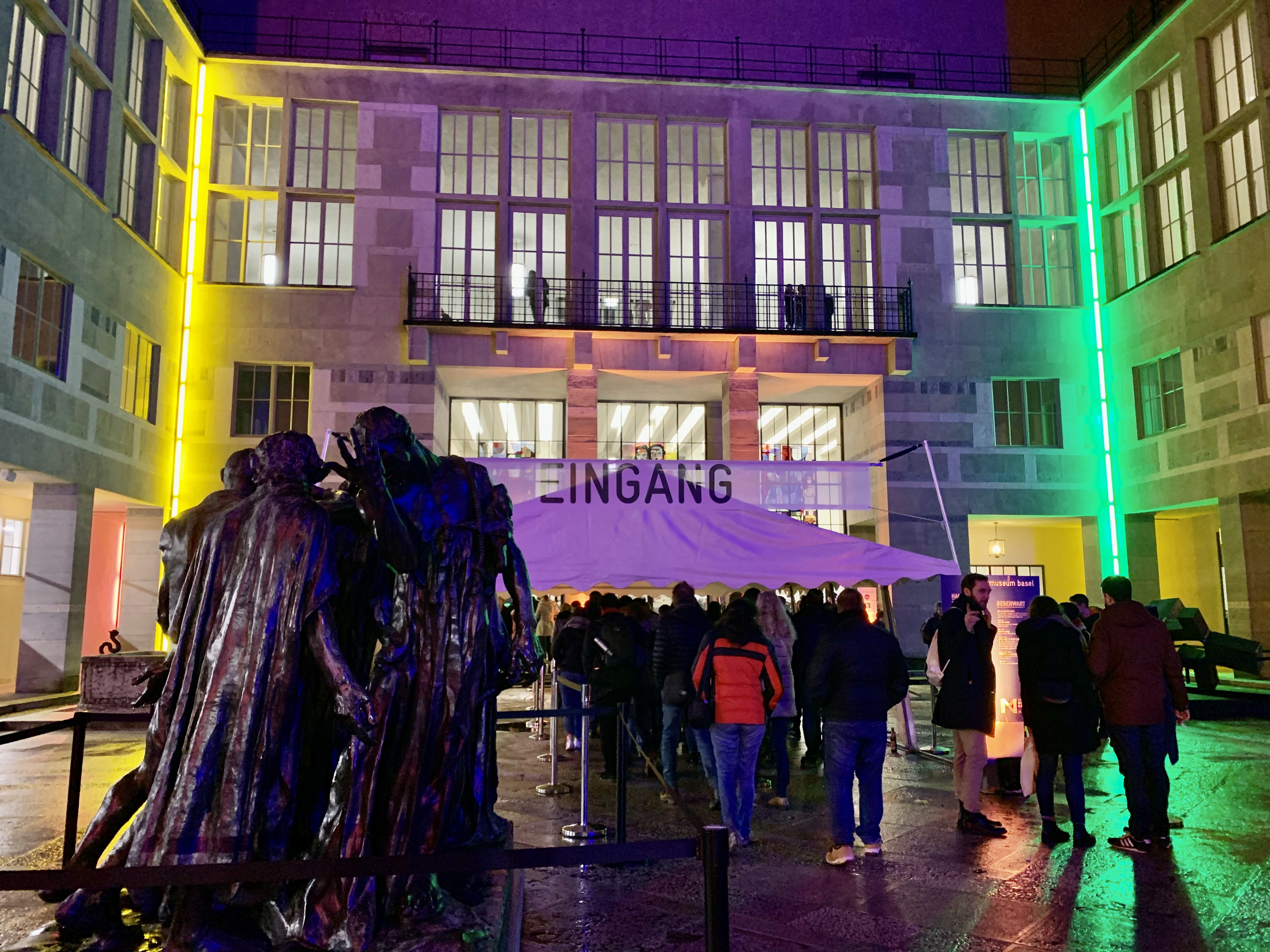
- partial view of Untitled (In memory of Urs Graf) during Musueum Night 2020.
- Artist: Dan Flavin
- Year: 1975
- Medium: fluorescent light
- Movement: Minimalism, Installation art
- Location: Kunstmuseum Basel, Basel, Switzerland
- 47°33′15″N 7°35′39″E
- Accession: G1980.13
- Website: Untitled In memory of Urs Graf

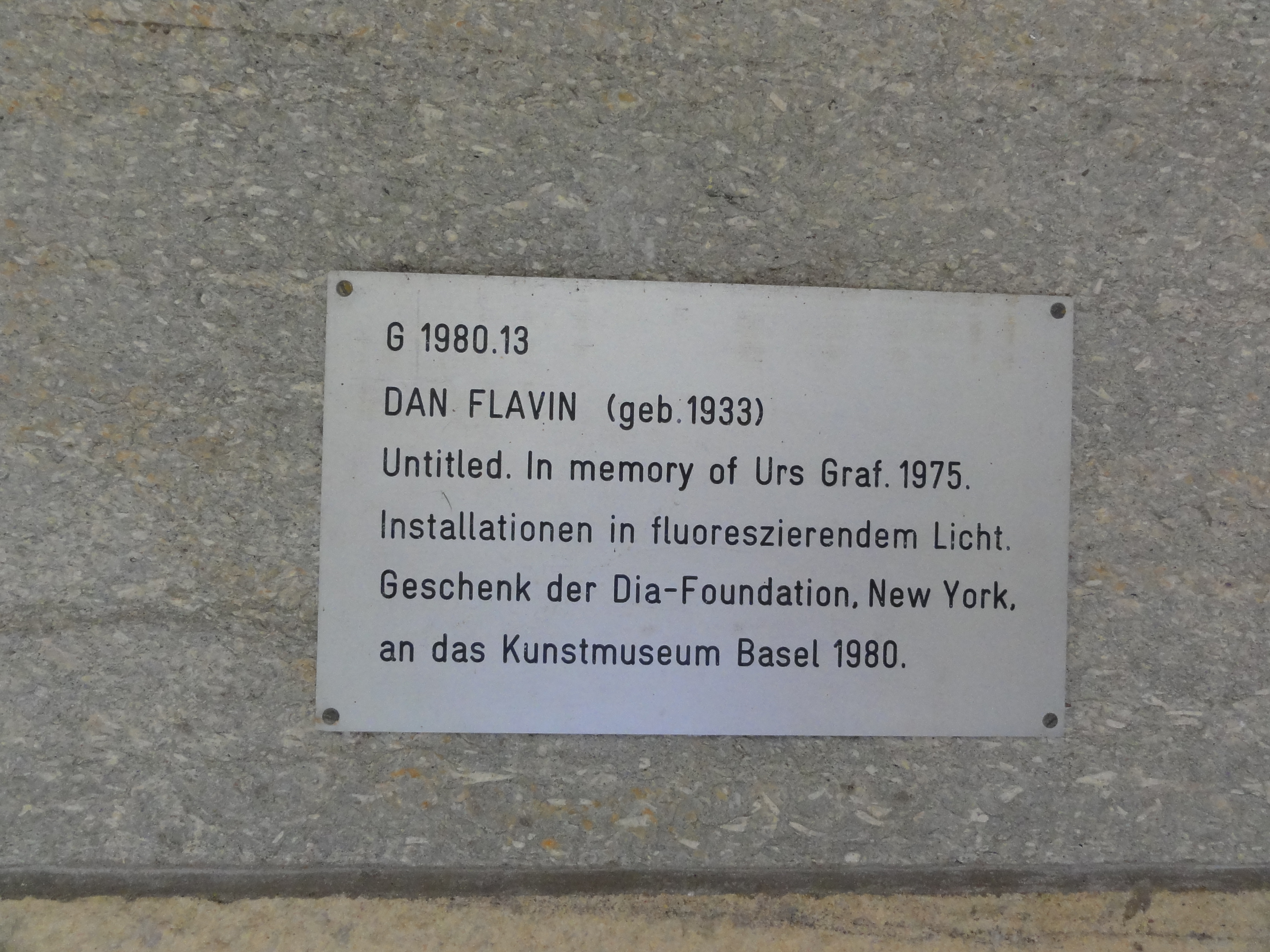
Plaque for Untitled (In memory of Urs Graf)

Untitled (In memory of Urs Graf), also called Untitled in pink, green, and blue fluorescent light by the Dia Art Foundation, is an art installation by Dan Flavin at Kunstmuseum Basel. Untitled (In memory of Urs Graf) consists of eleven fluorescent light units in each of the four corners of the front courtyard of Kunstmuseum Basel and two units in each of the four corners of the arcade gallery. Each unit is 120 centimetres (47 in) long and each grouping is a different color, either pink, yellow, green or blue. The units completely fill the corners stretching from the ground to the top of the balcony parapet. Conceived of in 1972, the installation was installed in 1975. This permanent, outdoor, installation was funded and installed by the Dia Art Foundation as its first major public work. It was subsequently gifted to the Kunstmuseum in 1980.

Flavin dedicated the artwork to Urs Graf, an artist that the Kunstmuseum Basel has significant holdings of.
