= Jessica Morgan =

British curator

Jessica Clare Morgan (born 1968) is a British curator, and the head of New York City's Dia Art Foundation since 2015. She will be director of the Tate from January 2027.

Morgan was born in 1968 in London, England.

She grew up in London with her Welsh father, Leon Morgan, an intellectual property lawyer, and her Irish mother, Finola Morgan, a teacher. Her father left when she was ten, and they later divorced. She has an older sister, Lucy, who was a circus trapeze artist, then an aerial choreographer, and now a lawyer.

Aged 16, she went to Westminster School, then studied art history at King's College, Cambridge and the Courtauld Institute of Art.

She was a curator at Tate from 2002 to 2010, and the Daskalopoulos Curator, International Art, at Tate Modern from 2010 to 2014. In 2014, Morgan directed the Gwangju Bienniale in South Korea.

Morgan will become the tenth Director of the Tate from 1 January 2027, when she succeeds Maria Balshaw.

Morgan is married to Ulrich Lehmann, a professor of design theory and practice at Parsons School of Design, New York City, and they have one son.
