= The Broken Kilometer =

Art installation in New York City

- Artist: Walter De Maria
- Year: 1979
- Medium: Brass
- Movement: Minimalism, Conceptual Art, Land Art
- Location: Dia Art Foundation, New York City
- 40.724077°N 74.002112°W
- Accession: 1980.348.1-.500
- Website: www.diaart.org/visit/visit-our-locations-sites/walter-de-maria-the-broken-kilometer-new-york-united-states

The Broken Kilometer is a permanent art installation created by Walter De Maria inside a street-level storefront in the SoHo neighborhood of New York City. The piece consists of 500 round solid brass rods, 2 meters (6 ft 7 in) long by 2 inches (51 mm) in diameter, laid on the floor in 5 rows of 100 rods each. The space between the rods increase by 5 millimeters. The first two rods of each row are placed 80 millimeters apart, the last two rods are placed 570 millimeters apart. The work is illuminated with metal-halide stadium lights. Commissioned by the Dia Art Foundation in 1979, it has been on view to the public ever since. The Broken Kilometer is maintained by the Dia Art Foundation as one of the twelve locations and sites they manage.

De Maria's 1977 artwork The Vertical Earth Kilometer in Kassel, Germany, is a companion piece to The Broken Kilometer.

== Design ==
The Broken Kilometer is composed of 500 identical round solid brass rods that are highly polished. Each rod is 2 metres (6 ft 7 in) long and 2 inches (51 mm) in diameter. These rods are laid on the ground in five parallel rows of 100 rods each. The first two rods of each row closest to the viewer are placed 80 millimetres (3.1 in) apart, and the space between each subsequent rod increased by 5 millimetres (0.20 in), with the last two rods being 570 millimetres (1.87 ft) apart. The sculpture weighs 18.75 short tons (17,010 kg), and if all of the rods were laid end to end it would stretch for 1 kilometre (0.62 miles). The rods sit inside a 522.6-square-metre (5,625 sq ft) street-level storefront, and the sculpture is illuminated by metal-halide stadium lights to simulate sunlight.

The rods that make up The Broken Kilometer slowly oxidize and are polished every two years. After the rods are polished, their caretaker states in an Artsy interview, "it’s so full of light that it doesn’t even look like metal anymore. It’s almost like radiant heat. It’s so beautiful, just humming with brightness."

The work has one caretaker, Patti Dilworth, who is married to Bill Dilworth, caretaker of The New York Earth Room. Dilworth's work according to Max Lakin "encompasses conservation, custodial duties, security, and, in a large way since De Maria’s death in 2013, curation". Lakin also says that the sculpture "takes on a rhythmic order akin to musicality," and Dilworth notes "as you pace in front of them they appear to vibrate and dance, like a radiant bed of scrupulous moray eels." In 2017, Daisy Alioto studied the online reviews of The Broken Kilometer and discovered patterns in how people respond to the work. Negative reviews centered on underwhelmed visitors who saw the piece as unrightfully taking up valuable real estate, seeing the piece as a "financial interloper, whose cultural merit wasn’t worth its proverbial weight in real estate gold." Positive reviews noted that the piece, as well as The New York Earth Room, was a respite from the city and in contrast to the wildness found on the streets nearby.

== History ==
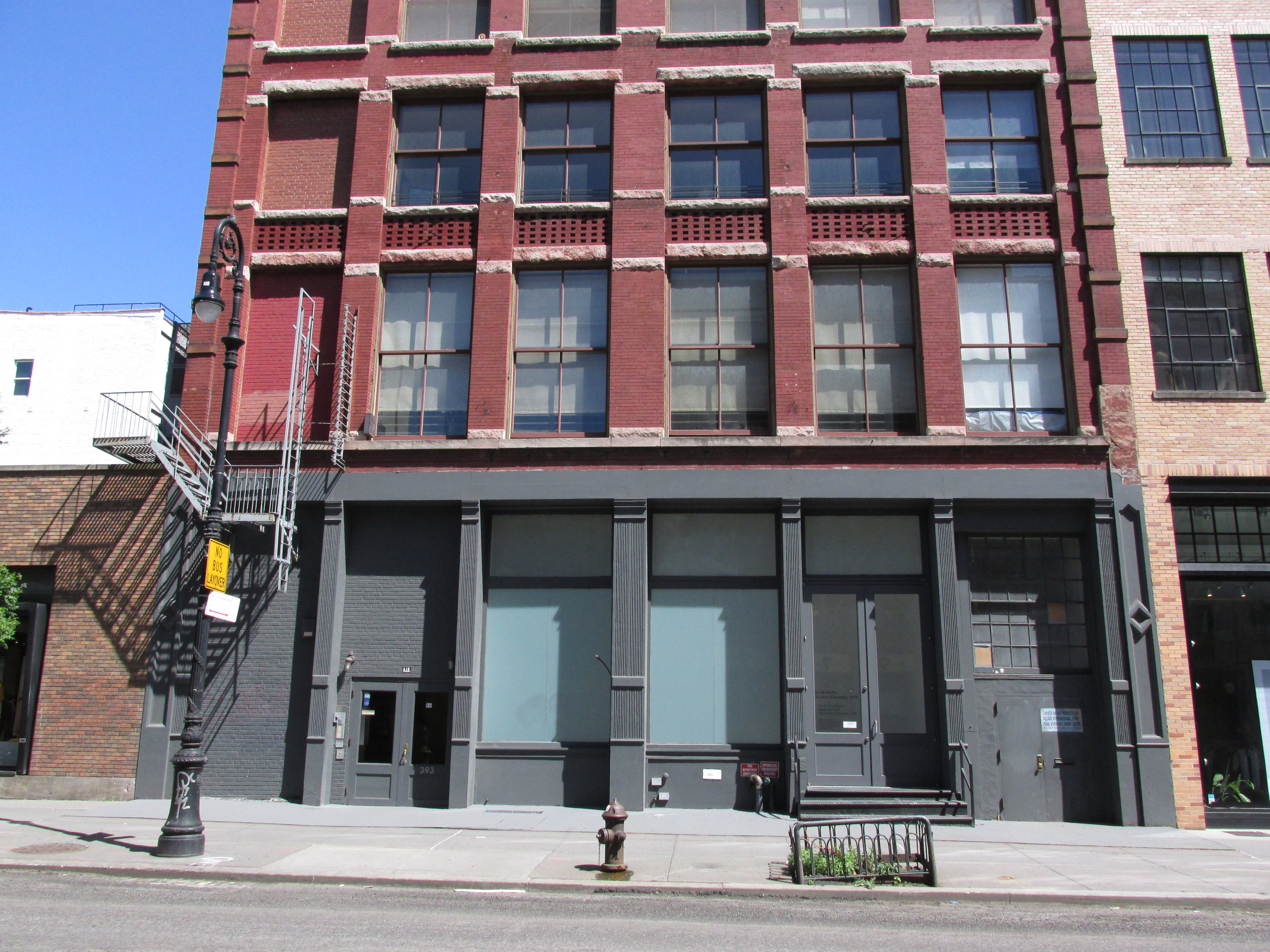
The storefront of the gallery space that houses The Broken Kilometer

The space that now houses The Broken Kilometer was previously the second site of Heiner Friedrich's gallery (the first location of this gallery is two blocks away and where another work by De Maria, The New York Earth Room is now on permanent display). Friedrich was one of the founders of the Dia Art Foundation, which commissioned The Broken Kilometer. The sculpture has been on public display since it was installed in 1979 and is maintained by the Dia Art Foundation as one of eleven locations and sites they manage.

In 1977, De Maria created The Vertical Earth Kilometer, which The Broken Kilometer is a companion piece to. It is in Kassel, Germany, and uses a brass rod with the same weight, length, and diameter as this work.

There have been few changes to the work or the space it is in over the years. The most notable changes include the installation of a bench in the mid 2010s and in 2018 the Dia Art Foundation undertook a $78 million campaign to add to their endowment and renovate all of the spaces it owns, with a new climate control system planned for The Broken Kilometer so it can remain open year-round.
