= Heiner Friedrich =

American art dealer

Heiner Friedrich (born April 14, 1938, in Stettin) is an art dealer and collector of minimal art and conceptual art. Friedrich and his then wife Philippa de Menil, together with Helen Winkler, established the Dia Art Foundation in 1973. Friedrich has exhibited works by Blinky Palermo, Walter De Maria, Donald Judd, La Monte Young, Andy Warhol, Michael Heizer, and Joseph Beuys, among others in his galleries in Germany, but became less interested in short term gallery installations and through Dia began to collect, and support major projects, such as Walter De Maria's The Lightning Field (1977) in New Mexico and purchasing a former military base in Marfa, Texas to enable Donald Judd to create a permanent space for the installation of his large minimal sculptures.

== Early life and work ==
Heiner Friedrich was born the son of metal goods manufacturers Harald Friedrich. He grew up first in Berlin, then in the tranquility of the Upper Bavaria. He married in 1978 Philippa de Menil, the daughter and youngest child of the Texas art collector couple John and Dominique de Menil. Friedrich currently lives in Sagaponack, NY with his current wife Joa Baldinger.

== Munich & Köln ==
Heiner Friedrich established his first gallery in Munich, 1963 and soon after another in Köln, Germany. On 23 July 1963, he opened, with his wife Six Friedrich and Franz Dahlem, an art gallery in Munich called Friedrich & Dahlem. In exhibitions there he showed early examples of minimal art, land art and conceptual art with artists such as Joseph Beuys, Sigmar Polke, Gerhard Richter, Donald Judd, Michael Heizer, Cy Twombly, Walter De Maria, Dan Flavin, John Chamberlain, Andy Warhol and Fred Sandback. Friedrich also issued a second edition in 1970 of the proto-Fluxus artist's book An Anthology of Chance Operations.

== New York ==
In 1972, he moved to a space in New York City at 141 Wooster Street in SoHo. The last exhibition there was Walter De Maria and The New York Earth Room. The New York Earth Room (1977), is a 3,600-square-foot room filled to a depth of 22 inches with 250 cubic yards of earth (the New York work is a permanent iteration of Munich Earth Room, 1968, a temporary installation in Munich). In 1977, the artist recreated the work at the Heiner Friedrich Gallery in New York, which was then permanently installed in 1977 at 141 Wooster Street, New York. Similarly to the Lightning Field, the Broken Kilometer and New York Earth Room installations remain ongoing, maintained by Dia Art Foundation. Heiner Friedrich and Philippa de Menil, together with Helen Winkler, established the Dia Art Foundation in 1973.

== DASMAXIMUM contemporary art ==
In a downtown area in the Bavarian Traunreut Friedrich founded in 2011 DASMAXIMUM contemporary art, a private art museum that shows pop art, minimal art and conceptual art. On display are works by Georg Baselitz, John Chamberlain, Dan Flavin, Imi Knoebel, Walter de Maria and Andy Warhol, among others. There are more than 20 paintings by Andy Warhol housed there.
