= Fred Sandback =

American sculptor (1943–2003)

- Fred Sandback print
- Born: August 29, 1943; Bronxville, New York, US
- Died: June 23, 2003 (aged 59); New York City, US
- Education: Yale University
- Known for: Sculpture, Printmaking
- Movement: Minimalism

Fred Sandback (August 29, 1943 – June 23, 2003) was an American minimalist conceptual-based sculptor known for his yarn sculptures, drawings, and prints. His estate is represented by David Zwirner.

== Life and work ==
Frederick Lane Sandback was born in Bronxville, New York where, as a young man, he made banjos and dulcimers. He majored in philosophy at Yale University (BA, 1966) before studying sculpture at Yale School of Art (MFA, 1969) where he studied with, among others, Knox Martin, and visiting instructors Donald Judd and Robert Morris.

Sandback is primarily known for his Minimalist works made from lengths of colored yarn. The artist's early interest in stringed musical instruments led him to make dulcimers and banjos as a teenager. In 1967, he produced the sculpture that would establish the terms of his mature work. Using string and wire, he outlined the shape of a 20-foot-long 2-by-4 board lying on the floor. Though he employed metal wire and elastic cord early in his career, the artist soon dispensed with mass and weight by using acrylic yarn. His yarn, elastic cord, and wire sculptures define edges of virtual shapes that ask the viewer's brain to perceive the rest of the form. In that way his work can be considered visionary or imaginative, as well as minimal and literal. Indeed, Sandback was fond of installing "corner" pieces whose shadows assist with this form completion process. In describing his work he stated, "It's a consequence of wanting the volume of sculpture without the opaque mass that I have the lines." and "I did have a strong gut feeling from the beginning though, and that was wanting to be able to make sculpture that didn't have an inside." Sandback himself referred to his sculptures operating in pedestrian space, acknowledging both the viewer’s movement through a space and as something to be engaged actively.

Sandback died by suicide in his studio in New York City on June 23, 2003.

== Exhibitions ==
Sandback's first one-person exhibitions were at the Galerie Konrad Fischer, Düsseldorf, and the Galerie Heiner Friedrich, Munich, both in 1968, while the artist was still a graduate student. Following this debut, Sandback exhibited widely his minimalist sculptures and prints in the United States, Europe and elsewhere. His artwork was included in the 1968 Annual Exhibition at the Whitney Museum of American Art, the Biennale of Sydney in 1976, and the Seventy-third American Exhibition at the Art Institute of Chicago in 1979. In 2003, several large Sandback sculptures were permanently installed at Dia's museum in Beacon, New York. That same year, Sandback created Mikado (Sculptural Study for the Pinakothek der Moderne) as site-specific at the then newly opened Pinakothek der Moderne.

Sandback's work was the subject of an extensive survey exhibition organized in 2005 by the Kunstmuseum Liechtenstein, Vaduz (which traveled to the Fruitmarket Gallery, Edinburgh and the Neue Galerie am Joanneum, Graz, in 2006). His work is represented in many public collections including the Centre Georges Pompidou, Paris, The Museum of Modern Art, New York, Museum für Moderne Kunst, Frankfurt am Main, National Gallery of Art, Washington D.C., Solomon R. Guggenheim Museum, New York, Pinakothek der Moderne, Munich, the Art Institute of Chicago, and the Albright-Knox Art Gallery, Buffalo.

== Recognition ==
Sandback was one of a small group of avant garde artists sponsored by the Dia Art Foundation. In 1981 the Dia Art Foundation initiated and maintained a museum of his work, The Fred Sandback Museum in Winchendon, Massachusetts, which was closed in 1996. Dia presented exhibitions of his works in 1988 and in 1996–97. In 2007 the Fred Sandback Archive, a non-profit organization was established primarily to create and maintain an archival resource on Sandback's work. At Christie's New York, his four-part installation Untitled (1968) was sold for $266,500 in November 2010.

== Bibliography (selected) ==
- Fred Sandback: Installations. Krefeld: Museum Haus Lange, 1969. Text by Paul Wember.
- Fred Sandback. Munich: Kunstraum, 1975. Texts by Hermann Kern and Fred Sandback.
- 74 Front Street: The Fred Sandback Museum, Winchendon, Massachusetts. New York: Dia Art Foundation, 1982. Text by Fred Sandback.
- Fred Sandback. Zürich: Kunsthaus Zürich, 1985. Texts by Gianfranco Verna, Lisa Liebmann, and Toni Stooss.
- Fath, Manfred, ed. Fred Sandback: Sculpture, 1966–1986. Munich: Galerie Fred Jahn, 1986. Texts by Manfred Fath, Fred Jahn, and Fred Sandback.
- Fred Sandback: Diagonal Constructions/Broken Lines'. Skulpturen und Zeichnungen. Hannover: Kestner-Gesellschaft, 1987. Texts by Carsten Ahrens, Carl Haenlein, and Fred Sandback.
- Fred Sandback: Die gesamte Grafik. Munich: Galerie Fred Jahn in co-production with Städtisches Museum Leverkusen, Schloss Morsbroich, 1987. Texts by Rolf Wedewer and Fred Jahn. Another edition, without the text of Rolf Wedewer, was published as Fred Sandback: Werkverzeichnis der Druckgrafik, 1970–1986. Munich: Galerie Fred Jahn, 1987.
- Fred Sandback: Vertical Constructions. Münster: Westfälischer Kunstverein, 1987. Texts by Marianne Stockebrand and Fred Sandback.
- Fred Sandback: Sculpture. New Haven, Conn.: Yale University Art Gallery, in association with Contemporary Arts Museum, Houston, 1991. Texts by Suzanne Delehanty, Richard S. Field, Sasha M. Newman, and Phyllis Tuchman.
- Fred Sandback. Stockholm: Magasin 3, Stockholm Konsthall, 1991. Text by Sasha M. Newman.
- von Drathen, Doris. “Fred Sandback.” Künstler: Kritisches Lexikon der Gegenwartskunst, vol. 23, 1993.
- Fred Sandback: Sculpture. Exh. brochure. New York: Dia Center for the Arts, 1996. Text by Lynne Cooke.
- “Lines of Inquiry: Interview by Joan Simon.” Art in America 85, no. 5 (May 1997), pp. 86–93, 143.
- Fetz, Wolfgang, ed. Fred Sandback. Bregenz: Bregenzer Kunstverein, Palais Thurn und Taxis, 1997. Interview with Fred Sandback by Joan Simon.
- Mavridorakis, Valérie. Fred Sandback ou le fil d’Occam. Brussels: La Lettre volée, 1998.
- Fred Sandback: Escultura. Mexico City: Museo Tamayo, 2002. Texts by Sari Bermúdez, Saul Suarez, Lynne Cooke, and Fred Sandback. Interview with Fred Sandback by Joan Simon.
- Mark C. Taylor. "Apprehension." In Robert Lehman Lectures on Contemporary Art, vol. 2. Ed. Lynne Cooke and Karen Kelly. New York: Dia Center for the Arts, 2003.
- Stephanie Cash, David Ebony, “Obituaries: Fred Sandback.” Art in America 91, no. 9 (September 2003), p. 142.
- Fred Sandback. New York: Zwirner & Wirth, Lawrence Markey Gallery, 2004. Texts by Fred Sandback.
- Fred Sandback, 1943–2003. Zürich: Annemarie Verna Galerie, 2004. Text by Gianfranco Verna.
- Fred Sandback Prints: A Survey. Exh. brochure. New York: Susan Sheehan Gallery, 2004. Text by Andrew Ehrenworth.
- Fred Sandback. Vaduz: Kunstmuseum Liechtenstein; Edinburgh: Fruitmarket Gallery; Graz: Neue Galerie am Landesmuseum Joanneum; Bordeaux: capcMusée d’art contemporain; Ostfildern-Ruit: Hatje Cantz, 2005. Texts by Christiane Meyer-Stoll, Yve-Alain Bois, Thomas McEvilley, Thierry Davila, et al., ISBN 3-7757-1720-X
- Fred Sandback. Cambridge, England: Kettle’s Yard, 2005. Texts by Elizabeth Fisher, Michael Harrison, Lynne Cooke, and Fred Sandback. Published with separate insert documenting the exhibition.
- Fred Sandback: Drawings/Zeichnungen, 1968–2000. Zürich: Annemarie Verna Galerie; Düsseldorf: Richter Verlag, 2005. Text by Gianfranco Verna.
- Fred Sandback: Sculpture and Related Works. Exh. brochure. Sioux City: Sioux City Art Center, 2005. Text by David Raskin.
- Fred Sandback: Sculpture and Related Works. Laramie: University of Wyoming Art Museum, 2006. Texts by Susan Moldenhauer and David Raskin.
- David Raskin, “Art That Just Goes ‘Ping’: Sandback’s Vibration.” Apollo 165 (March 2007): 72-77.
- Fred Sandback. Exh. cat. (New York: Zwirner & Wirth, 2007). Texts by Pamela M. Lee and Fred Sandback.
- Fred Sandback. Exh. cat. (Goettingen and New York: Steidl/David Zwirner, 2009). Text by John Rajchman
- Fred Sandback. Auckland: Jensen Gallery, 2009. Text by Leonhard Emmerling.
- Tone, Lilian. Fred Sandback. Rio de Janeiro and São Paulo: Instituto Moreira Salles, 2010.
- Fred Sandback: Räume zeichnen/Drawing Space. Bielefeld: Kerber Verlag, 2011. Texts by Reinhard Spieler and Kerstin Skrobanek. Interview with Fred Jahn by Kerstin Skrobanek.
- Fred Sandback. Denver, Colorado: Museum of Contemporary Art, 2011. Texts by David Adjaye, Adam Lerner, and Fred Sandback.
- Lawrence, James. Fred Sandback. New York: David Zwirner; Santa Fe: Radius Books, 2013.
- Schwarz, Dieter, ed. Fred Sandback: Drawings. Düsseldorf: Richter Verlag, 2014. Texts by Mark Godfrey, Heinz Liesbrock, Dieter Schwarz, Edward Vazquez, and Gianfranco Verna.
- Fred Sandback: Prints, 1970–2000. London: Sims Reed Gallery, 2015. Texts by Lyndsey Ingram and Nancy Princenthal.
- Fred Sandback. Madrid: Galería Cayón, 2015. Text by Edward Vazquez.
- Fred Sandback: Light, Space, Facts. Texts by Emily Wei Rales, and Mitchell Rales, Harry Cooper, and Briony Fer. Potomac, MD: Glenstone; Munich, London, New York: Delmonico Prestel, 2016.
- Fred Sandback: Vertical Constructions. New York: David Zwirner Books, 2017. Texts by Yve-Alain Bois, David Gray, and Lisa LeFeuvre.
- Vazquez, Edward. Aspects: Fred Sandback’s Sculpture. Chicago and London: University of Chicago Press, 2017.
- Luis Barragán/Fred Sandback. Las propriedades de la luz/The Properties of Light. Berlin: Hatje Cantz; Mexico City: Proyectos Monclova, 2017. Texts by Federica Zanco, Daniel Garza Usabiaga; discussion with Roger Duffy, Amavong Panya, Lilian Tone, and Edward Vazquez.
- Celant, Germano. Fred Sandback. Milan and London: Cardi Gallery, 2018. Text by Fred Sandback.
- Mavridorakis, Valérie. Fred Sandback, ou le fil d’Occam. Paris: Galerie Marian Goodman, 2018. Expanded and revised edition.
- Fred Sandback: Obangsaek. Seoul: Gallery Hyundai, 2019. Text by Yve-Alain Bois (reprint of “A Drawing that Is Habitable," 2005).
- A detailed exhibition history and bibliography, 1967–2005, together with the artist’s collected writings and interviews, is published in the exhibition catalogue Fred Sandback, Vaduz: Kunstmuseum Liechtenstein, 2005; an updated history from 2004–2009 is published in the exhibition catalogue Fred Sandback, New York: David Zwirner; Göttingen:Steidl, 2009. The years 2009–2012 are covered in the exhibition catalogue Fred Sandback: Decades, New York: David Zwirner; Santa Fe: Radius Books, 2013; 2013–2016 is covered in Fred Sandback: Vertical Constructions. New York: David Zwirner Books, 2017.

A complete exhibition history and bibliography is available online at fredsandbackarchive.org.
