= Ömer Tuğrul İnançer =

Turkish lawyer and sufi musician (1946–2022)

Personal life
- Born: 5 May 1946 Bursa, Turkey
- Died: 4 September 2022 (aged 76) Istanbul, Turkey
- Education: Istanbul University

Religious life
- Religion: Islam
- Denomination: Sunni
- Jurisprudence: Hanafi
- Tariqa: Jerrahi
- Creed: Maturidi

Muslim leader
- Disciple of: Muzaffer Ozak

Ömer Tuğrul İnançer (5 May 1946, Bursa - 4 September 2022, Istanbul) was a Turkish lawyer, Sufi musician, and Shaykh of the Jerrahi Order. He retired from his duty as the founding general manager of the Istanbul Historical Turkish Music Ensemble affiliated with the Turkish Ministry of Culture and Tourism.

İnançer's father was a forest manager at the Forest Department. He was born in 1946 in Bursa, where his father worked. He completed his primary and secondary education in Bursa. He was directed to Western music lessons at Bursa Teachers' Association by a music teacher in secondary school. He continued these courses for three years. Later, he took private lessons from master muezzins of Bursa's mosques. He then enrolled in the Bursa Musical Society.

İnançer completed his higher education at Istanbul University Faculty of Law. When he came to Istanbul, he entered the Üsküdar Music Society and became a student of Emin Ongan. Here he turned to Sufi music. After graduation, he worked as a legal consultant until 1991. He was appointed the general director of the Istanbul Historical Turkish Music Ensemble affiliated with the Ministry of Culture and Tourism in 1991, and a member of the Society for the Protection and Propagation of Turkish Sufi Music.

He took part in the musical team at the Shab-i Arus Mevlevi ceremonies held in Konya every December since 1971. Due to his high level of musical knowledge, he took part as the leader.

From 1999 to 2022, he served as the Shaykh of the Jerrahi tariqa based in the Istanbul Jerrahi Center at Karagümrük, Fatih.

Ömer Tuğrul İnançer died on 4 September 2022 at his home in Üsküdar, Istanbul.

== TV and radio programs ==
- Tuğrul İnançer ile Seyir Defteri (Burç FM)
- Mesneviden: Mehmet Fatih Çıtlak ile birlikte (Mehtap TV)
- Ömer Tuğrul İnançer ile Gönül Dünyamız: Saadettin Acar ile birlikte (TRT Türk)
