= The Vertical Earth Kilometer =

Art installation in Kassel, Germany

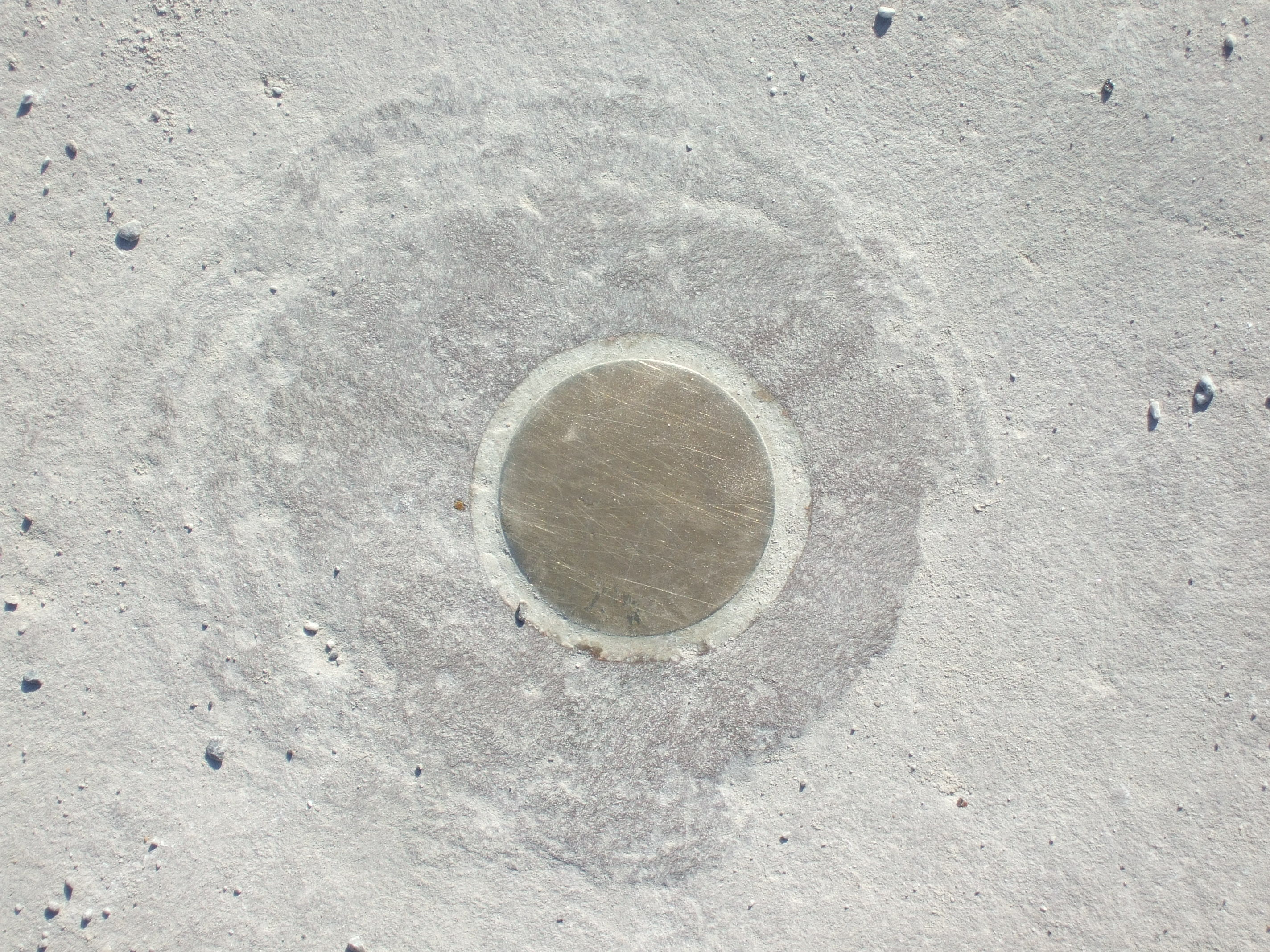
- The only part of The Vertical Earth Kilometer visible above ground
- Artist: Walter De Maria
- Year: 1977
- Medium: Brass
- Movement: Minimalism, Conceptual Art, Land Art
- Location: Dia Art Foundation, Kassel, Germany
- 51.313198°N 9.496728°E
- Accession: 1977.002
- Website: www.diaart.org/visit/visit-our-locations-sites/walter-de-maria-the-vertical-earth-kilometer-kassel-germany

The Vertical Earth Kilometer is a permanent art installation created by Walter De Maria in Friedrichsplatz Park in front of the Fridericianum in Kassel, Germany. The Vertical Earth Kilometer is a solid brass rod, one kilometer (3,280.84 ft.) in length and 2 inches (5.1 cm) in diameter. It is inserted into the earth so that its top is flush to the ground and embedded in a two-by-two-meter red sandstone square. Installed in 1977 during documenta 6, it has been on permanent view ever since. The Vertical Earth Kilometer is maintained by the Dia Art Foundation as one of the twelve locations and sites they manage.

De Maria's 1979 artwork The Broken Kilometer in New York City is a companion piece to The Vertical Earth Kilometer.

== Design ==
The Vertical Earth Kilometer is an 18-ton round solid brass rod. It is five centimeters in diameter and one kilometer long. The rod is inserted into the earth so that a five-centimeter-wide end sits flush with the surface of the earth and is embedded in the center of a two-by-two-meter square red sandstone plate. The work is installed in Kassel, Germany, in Friedrichsplatz Park in front of the Fridericianum, and has no label or plaque marking it as artwork or explaining what it is.

When viewing the top of the artwork, the only part visible from above ground, Ella Morton, a reporter for Slate magazine said "it looks like a coin that’s been dropped, forgotten, and trodden on over several decades," and Ken Jennings of Condé Nast Traveler notes that the work resembles a Kilometre zero marker seen in many European countries.

Documenta proposes many interpretations of the piece including "the hidden rod is meant to prompt us to reflect on the Earth and its place in the universe" and "a symbolic act of restoring a valuable metal to the exploited Earth." Documenta also notes that The Vertical Earth Kilometer is a piece of Minimal, Conceptual, and Land art, the three "significant artistic strategies of the period."

== History ==
Created in 1977 for documenta 6: “Art in the media – media in art”, the Dia Art Foundation funded the barely visible but monumental sculpture. A Texas oil company was hired by De Maria, under the direction and supervision of the Kassel-based engineering firm of Hans Jurgen Pickel, to install the artwork. A narrow, one-kilometer-deep shaft was bored, cutting through six geological layers. The brass rod was lowered into the bore hole in segments, which were screwed together as they went, to form the full one-kilometer rod. It took 79 days to install the work, during which locals had to endure loud drilling noises. Locals were also unhappy with the total cost of the virtually invisible artwork, 750,000 Deutsche Marks (approximately US$2 million in 2016 values).

The Vertical Earth Kilometer has been on permanent public display since it was installed in 1977, and is maintained by the Dia Art Foundation as one of the eleven locations and sites they manage.

In 1979, De Maria created The Broken Kilometer as a companion piece to The Vertical Earth Kilometer. It is in the SoHo neighborhood in New York City and uses a brass rod of the same weight, length, and diameter as this work.
