= Nur Ashki Jerrahi Sufi Order =

Sufi Order primarily based in Turkey and North America

The Nur Ashki Jerrahi Sufi Order, also known as the Jerrahi Sufi Order, is a Sufi order based in New York City and Mexico City. Founded by Muhammad Nur al-Din al-Jerrahi, in Turkey in the 1700s, it is led by American Sufis Lex Hixon (alias Nur al-Anwar al-Jerrahi) and Fariha Fatima al-Jerrahi after they received initiation from their spiritual guide Muzaffer Ozak Ashki al-Jerrahi, the Grand Sheikh of the Jerrahi Order from 1966 until his death in 1985. Sheikh Muzaffer Ozak was the 19th successor of the founder, Muhammad Nur al-Din.

The organization is based at their Sufi lodges in downtown Manhattan, the Mezquita María de la Luz in Mexico City, as well as in various lodges throughout the U.S. and worldwide.

The order claims to "joyfully welcome into our gatherings students of all sacred paths and sincere seekers of any personal orientation" and claims to be "a nonpolitical organization and rejects discrimination based on race, religion, gender and ethnicity".

When Lex Hixon died in 1995, Fariha Fatima al-Jerrahi of New York and Amina Teslima al-Jerrahi of México succeeded him as leaders of the organization. Feisal Abdul Rauf served as the Imam of Dargah al-Farah from 1983 to 2009 and is one of the people behind the Cordoba Initiative.
