= Walter De Maria =

American artist, sculptor, illustrator and composer (1935–2013)

- De Maria in 1968
- Born: October 1, 1935; Albany, California, US
- Died: July 25, 2013 (aged 77); Los Angeles, California, US
- Known for: Installation art, sculpture
- Movement: Minimalist, Land art

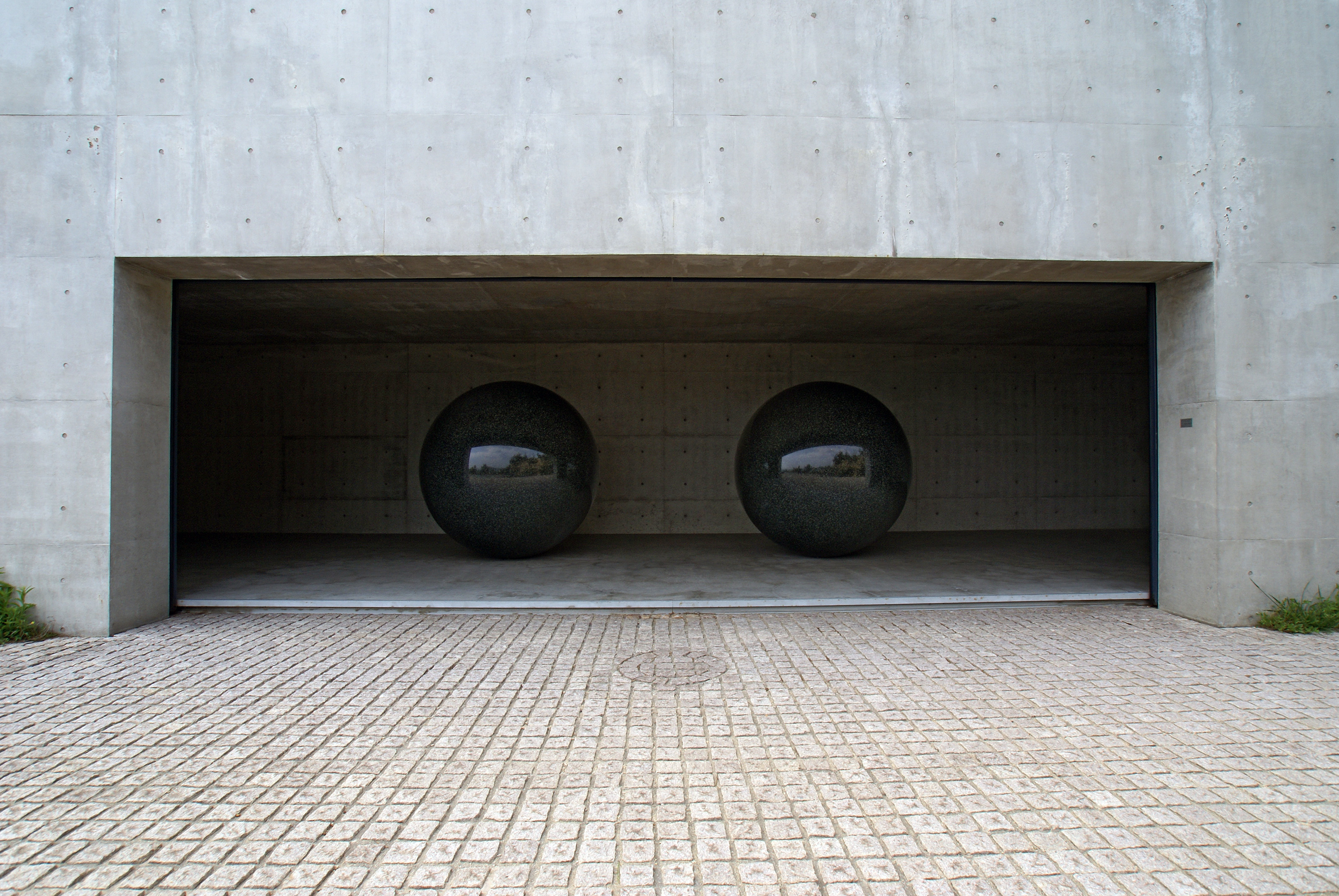
"Seen/Unseen Known/Unknown" at Benesse House, Naoshima, Kagawa prefecture, Japan

Walter Joseph De Maria (October 1, 1935 – July 25, 2013) was an American artist, sculptor, illustrator and composer, who lived and worked in New York City. Walter de Maria's artistic practice is connected with minimal art, conceptual art, and land art of the 1960s.

LACMA director Michael Govan said, "I think he's one of the greatest artists of our time." Govan, who worked with De Maria for a number of years, found De Maria's work "singular, sublime and direct".

== Life and career ==
De Maria was born in 1935 in Albany, California. His parents were the proprietors of a local restaurant in Albany and were socially very active, while their son was mostly concentrated on music. Walter De Maria's first academic interest was music—first piano, then percussion. He also took to sports and cars, of which he made drawings. By 1946 he had joined a musicians' union.

De Maria studied history and art at the University of California, Berkeley from 1953 to 1959. Trained as a painter, he soon turned to sculpture and began using other media. In 1960, De Maria and his friends, the avant-garde composers La Monte Young and Terry Riley, participated in happenings and theatrical productions in the San Francisco area. From his exposure to the work of La Monte Young and dancer Simone Forti, among others, De Maria developed an interest in task-oriented, game-like projects that resulted in viewer-interactive sculptures. For example, his Boxes for Meaningless Work (1961) is inscribed with the instructions, "Transfer things from one box to the next box back and forth, back and forth, etc. Be aware that what you are doing is meaningless."

In 1960, De Maria moved to New York City where he married his wife Susanne Wilson (later Susanna) one year later.

His early sculptures from the 1960s were influenced by Dada, suprematism and constructivism. This influence led De Maria into using simple geometric shapes and industrially manufactured materials such as stainless steel and aluminium – materials which are also characteristic of Minimal art. With the support of collector Ethel Scull, De Maria started making pieces in metal in 1965.

Also in the mid-1960s, he became involved in various artistic activities. His piece, Cage, for John Cage, was included in the seminal 1966 Primary Structures exhibit at the Jewish Museum in New York. He appeared in happenings, composed two musical works (Cricket Music, 1964; Ocean Music, 1968), and produced two films (Three Circles and Two Lines in the Desert; Hardcore, both 1969).

De Maria briefly ran a gallery on Great Jones Street in lower Manhattan with his wife Susanna, showing Joseph Cornell's collection of rare films, Robert Whitman's Happenings (he was then married to and created with dancer/artist Simone Forti), and exhibiting De Maria's Minimalist sculptures made of wood.

In 1965 De Maria briefly served as the drummer of the New York-based rock group the Primitives and an artist/musician collaborative group called The Druds. The Primitives included Lou Reed and John Cale and was a precursor to The Velvet Underground. In 1980, De Maria bought a four-story, 16,400-square-foot Con Edison substation at 421 East Sixth Street, and an adjacent lot at No. 419, between First Avenue and Avenue A. In February 2014, this property was selling for $25 million. Businessman and art collector Peter Brant purchased De Maria's studio for $27 million. Brant's plans for the space were unknown. The building was developed into the "Brant Art Center," part of the Peter Brant collection. https://www.brantfoundation.org/visit/

De Maria went to California in May 2013 to celebrate his mother's 100th birthday and had a stroke there a few days later. He remained there for treatment. He died in Los Angeles on July 25, 2013, at the age of 77. He was survived by his mother, Christine De Maria; his brother, Terry; four nieces; four nephews; and four grandnieces and two great-grandnieces.

== Installations ==
From 1968 De Maria produced Minimalist sculptures and installations such as the Munich Erdraum of 1968. He realized Land art projects in the deserts of the south-west US, with the aim of creating situations where the landscape and nature, light and weather would become an intense, physical and psychic experience. In his work, De Maria stressed that the work of art is intended to make the viewer think about the earth and its relationship to the universe.

The Lightning Field (1977) is De Maria's best-known work. It consists of 400 stainless steel posts arranged in a calculated grid over an area of 1 mile × 1 km. The time of day and weather change the optical effects. It also lights up during thunder storms. The field is commissioned and maintained by Dia Art Foundation. It has been speculated that The Lightning Field influenced the imagery of author Cormac McCarthy's epilogue in his 1985 novel, Blood Meridian.

In the 1960s and 1970s, De Maria created enduring urban works. As complementary pieces, Vertical Earth Kilometer (1977), and The Broken Kilometer (1979), address the idea of unseen or abstracted distance. Vertical Earth Kilometer is a one-kilometer-long brass rod, two inches in diameter, drilled into Friedrichsplatz Park in central Kassel, Germany. The rod's circular top, flush to the earth's surface, is framed by a two-meter square plate of red sandstone. In 1979, De Maria meticulously arranged five hundred brass rods for The Broken Kilometer, a permanent installation at 393 West Broadway in New York.

In contrast to the hard metal of both Kilometer pieces, the third of these urban works, The New York Earth Room (1977), is a 3,600-square-foot room filled to a depth of 22 inches with 250 cubic yards of earth (the New York work is a permanent iteration of Munich Earth Room, 1968, a temporary installation in Munich). Also in 1977, the artist recreated the work at the Heiner Friedrich Gallery in New York, which was then permanently reinstalled in 1980 at 141 Wooster Street, New York.

The Broken Kilometer is also part of De Maria's series of monumental sculptures using a horizontal format, which feature groupings of elements ordered according to precise calculations. This series includes 360°/I-Ching (1981), A Computer Which Will Solve Every Problem in the World/3-12 Polygon (1984), 13, 14, 15 Meter Rows (1985), Apollo's Ecstasy (1990), and The 2000 Sculpture (1992).

In 1989 De Maria completed a sphere of polished granite for the Assemblée Nationale in Paris, followed in 2000 and 2004 by works for two museums on Naoshima Island in Japan, the Naoshima Contemporary Art Museum and the Chichu Art Museum. A comparable, 25-ton sculpture entitled Large Red Sphere (2002) was installed in the Türkentor, Munich, in 2010.

One Sun/34 Moons (2002), conceived by the artist in collaboration with architect Steven Holl, was opened 2007 at the Nelson-Atkins Museum of Art, Kansas City. In 2010, The 2000 Sculpture (1992) was the first work of art to inaugurate the Resnick Pavilion at the Los Angeles County Museum of Art.

== Exhibitions ==
De Maria and Robert Whitman opened the 9 Great Jones Street gallery in New York in 1963; the same year, De Maria's first solo show of sculpture was presented there. He had his first solo exhibition in a commercial gallery in 1965, at the Paula Johnson Gallery on New York's Upper East Side. (Its owner soon became better known with the Paula Cooper Gallery)

De Maria avoided participating in museum shows when he could, preferring to create his installations outdoors or at unconventional urban locations. His work was more widely shown outside the United States, and he had major exhibitions in Japan and Europe.

In 1968 and 1977, De Maria participated in Documenta in Kassel; he installed his permanent public sculpture Vertical Earth Kilometer in the city's Friedrichsplatz Park. In 1977, a major exhibition of De Maria's sculpture was held at the Kunstmuseum Basel in 1972. He has also since been the subject of numerous solo exhibitions organized by Centre Georges Pompidou in Paris (1981), Museum Boymans-van Beuningen in Rotterdam (1984), Staatsgalerie in Stuttgart (1987), Moderna Museet in Stockholm (1988), Gemäldegalerie in Berlin (1998), and Chichu Art Museum in Naoshima (2000 and 2004). Organized by the Menil Collection in 2011, "Walter De Maria: Trilogies" was the artist's first major museum exhibition in the United States.

== Films ==
In 2015, filmmaker and art historian James Crump produced and directed Troublemakers: The Story of Land Art. Set in the desolate desert spaces of the American southwest, this feature documentary film contains rare footage of De Maria and the artist's extant and non-extant works. Troublemakers was one of twelve documentary films selected by the 53rd New York Film Festival, September 25 – October 11, 2015. The film released theatrically at IFC Center, New York, January 8, 2016.

== Literature ==
- Kellein, Thomas (1987). Walter de Maria: 5 Kontinente Skulptur, mit Essays zum Werk des Künstlers (exhibition catalogue) (in German). Staatsgalerie Stuttgart. Stuttgart, Germany: Hatje. ISBN 978-3775702881.
- Walter De Maria: Trilogies, edited by Josef Helfenstein and Clare Elliott. Houston: Menil Collection, 2011. ISBN 9780300175783
- Jane McFadden, Walter De Maria: Meaningless Work. London: Reaktion Books, 2016. ISBN 9781780236674
- Artists on Walter De Maria, edited by Katherine Atkins and Kelly Kivland. New York: Dia Art Foundation, 2017. ISBN 978-0-944521-84-7
- Walter De Maria: The Lightning Field, edited by Stephen Hoban, Alexis Lowry, and Jessica Morgan, photographs by John Cliett. New York: Dia Art Foundation, 2017. ISBN 978-0-94452185-4
- Interview with Paul Cummings, by Walter De Maria, edited by Cerise Fontaine. Paris: Éditions Lutanie, 2019. ISBN 978-2-918685-11-1
