= The Lightning Field =

Land art installation in New Mexico, US

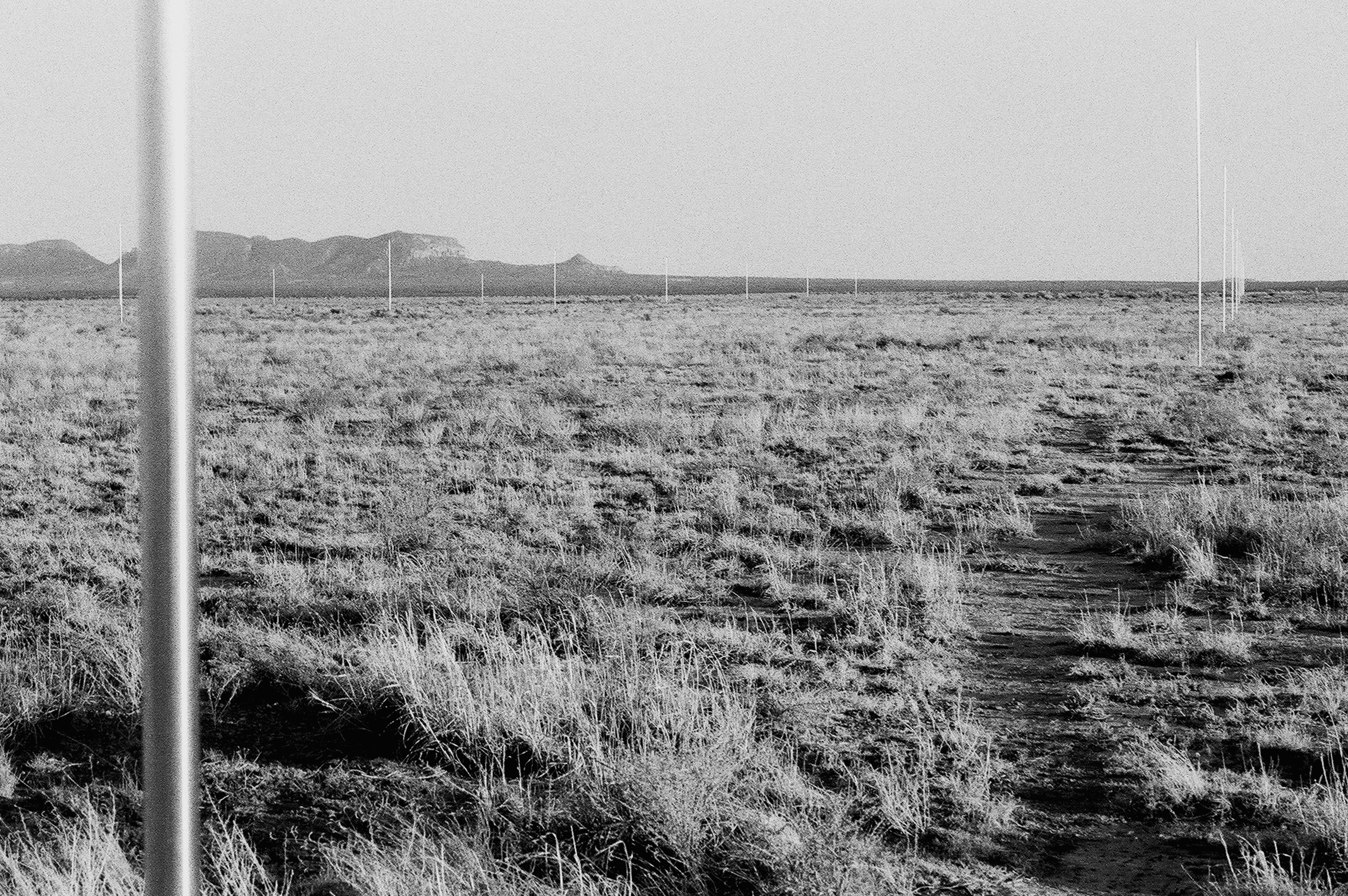
- The Lightning Field in Catron County, New Mexico
- Location of The Lightning Field in New Mexico
- Artist: Walter De Maria
- Year: 1977
- Type: Sculpture
- Medium: Stainless steel
- Movement: Land art
- Dimensions: 1-mile (1.6 km) × 1-kilometre (0.62 mi) grid; 400 poles
- Location: Catron County, New Mexico, United States; 34°31′00″N 108°6′21″W
- Owner: Dia Art Foundation

External image
- Lightning Field, photo by Walter De Maria

The Lightning Field (1977) is a land art work in Catron County, New Mexico, by sculptor Walter De Maria. It consists of 400 stainless steel poles with solid, pointed tips, arranged in a rectangular 1 mile × 1 kilometre grid array. It is maintained by the Dia Art Foundation as one of 12 locations and sites they manage. While the work's title, form, and best-known photographs may suggest the installation attracts lightning strikes, in fact these happen rarely.

== History ==
The work was commissioned by Dia Art Foundation, which now maintains it. De Maria and his assistants Robert Fosdick and Helen Winkler traveled around California, Nevada, Utah, Arizona and Texas by truck for over five years before settling on this site for the large installation. It is 11.5 miles (18.5 km) east of the continental divide, at an elevation of 7,200 feet above sea level.

Set in the middle of an empty plateau about 40 miles from the nearest town, the work consists of 400 stainless steel poles arranged in the form of a grid. The grid measures 1 mile by 1 kilometer, and the poles are set 220 feet apart from one another. Accounting for natural ground-surface variance to create an isocephaly effect, the appearance of a level plane, the two-inch diameter poles were constructed to vary in height from 15 feet to 26 feet 9 inches. Each steel rod is set in its own concrete footing, three feet deep and one foot in diameter, buried one foot beneath the surface. They are designed to survive winds of up to 110 miles (180 km) an hour.

Support for maintaining and operating The Lightning Field is provided in part by an endowment established by Ray A. Graham III and Lannan Foundation, which awarded a challenge grant in 1996. Financial support for the permanent preservation of the undeveloped grasslands surrounding the installation has been provided by Dia's Board of Trustees, the State of New Mexico, De Maria's assistant Helen Winkler Fosdick, and Gucci.

By 2012, the structure as a whole needed reinforcement. To raise the estimated $400,000 needed to preserve Lightning Field, Larry Gagosian, whose gallery represents De Maria, and Miuccia Prada collaborated to lead the restoration effort. Work on the Lightning Field was to begin in early 2013, and the sculpture was to be reopened in June.

== Representation in other media ==
A photograph of The Lightning Field was used as the cover image for Robert Hughes's 1997 book, American Visions: The Epic History of Art in America. The work featured prominently in the novel Blinded by the Light by Morgan Hunt. It may have influenced the imagery of author Cormac McCarthy's epilogue in his book Blood Meridian.

It is the subject of "Poles Apart" (2011), a New Yorker article by Geoff Dyer. David Ulin discusses the work as a narrative which "unfolds not as a fixed encounter but rather as something that gets inside us in a more sequential way." It inspired composer John Mackey's piece which he entitled "The Lightning Field".

== Visiting ==
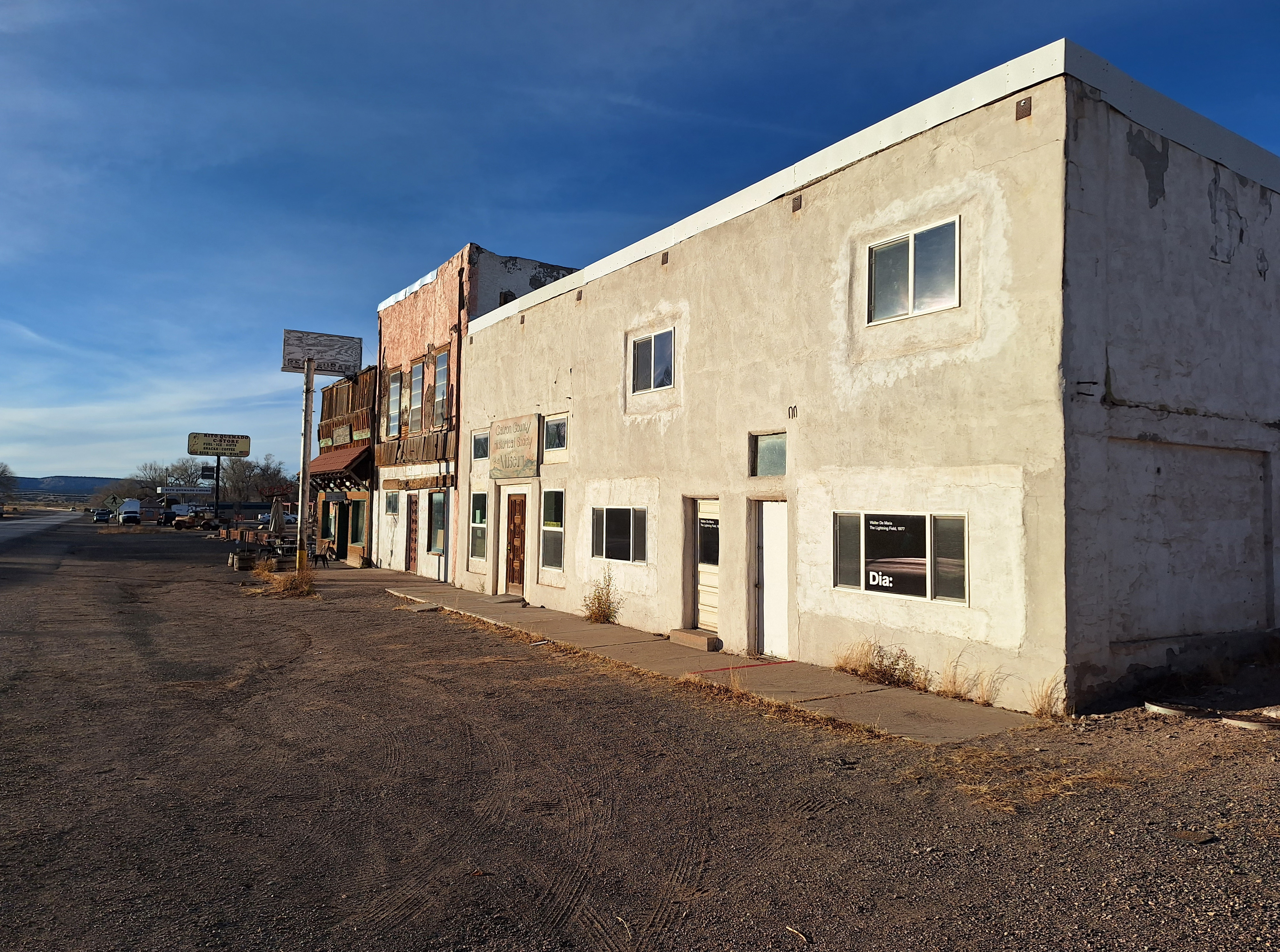
The Dia field office in Quemado, New Mexico is responsible for administering The Lightning Field.

Open for six months of the year, the installation can be visited only by making advance reservations that include an overnight stay in the accommodations at the site. The site is a long drive from a scheduled meeting place in Quemado to a log cabin in the area.

The installation is intended to be viewed in isolation or with a very small group of people. A cabin on the site was restored to accommodate up to six people for this purpose. It has two bathrooms, a kitchen, and a common room. Camping at the site is not permitted.

== See also ==
- Utah monolith
