= Muzaffer Ozak =

19th Grand Sheikh of the Halveti-Jerrahi Order

Personal life
- Born: 1916 Karagümrük, Istanbul, Ottoman Empire
- Died: 13 February 1985 (aged 68–69) Istanbul, Turkey
- Notable works: Irshad, Visdom of a Sufi Master; Adornment of Hearts; Ashki's Divan; The Unveiling of Love; Blessed Virgin Mary; The Garden of Dervishes

Religious life
- Religion: Islam
- Denomination: Sunni
- Jurisprudence: Hanafi
- Tariqa: Jerrahi
- Creed: Maturidi

Muslim leader
- Disciple of: Abdurrahman Sami Pasha

Military service
- Website: muzafferozak.com

Muzaffer Ozak (formally: Sheikh Muzaffer Özak Âșkî al-Jerrahi) (1916 – 12 February 1985) was a Turkish Muslim spiritual author, imam, and the 19th Grand Sheikh of the Halveti-Jerrahi Order of Dervishes, a traditional Ottoman Sufi order based in Istanbul, Turkey. He served in the position from 1966 to 1985, becoming revered in Western countries because of his visits through Europe and the United States of America, where he celebrated public zikr ceremonies with his dervishes. He is also well known in Turkey for his ilahis, Sufi religious hymns. Ozak also ran a small shop in the historic book bazaar, Sahaflar Çarşısı, that still serves the community today.

Ozak's most prominent disciples and successors in North America were Tosun Bayrak, Lex Hixon, and Philippa de Menil. Following Ozak's death, the tariqa was split into the Nur Ashki Jerrahi Sufi Order and the Jerrahi Order of America, with the former reflecting a more "universalistic" orientation, and the latter a more "traditional" one. Ozak consciously fostered different interpretations of his teachings while also showing it was not his intention to have the Halveti-Jerrahi Order separated. Moreover, he grew to embrace the more adaptive interpretations of his message over the more conservative, yet still legitimate perspective of traditionalists.

Ozak's immediate predecessor as Grand Sheikh was Ibrahim Fahreddin (1885–1966), who was the 18th Grand Sheikh of the Order from 1914 to 1966. His immediate successor as Grand Sheikh was Sefer Dal (1926–1999), who was the 20th Grand Sheikh of the Order from 1985 to 1999. Ozak's most prominent disciple and successor in Turkey was Ömer Tuğrul İnançer (1946–2022), who had been the 21st Grand Sheikh of the Halveti-Jerrahi Order since 1999 when he oversaw the activities of the community from their three hundred year old tekke in Fatih, Istanbul.

== Works ==
- Irşad
  - English: Irshad – Wisdom of a Sufi Master
- Aşk Yolu Vuslat Tariki
  - English: The Unveiling of Love
  - Spanish: La Develación del Amor
- Envar-ül-Kulub
  - English: Lights of the Hearts
- Ziynet-ül-Kulub
  - English: Adornment of Hearts
- Gülsar-i Arifan
- Hazret-i Meryem (not published in Turkish)
  - English: Blessed Virgin Mary
  - German: Die gesegnete Jungfrau Maria im Islam
  - Spanish: Mariam
- Sofiyye Sohbetleri (not published in Turkish)
  - English: Garden of Dervishes
- Love is the Wine (edited by Robert Frager)
  - German: Der Wein der Sufis (zusammengestellt von Robert Frager)
    - (Title of first edition: Liebe ist der Wein)
  - Spanish: El Amor es el Vino (recompilado por R. Frager)

== Audiorecordings ==
- LP Halveti-Jerrahi-Dhikr
  - Journey To The Lord Of Power
- CD Chant des Derviches de Turquie
  - La Cérémonie du Zikr
  - (5. Festival des Arts Traditionnels 1978, Rennes, France)
- CD Garden of Paradise
  - Sufi Ceremony of Remembrance
  - (recorded April 5, 1983 in Istanbul, Turkey)
- CD Reunion
  - Ceremonial Music of the Sufis
  - (recorded April 16, 1984 in New York City, USA)

== See also ==
- Jerrahi
- Nur Ashki Jerrahi
