= Jerrahi =

Turkish Sufi mystic order in Islam

The Jerrahi (Turkish: Cerrahiyye, Cerrahilik) are a Sufi tariqah (order) derived from the Halveti order. Their founder is Hazreti Pîr Muhammad Nureddin al-Jerrahi (1678-1720), who lived in Istanbul and is buried at the site of his tekke in Karagümrük, Istanbul. Nureddin was a direct descendant of Hazrat Syedna Muhammad ﷺ both from his mother and father. During the Late Ottoman period, the Order was widespread throughout the Balkans, particularly Macedonia and southern Greece (Morea). The Jerrahi Order of Dervishes is a cultural, educational, and social relief organization with members from diverse professional, ethnic and national backgrounds.

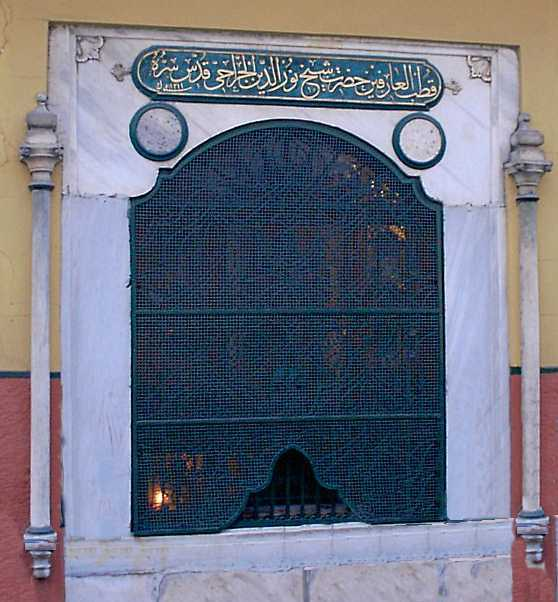
Türbe of the sufi Nur al-Din al-Jarrāhī in Istanbul

The head dergah "convention" of the Halveti-Jerrahi Order is in Karagümrük, Fatih, Istanbul. There are some substations in Turkey and it has branches in some European countries, Australia, South Africa, South America and North America, including Los Angeles, New York City, Mexico, San Francisco, Toronto and Chicago. Branches of the Halveti-Jerrahi Order conduct gatherings where the dervishes perform Sufi remembrance ceremonies, practice sufi music, serve dinner, pray together and listen to the discourses of their Sufi guides. The main branch of the Jerrahi Order of America is in Chestnut Ridge, Rockland County, New York with a congregation of mixed immigrant and local convert backgrounds.

== History ==
This Sufi Order was brought to Western countries by Muzaffer Ozak, who was the 19th Grand Sheikh of the Order from 1966 until his death in 1985. Sefer Dal was Grand Sheikh of the Order from 1985 until his own death in 1999. Ömer Tuğrul İnançer was Grand Sheikh of the Order from 1999 to 2022. The current Sheikh of the Order since 2022 is Ahmet Özhan. According to Gift of the Givers founder Imtiaz Sooliman, it was Sefer Dal, 20th Grand Sheikh of the Order, who advised him to establish the organization during a visit to Dal's Istanbul mosque.

During the Bosnian War, the Order's American branch worked with the Fellowship of Reconciliation to bring 160 Bosnian refugees to the US. Inancer, the previous Grand Sheikh of the Order, was a speaker at the World Sufi Forum organized by the All India Ulema and Mashaikh Board in 2016.

== See also ==
- Muzaffer Ozak
- Nur Ashki Jerrahi Sufi Order
- Malamatiyya
- Mevlevi Order
- Bektashiyyah
- Bayramiyya
