= Aydın Dikmen =

Turkish art thief (1937–2020)

Aydın Dikmen (born October 15, 1937 – April 8, 2020) was a Turkish art dealer who was arrested in 1998 for trying to sell Eastern Orthodox art that had been looted from Cyprus during the 1974 invasion.

During the Turkish invasion of northern Cyprus in 1974, some of the churches and monasteries in the area were looted for art treasures. He is responsible of looting over 50 Greek Orthodox, Armenian and Maronite monuments as well as archaeological sites and private collections. Among the looted artefacts are mosaics, frescoes, manuscripts, icons, doors and prehistoric artefacts. Greek Cypriot authorities now suspect that Dikmen had a major part of stripping the churches of their treasures or at least selling them.

Dikmen sold thirteenth-century frescoes from the St. Evphemianos church near Lysi, Cyprus, to the Menil Foundation in Houston, Texas, in 1984. The Cypriot church approved the deal providing that the frescoes would be returned to Cyprus eventually.

In 1988 Dikmen, Dutch art dealer Michel van Rijn and associate Robert Fitzgerald sold four church mosaics taken from Panagia Kanakaria in Lythrangomi to US dealer Peg Goldberg for $1 million. When she tried to sell them to the J. Paul Getty Museum in California, the museum curator contacted Greek Cypriot authorities. After a 1989 trial a federal court in Indianapolis ordered them to be returned to the Greek Orthodox Church in Cyprus. They currently reside in the Byzantine Museum in Cyprus.

In March 1998, after an eight-month sting operation initiated by Tasoula Hadjitofi, Honorary Consul of Cyprus in The Netherlands, Munich police recovered more treasures from apartments Dikmen had rented with a false names. Dikmen was arrested after he was videotaped when he tried to sell the treasures. Michel van Rijn cooperated with the police but later refused to testify against Dikmen after he had received death threats.

The returned loot included 30 frescoes from the Antifonitis monastery, a mosaic from Kanakaria church and a number of icons. They were taken to the Bavarian National Museum for safekeeping before being returned to Cyprus.

In July 2024 the last 60 looted antiquities were returned to Cyprus from Germany after an agreement between the two countries. The artefacts are 24 ecclesiastical relics and 36 prehistoric and other antiquities.
