= Michael Govan =

American art director

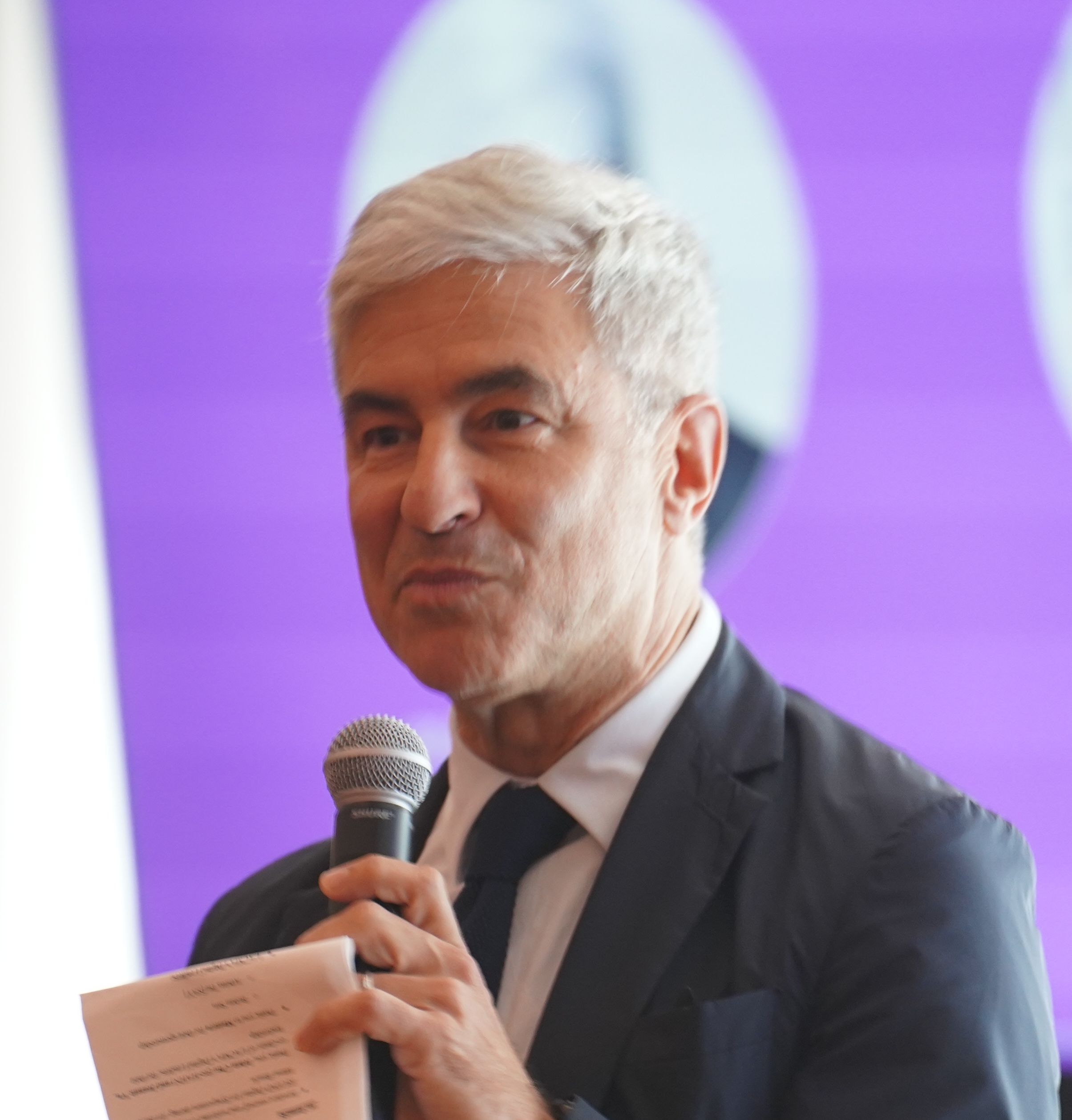
- Michael Govan at Art Basel Miami Beach 2025

CEO and Wallis Annenberg Director of the Los Angeles County Museum of Art
- In office 2006–Present
- Preceded by: Earl A. Powell III

President and director of the Dia Art Foundation
- In office 1994–2006
- Preceded by: Charles Wright
- Succeeded by: Jeffrey Weiss

Personal details
- Born: 1963 (age 62–63) North Adams, Massachusetts, U.S.
- Spouse: Katherine Ross
- Children: 2
- Parents: James "Jim" Govan (father); Emilia Govan (mother)
- Education: Williams College (BA)
- Occupation: Museum director

Michael Govan (born 1963) is the CEO and Wallis Annenberg Director of the Los Angeles County Museum of Art. Previously, he was president and director of the Dia Art Foundation, and deputy director of the Guggenheim Museum in New York City.

== Early life and education ==
Govan was born in 1963 in North Adams, Massachusetts, and raised in Arlington, Virginia, near Washington, D.C. His parents, Emilia and Jim Govan, are noted art collectors of creches. As a child, his parents were leaders of the Arlington Coalition on Transportation, a neighborhood group that protested the creation of Interstate 66, a connector between Northern Virginia and D.C.

For elementary school, Govan and his brother attended the parish school in Arlington. In middle school, he won an art contest. In ninth grade, he was admitted to Sidwell Friends School, and his art portfolio was recognized by an art teacher at the school. He graduated from Sidwell Friends in 1981.

He majored in art history and fine arts at Williams College, where he met Thomas Krens, who was then director of the Williams College Museum of Art. Govan became closely involved with the museum, serving as acting curator as an undergraduate and designing museum collateral, including catalogues, logos, and exhibition posters. He graduated with a B.A. from Williams in 1985, and for his senior thesis he created a "conceptual exhibition in which he reversed the dynamic of paintings and catalogue." For graduate school, Govan attended the University of California, San Diego. In 1988, he dropped out of graduate school to take a job working with Krens at the Guggenheim Museum.

== Career ==
In 1988, Govan's mentor at Williams, Thomas Krens, was appointed director of the Guggenheim Museum. Govan at age 25 served as Krens' deputy director for six and a half years, a period that culminated in the construction and opening of the Frank Gehry designed Guggenheim branch in Bilbao, Spain. Govan supervised the reinstallation of the Guggenheim Bilbao museum's permanent collection galleries after its extensive renovation.

=== Dia Art Foundation ===
From 1994 to 2006, Govan was president and director of Dia Art Foundation in New York City. There, he spearheaded the conversion of a Nabisco box factory into the 300,000 square foot Dia:Beacon in New York's Hudson Valley, which houses Dia's collection of art from the 1960s to the present. Built in a former Nabisco box factory (Govan actually spotted this building while piloting on a small engine plane flight from New York City to visit MASS MoCA), the critically acclaimed museum has been credited with catalyzing a cultural and economic revival within the formerly factory-based city of Beacon. Dia's collection nearly doubled in size during Govan's tenure, but he also came under criticism for "needlessly and permanently" closing Dia's West 22nd Street building. During his time at Dia, Govan also worked closely with artists James Turrell and Michael Heizer, becoming an ardent supporter of Roden Crater and City, the artists' respective site-specific land art projects under construction in the American southwest. Govan successfully lobbied Washington to have the 704,000 acres in central Nevada surrounding City declared a national monument in 2015.

=== LACMA ===
In February 2006, a search committee composed of eleven LACMA trustees, led by the late Nancy M. Daly, recruited Govan to run the Los Angeles County Museum of Art after ten people turned down the position. Govan has stated that he was drawn to the role not only because of LACMA's geographical distance from its European and east coast peers, but also because of the museum's relative youth, having been established in 1961. "I felt that because of this newness I had the opportunity to reconsider the museum," Govan has written, "[and] Los Angeles is a good place to do that." Govan goes on to say about deciding to come to LACMA, “ I had spent so much time by then thinking about the anti-museum, about artists, time, history, and traveling the world. The encyclopedic museum still felt problematic to me.Rem Koolhaas had suggested in 2001 that you needed to tear LACMA down because it didn’t work seismically. It was too expensive to renovate. I talked with my artist friends who were from L.A. I took a deep breath and thought, This is the only city. It’s the new city. It speaks 200 languages. It sits on the Pacific Rim between Asia and Latin America. It’s the media capital.”

Govan has been widely regarded for transforming LACMA into both a local and international landmark. Since Govan's arrival, LACMA has acquired by donation or purchase over 27,000 works for the permanent collection, and the museum's gallery space has almost doubled thanks to the addition of two new buildings designed by Renzo Piano, the Broad Contemporary Art Museum (BCAM) and the Lynda and Stewart Resnick Pavilion. LACMA's annual attendance has grown from 600,000 to nearly 1.6 million in 2016.

In 2024 Govan earned $1,947,721 million dollars from LACMA - Museum Associates making him one of the highest paid museum directors in the world and the highest in the US after the recent departure of Glen Lowry at MoMA.

On November 5, 2025, Govan and the LACMA board declined to voluntarily recognize the union LACMA UNITED in association with AFSCME Cultural Workers United District Council 36 employees announced they were forming October 29, 2025. This means LACMA United cannot move forward with collective bargaining efforts until it is formalized by a National Labor Relations Board election. Also on November 5, 2025 Govan called for a general all staff secret ballot election for approval of the union at LACMA the date has yet to be set for the election.

==== Artist collaborations ====
Since his arrival, Govan has commissioned exhibition scenography and gallery designs in collaboration with artists. In 2006, for example, Govan invited LA artist John Baldessari to design an upcoming exhibition about the Belgian surrealist René Magritte, resulting in a theatrical show that reflected the twisted perspective of the latter's topsy-turvy world. Baldessari has also designed LACMA's logo. Since then, Govan has also commissioned Cuban-American artist Jorge Pardo to design LACMA's Art of the Ancient Americas gallery, described in the Los Angeles Times as a "gritty cavern deep inside the earth ... crossed with a high-style urban lounge."

Govan has also commissioned several large-scale public artworks for LACMA's campus from contemporary California artists. These include Chris Burden's Urban Light (2008), a series of 202 vintage street lamps from different neighborhoods in Los Angeles, arranged in front of the entrance pavilion, Barbara Kruger's Untitled (Shafted) (2008), Robert Irwin's Primal Palm Garden (2010), and Michael Heizer's Levitated Mass, a 340-ton boulder transported 100 miles from the Jurupa Valley to LACMA, a widely publicized journey that culminated with a large celebration on Wilshire Boulevard. Thanks in part to the popularity of these public artworks, LACMA was ranked the fourth most instagrammed museum in the world in 2016.

In his first three full years, the museum raised $251 million—about $100 million more than it collected during the three years before he arrived. In 2010, it was announced that Govan will steer LACMA for at least six more years. In a letter dated February 24, 2013, Govan, along with the LACMA board's co-chairmen Terry Semel and Andrew Gordon, proposed a merger with the financially troubled Museum of Contemporary Art, Los Angeles and a plan to raise $100 million for the combined museum. In March 2013 the MOCA Board of Trustees turned down an offer from LACMA to merge with the art museum, saying instead they'd prefer to remain an independent institution.

==== Zumthor Project - David Geffen Galleries ====
Govan's latest project is an ambitious building project, the replacement of four of the campus's aging buildings with a single new state of the art gallery building designed by architect Peter Zumthor. As of January 2017, he has raised about $300 million in commitments. Construction began in 2018, and the new building will open in April 2026, to coincide with the opening of the new D Line metro stop on Wilshire Boulevard which might open in winter of 2026.

The project also envisages dissolving all existing curatorial departments and departmental collections. Govan’s approach towards the new building quoted, “I was talking with Peter, and one of the problems with the encyclopedic museum is that it uses a Cartesian, God’s-eye-view time-space grid. It’s the grid that allows colonialism to map and conquer the world. Many cultures have other models of time—models that are circular. Glissant talks about travel and about discarding. There are so many references. But the Cartesian space has to be broken in order to decolonize art history. The time-space grid is the issue. Peter’s work uses other principles: unconscious memory, materiality, ephemerality, shadow—not light. In Praise of Shadows. All of these tools in his building practice undermine the idea of a Cartesian order. I mean, unconsciousness is just one way to look at it. I’m not even sure that’s the right word. But I knew he had the ability—especially when you’re staring at the La Brea Tar Pits. You’re kind of staring into the darkness of... At the time, I remember Werner Herzog made that movie about the Chauvet caves(“Cave of Forgotten Dreams” c.2011 ), the 35,000-year-old cave paintings that look a little like Picasso—but they’re proto-cinema. They’re the same animals that are in the Le Brea Tar Pits. And you start to realize: the Tar Pits aren’t prehistory. They’re coincident with art history. You’re staring into this Ice Age—the origins of human creativity. If you have to smash up the Cartesian space grid, this is a damn good place to do it.”

Some commentators have been highly critical of Govan's plans. Joseph Giovannini, recalling Govan's technically unrealizable onetime plan to hang Jeff Koons' Train sculpture from the facade of the Ahmanson Gallery, has accused Govan of "driving the institution over a cliff into an equivalent mid-air wreck of its own". Describing the collection merging proposal as the creation of a "giant raffle bowl of some 130,000 objects", Giovannini also points out that the Zumthor building will contain 33% less gallery space than the galleries it will replace, and that the linear footage of wall space available for displays will decrease by about 7,500 ft, or 1.5 miles. Faced with losing a building named in its honor, and anticipating that its acquisitions could no longer be displayed, the Ahmanson Foundation withdrew its support. On the merging of the separate curatorial divisions to create a non-departmental art museum, Christopher Knight (LA Times Art Critic) has pointed out that "no other museum of LACMA's size and complexity does it" that way, and characterized the museum's 2019 "To Rome and Back" exhibition, the first to take place under the new scheme, as "bland and ineffectual" and an "unsuccessful sample of what's to come". The monolithic concrete structure, which has been compared with a freeway overpass and an “amoebic pancake”, was built to replace four older Lacma buildings, which were torn down to make room for the stylish newcomer. The building will hold a rotating selection from Lacma’s permanent collection of more than 150,000 art objects from around the globe. As the estimated cost of the project rose by nearly $100m, Zumthor, the star architect, publicly distanced himself from the results, saying he had repeatedly been forced to “reduce” his design, and that the experience had convinced him to never again work in the US. The space was designed to be “non-hierarchical”, Govan said. He did not want to organize the museum’s permanent collection by time period or geography or type of art: he recalled telling Zumthor that “I don’t want anyone in the front.” “The building itself really avoids linear histories or linear paths,” Govan said. “The remit was to make something that was more like wandering in a park, where you curate your own journey.” When the gallery opens in 2026, Govan said, the first show will be organized around the “muse” of four different oceans, including a mix of Mediterranean art, and a Pacific collection that brings together California artists with those from Japan. Brad Pitt showed up to a LA County Board of Supervisors public meeting in 2019 to praise Zumthor’s “mastery of light and shadow”, and spoke in favor of the new Lacma building for so long that an elected official told him to “wrap it up”. Christopher Knight urged the Los Angeles County Board of Supervisors not to approve the environmental report or release the $117.5 million in county funds to what he considered to be an ill-considered and over-priced design. (The project has a higher price per square foot than comparable museum projects in recent years.) The David Geffen Galleries is scheduled to open in April 2026.

== Personal life ==
Govan is married to Katherine Ross and has two daughters both involved in the arts, one from a previous marriage. He and his family used to live in a $6 million mansion in Hancock Park that was provided by LACMA - a benefit worth $155,000 a year, according to most recent tax filings - until LACMA decided that it would sell the property to make up for the museum's almost $900 million in debt . That home is now worth nearly $8 million and Govan now lives in a one story one bedroom home in the Baldwin Hills neighborhood of Los Angeles “designed in 1958 by the mid-century California architect Ray Kappe, it’s perched on a hillside, like a bird in flight, and its floor-to-ceiling windows overlook a significant swath of the city, from the Getty to the Hollywood sign to the soon-to-open Lucas Museum of Narrative Art.” He and his wife also own a mobile home in Malibu’s Point Dume area. He has had a private pilot's license since 1995 and keeps a 1979 Beechcraft Bonanza at Santa Monica Airport. Since 2004 Govan has owned a vacation home in East Hampton on Long Island, New York the home (Initial construction was by David G. Rattray, the late poet and editor who died there in 1993) is currently listed for sale for $3.8 million dollars.”
