= Tasoulas =

Tasoulas is a given name and a surname. Notable people with the name include:

- Tasoula Hadjitofi (born 1959), Cypriot cultural heritage advocate, anti-corruption campaigner, entrepreneur, NGO founder, author, and former Honorary Consul of Cyprus in the Netherlands
- Konstantinos Tasoulas (born 1959), Greek politician and lawyer
