= Arthur Brand (investigator) =

Dutch art crime investigator

Arthur Brand (born 1968 or 1969) is a Dutch art crime investigator who has recovered over 200 works of art. His vocation is being an art historian and art consultant. It is for the love of art that he takes on lost art recovery as a personal interest.

Brand's interest in stolen art recovery began when he was an exchange student in southern Spain. Together with some Romani people he met there, he went on a treasure hunt that resulted in the discovery of three silver Roman coins. He was inspired by that journey to begin conducting detective work on his own. He conducted research through newspapers to learn about stolen works of art.

In 2002 Brand met Michel van Rijn and over time became his assistant. Brand and Van Rijn had a falling out when Brand was to testify against Leonardo Patterson. Van Rijn reportedly offered him 5,000 euro to not testify with Brand replying he could not be bought off. Brand also stated that Van Rijn had received 25,000 euro from Patterson for Brand's silence. In 2009 Brand started a business of his own.

Amongst other works, he tracked down a 1600-year-old missing mosaic, and a Byzantine-era depiction of St. Mark that was stolen four decades previously. He also helped recover Salvador Dalí’s "Adolescence", during which CBS quoted that "He's described as the Indiana Jones of the art world". Other recovered works include Tamara de Lempicka's The Musician. Brand was involved in the pursuit of several paintings that were stolen from the Dutch city of Hoorn. He retrieved Oscar Wilde's ring, returned to Oxford University's Magdalen College, Picasso's Buste de Femme and Van Gogh's The Parsonage Garden at Nuenen in September 2023. Six paintings stolen from the town hall of Medemblik in September 2023 were delivered anonymously to Brand's door in October 2023. In 2026, Brand traced and helped retrieve the Portrait of a Young Girl by Dutch painter Toon Kelder (1894-1973) and a 17th-century painting of the inside of Nieuwe Kerk, Amsterdam, by Hendrick van der Burgh, both were looted from Jacques Goudstikker's collection.

He has written two books about his recoveries (Hitler's Horses and Het verboden Judas-evangelie en de schat van Carchemish) and there is a Dutch documentary series about his recoveries: De Kunstdetective. A third book, De kunstdetective has been announced for publication by Boekerij in June 2024.

== Selected publications ==
- Brand, Arthur (2019). De paarden van Hitler: hoe de kunstdetective zijn sensationeelste ontdekking deed en wereldnieuws werd. Amsterdam: Boekerij. ISBN 9789022583128.
- English edition, translated by Jane Hedley-Prôle: Brand, Arthur (2020). Hitler's horses: the incredible true story of the detective who infiltrated the Nazi underworld. London: Ebury Press. ISBN 978-1529106107.
- Brand, Arthur (2006). Het verboden Judas-evangelie en de schat van Carchemish [The Forbidden Gospel of Judas and the Treasure of Carchemish] (in Dutch). Soesterberg: Aspekt. ISBN 9789059112445.
