= Charmstone (sculpture) =

Sculpture in Houston, Texas, U.S.

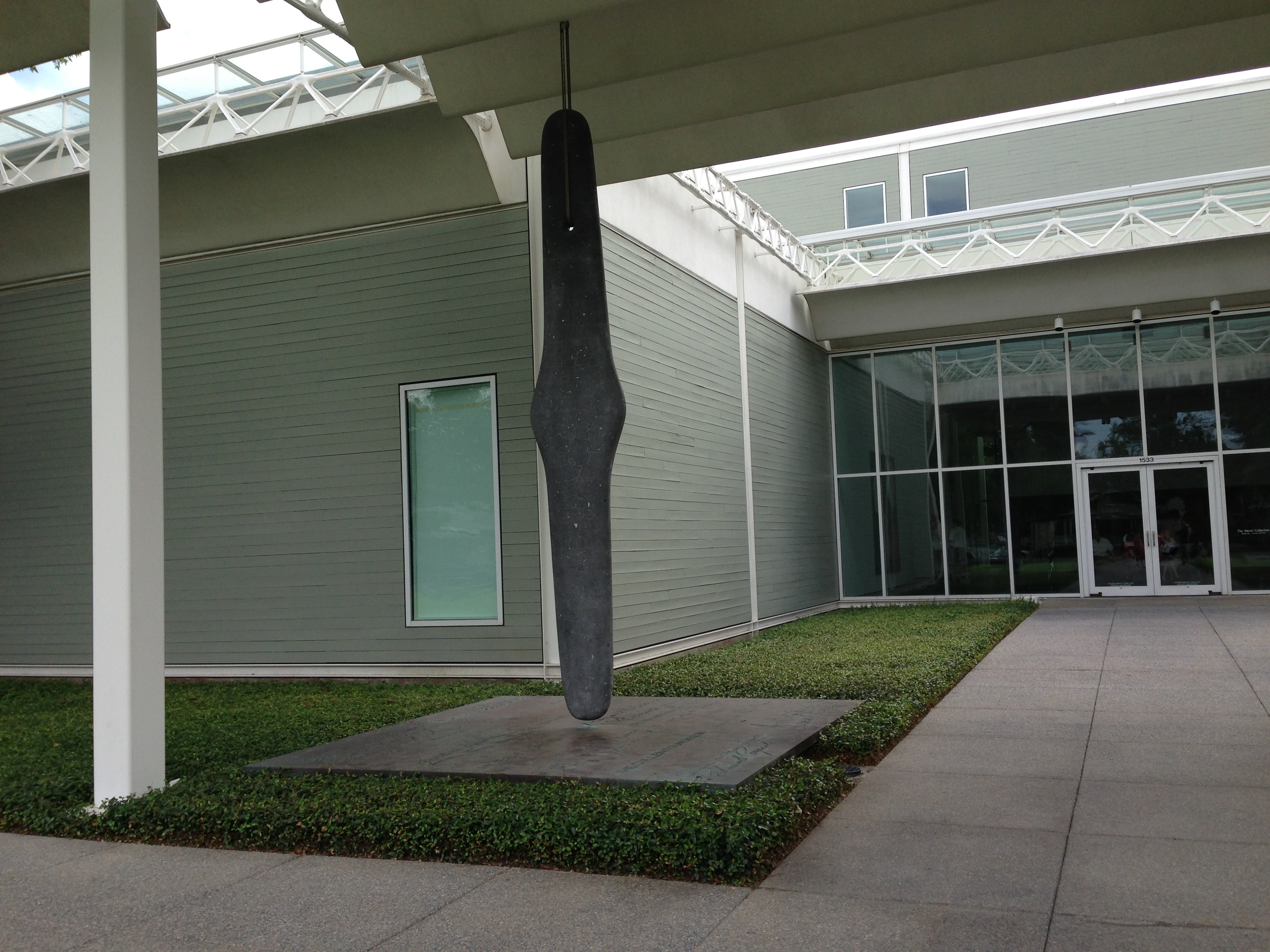
- The sculpture in 2013
- Artist: Michael Heizer
- Year: 1991
- Medium: Modified concrete aggregate
- Dimensions: Sculpture: 15 × 2 ft 3 in × 9 in (457.2 × 68.6 × 22.9 cm); Plaque: 5½ in × 11 × 11 ft (14 × 335.3 × 335.3 cm)
- Location: Houston, Texas, United States
- 29.737485°N 95.398496°W

Charmstone is an oblong hanging sculpture made of modified concrete aggregate that is suspended above a dedication plaque at the entrance to the main building at the Menil Collection. A slight bulge in its center gives the pendant a propeller shape.

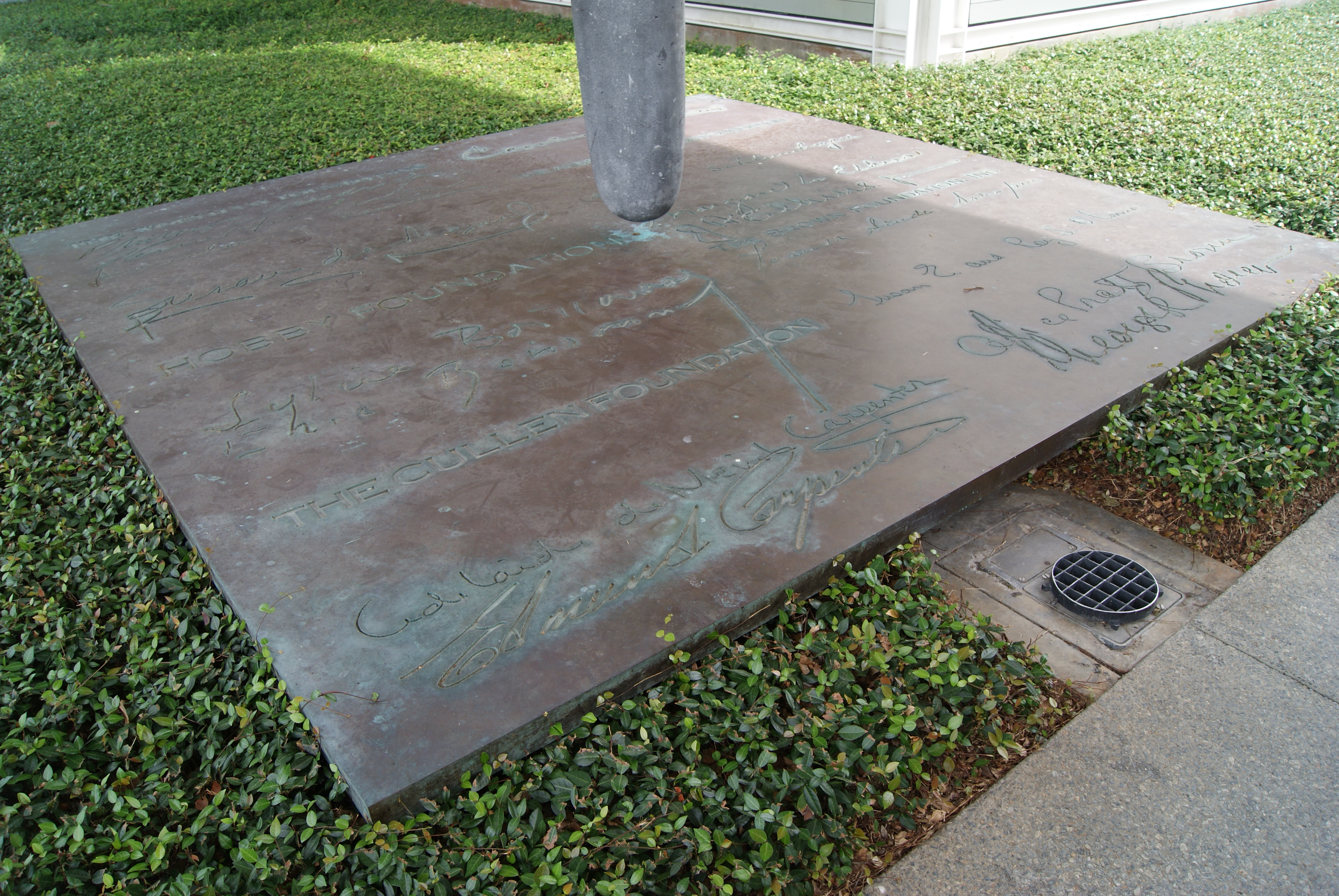
The 11-foot (3.3 m) square dedication plaque below the suspended sculpture

Charmstone was installed at the Menil Collection in 1991. It is one of several with the same name:

- Charmstone 3 (1989) at Waddington Galleries in London
- Charmstone 4 (1990) at Akira Ikeda Gallery in Taura, Japan
- Charmstone (1991) at the Menil Collection

(A Charmstone 2 has not been publicly documented.)

The piece is one of Heizer's "object sculptures," a series inspired by prehistoric objects or tools. He described his motivation for creating "object sculptures" during their first exhibition in 1990:

“They’re simply, in many ways, replicas of these things.... they’re extremely interesting in their original form, and they seem to reoccur in the modern world. I see a lot of aerodynamic shapes in the primitive tool forms, these types of shapes that were internationally used by all people in the early beginnings of mankind. For maybe thousands of years these things were used; so, I’m representing the form, but I’m looking at it again in a new way.... The fact that they existed thousands of years ago does not mean that people have them indexed in their minds as sculptural form. They have them indexed in their mind, if at all, as probably some obscure artifacts put away on a shelf that you walk by every fast in a museum and probably wouldn’t look closely at.”

Charmstones uncovered in archeological digs in California and Southwestern United States are highly polished oblong stones, often with a hole drilled in one end, similar to fishing sinkers. They may have been used for weights, or they may have been sacred objects used for religious or ceremonial purposes. Heizer's father, Robert Heizer, was an archeologist who specialized in California prehistory. He studied charmstones from the Windmiller Culture and created a typology of them; his "Type B and C" typology is very similar to the Charmstones his son created.

== Other works by Michael Heizer in the Houston area ==
In 1968, Heizer made nine excavations in a dry lake bed in Nevada, and this work was titled Nine Nevada Depressions. Dominique de Menil's daughter, Fariha al Jerrahi, commissioned Heizer to reimagined three of the excavations as smaller negative sculptures made with Cor-ten, and these were installed at the Menil Collection:

- Dissipate (1968/1970)
- Isolated Mass / Circumflex (#2) (1968/1978)
- Rift (1968/1982)

Also in Houston, 45° 90° 180° (1984), made of pink granite from Marble Falls, Texas, is in front of the engineering building at Rice University

== See also ==
- List of public art in Houston
