= Byzantine Fresco Chapel =

Museum building in Houston, Texas

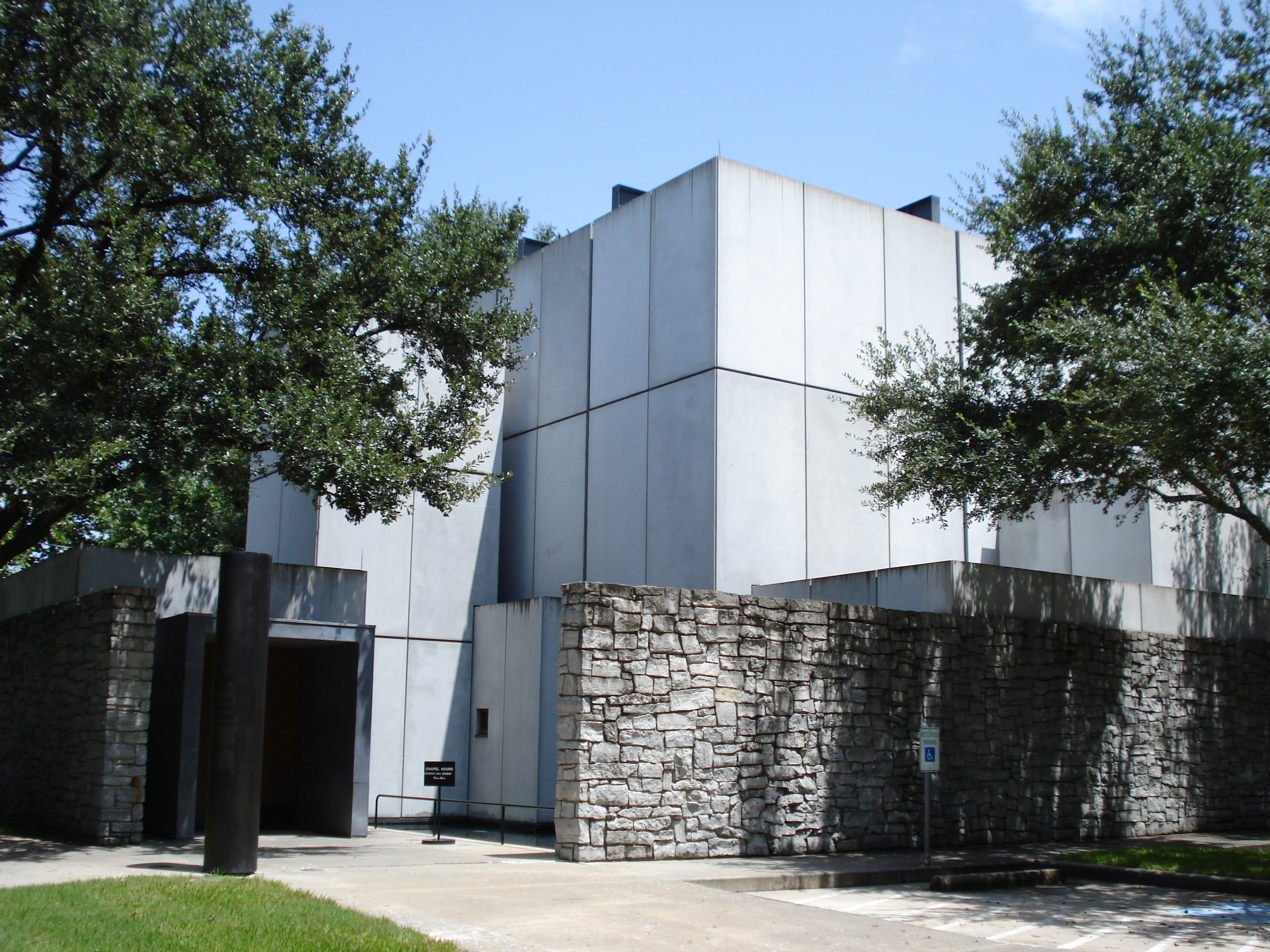
- The exterior of the Byzantine Fresco Chapel in Houston

- Location within Texas Location within the United States
- Established: September 1997, reopened 2015
- Dissolved: 2011
- Location: Houston, Texas, U.S.
- Coordinates: 29.7364°N 95.3953°W
- Website: www.byzantinefrescochapel.org

The Byzantine Fresco Chapel is a part of the Menil Collection in Houston, Texas, near the University of St. Thomas. From February 1997 to February 2012, it displayed the only intact Byzantine frescoes of this size and importance in the western hemisphere. The Byzantine frescoes had been taken from the church of St. Evphemianos in Lysi, Cyprus in the 1980s. In September 2011, the collection announced that the frescos would be permanently returned to Cyprus in February 2012, following the conclusion of a long-term loan agreement with the Greek Orthodox Church of Cyprus. The frescoes had been presented at the museum by agreement with the Church of Cyprus, their owners, but the church decided not to extend the loan further. They will not return to their original home as Lysi is now in Northern Cyprus, but will be displayed at the Byzantine Museum in Nicosia. On March 4, 2012, the Byzantine Fresco Chapel closed, but re-opened in 2015 for the first in a series of site-specific projects.

== History ==
The chapel was opened in February 1997, and displayed masterworks from the 13th century—a dome with Christ Pantocrator and an apse depicting the Virgin Mary, the Panagia. The frescoes had been stolen from a chapel near Lysi in the Turkish-occupied section of Cyprus in the 1980s, cut into 38 pieces, and shipped to Germany by thieves to sell them in the arts black-market. The 38 fresco fragments were bought from the thieves by the Houston-based Menil Foundation on behalf of the Church of Cyprus, the rightful owner of the frescoes. The Menil Foundation then funded a careful restoration of the paintings. These intact frescoes were unique in the western hemisphere.

== The original collection ==
The major part of the collection consisted of the frescoes of the dome and apse. According to the guide to the museum, "the Lysi dome represents Christ Pantokrator, 'All sovereign'. It defines a space with no beginning and no end." The depiction of Christ gazing directly forward "has driven time out of space. His gaze is transworldly: not looking but all-seeing." By not depicting the Lord below the bust, he is "universal and ubiquitous." Surrounding the figure of Christ is a double row of angels moving towards the throne prepared by God the Father for the Second Coming of Christ. The throne is guarded by the Archangel Michael and Archangel Gabriel and two seraphim. The Virgin Mary leads one line of angels to the throne, while John the Baptist leads the other.

In the apse, the Virgin was depicted as flanked by the two archangels with a medallion on her breast of the infant Christ, symbolizing the Incarnation of Christ.

== Later exhibits ==
Later exhibits in the Chapel have included The Infinity Machine. This rotating work by Janet Cardiff and George Bures Miller incorporates an array of antique mirrors suspended from above, accompanied by sonic elements made from NASA recordings of solar winds interacting with planetary ionospheres.

== Architecture ==
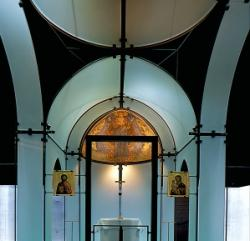
Church within a Museum; the glass and wood chapel that housed the only intact Byzantine frescoes in the Western hemisphere

The 4,000-square-foot (370 m^{2}) $4 million building was designed by architect François de Menil. The interior combines rough stone, opaque glass, and rich woods, to create a space that is both art museum and spiritual space. The suspended-glass "walls" are not replicas of the chapel that the frescoes were removed from, but created a new context for displaying the icons. In order not to simply replicate the original chapel, de Menil designed "a mediating external building with an embedded steel structure – a 'reliquary box' – which forms a neutral enclosure for a freestanding chapel," according to Christine Slessor in The Architectural Review.

"The Byzantine Chapel Museum is a religious building whose purpose is to restore spiritual significance and function to two thirteenth-century Byzantine Frescoes, a dome and an apse, rescued and restored by the owner ... The materiality of the original chapel is shattered and made ephemeral through the fragmented, freestanding sandblasted laminated glass structure which is an abstracted evocation of the original chapel. The infinite is evoked through the play of darkness and light." François de Menil, May 1997

The Byzantine chapel is oriented to face the cardinal directions – the facades face directly north, south, east and west. The enclosed space measures approximately 116,000 cubic feet (3,300 m^{3}). There are no windows on the surface area of the building, except for a skylight of 1,012 square feet (94.0 m^{2}) of clear, double glazed glass, which permits natural light to pervade the interior. A rough limestone wall on the outside of the building evoked the rough construction of the original chapel in Cyprus.

== See also ==
- John de Menil
- Dominique de Menil
