= Church of St. Euphemianos =

Coordinates: 35.0857°N 33.6647°E

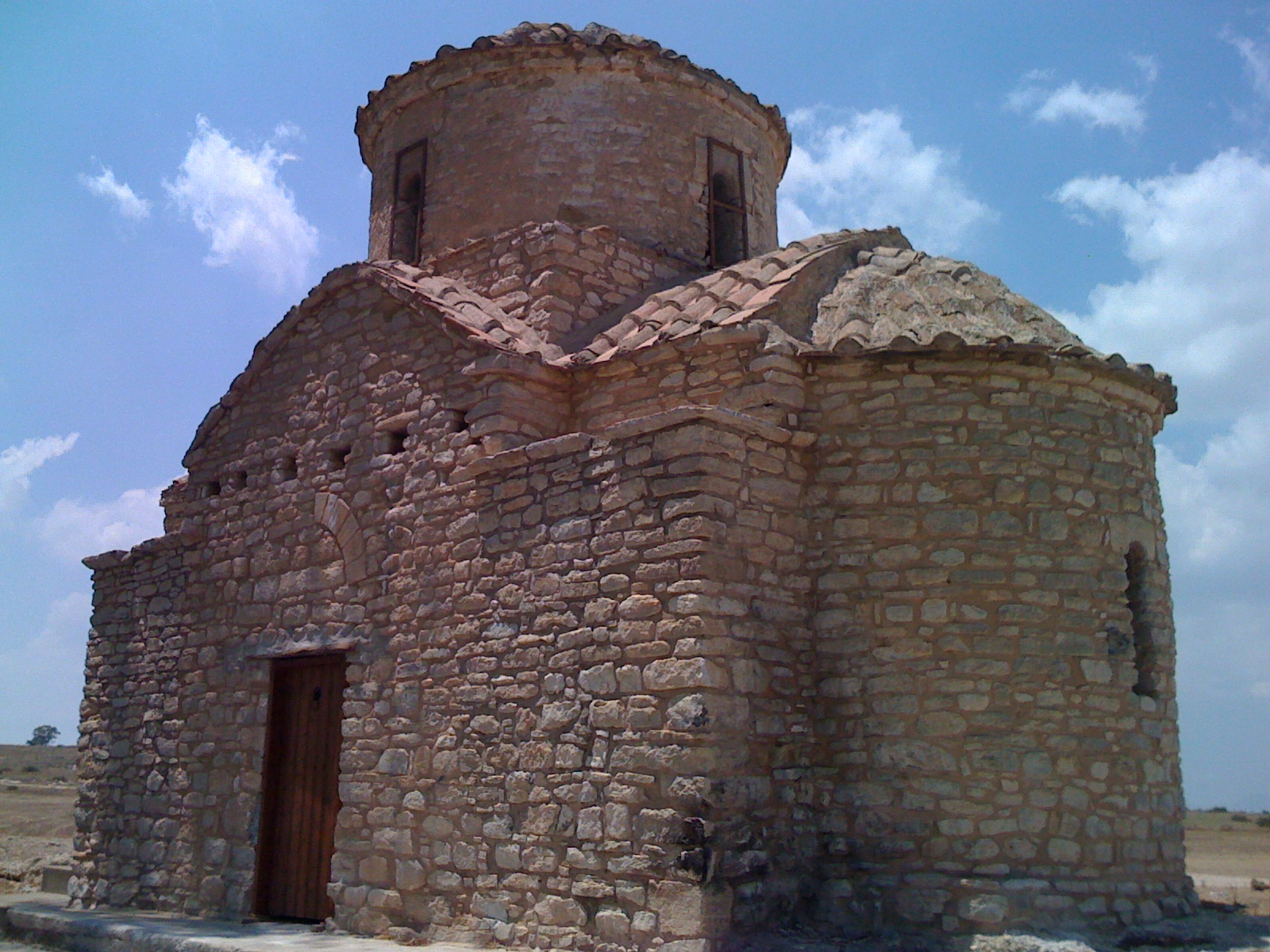
- Church of St. Euphemianos in Lysi, Cyprus (June 2010)
- Church of St. Euphemianos
- Location: Lysi
- Country: Cyprus
- Denomination: Greek Orthodox

History
- Founded: ca. 13th Century
- Dedication: Lavrentios, monk and abbot of St. Andronikos Monastery

Architecture
- Style: Byzantine architecture

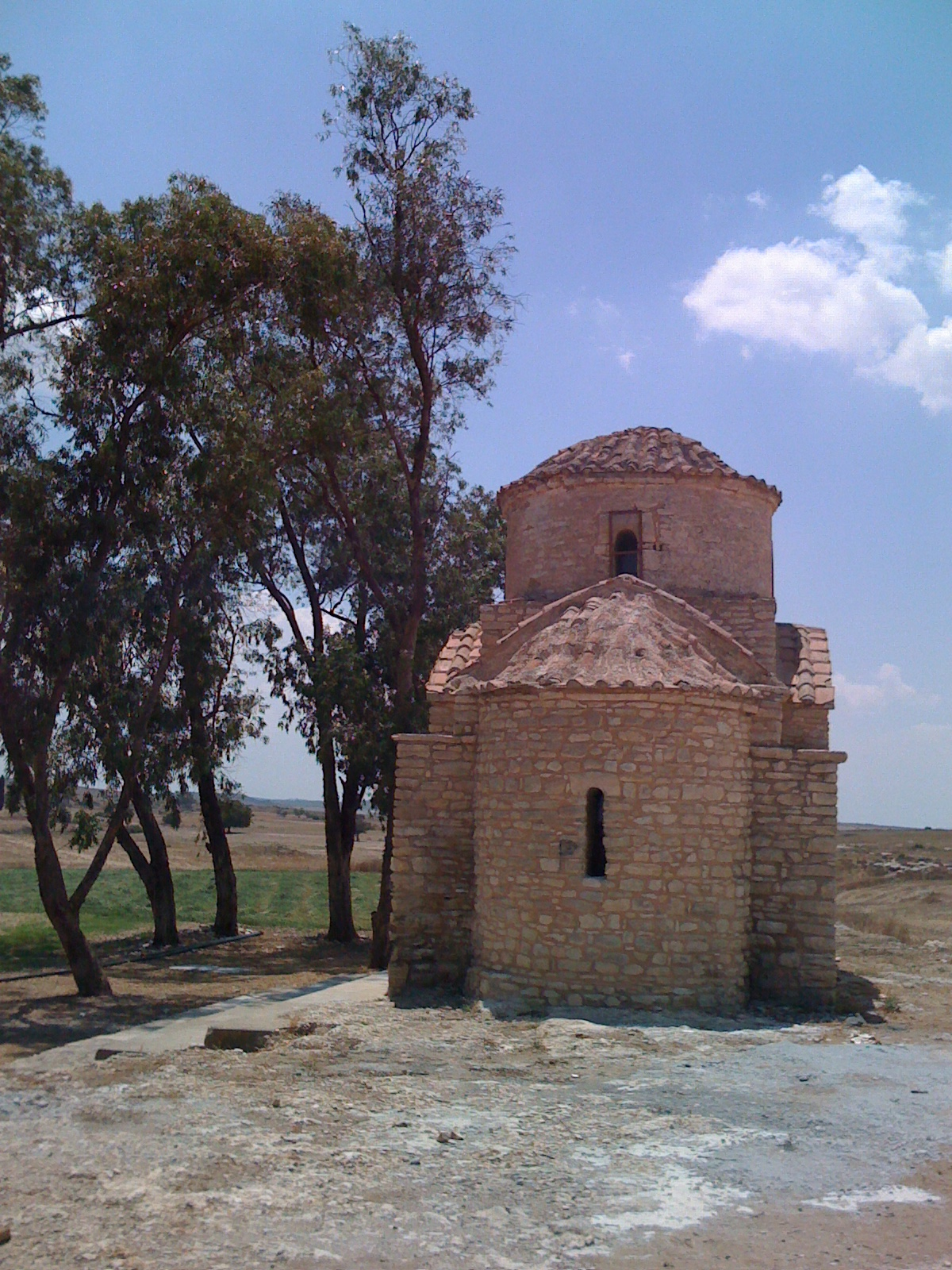
Side-view of the church

The Church of St. Euphemianos (Greek: Άγιος Ευφημιανός, Turkish: Agios Efimianos Kilisesi) is a small medieval church (located at 35° 5'8.70"N 33°39'53.00"E), about 2 km to the southwest of the village of Lysi in the Famagusta district of Cyprus. It is a very small, single-dome, stone building and the interior is decorated with frescoes dating back to the 13th and 14th centuries.

== Dedication ==
The inscription on the bottom of the arch indicates that the temple was dedicated by Lavrentios, monk and abbot of St. Andronikos Monastery, to “St. Themonianos”, a local saint. The inscription reads (in Greek):

“ΠΑΝΣΕΠΤΟΣ ΝΑΟΣ ΤΟΥ ΟΣΙΟΥ ΠΑΤΡΟΣ ΘΕΜΟΝΙΑΝΟΥ ΔΙΑ ΣΥΝΔΡΟΜΗΣ ΚΑΙ ΕΚ ΠΟΛΛΟΥ ΠΟΘΟΥ ΛΑΥΡΕΝΤΙΟΥ ΙΕΡΟΜΟΝΑΧΟΥ ΚΑΙ ΚΑΘΗΓΟΥΜΕΝΟΥ ΤΗΣ ΣΕΒΑΣΜΙΑΣ ΜΟΝΗΣ ΤΟΥ ΕΝ ΑΓΙΟΙΣ ΠΑΤΡΟΣ ΗΜΩΝ ΑΝΔΡΟΝΙΚΟΥ.”

The name St. Themonianos mentioned in the inscription is almost certainly a corruption on the name of St. Euphemianos, a local 12th-century saint who led an ascetic life in a cave near the village of Lefkoniko in the plain of Masaoria, and was one of "three hundred" Palestinian refugees who fled to Cyprus during the Arab persecutions against the Christians. Other variations on the name include Phenianos (Φηνιανός), Thymianos (Θυμιανός), or Thomianos (Θωμιανός). The church itself was colloquially known to the local villagers as St. Phenianos (Άις Φηνιανός). Technically, the Church of St. Euphemianos is a chapel, due to its diminutive size and the fact that it was not the main church of Lysi, there was no priest assigned to it, and services were only held there on special occasions. Before the Turkish invasion of Cyprus in 1974, thousands would visit the church on the Saint’s feast day on November 14.

== Dome and Byzantine frescoes ==
The dome of the church is decorated with a fresco showing Christ Pantocrator, the 'All sovereign'. Surrounding the figure of Christ is a double row of angels moving towards the Hetoimasia or empty throne prepared by God the Father for the Second Coming of Christ. The throne is guarded by the Archangel Michael and Archangel Gabriel and two seraphim. The Virgin Mary leads one line of angels to the throne, while John the Baptist leads the other. In the apse, the Virgin is depicted as flanked by the two archangels with a medallion on her breast of the infant Christ, symbolizing the Incarnation of Christ.

The frescoes within the church were maintained in good condition and in 1972 maintenance was undertaken by the Department of Antiquities of Cyprus. Following the 1974 Turkish invasion the frescos were removed, sometime between 1974 and the spring of 1983. The dome fresco with Christ Pantokrator and an apse depicting the Virgin Mary were cut into 38 pieces, and shipped to Germany by Aydın Dikmen, the Turkish art dealer and notorious smuggler, who claimed they originated from an abandoned church in southern Turkey, and prepared to sell them into the European art market. The Department of Antiquities of Cyprus was able to show that the murals were forcibly removed from the church of St. Euphemianos and following lengthy negotiations, it was agreed that ownership of the murals belongs to the Orthodox Church of Cyprus. The 38 fresco fragments were bought by the Houston-based Menil Foundation on behalf of the Greek Orthodox Church of Cyprus, the rightful owner of the frescoes. The Menil Foundation then funded a careful restoration of the paintings. A February 1992 agreement signed by the Church of Cyprus and the Menil Foundation specified that the Menil Foundation will take care of the frescoes and cover the ongoing costs of conservation in exchange for the right to present the frescoes for a period of twenty years, concluding in February 2012.

The Foundation opened the Byzantine Fresco Chapel in 1997, a purpose-built home for the frescoes designed by architect François de Menil. The Byzantine Fresco Chapel also serves as the space for exhibition of the frescoes which are the only intact Byzantine frescoes of this size and importance to be found anywhere in the entire western hemisphere.

On September 23, 2011 the Church of Cyprus and The Menil foundation announced that they had reached an agreement for the repatriation of the frescoes to Cyprus upon the expiration of the loan agreement in February 2012.

== Gallery ==
The original dome frescoes depicting Christ Pantokrator. Photo taken during restoration work done by the Department of Antiquities in 1972

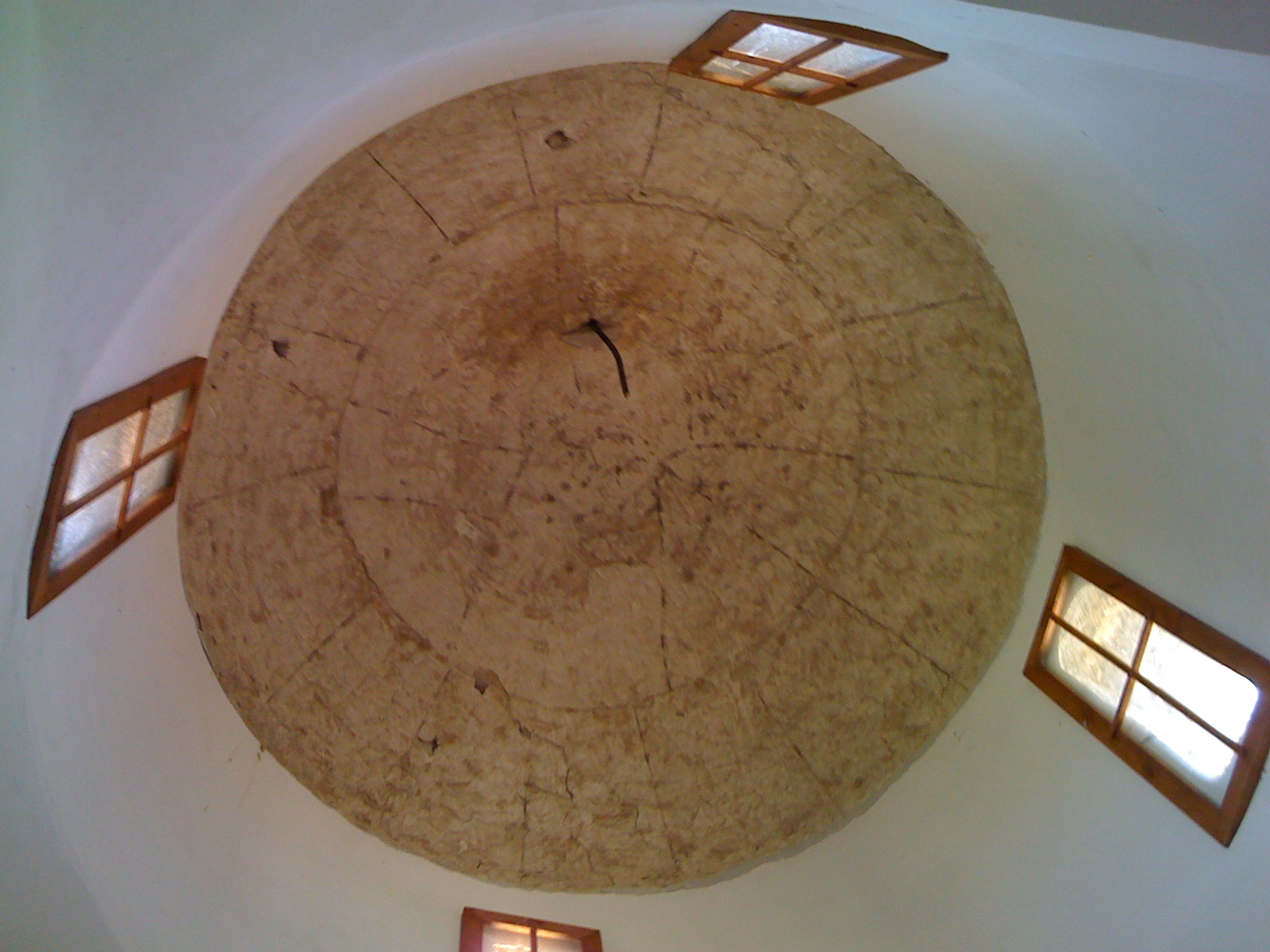
The dome of the church in its present state with the frescoes removed (June 2010)

== See also ==
- Dominique de Menil
