= The Musician (Tamara de Lempicka) =

1929 painting by Tamara de Lempicka

- Artist: Tamara de Lempicka
- Year: 1929
- Medium: Oil on canvas
- Dimensions: 115.8 cm × 73 cm (45.6 in × 29 in)
- Location: Private collection

The Musician (French: La Musicienne) also known as Blue Woman with a Guitar (French: Femme bleu a la guitare) is a 1929 oil-on-canvas painting by the Polish Art Deco painter Tamara de Lempicka.

== Description ==
The painting depicts a young, elegant, dark-haired woman wearing a blue dress. The woman is absorbed in music making holding a guitar in her hands. The figure of the woman is set against a city landscape.

== History and analysis ==
The painting was created by Lempicka in 1929 in Paris. In 2009, it was stolen from the Scheringa Museum of Realist Art in Spanbroek and went missing for seven years. In 2017, the artwork was recovered by Dutch art crime investigator Artur Brand alongside a stolen piece by Salvador Dalí. The painting is also notable in that it was featured in Madonna's music video to her 1990 song Vogue.

The female figure in the painting draws comparisons to classical muses or Renaissance sibyls and can be interpreted as an allegorical representation of the art of music, which is a traditional theme in art. However, the artist decided to portray the woman in a very modern manner: she has a chic flapper hairstyle and her figure is presented against an urban landscape. This juxtaposition of old and new is a characteristic feature of many of her works. The skyscrapers visible in the background demonstrate "a maturation in Lempicka’s style, as they represent her exposure to the new technological marvels of America".

== Art market ==
In November 2018, the painting was purchased by an anonymous buyer for over US$ 9 million at a Christie's auction in New York. Lempicka's The Musician set a new record for the most expensive painting by a Polish artist at the time.

== See also ==
- Art Deco
- List of Polish painters
