= Michel van Rijn =

Dutch art smuggler and author (1950–2024)

- Van Rijn in 2011
- Born: 1950; Netherlands
- Died: July 2024 (aged 73); Italy
- Occupation: Art smuggler
- Years active: 1960s–1990s

Michel van Rijn (1950 – July 2024) was a Dutch art smuggler, art trader, art forger and author. He was involved in worldwide art smuggling from the 1960s to 1990s. Scotland Yard estimated that he was involved in 80 to 90% of all international art smuggling during the 1970s and 1980s. In the 1990s and 2000s Van Rijn cooperated with authorities in finding stolen pieces of art.

== Life ==
Van Rijn was born in 1950 and grew up in Amsterdam. His father was a dentist and his mother an artist. Van Rijn stated that his mother was of Jewish descent. His father owned a large collection of tribal art and artists frequented the house, all of which made the young Van Rijn interested in art. Van Rijn stated that by age 15 he had already been kicked out of seven schools. At age 15 Van Rijn went to Istanbul, Turkey, where he bought coats which he sold in the Netherlands. At age 17 he settled in Beirut, Lebanon, and subsequently got involved in art smuggling in the former Soviet Union. Through an Armenian contact he got involved with icons. During the 1960s and 1970s he smuggled art from the Soviet Union and Armenia to Israel. In this period he also smuggled Fabergé eggs. He smuggled art from the Middle East and Cuba. He stated that he smuggled art from Cuba until the late 1980s. At one point Van Rijn smuggled artwork into both Europe and the United States and he was pursued by both Interpol and the CIA. Scotland Yard estimated that Van Rijn was involved in 80–90% of all international art smuggling in the 1970s and 1980s. Van Rijn had a playboy lifestyle, owning various houses.

Van Rijn was convicted in France for art forgery sometime before 1988. He was once arrested in Marbella, Spain and faced extradition to France. During the 1990s Van Rijn started cooperating with authorities. He said he was inspired to do so after seeing Nok culture sculptures in Nigeria being protected by locals as they revered the statues. In subsequent years he worked with the Israeli Mossad, the American FBI, and the British Scotland Yard in the pursuit of stolen art. As an art trader he owned a store on the Keizersgracht in Amsterdam.

Van Rijn was known as a controversial man in the art scene and as a man of deception, who did not deny he broke the law at times. He was also known for his tall tales. He once claimed to be a descendant of Rembrandt van Rijn in order to double the price of a work by the painter. He also misled auction house Sotheby's in an act of revenge by providing them with a forged work, of which he only on the date of the auction revealed it was forged. Van Rijn was also an art forger himself, he claimed to have replicated a painting by Marc Chagall and took a picture with Chagall and the painting, helping him claim a genuine provenance. Van Rijn made numerous enemies. He claimed to have been shot at three times, once receiving a grazing shot while in Amsterdam. In the United States he was questioned for two days by the FBI in relation to the Isabella Stewart Gardner Museum theft.

Van Rijn was involved in the return of art taken during the Turkish invasion of Cyprus in 1974, which had been sold on the black market. During the mid-1990s he sold back art for half a million dollars to Cypriot honorary consul Tasoula Hadjitofi in the Netherlands. In total he sold back involved artworks at two occasions, earning millions. He knew further artworks were in Germany. Together with a Cypriot official and two persons from Interpol he arranged to meet a Turkish-born seller, Aydın Dikmen, of such artworks in Munich in 1997. The operation managed to recover $40 million worth of art. Van Rijn however refused to testify against the seller, having received death threats. It was later revealed that Van Rijn and Dikmen had also been involved in the sale of the royal doors of Peristeronopigi, which had travelled from Cyprus to the Netherlands and later to the Kanazawa College of Art in Japan, from which they were ultimately returned to Cyprus in 2021.

Around the year 2000 he stopped his cooperation with authorities and he started a website in which he provided information on stolen art and indicated who might be responsible for the theft. In 2000 Scotland Yard announced that it would launch in an investigation of the contacts between the organisation and Van Rijn. In 2002 Van Rijn met Arthur Brand, who over time became his assistant. In January 2005 Van Rijn spent five days in Swiss detention after being arrested on suspicion of extortion. He was arrested at Basel airport. Van Rijn had stated that two Lebanese brothers had unlawful possession of a bronze Apollo statue and one of the brothers filed a complaint against Van Rijn. Van Rijn was released due to a lack of evidence. In 2006, while cooperating with Scotland Yard, Van Rijn managed to return a stolen Moche headdress from the possession of Leonardo Patterson to Peru.

In 2015 Van Rijn had a falling out with several people, including his former assistant, Arthur Brand. Several people claimed Van Rijn had not paid for services provided to him and had overvalued paintings he sold them. Van Rijn claimed Brand led a smear campaign against him after the two parted ways around 2009. In 2017 he had a further falling out with German art collector Tilman Bohn, Lebanese billionaire Halim Korban and Dutch investor Boudewijn Sanders. Van Rijn replied to the claims against him with a cryptic e-mail to publisher Quote.

== Personal life ==
Van Rijn had several children, including two sons. He became friends with art investigator Arthur Brand and British painter Lucian Freud. Van Rijn spent some time in a rehabilitation clinic in Curaçao. Throughout his life Van Rijn obtained various nicknames, and a BBC reporter named him the "Indiana Jones of Chelsea". He was also called "The Lying Dutchman". He was also compared to James Bond and Al Capone.

Van Rijn lived in various places, including Rome and Havana. He also lived in London, United Kingdom. At one point he lived in Livorno, Italy. Van Rijn lived his final years in Italy. He died there in July 2024, aged 73.

== In media ==
In the 1990s RTL made a program about him. The Dutch public broadcaster AVRO made a documentary about Van Rijn in 2006. In 2007 he was featured in the show Hoge bomen in de misdaad. Van Rijn's life was made into a film in the 2016 thriller The Iconoclast by Adam Stone.

== Works ==
- Hot Art Cold Cash, 1993.
- Het Mekka Manuscript.
- De Vijfde Sarcofaag (2006)
- Cuba Libre
