= Levitated Mass =

2012 sculpture by Michael Heizer

Coordinates: 34°03′52″N 118°21′36″W

- Artist: Michael Heizer
- Year: 2012
- Type: Large-scale sculpture
- Location: Los Angeles County Museum of Art; Los Angeles

Levitated Mass is a 2012 large-scale public art by Michael Heizer at Resnick North Lawn at the Los Angeles County Museum of Art (LACMA). The installation consists of a 340-ton boulder placed above a 456 feet (139 m) viewing pathway to accommodate 360-degree viewing. The nature, expense and scale of the installation attracted discussion within the public art world, and its notable 106 miles (171 km) transit from the Jurupa Valley Quarry in Riverside County was widely covered by the media.

The piece is open to the public during museum hours and does not require museum admission.

== Concept and construction ==
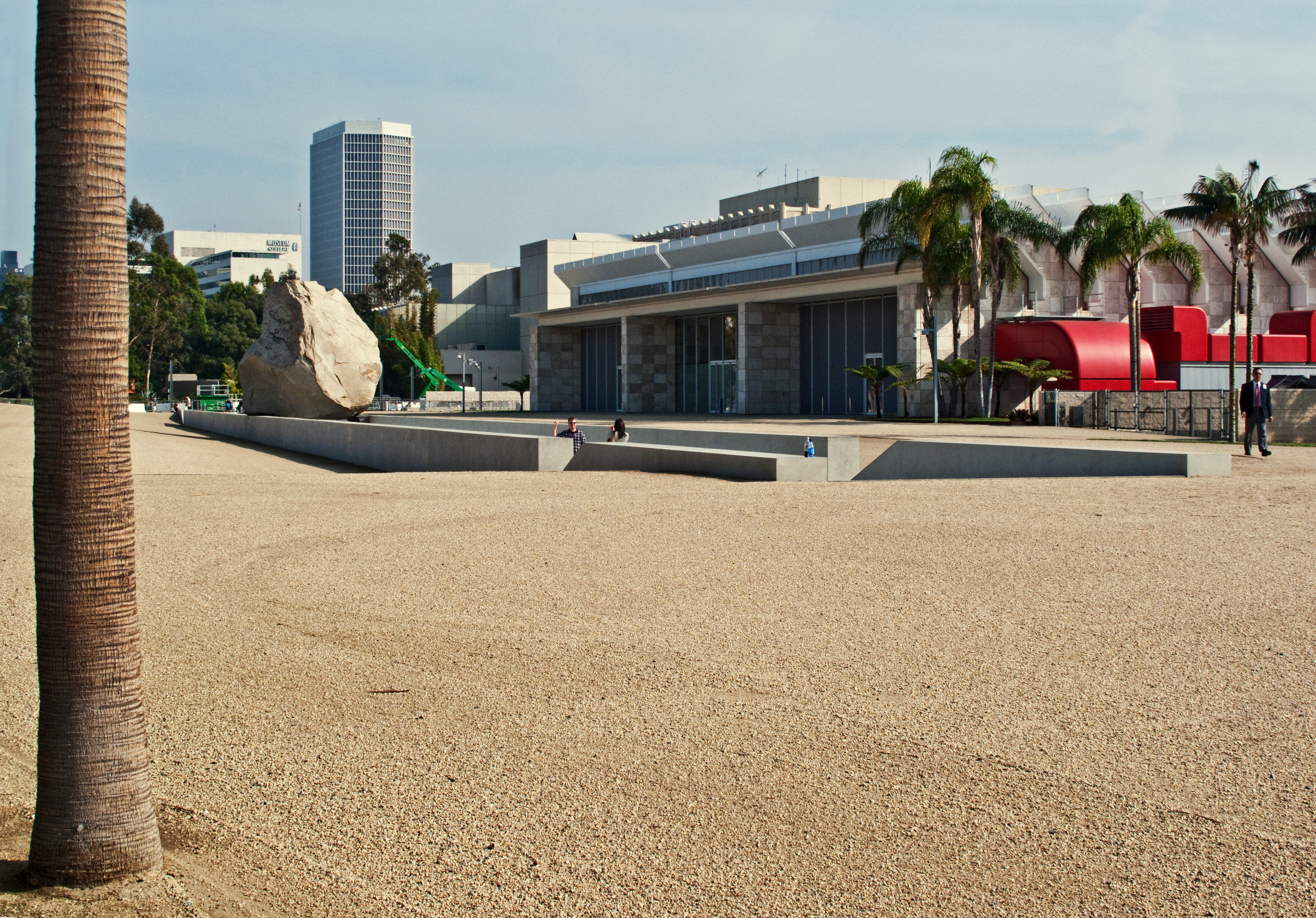
The rock installation in LACMA's backyard

The work is composed of a 21.5-foot (6.55 m) tall boulder mounted on the walls of a 456-foot (138.98 m) long concrete trench, surrounded by 2.5 acres (1.0 ha) of compressed decomposed granite. The boulder is bolted to two shelves affixed to the inner walls of the trench, which descends from ground level to 15 feet (4.5 m) below the stone at its center, allowing visitors to stand directly below the megalith.

Initial plans for the work described the boulder as being affixed to the trench walls themselves, giving the boulder the appearance of "floating" when viewed from within the trench via optical illusion, hence the work's title. Support shelves were subsequently required, which arguably compromised the floating effect. A 1982 Heizer work in Manhattan, also called Levitated Mass, consists of a much smaller, carved rock set on hidden supports, and does preserve this "floating" effect.

Heizer rarely explains or comments on his work and has never offered a public explanation of Levitated Mass's meaning or significance. He has however described the piece as being "static art" and emphasized the importance of the boulder's size and of the work's longevity, saying that the work is meant to last 3,500 years. LACMA has published a preliminary sketch of the work by Heizer that contains a handwritten notation saying that the work "destroys 'gestalt' concepts".

== History ==
Levitated Mass arrives at LACMA on the morning of March 10, 2012.

Heizer first conceived of the work in 1968, and attempted its construction using a 120-ton boulder in 1969. This attempt was abandoned, however, when the boom of the crane being used to lift the boulder broke. In December 2006, Heizer discovered a new 340-ton rock at Stone Valley Quarry in Jurupa Valley, California, in Riverside County while preparing a different project. With the help of LACMA director Michael Govan, funding was secured for the boulder's removal and transportation and for the construction of the finished work at the museum. The cost of the project has been estimated at $10 million, and was funded entirely via private donations.

The boulder was originally scheduled for transport in August 2011. Due to the difficulty in securing permits for the journey, the trip was repeatedly delayed, with the boulder finally leaving the quarry at the end of February 2012. The rock was loaded onto a 295 feet (90 m) long, 196-wheeled transporter custom-built by Emmert International. Because of the transporter's size and needs, the boulder could only be moved at night at a maximum speed of about 7 miles per hour (11 km/h). Though the quarry is located less than 60 miles (97 km) from the LACMA campus, a circuitous 106 miles (171 km) route traversing 22 cities in 4 counties was taken in order to avoid busier roads or overpasses that could not support the combined weight of the boulder and transporter. Numerous trees were cut down, cars towed and traffic lights temporarily removed in order to facilitate the transporter's movement. The rock itself was wrapped in cotton sheets and an outer layer of thick plastic before being loaded onto the transporter. The trip took 11 days, with large crowds gathering to see the boulder both in motion and while parked during the day. Spontaneous block parties and at least one marriage proposal took place at the transporter's various resting places. The transporter finally arrived at LACMA at 4:30 am on March 10, 2012. A crowd estimated at over 1,000 assembled to see the installation's arrival.

Completion of the concrete trench and the final securing of the boulder took an additional three months. The installation was opened to the public on June 24, 2012, at a ceremony attended by Govan, Los Angeles Mayor Antonio Villaraigosa, County Supervisor Zev Yaroslavsky and the famously reclusive Heizer himself.

== Reception ==
Los Angeles Times art critic Christopher Knight said that Levitated Mass was "a good sculpture if not a great one", describing the dichotomy of a desert landscape cut into Los Angeles's urban metropolis and of the sculpture's permanence in a comparatively fragile cityscape. Adding "as monoliths go, the stone seems rather modest."

During the journey of Levitated Mass's boulder from quarry to museum, French artist Régis Perray moved a toy dump truck carrying 340 grams of dust from the vault of the Chartres Cathedral as a work entitled 340 Grammes Déplacés... during Levitated Mass by Michael Heizer. The work curated by Observatoire du Land Art was a transatlantic action performed as an "echo" of Levitated Mass's simultaneous displacement of 340 tons of rock.

Complex magazine listed Levitated Mass as one of its 50 Most Iconic Artworks of the Past Five Years.

A parody/tribute work by Mungo Thomson, entitled Levitating Mass, was commissioned by the Aspen Art Museum and appeared at the 2012 Aspen Old-Fashioned Fourth of July Parade, just ten days after the public opening of the original work. It consists of a one-half scale helium balloon replica of Levitated Mass's central boulder.

Boulder Mass: The Levitation is a short-subject avant-garde film by director Joseph Quinn.

Levitated Mass: The Story of Michael Heizer's Monolithic Sculpture, a documentary by filmmaker Doug Pray, debuted at LACMA's Bing Theater on June 20, 2013, as part of the Los Angeles Film Festival. The film focuses on the transport of the boulder from Riverside to Los Angeles, while also examining Heizer's body of work.

== See also ==
- List of individual rocks
