= Humboldt Cave =

- U.S. National Register of Historic Places
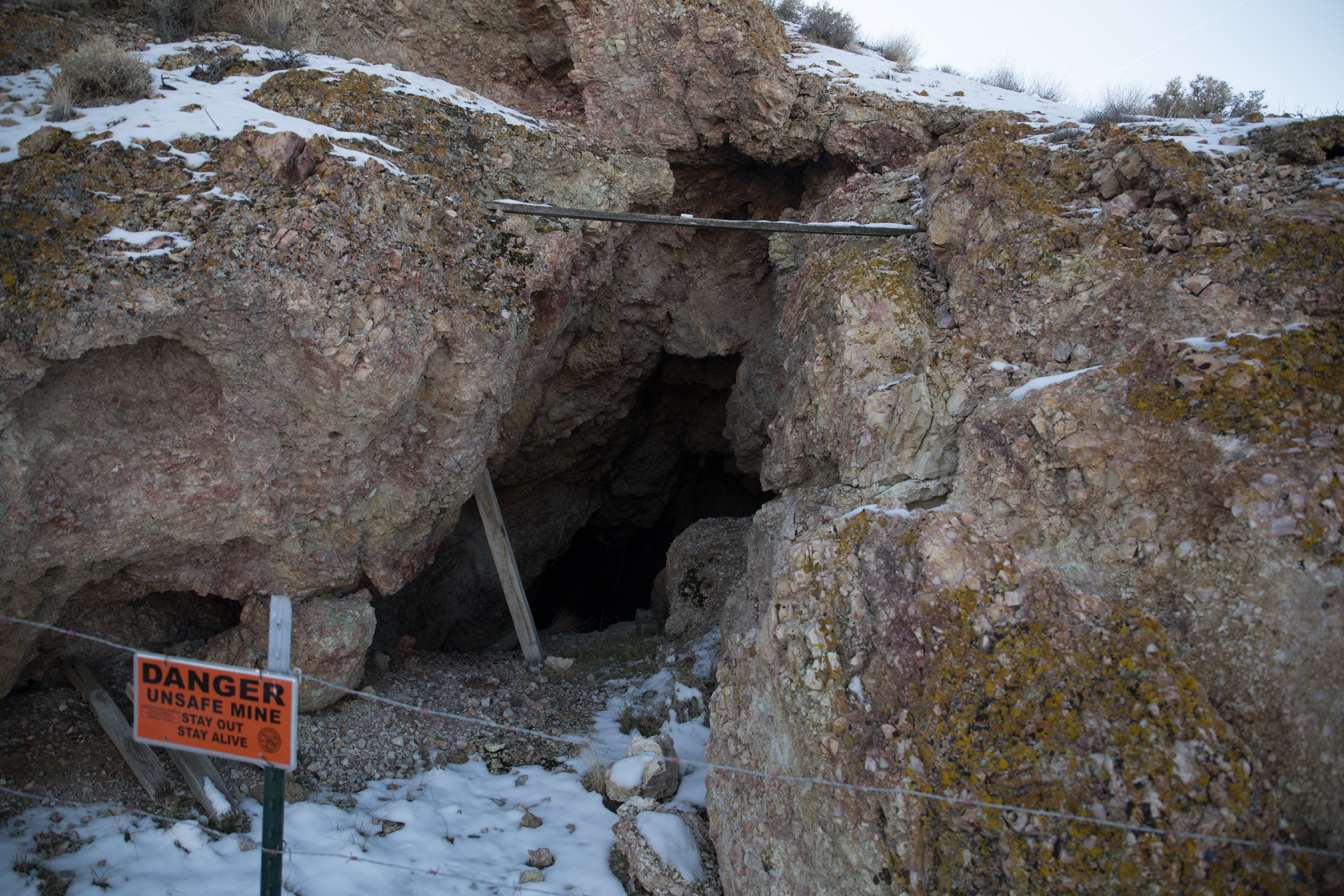

- Location within Nevada Location within the United States
- Nearest city: Lovelock, Nevada
- Coordinates: 39°52′54″N 118°43′20″W
- Area: 40 acres (16 ha)
- NRHP reference No.: 76001140
- Added to NRHP: March 15, 1976

Humboldt Cave is an archaeological site in Churchill County, Nevada. Thirty-one caches were excavated from the cave, but there is only one radiocarbon date of 1953±175 14C BP (~2000 years ago) from the cave, which suggests that Humboldt Cave may have only been a single cultural component. In other words, the caches from the cave may have only been deposited once and at the same time.

== Location ==
Humboldt Cave is located near the southern end of the West Humboldt Range in Churchill County, Nevada. The cave overlooks the Humboldt Sink, lying approximately 67 metres (220 ft) above the former lakebed and about 10 kilometres (6.2 mi) away. The surrounding landscape forms part of the Great Basin.

== Description ==
Humboldt Cave is a relatively small dry cave formed by vertical faulting in a cliff face. During the existence of Lake Lahontan, an ancient lake that once covered much of northwestern Nevada, the cave was periodically flooded. These floods deposited layers of tufa, a type of limestone, on the cave's surfaces and helped protect them from erosion.

The cave entrance is approximately 2.4 metres (7.9 ft) high and 1.8 metres (5.9 ft) wide, widening to about 2.4 metres (7.9 ft) inside and extending approximately 15 metres (49 ft) into the cliff face.

Before excavation, much of the cave floor was covered by bat guano to depths ranging from 0.9 to 1.8 metres (3.0 to 5.9 ft). The cave's dry conditions and deep deposits of guano helped preserve organic materials that would normally decay, including textiles, clothing, and other artifacts.

== Excavation ==
Humboldt Cave was excavated in 1936 by Robert F. Heizer of the University of California, Berkeley. The Archaeology of Humboldt Cave, Churchill County, Nevada was not published until 1956. Heizer concluded that the remote location relative to the lake and marshes made Humboldt Cave a temporary refuge rather than a permanent residence.

Initial stages of excavation concentrated on improving access by widening the cave's opening. The cave was surveyed and divide into twelve sections 3 feet (0.91 m) wide by the width of the cave for individual excavation. Sections were excavated in 6-inch (15 cm) increments. Apart from fur, feather, bone, wood and horn that had been damaged by insects and rodents, artifacts were recovered in near-perfect condition. A total of about 1,400 cubic feet (40 m^{3}) of deposits were removed from the cave. No significant evidence of distinct occupation levels was apparent. Heizer proposed that Humboldt Cave's occupants corresponded to those of the later or upper levels of Lovelock Cave. The cave had been occupied by pack rats, who filled any available space with gathered material, which included artifacts, particularly in a low hollowed space that the excavators called the "South Alcove." Pack rats jumbled much of the material, as was illustrated when, during excavation, a wool sweater was left in the cave. Rats shredded the sweater and took the pieces into the alcove, where parts of sweater were recovered all the way to the solid cave floor during later excavation.

== Artifacts ==
Most of the objects recovered from Humboldt Cave were found in 31 cache pits that may have been deposited during a single cultural component approximately 2,000 years ago. The people who used the cave stored a variety of items in these caches, including duck decoys, bird-skin robes, rush mats, fiber bags, skin pouches, and fur robes. Waterfowl remains were also recovered from the cave. Some artifacts indicate trade or cultural contacts with groups in California west of the Sierra Nevada and the American Southwest.

One cache, referred to by excavators as the "shaman's cache", contained a bird-skin robe, pouches, waterfowl bones and skins, hawk feathers, and a stuffed canvasback duck head. The robe was believed to have originally been feathered, although many of the feathers were damaged by insects while buried. Heizer suggested that the people who assembled the cache may have used these objects as curative tokens or in the manufacture of decoys.

The cave's inhabitants also fashioned sickles from the horns of bighorn sheep.

== Protection ==
Humboldt Cave was placed on the National Register of Historic Places on March 16, 1976. It was included due to its significance as a prehistoric archaeological site and for its importance as a training ground for students of archaeology.
