= City (artwork) =

Land art sculpture in Nevada, U.S.

Coordinates: 38°01′48″N 115°26′10″W

- Location within Nevada Location within the United States
- Artist: Michael Heizer
- Year: 1970–2022
- Completion date: 2 September 2022
- Medium: Soil, rock, concrete
- Movement: Land art
- Dimensions: 0.80 km × 2.4 km (0.5 mi × 1.5 mi)
- Owner: Triple Aught Foundation
- Website: www.tripleaughtfoundation.org

City is a land art sculpture by Michael Heizer in Garden Valley, a desert valley in rural Lincoln County in the U.S. state of Nevada. More than a mile long, it is the largest contemporary artwork ever built. It was begun in 1972, took 50 years to complete, and cost an estimated $40 million. City is maintained by the Triple Aught Foundation and opened on September 2, 2022, to limited, reservation-only viewing by a maximum of six visitors per day.

== Concept ==
Like Heizer's Double Negative (1969), City is designed and executed on a massive scale. Covering a space approximately one and a quarter miles long and more than a quarter of a mile wide (2 km by 0.4 km, roughly the scale of the National Mall), City is one of the largest sculptures ever created. Using local dirt, rock, sand, and concrete as building materials, and assembled with heavy machinery, the work is composed of five phases, each consisting of a number of structures called complexes, with some of the structures reaching a height of 80 feet (24 m).

City attempts to synthesize ancient monuments, minimalism, and industrial technology. Heizer's inspiration for the work came while he was visiting Yucatan and studying Chichen Itza.

== Management ==
City was financed by several patrons, including the Dia Art Foundation and Lannan Foundation, with an estimated cost of well over $40 million. Heizer completed the work in 2022 with a team of roughly a dozen after previously anticipating completion by 2010.

City is owned and administered by the nonprofit Triple Aught Foundation with a board including Heizer and leaders from arts organizations. It is open to the public as part of the terms of their conservation agreement. It is open to viewing by online reservation only on a limited number of days, with visitors transported to and from the site. Admission is free to residents of Lincoln, Nye, and White Pine Counties in Nevada and $150 for all others.

== Conservation ==
Garden Valley has been eyed for several major projects in the years since Heizer started working on his sculpture. In the 1970s and early 1980s, the government planned to crisscross the valley and others nearby with railroad tracks that would carry MX missiles to and from hidden silos. The program was vetoed by President Ronald Reagan.

The proposed Yucca Mountain Repository, a U.S. Department of Energy terminal storage facility for spent nuclear reactor and other radioactive waste would have included a new railroad line across Garden Valley, and would have come within its sightline. Heizer reportedly considered burying City if this line was built.

In September 2014, U.S. Senator Harry Reid of Nevada introduced the Garden Valley Withdrawal Act, a bill that would preserve the land around City and protect 805,100 acres of federal land from mineral and energy development. Reid had visited the area around City in 2007, and tried to pass a similar bill in 2010 that would designate part of Garden Valley and nearby Coal Valley as a national conservation area. In early 2015, a group of American museums, including the Los Angeles County Museum of Art, the Museum of Modern Art, the Institute of Contemporary Art, Boston, the Walker Art Center, and the Nevada Museum of Art joined together to urge preservation of the area.

In July 2015, the area became part of the newly created Basin and Range National Monument. The national monument designation prevents new railroad or power lines and other development.
