= Michael Heizer =

American artist associated with Land Art movement

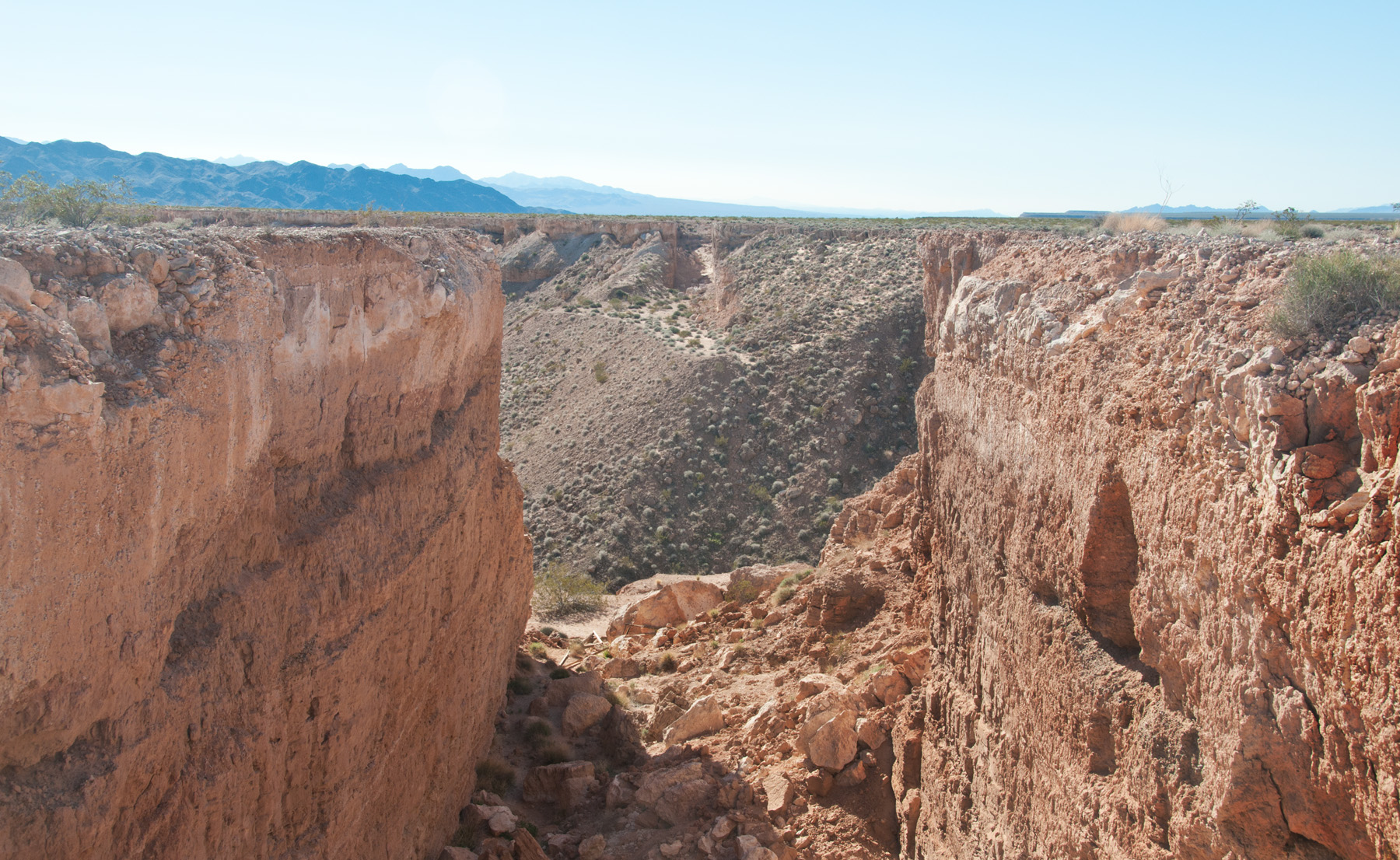
- Double Negative, 1969, Nevada
- Born: November 4, 1944 (age 81); Berkeley, California, United States
- Education: San Francisco Art Institute
- Known for: Land art, sculpture, painting

Michael Heizer (born 9 November 1944) is an American land artist specializing in large-scale and site-specific sculptures. Working largely outside the confines of the traditional art spaces of galleries and museums, Heizer has redefined sculpture in terms of size, mass, gesture, and process. A pioneer of 20th-century land art or Earthworks movement, he is widely recognized for sculptures and environmental structures made with earth-moving equipment, which he began creating in the American West in 1967. He lives and works in Hiko, Nevada, and New York City.

== Work ==
Michael Heizer is the son of the archaeologist Robert Heizer, and he studied at the San Francisco Art Institute, in 1963–1964. He settled in New York, in 1966. Heizer's first works were canvases of geometric patterns painted with PVA latex, in New York in 1966. The paintings that would follow, characterized by non-traditionally shaped canvases, demonstrate Heizer's early exploration of positive and negative forms; such harmonies of presence and absence, matter and space, are essential to his art. In Trapezoid Painting (1966) and Track Painting (1967), he emphasizes the perimeters of raw canvases by painting them black, while the white interiors are perceived as negative spaces. These hard-edged "displacement paintings" parallel the immense geometries he achieves when moving earth. The slate grey contours of U Painting (1975), for example, anticipate the shapes of the depressions and angular mounds that appear in one of his latest projects City.

In the late 1960s, Heizer left New York City for the deserts of California and Nevada, where he began making his first "negative" sculptures. These works were created by removing earth to shape subterranean negative forms directly into desert floor. Completed in 1967, North, East, South, West, consisted of several geometrically shaped holes dug in the Sierra Nevada. In 1968, he accompanied land artists Nancy Holt and Robert Smithson on their first trip across the American West to Virginia City, Nevada and Lone Pine, California. That same year Heizer completed Nine Nevada Depressions, a series of large negative sculptures located primarily on dry lakes throughout the state, Jean Dry Lake, Black Rock Desert and Massacre Dry Lake, near Vya, Nevada among them. In 1969, Heizer made the series Primitive Dye Paintings, in which white lime powder and concentrated aniline dyes were spread over the dry desert landscape, covering large areas that, when viewed from the air, formed amorphous, organic shapes. The culmination of this critical early period was the creation of Double Negative in 1969, a project for which he displaced 240,000 tons of rock in the Nevada desert, cutting two enormous trenches—each one 50-feet-deep and 30-feet-wide and together spanning 1,500 feet—at the eastern edge of Mormon Mesa near Overton, Nevada.

Heizer has since continued his exploration of the dynamics between positive forms and negative space. His Adjacent, Against, Upon (1976) juxtaposes three large granite slabs in different relationships to cast concrete forms; the 30–50 ton granite slabs were quarried in the Cascade Mountain Range and transported by barge and train to Myrtle Edwards Park. For Displaced/Replaced Mass (1969/1977), later installed outside the Marina del Rey, California, home of Roy and Carol Doumani, he planted four granite boulders of different sizes from the High Sierra into lid-less concrete boxes in the earth so that the tops of the rocks are roughly level with the ground. For a 1982 work at the former IBM Building in New York, Heizer sheared off the top of a large rock and cut grooves into the surface before setting it on supports hidden within a stainless steel structure. Designed as a fountain, the boulder appears to float over running water. He called it Levitated Mass, a title he would use again in the future. Commissioned by the president of the Ottawa Silica Company, the Effigy Tumuli earthwork in Illinois is composed of five abstract animal earthworks reclaiming the site of an abandoned surface coal mine along the Illinois River; the shapes (1983–85)—a frog, a water strider, a catfish, a turtle, and a snake—reflect the environment of the site, which overlooks the river. In 1983, Heizer received a Guggenheim Fellowship for Fine Arts.

In 2012, Heizer completed Levitated Mass (2012). On permanent installation at Los Angeles County Museum of Art, Levitated Mass is a massive white, diorite boulder (21.5 feet wide and 21.5 feet high) that sits atop a 456-foot-long sloped walkway, allowing viewers to experience the weight of the rock as they walk through the empty space below. It took eleven nights, from February 28 to March 10, 2012, to move the 340-ton rock from Jurupa Valley to the museum. The installation is situated in a field of polished concrete slices, set at a slight angle between the Resnick Pavilion and Sixth Street. Heizer opened the exhibit on June 24, 2012. A feature documentary, also named Levitated Mass, was directed and edited by the filmmaker Doug Pray. It details the making of the sculpture as it relates to Heizer's career while portraying the boulder's 105-mile journey through Los Angeles and the public's reaction to its installation. Other recent public artworks by Michael Heizer include Tangential Circular Negative Line in Mauvoisin, Switzerland, commissioned by Fondation Air&Art directed by Jean Maurice Varone, as well as Collapse (1967/2016) and Compression Line (1968/2016) at Glenstone, Potomac, Maryland.

Collapse (1967/2016) at Glenstone in 2023

In the early 1970s, Heizer began work on City, an enormous complex in the rural desert of Lincoln County, Nevada. His work on the project continues to this day, supported by the Dia Art Foundation through a grant from the Lannan Foundation. Limited public access to City began in 2022.

A campaign to have the Basin and Range area around City designated as a national monument to protect it from development took place, and a group of American museums, including the Los Angeles County Museum of Art (LACMA), the Museum of Modern Art, the Institute of Contemporary Art, Boston and the Walker Art Center, have joined to draw public attention to a petition urging preservation of the area. In July 2015, President Barack Obama signed a proclamation (using his authority under the Antiquities Act of 1906) creating the Basin and Range National Monument on 704,000 acres in Lincoln and Nye counties, an area including Heizer's City.

Heizer's artworks are represented in museum collections and public spaces worldwide.

== Major permanent commissions ==
- Tangential Circular Negative Line (2012), Mauvoisin, Switzerland, an Air&Art Foundation commission directed by Jean Maurice Varone
- Levitated Mass (2012), Resnick Pavilion North Lawn at LACMA, Los Angeles, California
- Effigy Tumuli (1985), Buffalo State Park, Ottawa, Illinois
- 45 Degrees, 90 Degrees, 180 Degrees (1984), Rice University, Houston, Texas
- Levitated Mass (1982), 590 Madison Avenue, New York. EJM Equities Collection, New York
- North, East, South, West (1982), 5th and Flower Streets, Los Angeles

== Other works ==
- Isolated Mass/Circumflex (#2) (1968/1978), Nine Nevada Depressions, Menil Collection, Houston, Texas
- Rift # 1 (1968–72; deteriorated), Nine Nevada Depressions, Massacre Dry Lake, Nevada
- Windows and Matchdrops (1969), seven small rills in the floor in front of the Kunsthalle Düsseldorf entrance, Germany
- Displaced/Replaced Mass 1, 2 & 3 (1969), Silver Springs, NV. No longer extant.
- Double Negative (1969–70), located near Overton, Nevada
- Dragged Mass (1971), Detroit Institute of Arts, Detroit
- City (1972, completed 2022), Lincoln County, Nevada
- Adjacent, Against, Upon (1976), Myrtle Edwards Park, Seattle, Washington
- This Equals That (1980; removed), Michigan State Capitol Complex, Lansing, Michigan
- Charmstone (1991), Menil Collection, Houston
- North, East, South, West (1967/2002), Dia:Beacon, Beacon, New York

== Exhibitions ==
In 1968, Heizer was included in Earth Works, the influential group show at Virginia Dwan's gallery, and then in the Whitney Museum painting annual in 1969, where his contribution was a huge photograph of a dye painting in the desert. For his first one-person show, at the Galerie Heiner Friedrich, Munich in 1969, he removed 1,000 tons of earth in a conical shape to create Munich Depression. In 1977, he was included in documenta 6, Kassel. Major exhibitions of his work have been staged at institutions such as the Museum Folkwang, Essen (1979), the Museum of Contemporary Art, Los Angeles (1984), and Fondazione Prada, Milan (1996). Recent gallery exhibitions have been held at Gagosian Gallery.

=== Selected solo exhibitions ===
- 1971 Michael Heizer: Photographic and Actual Work. Detroit Institute of Arts, Detroit
- 1979 Michael Heizer. Museum Folkwang, Essen. Travelled to Rijksmuseum Kroller-Muller, Otterlo, Netherlands.
- 1984 In Context: Michael Heizer: 45°, 90°, 180°/Geometric Extraction. Museum of Contemporary Art, Los Angeles
- 1985 45°, 90°, 180°: A Sculpture for Rice University. Farish Gallery, School of Architecture, Rice University, Houston
- 1985 Michael Heizer: Dragged Mass geometric. Whitney Museum of American Art, New York
- 1988 Michael Heizer: New Sculptures. Akira Ikeda Gallery, Tokyo
- 1996 Michael Heizer: Negative – Positive +. Fondazione Prada, Milan
- 2010 Michael Heizer: Works from the 1960s and 70s. David Zwirner, New York
- 2012 Michael Heizer: Actual Size. Los Angeles County Museum of Art, Los Angeles
- 2015 Michael Heizer: Altars. Gagosian Gallery, New York
- 2016 Michael Heizer. Whitney Museum of American Art, New York
- 2018 Michael Heizer. Gagosian Le Bourget, Paris
- 2026 Michael Heizer: Negative Sculpture. Gagosian Gallery, New York

=== Selected group exhibitions ===
- 1966 The Annual Invitational Exhibition. Park Place Gallery, New York
- 1968 Earthworks Dwan Gallery, New York
- 1968 1968 Annual Exhibition: Contemporary American Sculpture. Whitney Museum of American Art, New York
- 1969 New Media: New Methods Montclair Art Museum, Montclair, NJ; Organised by Museum of Modern Art, New York.
- 1969 Op Losse Schroeven: Situaties en Cryptostructuren (Square pegs in round Holes). Stedelijk Museum, Amsterdam. Travelled to: Verborgene Strukturen. Museum Folkwang, Essen.
- 1969 Live in Your Head: When Attitudes Become Form. Kunsthalle Bern, Bern, Switzerland. Travelled to: Museum Haus Lange, Krefield, West Germany; Institute of Contemporary Arts, London.
- 1969 Land Art: Long, Flanagan, Oppenheim, Smithson, Boezem, Dibbets, De Maria, Heizer. Fernsehgalerie Gerry Schum, Berlin. Televised April 15, 1969.
- 1969 1969 Annual Exhibition: Contemporary American Painting. Whitney Museum of American Art, New York
- 1970 XXXV Esposizione internazionale d’arte di Venezia Venice
- 1970 Information. Museum of Modern Art, New York
- 1971 Sixth Guggenheim International Exhibition. Solomon R. Guggenheim Museum, New York
- 1971 VII Biennale. Parc Floral de Paris, Paris
- 1973 American Drawings 1963-73. Whitney Museum of American Art, New York
- 1976 Drawing Now. Museum of Modern Art
- 1977 Biennial Exhibition. Whitney Museum of American Art, New York, NY.
- 1977 Documenta 6. Museum Friedericianum, Kassel, Germany.
- 1980 L'Amérique aux Indépendants, 1944-1980 : 91ème Exposition, Société des Artistes Indépendants. Grand Palais, Paris, France.
- 1984 Collectie Becht. De verzameling Agnes en Frits Becht. Stedelijk Museum, Amsterdam, Netherlands.
- 1986 Individuals: A Selected History of Contemporary Art, 1945–1986. Museum of Contemporary Art, Los Angeles, CA.
- 1987 American Drawing and Watercolors of the Twentieth Century. Selection from the Whitney Museum of American Art. National Gallery of Art, Washington, D.C.; traveled to The Cleveland Museum of Art, Cleveland, OH.; Achenbach Foundation, California Palace of the Legion of Honor, San Francisco, CA; Arkansas Arts Center, Little Rock, AR; Whitney Museum of American Art, Stamford, CT.
- 1987 Photography and Art: Interactions since 1946. Los Angeles County Museum of Art, Los Angeles, CA; traveled to The Museum of Fort Lauderdale, Fort Lauderdale,
- 1988 Vital Signs: Organic Abstraction from the Permanent Collection. Whitney Museum of American Art. New York, NY
- 1989 20 Jahre Internationale Kunstmesse Basel. Galerie Hans Mayer, Düsseldorf, Germany.
- 1990 Pharmakon ’90. Nippon Convention Center, Makuhari Messe, Tokyo, Japan.
- 1997 47th International Art Exhibition – La Biennale di Venezia. Venice, Italy.
- 2009 Photoconceptualism, 1966–1973. Whitney Museum of American Art, New York, NY.
- 2010 The Original Copy: Photography of Sculpture, 1839 to Today. The Museum of Modern Art, New York, NY; traveled to Kunsthaus Zürich, Zurich, Switzerland.
- 2013 When Attitudes Become Form: Bern 1969/Venice 2013. Ca’ Corner della Regina, Fondazione Prada, Venice, Italy.

== Homages ==
- Mungo Thomson, Levitating Mass (2012), Aspen, Colorado.
- Régis Perray, 340 grammes déplacés... during Levitated Mass by Michael Heizer (2012), Nantes, France.
- Jack Daws, Life on the Farm (Heizer), 2010
