= Andreas Moleskis =

Dr Andreas Moleskis was born in the now occupied village of Lysi, in the Famagusta district of Cyprus, in 1948. He graduated with a degree in economics at the University of Athens and then continued his post-graduate studies in India and in the United Kingdom. He holds a doctorate degree in Manpower Planning from the UMIST in the U.K.

He served for a number of years at the Ministry of Commerce, Industry and Tourism (Department of Industry), at the Ministry of Labor and Social Insurance as Supervisor of the Reactivation Service for Refugees, and at the Department of Labor as the responsible Officer in charge for the Employment of Foreign Workers in Cyprus. In 1988 he started working at the Secretariat of the Council of Ministers of the Republic of Cyprus and from March 2003 until April 2009 he was appointed Secretary of the Council of Ministers.

As of 1 December 2004 he was also appointed Permanent Secretary of the Planning Bureau, which is the Governmental Office responsible for the promotion and coordination of the economic and social growth of Cyprus. As the Permanent Secretary of the Planning Bureau, he was the Head of the Managing Authority for the detailed management of programmes co-funded from the Structural Funds of the EU, as well as the National Aid Coordinator for all per-accession funds received from the E.U. He also served as Chairman of the Board of Directors of the Research Promotion Foundation and as Vice President of the Cyprus Development Bank.

He played an active role in the Student Movement where he served as the first founding president of the Pancyprian Federation of Students Unions, between the years 1973 to 1977.

He is the President of the Committee for the Cyprus Innovation Award, awarded every year by the Cyprus Employers and Industrialists Federation, aiming to continuously improve the competitiveness of the Cyprus enterprises and organizations.

In April 2009, he was appointed by the President of the Republic of Cyprus, as the Head of the Cyprus EU Presidency Secretariat, directly reporting to the President, responsible for the coordination of the preparations for the Cypriot Presidency of the Council of the EU in the second half of 2012. The Presidency rotates every six months and cooperation closer than before is provided for among the three Member States holding the Presidency in turn. The next Trio Presidency consists of Poland, Denmark and Cyprus (List of Presidencies until 2020) and the most important task for the three-Presidency team is to work out a common 18-month programme of the Trio.
