= Double Negative (artwork) =

Land art piece in Nevada by Michael Heizer

Coordinates: 36.61586°N 114.34455°W

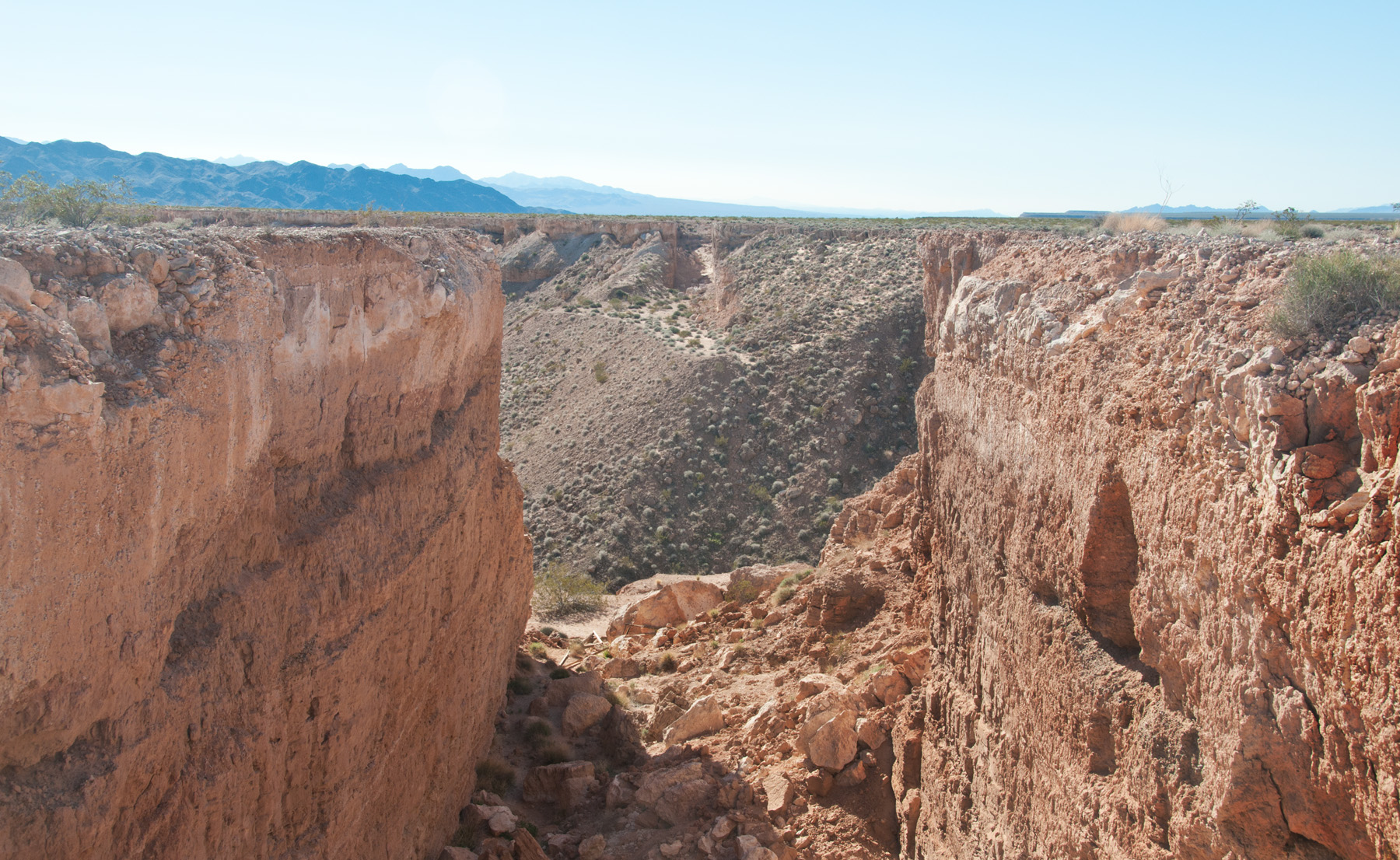
A view from the north trench, looking to the south

Double Negative is a piece of land art on the eastern edge of Mormon Mesa, overlooking the Virgin Valley, in rural Clark County, Nevada. It consists of a pair of trenches facing each other across a canyon. Double Negative was created in 1969 by artist Michael Heizer.

== Description ==
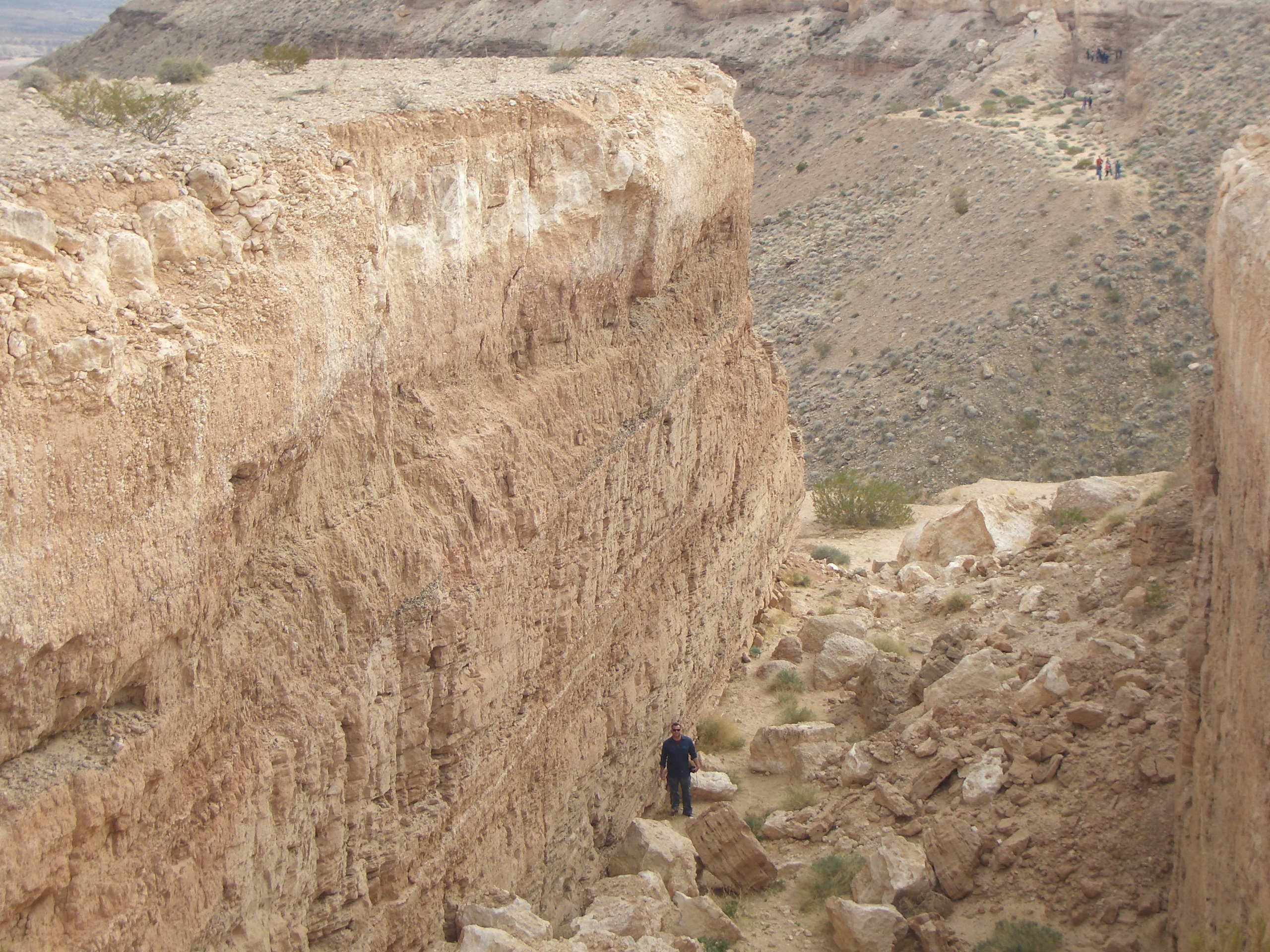
North trench with person for scale

The work consists of two long trenches in the earth, created by the displacement of 244,000 tons of rock, mostly rhyolite and sandstone. Each trench is 30 feet (9 m) wide and 50 feet (15 m) deep, and the distance between their far ends is 1500 feet (457 m). The trenches straddle either side of a natural canyon, into which the excavated material was dumped. The "negative" in the title thus refers in part to both the natural and man-made negative space that constitutes the work. The work essentially consists of what is not there, what has been displaced.

Double Negative can be reached by following Mormon Mesa Road north-eastward from Overton to the top of the mesa, continuing across it for 2.7 miles, turning left at the opposite edge onto a smaller path that extends along the rim of the mesa, and then following the path north for 1.3 miles.

== History ==
In 1969 the art dealer Virginia Dwan funded the purchase of the 60-acre site for Double Negative and, in turn, the artist transferred the property deeds to Dwan. In 1971 Heizer prevented the Dwan Gallery from selling the work. Dwan then donated Double Negative to the Los Angeles Museum of Contemporary Art (MoCA) in 1984, with Heizer's blessing, to coincide with "In Context: Michael Heizer, Geometric Extraction". The terms of the agreement specified that no conservation work should be undertaken, it being Heizer's desire that nature should eventually reclaim the land through weather and erosion. Since then, Heizer has expressed a contrasting wish to restore the piece, perhaps in opposition to Robert Smithson's support for the principle of entropy.

For the solo exhibition "In Context: Michael Heizer, Geometric Extraction", MoCA was able to include a photographic panorama of Heizer's work. For the large-scale, historical survey of land art "Ends of the Earth" at MoCA in 2012, Heizer did not want any representation of Double Negative to be included in the exhibition. A good aerial photograph appears in the catalogue, but Heizer reportedly worried that documentation in a museum gallery would misrepresent a sculpture that he felt could be known only through physical experience.

In 2021, plans for a solar development project near Double Negative were rejected due to resident protests against the project's effect on the artwork. The work is currently owned by MoCA and is accessible by four-wheel drive vehicle or motorcycle.
