= Leonardo Patterson =

Dealer in pre-Columbian artifacts

Leonardo Augustus Patterson (15 April 1942 – 11 February 2025) was a Costa Rican-born antiquities dealer. Specialising in Pre-Columbian artefacts, many of the items he sold were suspected to be fakes, and he was convicted of dealing fake artefacts by courts in the United States and Germany.

== Background ==
He was born on 15 April 1942 to Jamaican parents in Limón, Costa Rica, and was raised in Cahuita, Costa Rica. Patterson started work as an apprentice jeweller, moving on to work as an antiquities middle-man as he gained exposure to a wider range of objects, and graduating to the role of international dealer and collector.

== Career ==
Patterson began to deal on a large scale in New York in the 1960s and 1970s when restrictions on the trade in antiquities were loose. In the 1970s, restrictions were tightened on the export of archaeological artefacts as more countries took an interest in what was happening to their cultural heritage and in 1983 the United States signed a UNESCO convention on the illegal export of cultural property. In 1980 Patterson was involved in a multi-million dollar Australian tax avoidance scheme concerning a collection of unprovenanced Mesoamerican antiquities that were donated to the National Gallery of Victoria. In 1984 Patterson was charged by the FBI with attempting to sell a fake Maya fresco to an art dealer Wayne Anderson. His first conviction, Patterson was sentenced to probation. In 1985 he was convicted of importing the eggs of endangered sea turtles into the United States, and sentenced to probation. In 1995 he was appointed a cultural attaché to the United Nations, before questions about his past caused him to resign and he began to spend more time in Europe, particularly in Germany.

A number of legal cases followed including the return of items to Mexico and Peru, notably a gold Moche headdress in the form of an octopus recovered with the help of Michel van Rijn. In a 2015 trial in Germany, he was found guilty of dealing fake artifacts, was fined US$40,000, and sentenced to house arrest.

== Personal life and death ==
Patterson said he was the father of thirteen children from five women. He died in Bautzen, Saxony, Germany, on 11 February 2025, at the age of 82.
