= Menil Collection =

Art museum in Houston, Texas, US

Coordinates: 29°44′14″N 95°23′55″W

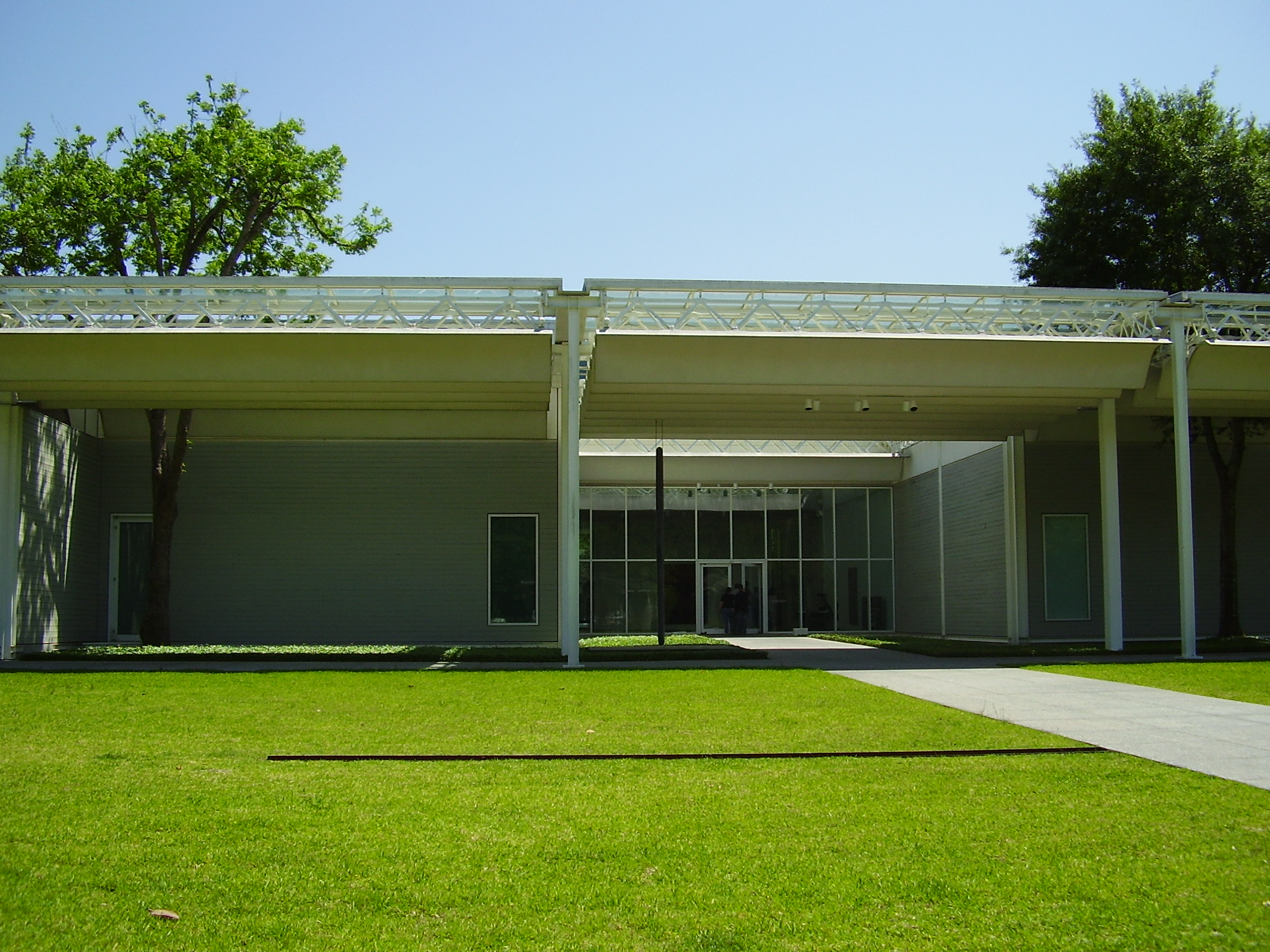
Menil Collection

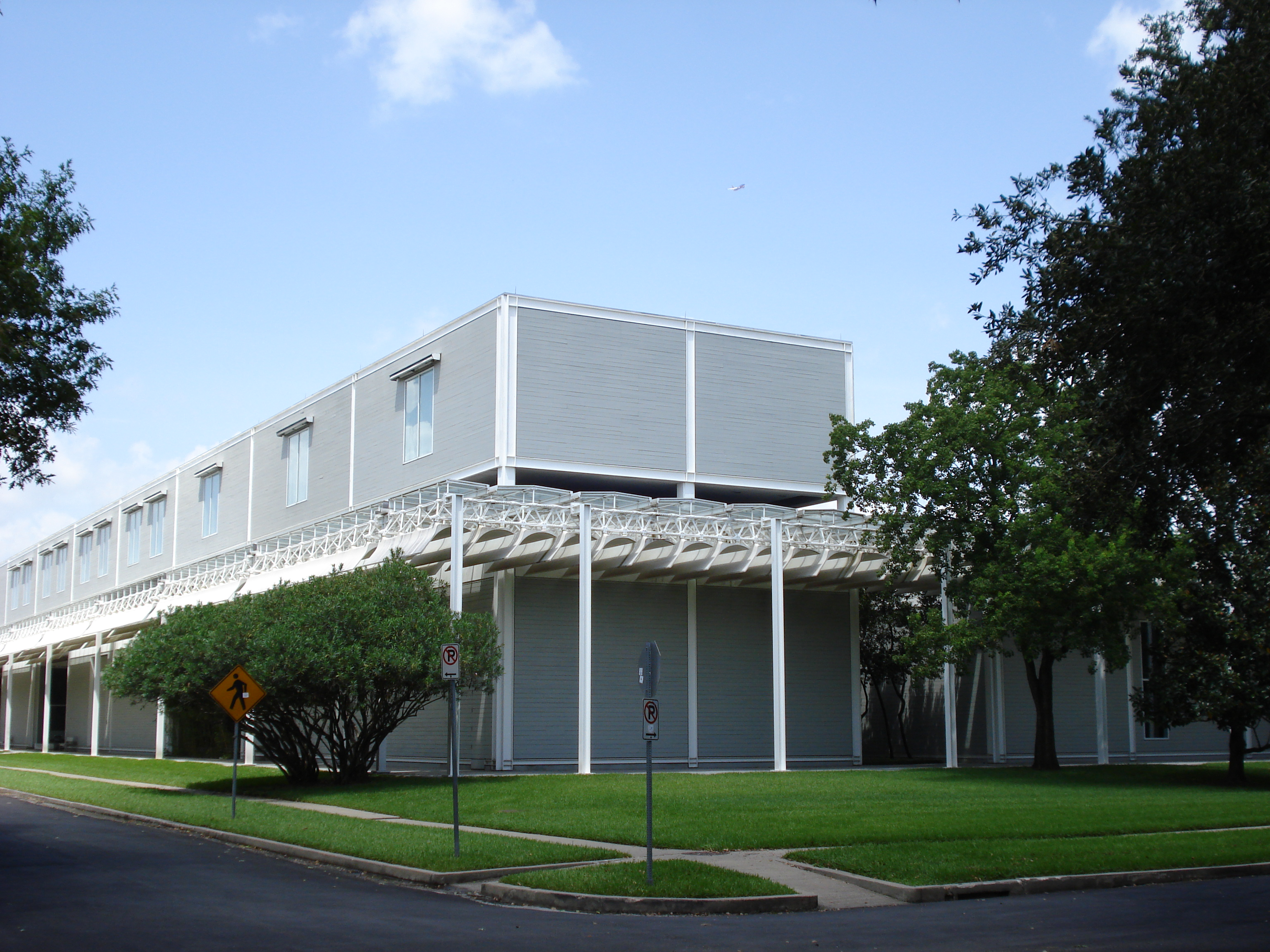
One corner of the Menil Collection

The Menil Collection, located in Houston, Texas, refers to the museum that houses the art collection of founders John de Menil and Dominique de Menil, or to the collection of paintings, sculptures, prints, drawings, photographs and rare books it houses, founded in 1987. The museum is said to rank with "the great private museums in the United States—the Frick in New York City, the Gardner in Boston, and the Phillips in Washington, D.C."

While the foundation of the collection is made up of a once-private collection, Menil Foundation, Inc. is a tax-exempt, nonprofit, public charity corporation formed under Section 501(c)3 of the Internal Revenue Code. Additionally, the Menil receives public funds granted by the City of Houston, the State of Texas, and the federal government through the National Endowment for the Arts.

== Collection ==
In 2014, about 16,000 permanent collection works are held on the museum campus. According to the website, the museum now has more than 25,000 objects. Only about 5% of the collection is exhibited at any given time. Collection rotation was desired by one of the founders: "it was one of Dominique de Menil's primary goals to rotate the works of art continually so that the public's experience in the museum would always be fresh."

The museum's holdings include early to mid-twentieth century works of Yves Tanguy, René Magritte, Max Ernst, Man Ray, Marcel Duchamp, Henri Matisse, Jackson Pollock, and Pablo Picasso, among others. Highlights include "Over 1,000 examples of Max Ernst's oeuvre and some of Rene Magritte's most highly regarded paintings."

The museum also maintains an extensive collection of contemporary art, including pop art and abstract expressionis, from Andy Warhol, Mark Rothko, Robert Rauschenberg, and Jasper Johns to Vija Celmins, Frank Stella, Donald Judd, and Cy Twombly, Jr., among others. The Menil also collects self-taught artists and documentary photographs.

Also included in the museum's permanent collection are antiquities, mainly classical (but also a few Near Eastern objects), and some works of Byzantine (mostly icons) and Medieval art. There is also a large tribal art collection.

The museum's holdings from Africa total more than 900 works, primarily from West and Central Africa, though works from half of Africa's countries are represented in the collection. Some of the most important African works, from France's former colonies, were acquired as early as the 1930s in Paris. The majority of the collection was put together between the 1950s and the 1970s. 115 African objects are illustrated and discussed in a 2008 catalogue titled African art from the Menil Collection.

The indigenous Americas collection is substantial, with more than 800 works. The collection stems from the interest of the founders, who lived in South America for several years. Collection strengths include objects from Mesoamerica, South America, the Pacific Northwest, and the Arctic. Additionally, objects from the Rock Foundation (founded by anthropologist Edmund Carpenter and Adelaide de Menil) are on long-term loan.

One room features a highly diverse group of objects, including found objects, natural objects, ethnographic objects, and Surrealist works. It is now called A Surrealist Kunstkammer. It was conceived by Carpenter, and first opened in 1999. On its website, the museum describes it as "an interpretive matrix" for understanding human psychology through Surrealism.

== History ==
The Renzo Piano-designed museum opened to the public in June 1987. It is governed by the Menil Foundation, Inc., a nonprofit charitable corporation established in 1954, whose stated purpose was to promote understanding and culture, primarily through the arts. Initially, the Foundation also pursued land banking to stabilize the neighborhood surrounding the museum, and structured the administration and operations of the collection. Dominique de Menil (a member of the Schlumberger family) served as first president; early board members included the Menils' son Francois, daughter Philippa Pellizzi, Malcolm McCorquodale, Edmund Snow Carpenter, Miles Rudolph Glaser, and Mickey Leland. Dominique de Menil ran the museum until her death in December 1997. In 2016, Rebecca Rabinow replaced Josef Helfenstein as director of the museum.

The future couple met at a ball at Versailles in 1930. At that time, Jean Marie Joseph Menu de Ménil (who subsequently Americanized his name) was 26 year-old baron. Dominique was the daughter of Conrad Schlumberger, who was a founder of the oil-drilling equipment company Schlumberger, which was the basis of the family fortune, which exceeded $100 million. Dominique converted to Catholicism, and they were married in 1931. The family settled in Houston in 1941, to escape the Nazi occupation of France.

The de Menils' most important mentor was a Dominican priest named Father Marie-Alaine Couturier. He taught them about modern art, with a strong interest in spirituality. He also advised them that with their great wealth, they should buy art and share it with the public. By the time of John de Menil's death in 1973, the couple had collected 10,000 art objects.

== Campus and neighborhood ==
The museum campus has grown to include four satellite galleries to the main building: Cy Twombly Gallery (also designed by Piano); the Dan Flavin Installation at Richmond Hall, which houses Dominique de Menil's last commission (a series of three site-specific installations by Dan Flavin that were installed in 1998); the Byzantine Fresco Chapel; and the Menil Drawing Institute. Another building founded by the Menils, but now operating as an independent foundation, is the Rothko Chapel.

The Menil Foundation began buying bungalow-style homes in the area in the 1960s, painting each the same shade of gray to establish a commonality. When the museum building was constructed, it was painted what has become known as "Menil gray," to coordinate with the bungalows.

In 2013, the landscape architect Michael Van Valkenburgh was appointed to enhance and expand the Menil Collection’s 30-acre (12-hectare) campus. The master site plan, by David Chipperfield Architects, called for the creation of additional green space and walkways, a cafe, and new buildings for art.

== Admission ==
The Menil Collection is open to the public, and admission is free. The museum is open Wednesday through Sunday, from 11 am to 7 pm. It is located near the University of St. Thomas, in the Montrose (Neartown) area of Houston.

=== The Byzantine Fresco Chapel ===
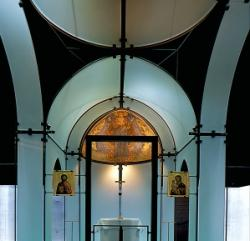
Interior of the Byzantine Fresco Chapel showing the glass church

Located in a separate building near the main collection, the Byzantine Fresco Chapel formerly housed two 13th century Byzantine church frescoes, an apse semi-dome of the Virgin Panagia and a dome featuring a depiction of Christ, known as Christ Pantocrator. After having been removed from a church in Lysi (in Turkish-occupied North Cyprus) by the illegal art trade, they were recovered during the 1980s. According to the museum, they were the only such frescoes in the Americas. They were held at the museum by agreement with their owners, the Church of Cyprus.

In September 2011 the Menil Collection announced that the frescoes would be permanently returned to Cyprus in February 2012, an example of art repatriation. In January 2015, the Menil disclosed its plans to reuse the former consecrated chapel space as a site for long-term contemporary installation work. The first exhibition in the reopened space is "The Infinity Machine", a new work commissioned by the Menil by Janet Cardiff and George Bures Miller.

=== Cy Twombly Gallery ===
In 1992, Renzo Piano was commissioned by Dominique de Menil to build a small, independent pavilion dedicated to the work of Cy Twombly, Jr. in the grounds of the Menil Collection. In contrast to the Menil’s main museum building and the surrounding bungalows, the Cy Twombly Gallery is built of sand-colored block concrete, is square in plan and contains nine galleries. Similar to the main museum, it is lit through the roof, with an external canopy of louvers, a sloping, hipped glass roof, and a fabric ceiling (to diffuse the light). The gift of works by Cy Twombly was announced in January 2025, comprising two paintings, described as "early keystones," and 121 drawings, from the Cy Twombly Foundation.

=== Menil Drawing Institute ===
The Menil Drawing Institute, opened in 2018, is the first ground-up building in the United States dedicated to the exhibition, study, storage and conservation of modern and contemporary artworks on paper, according to the Menil Collection. In 2016, two Menil trustees, Janie C. Lee and Louisa Stude Sarofim, promised a collection of 110 drawings made by 41 artists.

Los Angeles–based architecture firm Johnston Marklee and New York–based landscape architecture firm Michael Van Valkenburgh Associates designed the Drawing Institute. They worked in close collaboration with the New York–based structural engineering firm Guy Nordenson and Associates. Johnston Marklee was selected to design it after winning a competition that also included David Chipperfield, SANAA and Tatiana Bilbao. Rhode Island–based Gilbane Building Company, a subsidiary of Gilbane, Inc., was selected as the general contractor.

The $40-million building, with a total of 30,000 square feet (2,800 square meters) on two floors, one of them below ground, is located near the southern edge of the Menil campus, adjacent to the Cy Twombly Gallery and north of the Dan Flavin Installation. Modestly scaled, the flat-roofed building tops out at 16 feet (4.9 metres), no taller than the neighboring gray bungalows on the 30-acre (12-hectare) campus. Half of its space is for underground storage, while the ground level will contain a large, flexible central living room, about 3,000 square feet (280 square meters) of exhibition space, a scholar's cloister, rooms for seminars and other events, and a conservation lab, all wrapped around three courtyards.

== Vandalism ==
On June 13, 2012, a 22-year-old museum visitor named Uriel Landeros defaced an original Picasso at the museum, Woman in a Red Armchair, using black spray paint to stencil a bull and a matador and the word Conquista on the work of art. The vandal, a self-proclaimed artist, said that he did it to make a statement, and did not intend to destroy the painting. Landeros was sentenced to two years in prison for felony graffiti and criminal mischief.

== Management ==
=== Menil Foundation ===
The museum continues to be governed by the Menil Foundation. The foundation has been solely responsible for acquisition funds, which during the first years averaged more than $1 million annually, and operating disbursements of between $2.7 million and $2.9 million a year. Nearly half of the money for the museum building was derived from outside sources in Houston, in particular the Cullen Foundation and the Brown Foundation, which contributed $5 million each. By 2001, the Menil Foundation's endowment was $200 million. The budget pays in part for the museum's operation and for exhibitions, research, and catalogs.

Brown & Root heir Louisa Stude Sarofim was president of the Menil Collection and Foundation starting in 1998, following the death of Dominique de Menil. She has since become one of the museum's largest donors. The Board of Trustees includes, among others, Suzanne Deal Booth.

=== Directors ===
The museum's first director was Walter Hopps. Before joining the Menil Collection as director in 1983, he had worked with Mrs. de Menil on planning the museum and its program. Between 1999 and 2003, Ned Rifkin served as the museum's director; during his time in office, there were frequent clashes over the museum's direction and whether Rifkin was departing from the vision of its founder. Josef Helfenstein was named director in 2004. Until his departure in 2015, the Menil doubled its annual attendance, increased its endowment by almost 54 percent, and added more than 1,000 works to the collection, including pieces by Jasper Johns, Claes Oldenburg, Robert Rauschenberg, Richard Serra and Kara Walker.

== See also ==
- Bygones (1976)
- Charmstone (1991)
- Isolated Mass/Circumflex (Number 2) (1968–1978)
