= Robert Heizer =

American archaeologist (1915–1979)

Robert Fleming Heizer (July 13, 1915 – July 18, 1979) was an American archaeologist who conducted extensive fieldwork and reporting in California, the Southwestern United States, and the Great Basin. He is the father of sculpture artist Michael Heizer.

== Background ==
Robert Fleming Heizer was born on July 13, 1915, in Denver, Colorado, to Ott and Martha Madden Heizer. He spent most of his childhood in Lovelock, Nevada, where his lifelong interest in the cultures of Native Americans began. As a young boy, he collected artifacts in and around the area where he lived, but he did not participate in his first archaeological excavation until he attended Sacramento Junior College (1932–34).

When he graduated from Lovelock High School (1932) in a class of eleven students, he was not eligible to attend the University of California at Berkeley because some of the required courses were not offered at Lovelock High. While registering for classes at Sacramento Junior College, a faculty member learned of his interest in archaeology and took him out of line to meet the president of the college, Jeremiah Beverley Lilliard, who shared a similar interest. Subsequently, Heizer became a protégé of Lilliard.

After two years, Heizer transferred to the University of California at Berkeley, where he earned a Bachelor of Arts with high honors in 1936. At that time, there was little interest in local archaeology at Berkeley, so Heizer worked with the only graduate student in the field, Waldo Wedel. He also participated in fieldwork with Alex Krieger and other scholars in Nevada, receiving financial assistance from Francesca Blackmer Wigg.

While in the graduate program, Heizer worked with many professors, including Alfred L. Kroeber, who assigned Heizer to write his dissertation on Aboriginal Whaling in the Old and New World. In 1941, Heizer received his doctorate from Berkeley. In 1940, he married Nancy Elizabeth Jenkins, and they had three children—two sons, Stephen and Michael, and one daughter, Sydney. Robert and Nancy Heizer divorced in 1975.

== Career ==
Upon receiving his doctorate, Heizer taught for a year at the University of Oregon. During World War II, he worked at the Kaiser Shipyards in Richmond, California, as a marine pipefitter. After the war, he taught at the University of California, Los Angeles (1945–46) and then began his thirty-year career at Berkeley, going from Assistant Professor (1946) to Associate Professor (1948) and finally full Professor (1952). While teaching, he worked closely with both undergraduate and graduate students, who helped inspire A Guide to Field Methods in Archaeology (1949) and The Archaeologists at Work (1959). He also organized and directed the University of California Archaeological Survey (1948–60), which conducted many major excavations and various field studies around the state and produced 75 volumes in its Reports series. Dr. Heizer retired from teaching in 1979 and died later that year at the age of 64.

== Awards and honors ==
Heizer received many awards and honors during his lifetime. He received an Honorary Doctorate of Sciences from the University of Nevada in 1965; two Guggenheim fellowships in 1963 and 1973; a year as a fellow in the Center for Advanced Study in Behavioral Science from 1972–1973; an award for having distinguished scholarly contributions from the Southwestern Anthropological Association in 1976; awarded the Henry R. Wagner Medal of the California Historical Society in 1977; and was elected to the National Academy of Sciences in 1973.

== Key excavations and studies ==
Heizer's excavations included the Cooper-Molera Adobe Project in Monterey County, California, from 1971 to 1978. He did work in the Sacramento Valley from 1936 to 1939, and in later years at Lovelock Cave, Humboldt Cave, and Eastgate Cave, all in Nevada. His primary area of study was the Great Basin of the United States. Heizer decided early on that more was going on in the west 10,000 years ago, although in the 1950s and 1960s it was widely accepted that there was not much going on. He had never traveled out of the United States until he went to Tabasco to work at the La Venta site in 1955, examining the Olmec society with his colleague Philip Drucker, who had contacted him about his findings there. There they found large stone monuments in the shapes of faces and statues. They also uncovered a shrine that was buried on purpose because of its sacredness. One of his lesser known, but highly important studies was the continuation of the work of C. Hart Merriam. Merriam spent a great deal of his life doing fieldwork on the Native Americans of California. After his death Merriam's family donated all his materials to the Anthropology Department at the University of California at Berkeley where Heizer and Kroeber took over the studies. Heizer had over 1,000 of Merriam's articles published so others could learn from them.

== Research emphases ==
Most of Heizer's research was in prehistoric and historic Native American peoples of the western United States, particularly in Nevada and California. He conducted numerous analyses of preserved materials from the caves in Nevada, particularly fossil feces or coprolites, which helped determine what the human diet consisted of and dietary changes over time. Heizer also helped lay the groundwork for scientific applications in archaeology. This research included involvement with radiocarbon dating during the 1950s, and trace elements analysis of obsidian artifacts in the 1960s and 1970s. He was never one to focus exclusively on theory, but was interested in discovering basic facts and methods in research areas of interest. Heizer also used neutron activation analysis to determine trace elements on samples from his excavations in Mexico, one of the applications of this method. He then used the same idea when he tested petroglyphs.

== Selected works ==
Heizer wrote hundreds of different works in the course of his lifetime. He wrote 415 papers, reprinted papers, reports and prefaces. He also wrote 30 books (authored and co-authors) and 53 different book reviews, and was a part of 2 films.

== Selected articles and monographs ==
- A Unique Type of Fishhook from Central California 1937 Southwest Museum The Masterkey 11; 96-97
- A "Folsom-like" Point from the Sacramento Valley 1938 Southwest Museum The Masterkey 12; 180-182
- A Complete Atlatl Dart from Pershing County, Nevada 1938 New Mexican Anthropologist Volume 2: 70-71
- A Note on Folsom and Nepesta Points 1940 American Antiquity 6(1): 79
- The Origin and Authenticity of an Atlatl Dart from Lassen County, California 1941 American Antiquity, Vol. 7, No. 2, pp. 134–141
- The Use of Narcotic Mushrooms by Primitive Peoples 1944 Ciba Symposium vol. 5(2):1713–1716
- Archaeological Dating by Chemical Analysis of Bone, by Cook, Sherburne Friend Heizer, Robert Fleming 1953 Southwestern Journal of Anthropology 231-238
- A San Nicolas Island Twined Basketry Water Bottle 1960 University of California Archaeological Survey pg 1-3
- Specific and Generic Characteristics of Olmec Culture 1958–60 Proceedings of the International Congress of Americanists . v. 2. pp. 178–182
- Inference on the Nature of Olmec Society Based upon Data from the La Venta Site 1961–62 Kroeber Anthropological Society 25:43-57
- Archaeology of Hum-67, the Gunther Island Site in Humboldt Bay, California: Correspondence 1948–66 Reports of the University of California Archaeological Survey 62:5-122
- Biological and Cultural Evidence from Prehistoric Coprolites 1969 Science Vol. 165 no. 3893 pp. 563–568
- A Question of Ethics in Archaeology—One Archaeologist's View 1974 The Journal of California Anthropology 145-151

== Selected books ==
- Francis Drake and the California Indians, 1579 University of California Press 1947
- A Manual of Archaeological Field Methods; Prepared for Use by the California Archaeological Survey of the University of California and the Department of Anthropology at Berkeley, edited by Heizer, Robert Fleming The National Press 1949
- The California Indians, edited by Heizer, Robert Fleming and Whipple, Mary Ann 1947–70 University of California Press
- The Four Ages of Tsurai; A Documentary History of the Indian Village on Trinidad Bay, by Heizer, Robert Fleming Trinidad Museum Society
- A Guide to Archaeological Field Methods (revised edition of A Manual of Archaeological Field Methods) The National Press
- The Archaeologist at Work; A Source Book in Archaeological Method and Interpretation 1957–60 Greenwood Press
- An Introduction to Prehistoric Archaeology, by Hole, Frank Heizer, and Robert Fleming Holt, Rinehart and Winston Publisher
- Languages, Territories, and Names of California Indian Tribes 1966 University of California Press
- To Make My Name Good: A Reexamination of the Southern Kwakiutl Potlatch (Original title: Southern Kwakiutl Potlatch) by Drucker, Philip Heizer, and Robert Fleming 1965–67 University of California Press
- Almost Ancestors: The First Californians, by Kroeber, Theodora and Heizer, Robert F. 1969 Brick House Publishing Company
- The Other Californians; Prejudice and Discrimination under Spain, Mexico and the United States to 1920, by Heizer, Robert Fleming University of California Press
- The Destruction of California Indians; Collection of Documents from the Period 1847–1965 in Which are Described Some of the Things that Happened to Some of the Indians of California, edited by Heizer, Robert Fleming Bison Books Publisher
- The Costanoan Indians: An Assemblage of Papers on the Language and Culture of the Costanoan Indians who in Aboriginal Times Occupied San Francisco, San Mateo, Santa Clara, Alameda and Parts Of Contra Costa, Monterey and San Benito Counties, edited by Heizer, Robert Fleming 1974. De Anza College Press

== Death ==
Heizer died July 18, 1979. He first entered in the hospital in 1978 for cancer, but his health had been declining for several months before. He fought hard against the disease, and despite the handicaps it put on him he continued to teach and conduct research up until a few days before his death.
