= Isolated Mass/Circumflex (Number 2) =

Sculpture in Houston, Texas, U.S.

Isolated Mass/Circumflex (#2)
- Artist: Michael Heizer
- Year: 1968–1978
- Location: Houston, Texas, United States; 29°44′16″N 95°23′55″W

Isolated Mass/Circumflex (Number 2), stylized as Isolated Mass/Circumflex (#2), is an outdoor 1968–1978 sculpture by Michael Heizer, installed outside the Menil Collection in Houston, Texas, United States. The work is one of several by Heizer in the Menil Collection.

== See also ==
- 1978 in art
- List of public art in Houston
