= Tasoula Hadjitofi =

Cypriot cultural heritage advocate

Tasoula Hadjitofi (born 1959) is a Cypriot cultural heritage advocate, anti-corruption campaigner, entrepreneur, NGO founder, author, and former Honorary Consul of Cyprus in the Netherlands. She is known for her involvement in efforts to recover looted religious artifacts from Cyprus, particularly in connection with the 1997 Munich police operation concerning illicit trafficking of Byzantine icons.

She is the founder of Octagon Professionals International, headquartered in the Netherlands, as well as the non-profit organization Walk of Truth, the initiative Culture Crime Watchers Worldwide (CCWW), and the Hadjitofi Foundation in the United Kingdom.

== Career and cultural heritage work ==
=== Appointment as Honorary Consul ===
In 1987, Hadjitofi was appointed Honorary Consul of Cyprus in the Netherlands. She was the first woman and the youngest individual to hold the position at the time.

During the same period, she was approached by Dutch art dealer Michel van Rijn, who provided information concerning the location of looted Cypriot cultural objects. This encounter marked the beginning of her involvement in addressing the illicit trafficking of cultural property.

Also in 1987, Hadjitofi founded Octagon Professionals International in The Hague.

=== Recovery of Cypriot cultural artifacts ===
In 1989, Hadjitofi was granted power of attorney by the Church of Cyprus to represent it in matters related to the recovery and restitution of looted ecclesiastical heritage.

In October 1997, German police raided properties linked to Turkish art dealer Aydin Dikmen in Munich, uncovering thousands of stolen cultural objects, many of Cypriot origin. The case developed into prolonged legal proceedings in Germany, resulting in court decisions ordering the return of artifacts to Cyprus.

Recovered artifacts are exhibited at the Byzantine Museum in Nicosia and the Cyprus Museum.

=== Additional restitutions and advocacy ===
Between the late 1990s and 2010s, Hadjitofi was involved in additional recovery efforts concerning Cypriot religious artifacts located in Europe.

She has participated in discussions related to cultural heritage protection at venues including the Peace Palace in The Hague and debates in the UK Parliament concerning ratification of the Hague Convention for the Protection of Cultural Property in the Event of Armed Conflict.

== Walk of Truth ==
Hadjitofi founded Walk of Truth, a non-profit organization focused on combating illicit trafficking of cultural property and promoting restitution practices.

== Culture Crime Watchers ==
Culture Crime Watchers Worldwide (CCWW) is an initiative associated with Walk of Truth that focuses on public awareness concerning cultural heritage crime and illicit trafficking.

== Octagon Professionals International ==
In 1987, Hadjitofi founded Octagon Professionals International, a human resources and professional services company based in The Hague, Netherlands.

The company provides services including international recruitment, payroll administration, employer-of-record solutions, and workforce mobility support for companies operating across borders.

According to media coverage, the firm works with multinational companies and international organisations in Europe, supporting cross-border employment and labour compliance.

== The Hadjitofi Foundation ==
In 2025, Hadjitofi established the Hadjitofi Foundation, a charitable organization based in London focused on cultural heritage restitution and ethical repatriation practices.

== Honors and recognition ==
Hadjitofi has received recognition related to her work in cultural heritage protection, including the Order of St Barnabas from the Church of Cyprus.

== See also ==
- Illicit antiquities trade
- Cultural heritage preservation
- Michel van Rijn
