= Lysi =

Lysi: Λύση (Greek); Akdoğan (Turkish)
- Municipality
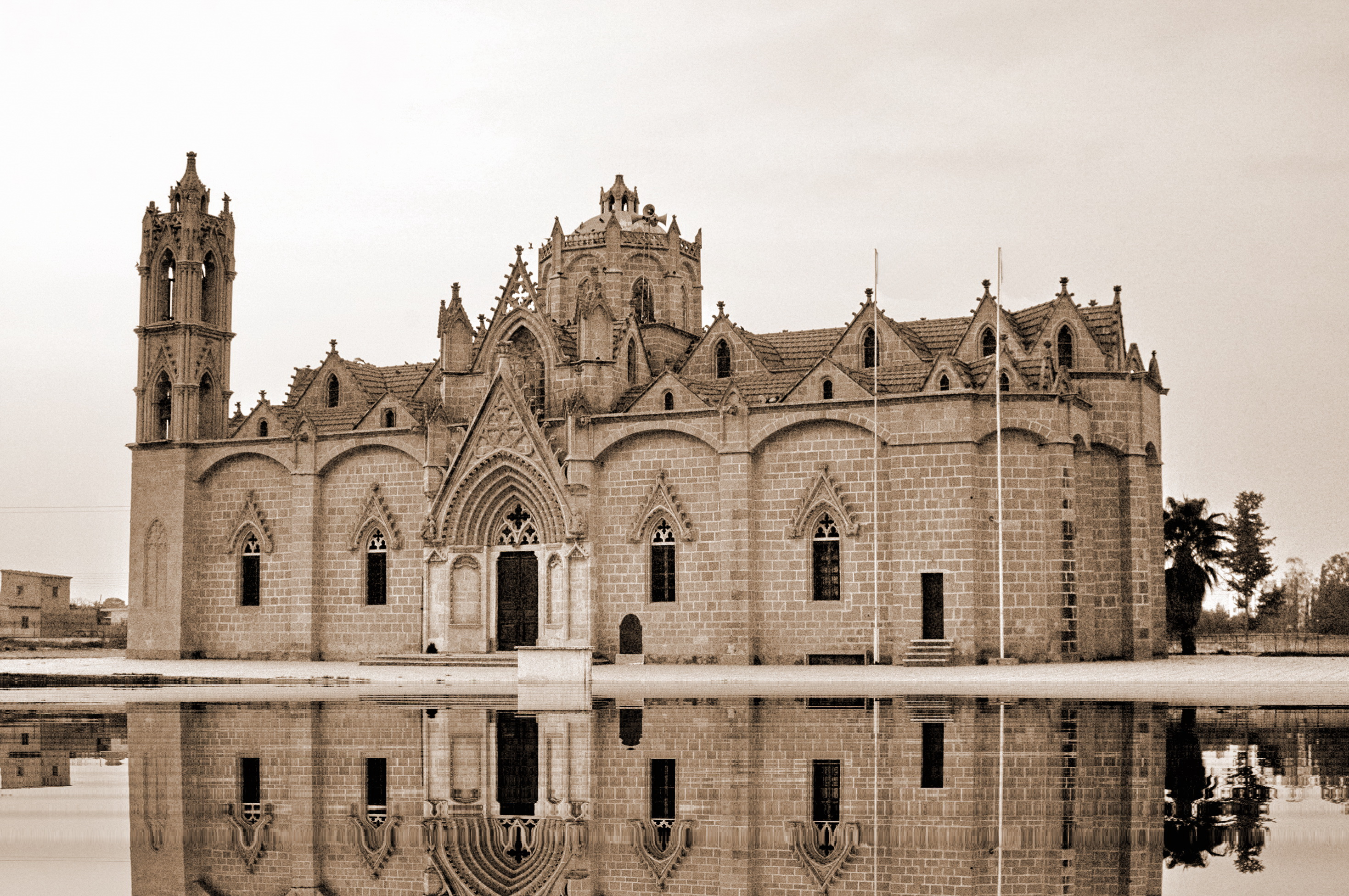
- Church of Panagia in Lysi

- Location in Cyprus
- Coordinates: 35°6′19″N 33°40′52″E
- Country (de jure): Cyprus
  - District: Famagusta District
- Country (de facto): Northern Cyprus
  - District: Gazimağusa District

Government
  - Mayor: Ahmet Latif

Population (2011)
  - Total: 2,471
- Time zone: UTC+2 (EET)
  - Summer (DST): UTC+3 (EEST)
- Website: Turkish Cypriot municipality

Lysi (Greek: Λύση; Turkish: Akdoğan or Lisi) is a village located in the Mesaoria plain in Cyprus, north of the city of Larnaca. It is under the de facto control of Northern Cyprus. Lysi is also the administration center for the villages of Beyarmudu, Paşaköy, Pile and Vadili.

In 1960, there were 3,700 Greek Cypriots living in the village and approximately 6,000 in 1974, when they all fled because of the Turkish invasion and the subsequent partition of the island. The arrival of Turkish settlers from mainland Turkey and of Turkish Cypriots displaced from other villages in the southern part of Cyprus changed the demographics of the village.

In the centre of the village there is a late 19th-century Greek Orthodox church, covered in a thick layer of Gothic decoration copied from the great medieval cathedrals of Famagusta and Nicosia. The church was built by the inhabitants of Lysi who volunteered their work over several years. After the Turkish occupation of Lysi the church was looted, all its Christian icons and other Christian interior decorations were removed and the church was turned into a mosque.

The diminutive 14th-century church of St. Evphemianos, 2 km (1.2 mi) southwest of the village, enjoys a lonely position, shaded by a clump of eucalyptus just above a water course. This small church depicted some of the most beautiful and well-preserved Byzantine mosaics found on the island of Cyprus. The mosaics were later purchased by the Menil Foundation in Texas, USA on behalf of the Church of Cyprus and have been on long-term loan to the Menil ever since. The loan agreement came to an end in February 2012. West of the village, 2 km (1.2 mi) along the tarmac road to Arsos village, there is a distinctive hillock capped with rounded boulders. Halfway down its southern face is a Greek Archaic nympheum, a small natural cave that archaeologists found filled with votive statuettes. The silhouette of the sibyl's hill hovers as a visual echo of the Pentadaktylos mountains on the northern horizon.

About 4 km (2.5 mi) farther west along this road, the other side of Arsos, is the hamlet of Tremetousia, the site of Richard the Lion Heart’s victory over Isaac Comnenus. The ruinous church and the buildings on the northern edge are the remains of an 18th-century rebuilding of the ancient monastery of St Spyridon. The remains of the saint lay buried here for a few centuries before being removed to Constantinople, and eventually to the island of Corfu.

== Notable people ==
- Andreas Moleskis
- Grigoris Afxentiou

== See also ==
- Church of St. Euphemianos
