= Ralph Rosenborg =

American painter (1913–1992)

- Born: Ralph Mozart Rosenborg; June 9, 1913; New York City, U.S.
- Died: October 22, 1992 (aged 79); Portland, Oregon, U.S.

Ralph Rosenborg (1913–1992) was an American artist whose paintings were described as both expressionist and abstract and who was a colleague of the New York Abstract Expressionists in the 1940s and 1950s. Unlike them, however, he preferred to make small works and tended to explicitly draw upon natural forms and figures for his abstract subjects. Called a "highly personal artist," he developed a unique style that was considered to be both mystical and magic. His career was exceptionally long, covering more than 50 years and his output was correspondingly large.

== Early life and training ==
Rosenborg was born in Brooklyn, New York, on June 9, 1913. In 1929, while he was a high school student, he began to work with the designer, artist, and instructor, Henriette Reiss. When Rosenborg encountered her, Reiss was serving as an instructor for the School Art League in the American Museum of Natural History. (Note: An outgrowth of the New York Art Committee of the Public Education Association, the School Art League was a philanthropic organization that worked closely with the city public school system and its museums to advance art literacy through lectures, demonstrations, studio classes, awards, and scholarships to students in elementary and high schools. The league was founded in 1909 and was still in existence in 2018.) She was then engaged in instructing both students and their teachers in the city school system by a method she called Rhythmic Design. She believed inspiration for abstract designs could be found in rhythms—rhythms that could be perceived in ordinary perceptions much as they are when listening to music. She said the rhythms of a musical composition might inspire a graphic pattern of forms and colors and in the same way rhythms perceived in a sunset or the ripples of a stream might be translated into a graphic design: anything seen, heard, or read might furnish an idea for a symbolic interpretation. She believed that rhythm is present everywhere and that students could be trained to sense its various manifestations. (Note: Henriette Reiss (1889-1992) was born in England of Swiss parents. She was raised in Switzerland and studied painting, sculpture, and design in Munich, Basel, and Liverpool. In 1913 she moved to the United States with her husband, the painter Winold Reiss, and, after their divorce in 1923, became well-known first as a designer and then as the inventor of a method of art instruction she called the Henriette Reiss Method of Rhythmic Design. After teaching many years in the School Art League and other related positions, she ended her career as an instructor at the Fashion Institute of Technology.) In May 1930 Reiss selected a drawing by Rosenborg to be shown in an exhibition of creative design by City high school students. (Note: The students' drawings were shown first at the American Museum of Natural History and later in Grand Central Palace. Contributing organizations included the School Art League Saturday morning class, taught by Reiss; the New York Evening School of Industrial Art, directed by Jennie Greenberg; and the Girls' Commercial High School, taught by Margaret Rigney.) From 1930 to 1933, aged 17 to 20, Rosenborg studied with Reiss in what Vivian Raynor of the New York Times called a "pupil-apprentice" relationship. During this time she instructed him in music appreciation, literature, and art history as well as giving technical training in art.

== Career in art ==
Ralph Rosenborg, Abstracts in Blues and Greens, 1937, watercolor and ink, 10.5 x 13.75 inches

Ralph Rosenborg, The Far-away City, 1941, oil on linen, 18 x 24 inches

Ralph Rosenborg, American Landscape, 1972, oil on canvas, 16 x 20 inches

Ralph Rosenborg, Landscape with Pink, Green, and Blue, 1982, watercolor, 10 x 14 inches

In April 1934 Rosenborg was one of 1,500 artists to participate in the annual Salons of America exhibition, which was held that year in Rockefeller Center's RCA Building. Each paid two dollars for the privilege of hanging up to three works and none was given prominence over the others. The New York Times reported that by the time the show closed a month later, some 30,000 people had viewed it. (Note: Founded in 1922 by Hamilton Easter Field, Salons of America aimed to give artists an alternative to the Society of Independent Artists whose financial and publicity methods he found objectionable. A reporter said he aimed "to give equal opportunity to every member, whether he or she be a conservative or a post-Dadaist.") The following year he was given a solo exhibition (his first) at the Lounge Gallery of the Eighth Street Playhouse. (Note: The gallery, sometimes called the Lounge Gallery and sometimes the Playhouse Gallery, was located in the Eighth Street Playhouse in Greenwich Village. Originally called the Film Guild Cinema, the playhouse was the first theater built exclusively to show movies. In 1933 it began giving exhibitions in joint sponsorship with Vernon C. Porter's Artists' Aid Committee. The committee selected artists who had difficulty finding places in which to show their work and charged them no fee of any kind. Although it held occasional group shows, it specialized in giving solo shows to young artists who could not otherwise obtain gallery space. By 1938, 120 artists had been given their first solo exhibitions there.) The year after that he participated in a group show held by the Municipal Art Committee and in 1937 was given a second solo exhibition, this time in the Artists Gallery, which, like the Lounge Gallery, specialized in shows of deserving young artists who were unable to show in New York's commercial galleries. (Note: Mayor Fiorello La Guardia established the Municipal Art Committee in the fall of 1934 to provide employment for New York's musicians, performers, artists, and other out-of-work arts workers. Groups of artists submitted applications to the committee and its galleries' exhibitions were changed every two months.) (Note: Founded by Hugh S. Stix in 1936 and run by Frederica Beer, the Artists Gallery was supported by donations and charged no fees on artists' sales.) That year he also became a founding member of and participated in a group show held by American Abstract Artists, a loose assembly of artists that aimed to promote abstract art and artists in New York. (Note: Calling the exhibition "an often resounding mass demonstration of decorative design," Edward Alden Jewell of the New York Times said most of the works derived from European sources and showed little individuality.) At roughly the same time Rosenborg associated himself with a group of abstractionists that called itself "The Ten" and in May 1938 joined with its other members in what would be his first appearance in a commercial gallery: the Gallery Georgette Passedoit. (Note: Only one other member of The Ten, Louis Schanker, was also in American Abstract Artists. Formed in 1935 The Ten were considered to be both abstract and expressionist, although the term "abstract expressionist" was not then in current use. Despite the name, it did not usually have ten members. There were only nine in the original group and when Rosenborg joined them there were only eight. Founding members were Ben-Zion, Ilya Bolotowsky, Adolph Gottlieb, Louis Harris, Jack Kufeld, Marcus Rothkowitz (later known as Mark Rothko), Louis Schanker, Joseph Solman, and Nahum Tschacbasov.) (Note: Noting an overall sombre tone in this show, the critic for the New York Sun said "the names of the artists suggest recent acclimatization and it is not always at once that newcomers pass into the glories and joys of living in America.") In 1938 he his work appeared in a group show at the Lounge Gallery, in 1939 in group shows at the Artists Gallery and (with other members of The Ten) at the Bonestell Gallery, and in 1940 yet another group show (with other members of American Abstract Artists) at the American Fine Arts Building. (Note: Lounge 1938, Artists Gallery 1938, Bonestell 1939, American Fine Arts 1940)

During this period Rosenborg began an association with an art dealer, Marian Guthrie Willard, that would last into the war years. (Note: Willard married Dan Rhodes Johnson in the early 1940s thus becoming Marian Willard Johnson.) Willard was known for selecting artists whose work she admired without regard to their commercial potential. She aimed to nurture the careers of young artists whose work, as she put it, made "a personal statement as well as a vision of the universal." In 1938 Rosenborg's paintings were included in group shows at her East River Gallery, in 1939 at a gallery she ran jointly with J.B Neumann called the Neumann-Willard Gallery, in 1942 at the Willard Gallery, and in 1943 at the same place. (Note: East River, Neumann-Willard, 1942 Willard, 1943 Willard) Willard gave Rosenborg solo shows in February and November 1941.

Rosenborg never had an exclusive long-term relationship with a commercial gallery. Throughout his career his work appeared in both group and solo shows in a wide variety of galleries and museums both in New York and elsewhere in the United States. Examples include the Phillips Memorial Gallery (group, 1941), Yale University Art Gallery (group, 1942), Brandt (group, 1944), the Pinacotheca (solo, 1945), Troeger-Phillips (solo, 1946), Chinese Gallery (solos, 1946 and 1947), Art Institute of Chicago (group, 1948), Corcoran Gallery of Art (groups, 1949 and 1959) Seligmann (solo, 1950), Davis (solos, 1953 and 1954), Delacorte (solo, 1955), and Landry (solo, 1959, 1960, and 1962). (Note: Phillips, Yale, Brandt, Pinacotheca, Troeger-Phillips, Chinese, Art Institute of Chicago, Corcoran, Seligmann, Davis, Delacorte, Landry) He contributed paintings to exhibitions at the Whitney Museum of American Art in 1946, 1953, 1956, 1957, 1976, and 1990. He was given retrospective exhibitions in 1982 at the Schlesinger-Boisanté Gallery and in 1983 at the Princeton Gallery of Fine Art.

=== Artistic style and critical reception ===
During the 1930s and 1940s, Rosenborg moved freely between expressionist watercolors evocative of the rhythms and colors of nature (such as the Untitled watercolor of about 1938) and more consciously structured oils, such as The Far-away City, in which deep-toned, dream-world landscapes take on the color and architecture of expressive stained glass. He paid little heed to modernist theories of surface and structure that fascinated many of his contemporaries. Later during the 1950s, Rosenborg's paintings increasingly reflected the energies, as well as the appearances, of the natural world. Tumultuous seascapes, serene landscapes, and brightly colored floral still lifes, were all executed with an attention to richly textured, heavily painted surfaces.

— Virginia M. Mecklenburg, The Patricia and Phillip Frost Collection: American Abstraction 1930–1945 (Washington, D.C.: Smithsonian Institution Press for the National Museum of American Art, 1989)

Unlike better-known abstract expressionists, Rosenborg made small paintings and gave preference to gouaches and watercolors over oils. From his mentor, Henriette Reiss, he had learned a style of abstraction that involved symbolic interpretation of natural rhythms. Critics noted a preference for a gestural abstraction rather than a geometrical one. They also saw a persistent use of symbols, noting a similarity to the work of Wassily Kandinsky and Paul Klee. (Note: See, for example, New York Post May 14, 1938, New York Times November 9, 1941, and New York Times November 11, 1946) Throughout his career critics further saw a distinct lyricism in Rosenborg's work. (Note: See, for example, New York Times July 5, 1936, New York Sun May 14, 1938, New York Times November 11, 1945, and New York Times October 15, 1982) Rosenborg's 1937 watercolor, "Abstracts in Blues and Greens" (at left above) illustrates his early watercolor style. "The Far-away City" of 1941 (at right above) illustrates his early style in oils. "American Landscape" (at left above) illustrates his late style in oils. "Landscape with Pink, Green, and Blue" (at right above) illustrates his late watercolor style.

His early work obscured the natural forms that inspired them making critics see them as tending toward pure abstraction. In the early 1950s he made a transition to a more clearly figurative expression. These late works were said to give off an air of mystery. Writing of a solo show held at the Landry Gallery in October 1960, Stuart Preston of the New York Times said, "The essence of mystery and magic is exactly what distinguishes Ralph Rosenborg's meditative semi-abstract landscape water-colors... These are rapturous little acts of visual and manual concentration at first sight inscrutable and then revealing themselves to be precise and allusive. Writing about the same show, Bennett Schiff, critic for the New York Post, said "A mystical intensity and a beauty which burns in ruby and sapphire colors are in these fine paintings."

== Personal life and family ==
Rosenborg's birth name was Ralph Mozart Rosenborg. He was born on June 9, 1913, to Mozart Wolfgang Rosenborg (October 28, 1884 to March 4, 1932) and his wife Helen Rosenborg (September 20, 1888 to September 28, 1947). (Note: Mozart birth, Mozart death, Helen birth and death) Both parents were born in Sweden. Rosenborg's father emigrated to New York in 1903 and lived in New York City. During Rosenborg's childhood, he was a machinist. Later he earned his living as a stockroom man. His mother was sometimes a homemaker and sometimes earned a living as a cook. As a child he had hoped to play the violin, but private lessons were beyond his family's means. The art programs of the city's public schools and the privately funded Art School League gave him the opportunity for no-cost art training and brought him into contact with Henriette Reiss who became his mentor and supporter.

It is likely that sales of paintings never brought in enough money for Rosenborg to live on. Between 1936 and 1938 he taught classes at the Brooklyn Institute of Arts and Sciences and subsequently served as a guard for a year or two at the Museum of Non-Objective Painting. Throughout his career he was thought to have relied on the women in his life for economic as well as emotional support—first his mother, then Louise Nevelson, with whom he had a passionate relationship between 1942 and 1948, then, briefly, her sister, Anita, and finally, his wife, Margaret, after they met in 1949 and married in 1951.

Suffering from alcoholism and burdened with an erratic and often combative personality, he was said not to have a single close friend. According to Nevelson's biographer, "Rosenborg's gifts as a painter were undermined by his alcoholism, irascible temper, and adolescent-like quest for independence..." Another writer said he had an "exasperating character" and was "a legend in the art world for his suspicion of anything smacking of entanglement in social or professional relationships."

After he was afflicted with a stroke in 1991, Rosenborg and his wife moved to her home town of Portland, Oregon, and there he died in a nursing home on October 22, 1992.
