= Ben-Zion (artist) =

Russian-born American artist (1897–1987)

- בןציון
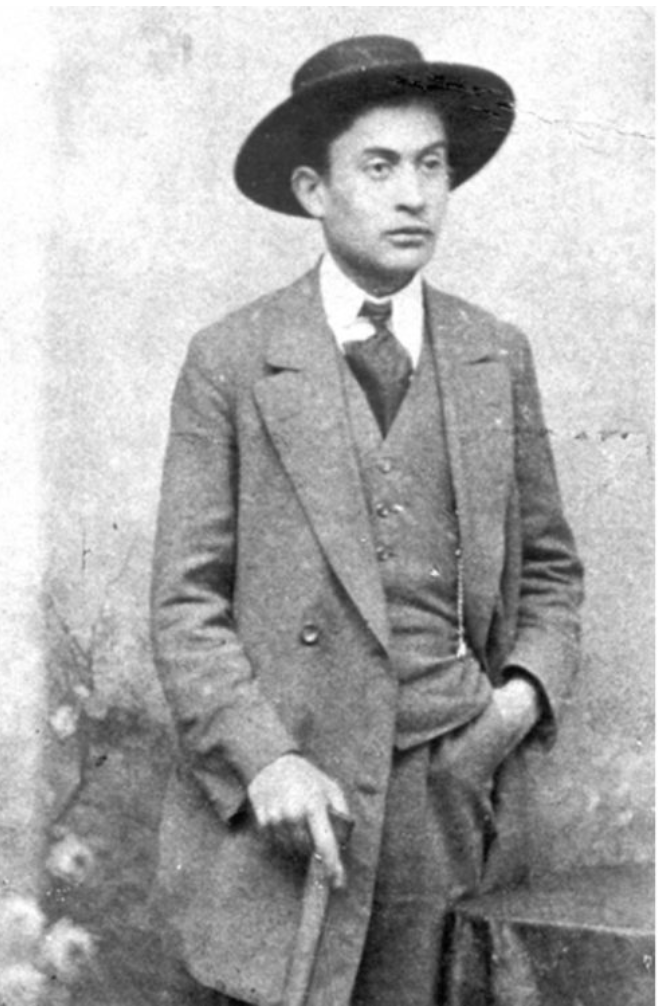
- Ben-Zion (1915)
- Born: July 8, 1897; Starokostiantyniv, Russian Empire
- Died: January 23, 1987 (aged 89); New York City, New York, U.S.
- Other names: Ben-Zion Weinman, Benzion Weinman, Ben-Tsiyon Ṿainman, Ben-Tsiyon, Bentsion Veinman
- Occupations: painter, printmaker, educator, sculptor, poet
- Years active: 1914–1970s
- Movement: Expressionism
- Spouse: Lillian Dubin (m. 1949–1987; death)

Ben-Zion, also known as Ben-Zion Weinman (July 8, 1897 – January 23, 1987) was a Russian-born American painter, printmaker, sculptor, educator, and poet. He was a member of "The Ten" group of expressionist artists.

== Early life ==
Ben-Zion was born on July 8, 1897, in Starokostiantyniv, Russian Empire (present-day is Ukraine). His father, Hirsch Weinman was a Jewish cantor, and initially he wanted to enter the rabbinate. In 1909, the family moved to Galicia. At age 17, he travelled to Vienna to study art. He had been rejected from entering the Academy of Fine Arts Vienna due to antisemitism. Early in his career, he wrote fairy tales and poems in Hebrew under the name "Benzion Weinman".

== Career ==
He immigrated to the United States in 1920 after the death of his father, and started by teaching Hebrew language. When he started painting he dropped his last name and started hyphenating. His first large scale painting was Friday Evening (1933), depicting his family's Sabbath dinner table. Starting in 1935, many of his paintings were expressionist versions of reinterpreted biblical scenes. His first solo exhibition was in 1936 at the Artists' Gallery in New York City. His early artwork was primarily done in oil paint, watercolors, and intaglio printmaking. He was largely a self-taught artist.

From 1936 until 1942, he was a founding member of "The Ten" expressionist artist group, which also included the artists Mark Rothko, Louis Harris (artist), Adolph Gottlieb, Ralph Rosenborg, Louis Schanker, Joseph Solman, Nahum Tschacbasov, and Ilya Bolotowsky. The mission of the art group was, "to protest against the reputed equivalence of American painting and literal painting."

From the 1930s to the 1960s, Ben-Zion taught art (through the Works Progress Administration) at Cooper Union and other locations.

In the 1950s, he began working in welded iron sculptures. In 1959, the Jewish Museum in New York City held a retrospective exhibition of his work.

== Death and legacy ==
Ben-Zion died on January 23, 1987, in New York City. He was survived by his wife Lillian (née Dubin).

Ben-Zion's works are in the Smithsonian American Art Museum, the Metropolitan Museum of Art, the Museum of Modern Art, the Israeli National Maritime Museum, the Art Institute of Chicago, the Brooklyn Museum,the Nelson-Atkins Museum of Art, the National Gallery of Art, the Whitney Museum of American Art, The Phillips Collection, the Hirshhorn Museum and Sculpture Garden, and the Print Collection at the New York Public Library.

== Publications ==
- Jick, Millicent. (1986). Ben-Zion: A Tradition of Independence. Berkeley, Calif. : Judah L. Magnes Museum.
- Soltes, Ori Z., ed. (1997), Ben-Zion: In Search of Oneself, B'nai B'rith Klutznick National Jewish Museum
- Weinman, Ben-Zion (1985). Dubin, Lillian; Shalem, Tabita (eds.). Ben-Zion Iron Sculpture. Alpine Fine Arts Collection. ISBN 978-0881681246.
- Weinman, Ben-Zion (1950). Biblical Themes (etching/print portfolio). Roger Lacourière (printmaker). New York City, New York: Curt Valentin Gallery.
- Weinman, Ben-Zion. (1959). Ben-Zion, 1933-1959: A Retrospect. Commentary by Stephen S. Kayser. New York City, New York: The Jewish Museum.
