= Louis Schanker =

American abstract artist (1903–1981)

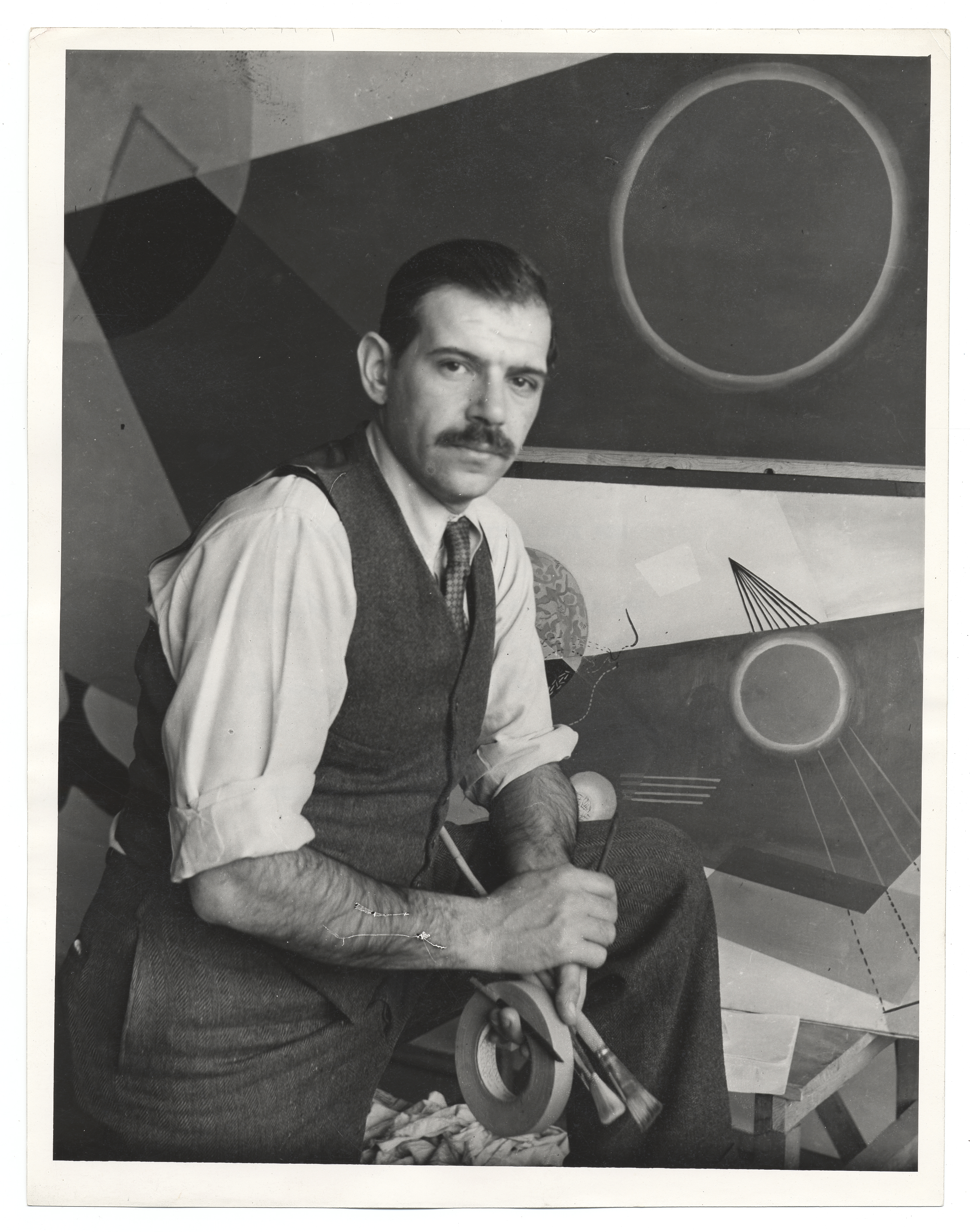
- Schanker in 1939
- Born: 1903; New York City, U.S.
- Died: May 7, 1981 (aged 78); New York City, U.S.
- Education: Académie de la Grande Chaumière
- Movement: Abstract art
- Spouse: Libby Holman (m. 1960; died 1971)

Louis Schanker (1903 – May 7, 1981) was an American abstract artist.

== Early life ==
He grew up in an Orthodox Jewish environment in the Bronx, New York. His parents, Sam, a tailor, and Fannie Schanker, were of Romanian descent. He had five siblings. At an early age he had an interest in both art and music. He took art courses at Cooper Union, The Educational Alliance and The Art Students League with Barnett Newman, Mark Rothko and Milton Avery amongst others. During this time he shared a coldwater studio with the Soyer brothers, Chaim Gross and Adolph Gottlieb. In 1920, he traveled across the country. He lived the hobo life, joined the Sparks and then Barnum and Bailey circuses, later working as a thresher in the wheat fields of the Great Plains. There are elements in his works such as the circus murals done for the Neponsit Beach Children's Hospital and the print "Man Cutting Wheat" that reflect these experiences. Around 1924 he returned to New York, leased another studio and resumed his friendships and artwork. Schanker spent 1931 and 1932 attending classes at the Académie de la Grande Chaumière, painting and traveling in Paris, Italy and Spain and returned as something of a Cubist. He had his first show in 1933 at the Contemporary Arts Gallery and first exhibited at the Whitney Museum in 1936.

== Career ==
The Federal Government sponsored programs to assist people during the 1930s depression when there were no jobs available. Artists were included in the Public Works of Art Project and then the WPA Federal Art Project. Schanker participated in both beginning in 1933. He was an artist and supervisor in the mural and graphic arts departments. In the New York City Division he worked with many other artists including Jackson Pollock, Lee Krasner, Burgoyne Diller, Byron Browne, Milton Avery, and Stuart Davis. These were controversial times in the arts community. In 1935 he and others (Ilya Bolotowsky, Ben-Zion, Marcus Rothkowitz (aka, Mark Rothko), Adolph Gottlieb, Joseph Solman, Tschacbasov, Louis Harris, and Ralph Rosenborg) formed a group called The Ten that protested the lack of support for American Abstract Artists by the Whitney Museum which concentrated on representational art. Schanker and Bolotowsky were also in the awkward position of having their works being shown in the museum's 1936 Annual exhibit at the same time that they were protesting. Another group, founded in 1937, of which he was a founding member, the American Abstract Artists, (AAA) arose to promote and foster public understanding of abstract art.

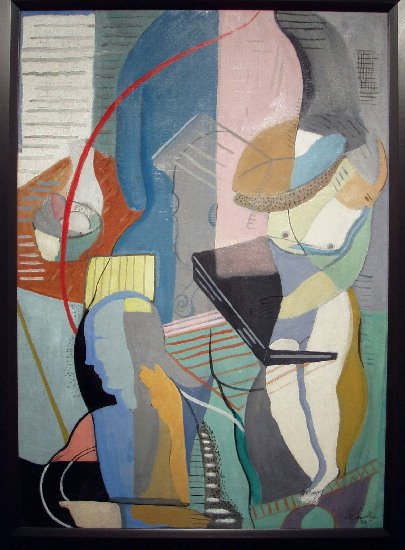
Schanker's "Abstraction with Musical Instruments"

Schanker was a radical among radicals. His "conglomerations of color-patches, among other things", wrote the sympathetic art critic Emily Genauer in 1935, "are bound to alienate no small part of the gallery-going public." However, the work proved popular in the New York art scene.

By 1937, even the often hostile New York Times art critic Edward Alden Jewell softened to the artist. When speaking of Schanker's major WPA mural at the municipal building studios of WNYC in New York, Jewell noted that Schanker had "a touch of lyric feeling". In 1938, Art News declared that "Louis Schanker's delightful Street Scene From My Window calls forth admiration for its delicacy of color and kaleidoscopic forms in plane geometry."

A decade later Schanker wrote:

Though much of my work is generally classified as abstract, all of my work develops from natural forms. I have great respect for the forms of nature and an inherent need to express myself in relation to those forms.

Schanker moved into teaching, first at the New School for Social Research and then, from 1949 until his retirement, at Bard College. The January 1955 Life Magazine article "Comeback of an Art", describes him as "one of the earliest U.S.woodcut artists to do abstractions, Schanker since has trained or influenced a generation of talented younger artists."

He was one of the major printmakers of the 1930s. He continued to be an active part of the New York art scene with many group and solo exhibitions including two shows (1943 and 1974,) at the Brooklyn Museum and a 1978 retrospective at the Associated American Artists. Just a few blocks from the hospital where he died in 1981 the Martin Diamond Gallery was holding a major show of his oils, sculpture and prints and his work was on exhibit at the Whitney Museum of American Art.

By all accounts a delightful man, Schanker was suspect to some because of his joie de vivre. According to Mercury Gallery owner, Sidney Schectman, who was showing the works of the Ten from 1937–39, Rothko was by all reports a very serious person. He did not have many friends. "I know he liked Schanker. I once talked to him about him, but he told me that Schanker was a playboy of some sort even then, but a great painter and a great wood block [painter] ... you know, painted, the greatest. "But I don't know where he's going to go," he would say because he thought he was frivolous. And that's the kind of person Rothko was, terribly, terribly serious."

Schanker's has remained popular and there is still continuing interest in his works. In 1989, summing up Schanker's career for a book on American abstraction, Virginia Mecklenburg wrote of "an animated expressionism that aims at a fundamental emotional structure".

== Personal life ==
In December 1960, Schanker married socialite Libby Holman. It was his second marriage. They remained together until her death in 1971.

== Death ==
Schanker died on May 7, 1981, at the Lenox Hill Hospital, after previously suffering a stroke. He was 78 years old.

== Public collections ==
- The Art Institute of Chicago, Chicago, Illinois
- The Boston Public Library, Boston, Massachusetts
- The Brooklyn Museum of Art, Brooklyn, New York
- Carnegie Museums of Pittsburgh/Carnegie Institute, Pittsburgh, Pennsylvania
- Cincinnati Art Museum, Cincinnati, Ohio
- The Cleveland Museum of Art, Cleveland, Ohio
- CU Art Museum, University of Colorado at Boulder
- The Detroit Institute of Arts, Detroit, Michigan
- The Metropolitan Museum of Art, New York, New York
- University of Michigan Museum of Art, Ann Arbor, Michigan
- Museum of Modern Art, New York, New York
- Neuberger Museum of Art, SUNY, Purchase College, Purchase, New York
- The Newark Museum, Newark, New Jersey
- New York Public Library, New York, New York
- Philadelphia Museum of Art, Philadelphia, Pennsylvania
- The Phillips Collection, Washington, D.C.
- Sheldon Memorial Art Gallery, Lincoln, Nebraska
