= No. 6 (Violet, Green and Red) =

1951 painting by Mark Rothko

- Artist: Mark Rothko
- Year: 1951
- Medium: Oil on canvas
- Dimensions: 238.8 x 145.1 cm
- Location: Private collection

No. 6 (Violet, Green and Red) is a painting by the Latvian-American expressionist artist Mark Rothko created in 1951. In common with Rothko's other works from this period, No. 6 consists of large expanses of colour delineated by uneven, hazy shades. In 2014, it became one of the most expensive paintings sold at auction.

== 2014 sale ==
No. 6 (Violet, Green and Red) is one of the works implicated in the infamous Bouvier Affair. It was privately bought for €140 million by Dmitry Rybolovlev in 2014. Rybolovlev is thought to have bought the painting via the Swiss dealer Bouvier. Rybolovlev learnt that Bouvier had actually bought the painting (rather than simply acting as a dealer) from Paiker H.B. for ~€80,000,000 before selling it on to Rybolovlev for €140,000,000.

== 2024 sale ==
In 2024, Citadel LLC billionaire Kenneth C. Griffin purchased the painting for $195m through a Christie's private auction.

== Sources ==
- Baal-Teshuva, Jacob. Rothko. Berlin: Taschen, 2003. ISBN 3-8228-1820-8
- Mark Rothko; David Anfam (1998). Mark Rothko: The Works on Canvas : Catalogue Raisonné. Yale University Press. p. 344. ISBN 978-0-300-07489-5.
