= Jacob Baal-Teshuva =

Israeli-American author and art critic (1929–2022)

- יעקב בעל תשובה
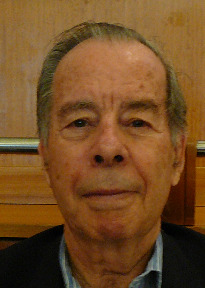
- Born: 1929; Jerusalem, British Mandate Palestine
- Died: March 3, 2022 (aged 92–93); Florida, U.S.
- Education: Hebrew University of Jerusalem, New York University
- Occupation(s): Author, journalist, art critic, and art collector
- Years active: 1954–2022
- Known for: Being an author of art monographs on modern and contemporary artists
- Notable work: Chagall: A Retrospective (1995)
- Spouse: Aviva Baal-Teshuva (m. 1967; death 2016)

Jacob Baal-Teshuva (1929–2022) was an Israeli-American author, journalist, art critic, and art collector.

His writings, exhibitions, and art collections included artists such as Christo and Jeanne-Claude, Mark Rothko, Yves Klein, Joan Mitchell, Jean-Michel Basquiat, Louis Comfort Tiffany, and Andy Warhol. He was considered an internationally recognized expert on Marc Chagall.

== Background ==
Baal-Teshuva was born in Jerusalem in 1929. He studied at the Hebrew University of Jerusalem and New York University. He was married to artist Aviva Baal-Teshuva (Hebrew: אביבה בעל תשובה), born Heilvig Hilde Schmidt in Berlin in 1940, until her death in 2016. Over the next 50 years, they collected 20th-century artworks, most of which were sold in a Sotheby's online auction titled "An Artistic Home."

Baal-Teshuva resided and worked in New York and Paris. He died in Florida on March 3, 2022.

== Published books ==
- Baal-Teshuva, Jacob (1963). The Mission of Israel. Robert Speller & Sons. ISBN 9780831500000.
- Baal-Teshuva, Jacob (1964). Art Treasures of the United Nations. Thomas Yoseloff. ISBN 9780805200000.
- Baal-Teshuva, Jacob (1964). Toward World Peace: Addresses and Public Statements 1957–1963 by U Thant. Thomas Yoseloff. ISBN 9780805200017.
- Baal-Teshuva, Jacob (1993). Andy Warhol: 1928–1987: Works from the Collection of Jose Mugrabi and an Isle of Man Company. Prestel. ISBN 9783791312774.
- Baal-Teshuva, Jacob (1993). Christo: The Reichstag and Urban Projects. Prestel. ISBN 9783791313238.
- Baal-Teshuva, Jacob; Chagall, Marc (1995). Chagall: A Retrospective. Hugh Lauter Levin Associates. ISBN 9780883634950.
- Baal-Teshuva, Jacob; Christo; Jeanne-Claude; Volz, Wolfgang (1995). Christo & Jeanne-Claude. Taschen. ISBN 9783822885642.
- Baal-Teshuva, Jacob; Christo; Jeanne-Claude; Volz, Wolfgang (1995). Running Fence: Sonoma and Marin Counties, California 1972–76. Taschen. ISBN 9783822885659.
- Baal-Teshuva, Jacob (1998). Calder: 1898–1976. Taschen. ISBN 9783822882702.
- Baal-Teshuva, Jacob (1998). Marc Chagall: 1887–1985. Taschen. ISBN 9783822882719.
- Baal-Teshuva, Jacob (2001). Louis Comfort Tiffany. Taschen. ISBN 9783836503136.
- Baal-Teshuva, Jacob; Clemente, Francesco; Basquiat, Jean-Michel (2001). Jean Michel Basquiat: Gemälde Und Arbeiten Auf Papier = Paintings and Works on Paper. Swiridoff. ISBN 9783934350564.
- Baal-Teshuva, Jacob; Restany, Pierre (2003). Faces of the Art World: Photography of Jacob Baal-Teshuva. National Center of Photography of Russian Federation.
- Kadishman, Menashe; Baal-Teshuva, Jacob (2007). Menashe Kadishman. Prestel Verlag. ISBN 9783791338149.
- Baal-Teshuva, Jacob (2009). Mark Rothko: 1903–1970: Pictures as Drama. Taschen. ISBN 9783836512831.
