= Elisabeth Luther Cary =

American writer and art critic

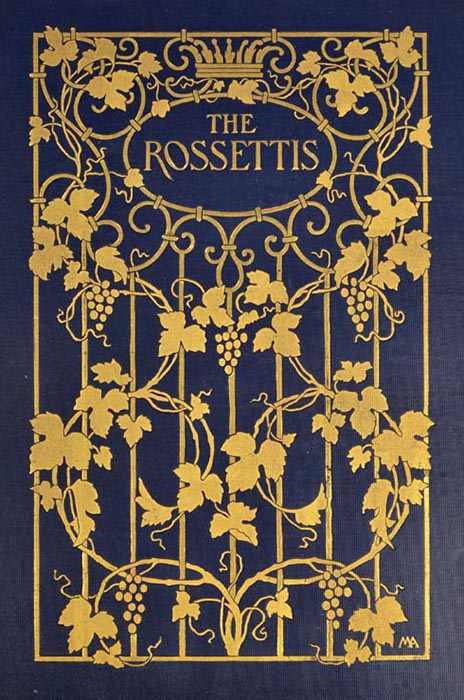
- The Rossettis by Elisabeth Luther Cary
- Born: May 18, 1867; Brooklyn, New York
- Died: July 13, 1936 (aged 69); Brooklyn, New York
- Occupations: Writer and art critic

Elisabeth Luther Cary (May 18, 1867 – July 13, 1936) was an American writer and art critic.

== Early life ==
Born in Brooklyn, New York, she was the daughter of Edward and Elisabeth (Luther) Cary. Her father was editor of the Brooklyn Union and later became an editorial writer for The New York Times. Elisabeth was privately educated and from 1885–1898 she studied art.

== Career ==
From 1893–1895, she translated three novels from French. In the years that followed she published a series of studies on prominent literary figures. In 1904, she collaborated with Annie M. Jones to produce a book of recipes inspired by quotes from famous literary figures titled, Books and My Food. She began publishing a monthly small art magazine called The Scrip in 1905.

In 1908, she was named the first full-time art critic for The New York Times, where she worked for the next twenty five years. Following World War I, she helped encourage the founding of industrial arts schools and the introduction of machinery into the studio.

== Death ==
After living in Brooklyn her entire life, she died of heat exhaustion in 1936. She was buried in Greenwood Cemetery, Brooklyn.

== Bibliography ==
- August Lepère (1914).
- Artists Past and Present - Random Studies (1909).
- Honoré Daumier, a collection of his social and political caricatures together with an introductory essay on his art (1907).
- The works of James McNeill Whistler: a study (1907).
- The art of William Blake: his sketch-book, his water-colours, his painted books (1907).
- The novels of Henry James: a study (1905) with Frederick Allen King.
- Emerson, poet and thinker (1904).
- Books and my food: with literary quotations and original recipes for every day in the year (1904) with Annie M. Jones.
- William Morris: poet, craftsman, socialist (1902).
- The Rossettis: Dante Gabriel and Christina (1900).
- Browning, poet and man: a survey (1898).
- Tennyson: his homes, his friends, and his work (1898).

== Translations ==
- Vte. Eugène-Melchior Vogüé, Russian Portraits (1895).
- Pierre Maël, The Land of the Tawny Beasts (1895).
- Francisque Sarcey, Recollections of Middle Life (1893).
- Edouard Rod, Father and Son
