= Ilya Bolotowsky =

Russian-American painter (1907–1981)

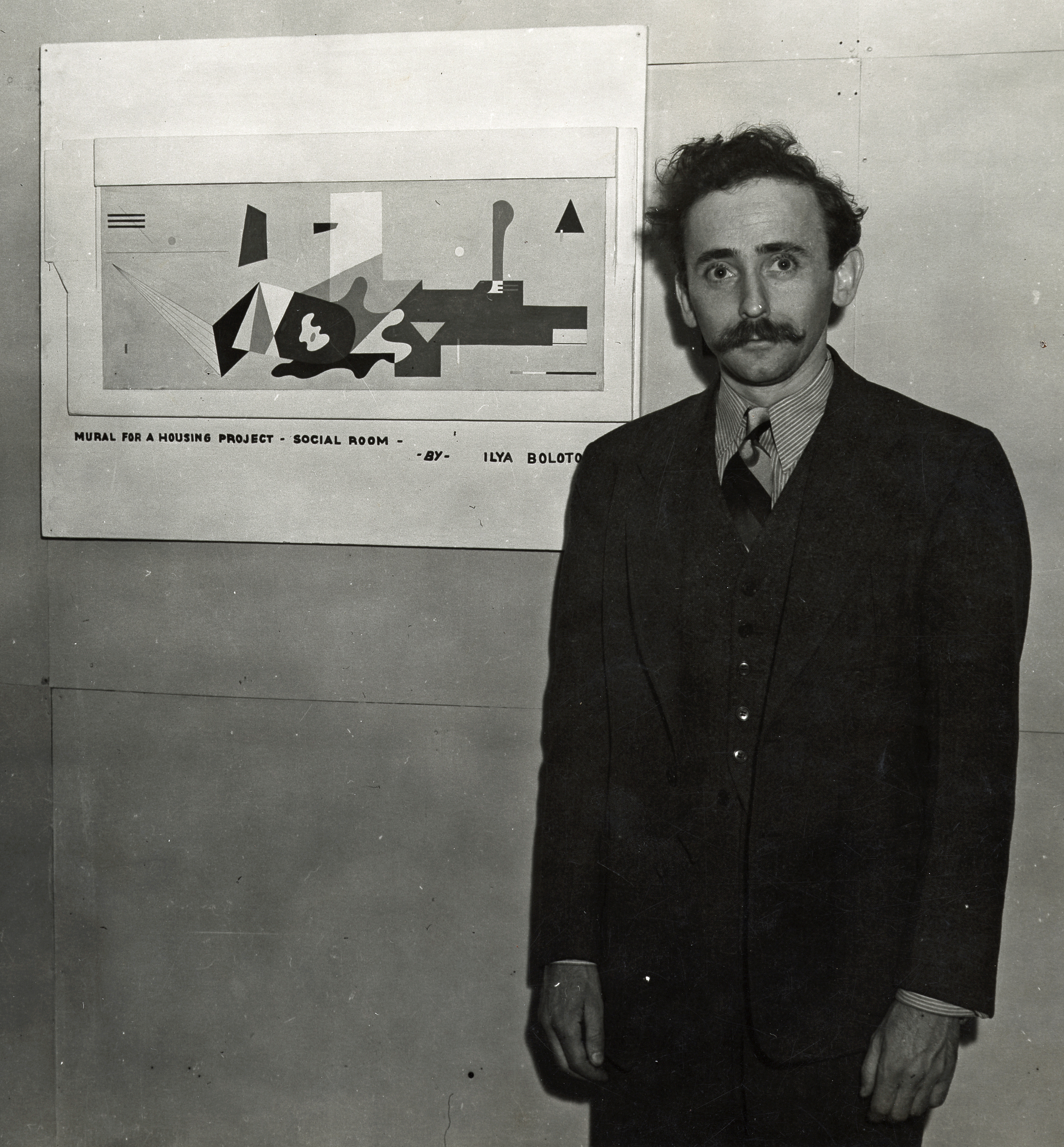
- Bolotowsky in 1938
- Born: July 1, 1907; St. Petersburg, Russia
- Died: November 22, 1981 (aged 74); New York City, U.S.
- Education: National Academy of Design
- Known for: Painting, murals, art education
- Movement: Abstract art, cubism, geometric abstraction, neoclassicism

Ilya Bolotowsky (July 1, 1907 – November 22, 1981) was an early 20th-century Russian-American painter in abstract styles in New York City. His work, a search for philosophical order through visual expression, embraced cubism and geometric abstraction and was influenced by Dutch painter Piet Mondrian.

== Biography ==
Born to Jewish parents in St. Petersburg, Russia, Bolotowsky lived in Baku and Constantinople before immigrating to the United States in 1923, where he settled in New York City. He attended the National Academy of Design. He became associated with a group called "The Ten Whitney Dissenters" or simply "The Ten", a group of artists including Louis Schanker, Adolph Gottlieb, Mark Rothko, Ben-Zion, and Joseph Solman who rebelled against the strictures of the Academy and held independent exhibitions.

Bolotowsky was strongly influenced by Dutch painter Piet Mondrian and the tenets of De Stijl, a movement that advocated the possibility of ideal order in the visual arts. Bolotowsky adopted Mondrian's use of horizontal and vertical geometric pattern and a palette restricted to primary colors and neutrals.

Having turned to geometric abstractions, in 1936 Bolotowsky co-founded American Abstract Artists, a cooperative formed to promote the interests of abstract painters and to increase understanding between themselves and the public.

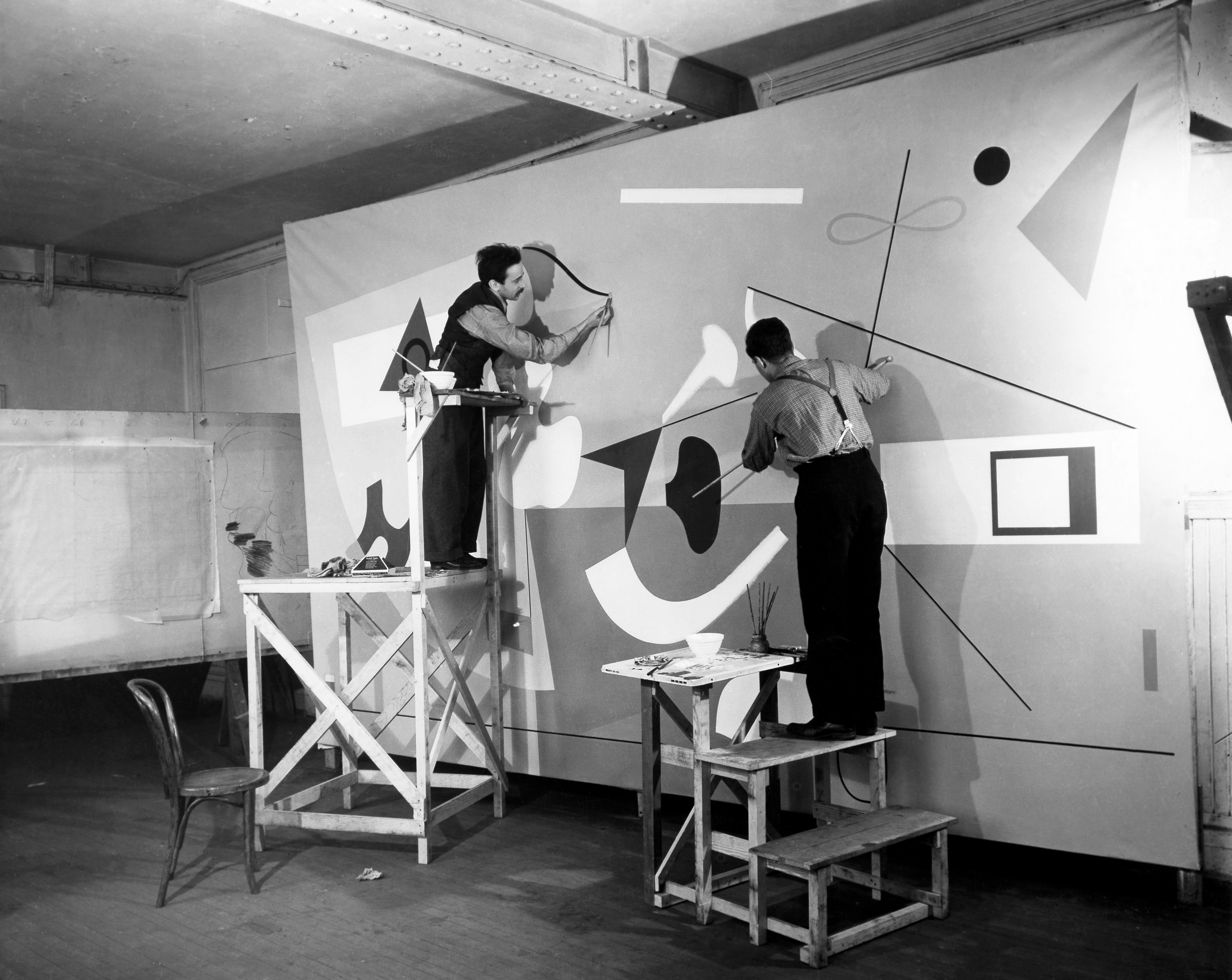
Ilya Bolotowsky (left)

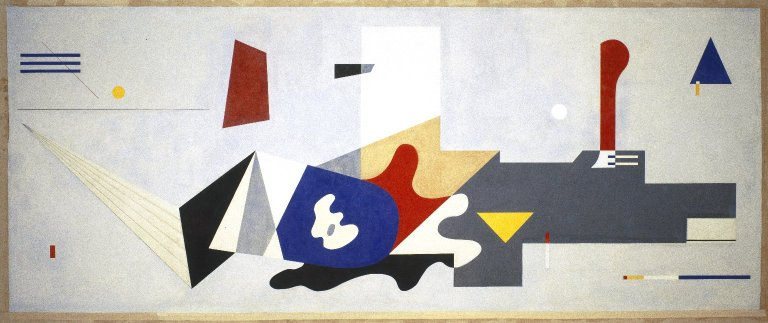
Bolotowsky mural for the Williamsburg Housing Project

Bolotowsky's 1936 mural for the Williamsburg Housing Project in Brooklyn was one of the first abstract murals done under the Federal Art Project.

In the 1960s, he began making three-dimensional forms, usually vertical and straight-sided. Bolotowsky's work was exhibited at the University of New Mexico in 1970.

Bolotowsky's first solo museum show was in 1974 at New York City's Guggenheim Museum and went on to the National Collection of Fine Arts.

His work has been exhibited at the Anita Shapolsky Gallery in New York City.

A Bolotowsky painting bought at a North Carolina Goodwill store for $9.99 was auctioned at Sotheby's in September 2012 for $34,375.

== Teaching ==
Bolotowsky taught at Black Mountain College from 1946 to 1948. The artists Kenneth Noland and Ruth Asawa were among his students. He taught humanities and fine arts at the University of Wyoming, Brooklyn College, Hunter College, the Southampton, New York campus of Long Island University, the State University of New York at New Paltz, the University of Wisconsin, Whitewater, and the University of New Mexico.

== Collections ==
- The Governor Nelson A. Rockefeller Empire State Plaza Art Collection
- Metropolitan Museum of Art
- Museum of Modern Art
- The Phillips Collection
- Smithsonian American Art Museum
- Speed Art Museum
- Black Mountain College Museum + Arts Center
- The Hyde Collection
