= Nahum Tschacbasov =

Russian-American Jewish expressionist artist (1899–1984)

- Наум Чакбасов
- Born: Nahum Stefanovich Lichter; August 31, 1899; Baku, Russian Empire
- Died: February 1, 1984 (aged 84); New York City, New York, U.S.
- Burial place: New Montefiore Cemetery
- Other names: Nathan Richter, H. H. Richter, Hanathan Richter, Nathan Lichterman, Chuck Tschacbasov, Nate Tschacbasov, Nahum Tschakbassoff, Nahum Lichter
- Occupations: Visual artist, poet, graphic artist, businessperson, teacher
- Known for: Paintings, prints, teaching
- Movement: Expressionism, social realism, surrealist
- Spouses: Esther Sorokin, Irene Zevon

Nahum Tschacbasov (1899–1984; Russian: Наум Степанович Чакбасов, Georgian: ნაუმ ჩაჩბასოვი) also known as Nahum Lichter, and Nahum Tschakbassoff, was a Russian-born American painter, printmaker, graphic artist, poet, businessperson, and educator. He used many names including Nahum Lichter, Nathan Richter, H. H. Richter, Hanathan Richter, and Nathan Lichterman. Tschacbasov was a member of "The Ten", a group of expressionist artists.

== Early life ==
He was born on August 31, 1899, in Baku, Russian Empire, into a Georgian Jewish family. In 1905, when he was a young child, his family moved to Chicago because of pogroms. There are varying stories as to why he used different names either due to a forged passport used for immigration; to avoid paying child support; and/or because he was a con-man. He served in the United States Navy from 1917 to 1919.

== Career ==
In the 1920s and 1930s, he worked as a businessman in Chicago where he made a fortune. His second marriage was to his secretary Esther. Tschacbasov moved to France in 1932 to 1933, where he studied painting with Adolph Gottlieb, Marcel Gromaire, and Fernand Léger.

When the family returned to the United States the Tschacbasov family moved to Brooklyn. Early in his career he had a good relationship with artists Milton Avery, Raphael Soyer, Moses Soyer, Isaac Soyer, William Gropper, David Burliuk, and Philip Evergood. In 1935, he was part of a group exhibition at the Gallery Secession alongside Mark Rothko, Gottlieb, and the other artist members of "The Ten".

He taught at the Art Students League of New York. Additionally he taught painting at his own art school in Woodstock, New York, and taught at the Marxist-focused John Reed Club School. His notable art students include Fritzie Abadi, James F. Walker, and his future wife Irene Zevon.

In 1982, Southampton College Press published his illustrated poetry book, Machinery of Fright.

== Death and legacy ==
He died in February 1984 at New York University Hospital. He is buried in New Montefiore Cemetery.

It was estimated he had made some 7,000+ paintings and prints. His work is included in museum collections including the Smithsonian American Art Museum, the Metropolitan Museum of Art, the Brooklyn Museum, the Jewish Museum, and the Whitney Museum of American Art.

In 2013, he had a posthumous solo exhibition curated by Marina Kovalyov at the National Arts Club, as part of the 11th Annual Russian Heritage Month.

== Personal life ==
Tschacbasov was a member of the Communist Party.

His second wife was Esther Sorokin, who died in 1961; his third wife was painter and his former student, Irene Zevon. He had two children. His daughter was Alexandra (or Sasha, Sondra), she was the second wife of writer Saul Bellow; together they had son Adam Bellow. Bellows book Herzog (1964) was influenced by his divorce from Alexandra. According to Alexandra in 2011, her father sexually abused her starting around age 11.

== Publications ==
- Tschacbasov, Nahum (1982). The Machinery of Fright. Southampton College Press. ISBN 978-0-943052-00-7.
