= Joseph Solman =

Belarusian-born American expressionist painter

Joseph Solman (January 25, 1909 – April 16, 2008) was an American painter and founder of The Ten, a group of New York City Expressionist painters in the 1930s. His best known works include his "Subway Gouaches" depicting travelers on the New York City Subway.

== Career ==
Born in Vitebsk, Russian Empire, he was brought to America from the Russian Empire as a child in 1912, Solman was a prodigious draftsman and knew, in his earliest teens, that he would be an artist. He went straight from high school to the National Academy of Design, though he says he learned more by sketching in the subway on the way back from school late at night: people "pose perfectly when they're asleep." In 1929, Solman saw the inaugural show at the Museum of Modern Art featuring Seurat, Gauguin, Van Gogh, and Cézanne.

In 1934, Solman had his first one-man show, much influenced by the French modern artist Georges Rouault. One critic was impressed by "the mystery that lurks in deserted streets in the late twilight." Another noted that Solman's color had "an astonishingly rich quality that burns outward beneath the surface."

Joseph Solman was, with Mark Rothko, the unofficial co-leader of The Ten, a group of expressionist painters including Louis Schanker, Adolph Gottlieb and Ilya Bolotowsky, who exhibited as the "Whitney Dissenters" at the Mercury Galleries in New York City in 1938. A champion of modernism, Solman was elected an editor of Art Front Magazine when its other editors, art historian Meyer Schapiro and critic Harold Rosenberg, were still partial to Social Realism. But Solman never believed in abstraction for abstraction's sake. "I have long discovered for myself," Solman has said, "that what we call the subject yields more pattern, more poetry, more drama, greater abstract design and tension than any shapes we may invent." In writing about a purchase of a typical 1930s Solman street scene for the Wichita Museum, director Howard Wooden put it this way: "Solman has produced the equivalent of an abstract expressionist painting a full decade before the abstract expressionist movement came to dominate the American art scene, but without abandoning identifiable forms."

In 1964, The Times, discussing his well-known subway gouaches (done while commuting to his some-time job as a racetrack pari-mutuel clerk), called him a "Pari-Mutuel Picasso." In 1985, on the occasion of a 50-year retrospective, The Washington Post wrote: "It appears to have dawned, at last, on many collectors that this is art that has already stood the acid test of time." is

Joseph Solman died in his sleep, at his long-time home in New York City, on April 16, 2008. He was the father of economist and television commentator Paul Solman and the retired elementary school teacher and community organizer, Ronni Solman.
