= Mark Rothko =

Abstract painter (1903–1970)

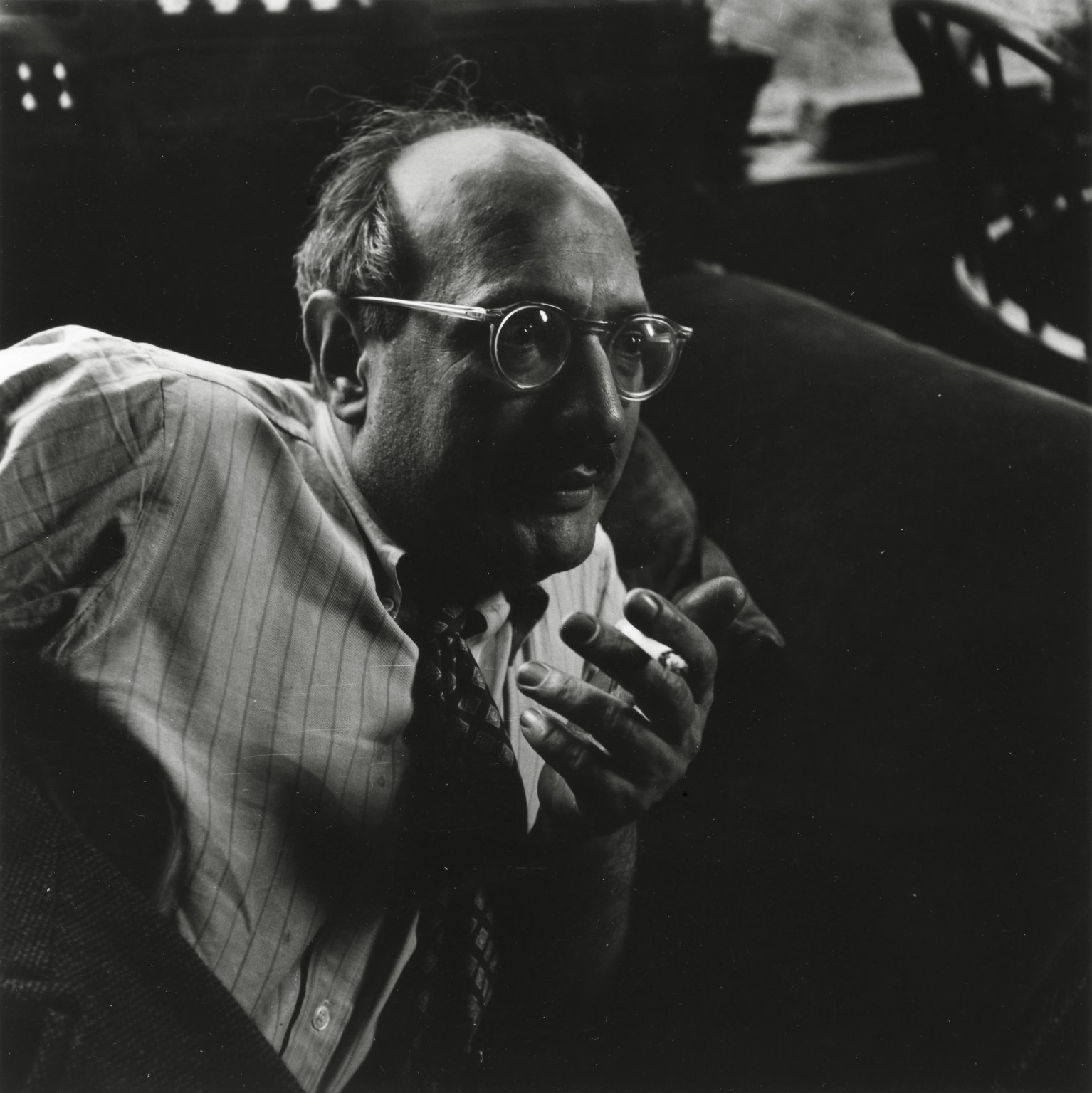
- Mark Rothko, Yorktown Heights, c. 1949. Brooklyn Museum, by Consuelo Kanaga.
- Born: Markus Yakovlevich Rothkowitz; September 25, 1903; Dvinsk, Russian Empire (now Daugavpils, Latvia)
- Died: February 25, 1970 (aged 66); New York City, U.S.
- Known for: Painting
- Movement: Abstract expressionism, color field, Minimalism
- Spouses: Edith Sachar (m. 1932; div. 1943); Mary Alice "Mell" Beistle (m. 1944)
- Children: 2
- Patrons: Peggy Guggenheim, John de Menil, Dominique de Menil

Mark Rothko (/ˈrɒθkoʊ/ ROTH-koh; Markus Yakovlevich Rothkowitz until 1940; September 25, 1903 – February 25, 1970) was a Latvian-born American abstract painter. He is best known for his color field paintings that depicted irregular and painterly rectangular regions of color, which he produced from 1949 to 1970. Although Rothko did not personally subscribe to any one school, he is associated with the American abstract expressionism movement of modern art.

Born to a Jewish family in Daugavpils, Latvia, then part of the Russian Empire, Rothko emigrated with his parents and siblings to the United States, arriving at Ellis Island in late 1913 and originally settling in Portland, Oregon. He moved to New York City in 1923 where his youthful period of artistic production dealt primarily with urban scenery. In response to World War II, Rothko's art entered a transitional phase during the 1940s, where he experimented with mythological themes and Surrealism to express tragedy. Toward the end of the decade, Rothko painted canvases with regions of pure color which he further abstracted into rectangular color forms, the idiom he would use for the rest of his life.

In his later career, Rothko executed several canvases for three different mural projects. The Seagram murals were to have decorated the Four Seasons Restaurant in the Seagram Building, but Rothko eventually grew disgusted with the idea that his paintings would be decorative objects for wealthy diners and refunded the lucrative commission, donating the paintings to museums, including the Tate Gallery. The Harvard Mural series was donated to a dining room in Harvard's Holyoke Center; their colors faded badly over time due to Rothko's use of the pigment lithol red together with regular sunlight exposure. The Harvard series has since been restored using a special lighting technique. Rothko contributed 14 canvases to a permanent installation at the Rothko Chapel, a non-denominational chapel in Houston, Texas.

Although Rothko lived modestly for much of his life, the resale value of his paintings grew tremendously in the decades following his suicide in 1970. His painting No. 6 (Violet, Green and Red) sold in 2014 for $186 million.

== Childhood ==
Rothko was born in 1903 in Dvinsk (now Daugavpils, Latvia), a town within the Pale of Settlement in the Russian Empire. His father, Jacob (Yakov) Rothkowitz, was a pharmacist and intellectual who initially provided his children with a secular and political, rather than religious, upbringing. According to Rothko, his Marxist father was "violently anti-religious". In an environment where Jews were often blamed for many of the ills that befell Russia, Rothko's early childhood was plagued by fear.

Despite Jacob Rothkowitz's modest income, the family was highly educated ("We were a reading family", Rothko's sister recalled), and Rothko spoke Lithuanian Yiddish (Litvish), Hebrew and Russian. Following his father's return to the Orthodox Judaism of his own youth, Rothko, the youngest of four siblings, was sent to the cheder at age five, where he studied the Talmud, although his elder siblings had been educated in the public school system.

== Migration from Russian Empire to the U.S. ==
Fearing that his elder sons were about to be drafted into the Imperial Russian Army, Jacob Rothkowitz emigrated from the Russian Empire to the United States. Mark, then known as Markus, remained in the Russian Empire with his mother and elder sister Sonia. They arrived as immigrants, at Ellis Island, in late 1913. From there, they crossed the country, to join Jacob and the elder brothers, in Portland, Oregon. Jacob's death, a few months later, of colon cancer, left the family without financial support. Sonia operated a cash register, while Markus worked in one of his uncle's warehouses, selling newspapers to employees. His father's death also led Rothko to sever his ties with religion. After he had mourned his father's death for almost a year at a local synagogue, he vowed never to set foot in one again.

Rothko started school in the United States in 1913, quickly accelerating from third to fifth grade. In June 1921, he completed the secondary level, with honors, at Lincoln High School in Portland, Oregon, at age 17. He learned his fourth language, English, and became an active member of the Jewish community center, where he proved adept at political discussions. Like his father, Rothko was passionate about issues such as workers' rights and contraception. At the time, Portland was a center of revolutionary activity in the U.S. and the region where the revolutionary syndicalist union Industrial Workers of the World (IWW) was active.

Having grown up around radical workers' meetings, Rothko attended meetings of the IWW, including such speakers as the radical socialist Bill Haywood and the anarchist Emma Goldman, where he developed strong oratorical skills he later used in defense of Surrealism. With the onset of the Russian Revolution, Rothko organized debates about it. Despite the repressive political atmosphere, he wished to become a labor union organizer.

Rothko received a scholarship to Yale. At the end of his first year in 1922, the scholarship was not renewed, and he worked as a waiter and delivery boy to support his studies. Rothko was more an autodidact than a diligent pupil:

One of his fellow students remembers that he hardly seemed to study, but that he was a voracious reader.

Rothko and a friend, Aaron Director, started a satirical magazine, The Yale Saturday Evening Pest, that lampooned the school's stuffy, bourgeois tone. Finding Yale to be elitist, and racist, at the end of his sophomore year, Rothko dropped out, never returning until he was awarded an honorary degree 46 years later.

== Early career ==
In the autumn of 1923, Rothko found work in New York's garment district. While visiting a friend at the Art Students League of New York, he saw students sketching a model. According to Rothko, this was the beginning of his life as an artist. He later enrolled in the Parsons The New School for Design, where one of his instructors was Arshile Gorky. Rothko characterized Gorky's leadership of the class as "overcharged with supervision." That same autumn, he took courses at the Art Students League taught by Cubist artist Max Weber, who had been a part of the French avant-garde movement. To his students eager to know about Modernism, Weber was seen as "a living repository of modern art history". Under Weber's tutelage, Rothko began to view art as a vehicle for emotional and religious expression. Rothko's paintings from this era reveal the influence of his instructor. Years later, when Weber attended a show of his former student's work and expressed his admiration, Rothko was immensely pleased.

=== Circle of friends ===
Rothko's move to New York landed him in a fertile artistic atmosphere. Modernist painters regularly exhibited in New York galleries, and the city's museums were an invaluable resource for a budding artist's knowledge and skills. Among the important early influences on him were the works of the German Expressionists, the surrealist art of Paul Klee, and the paintings of Georges Rouault.

In 1928, with a group of other young artists, Rothko exhibited works at the Opportunity Gallery. His paintings, including dark, moody, expressionist interiors and urban scenes, were generally well accepted among critics and peers. To supplement his income, in 1929 Rothko began instructing schoolchildren in drawing, painting, and clay sculpture at the Center Academy of the Brooklyn Jewish Center, where he remained active for over twenty years.

During the early 1930s, Rothko met Adolph Gottlieb, who, along with Barnett Newman, Joseph Solman, Louis Schanker, and John Graham, was part of a group of young artists surrounding the painter Milton Avery. According to Elaine de Kooning, it was Avery who "gave Rothko the idea that [the life of a professional artist] was a possibility." Avery's abstract nature paintings, utilizing a rich knowledge of form and color, had a tremendous influence on him. Soon, Rothko's paintings took on the subject matter and color similar to Avery's, as seen in Bathers, or Beach Scene of 1933–1934.

Rothko, Gottlieb, Newman, Solman, Graham, and their mentor, Avery, spent considerable time together, vacationing at Lake George, New York, and Gloucester, Massachusetts. In the daytime, they painted, then discussed art in the evenings. During a 1932 visit to Lake George, Rothko met Edith Sachar, a jewelry designer, whom he married later that year. The following summer, his first one-person show was held at the Portland Art Museum, consisting mostly of drawings and aquarelles. For this exhibition, Rothko took the very unusual step of displaying works done by his pre-adolescent students from the Center Academy, alongside his own. His family was unable to understand Rothko's decision to be an artist, especially considering the dire economic situation of the Depression. Having suffered serious financial setbacks, the Rothkowitzes were mystified by Rothko's seeming indifference to financial necessity. They felt he was doing his mother a disservice by not finding a more lucrative and realistic career.

=== First solo show in New York ===
Returning to New York, Rothko had his first East Coast one-person show at the Contemporary Arts Gallery. He showed fifteen oil paintings, mostly portraits, along with some aquarelles and drawings. Among these works, the oil paintings especially captured the art critics' eyes. Rothko's use of rich fields of colors moved beyond Avery's influence. In late 1935, Rothko joined with Ilya Bolotowsky, Ben-Zion, Adolph Gottlieb, Louis Harris, Ralph Rosenborg, Louis Schanker and Joseph Solman to form "The Ten". According to a gallery show catalog, the mission of the group was "to protest against the reputed equivalence of American painting and literal painting."

Rothko was earning a growing reputation among his peers, particularly among the group that formed the Artists' Union. The Artists' Union, including Gottlieb and Solman, hoped to create a municipal art gallery, to show self-organized group exhibitions. In 1936, the group exhibited at the Galerie Bonaparte in France, which resulted in some positive critical attention. One reviewer remarked that Rothko's paintings "display authentic coloristic values." Later, in 1938, a show was held at the Mercury Gallery in New York, intended as a protest against the Whitney Museum of American Art, which the group regarded as having a provincial, regionalist agenda. Also during this period, Rothko, like Avery, Gorky, Pollock, de Kooning, and many others, found employment with the Works Progress Administration.

=== Development of style ===
Rothko's work has been described in eras. His early period (1924–1939) saw representational art inflected by impressionism, usually depicting urban scenes. In 1936, Rothko began writing a book, never completed, about similarities between the art of children and the work of modern painters. According to Rothko, the work of modernists, influenced by primitive art, could be compared to that of children in that "child art transforms itself into primitivism, which is only the child producing a mimicry of himself." In this manuscript, he observed: "Tradition of starting with drawing in academic notion. We may start with color." Rothko was using fields of color in his aquarelles and city scenes. His style was already evolving in the direction of his renowned later works. In the 1930s, Rothko and Gottlieb together worked through intellectual perceptions and opinions they had about contemporary art. By the 1940s, both artists were delving into mythology for themes and forms, tapping into what could be considered universal consciousness.

This period extended into his middle, "transitional" years (1940–1950), continuing incorporation of mythical and "biomorphic" abstraction, and "multiforms", the latter being canvases with large regions of color. Rothko's transitional decade was influenced by World War II, which prompted him to seek novel expression of tragedy in art. During this time Rothko was influenced by ancient Greek tragedians such as Aeschylus and his reading of Nietzsche's The Birth of Tragedy.

In Rothko's mature or "classic" period (1951–1970), he consistently painted rectangular regions of color, intended as "dramas" to elicit an emotional response from the viewer.

== Maturity ==
Rothko separated temporarily from his wife Edith in mid-1937. They reconciled several months later, but their relationship remained tense and they would divorce in 1944. On February 21, 1938, Rothko finally became a citizen of the United States. Concerned about antisemitism in America and Europe, Rothko abbreviated his name from "Markus Rothkowitz" to "Mark Rothko". The name "Roth", a common abbreviation, was still identifiably Jewish, so he settled upon "Rothko."

=== Inspiration from mythology ===
Fearing that modern American painting had reached a conceptual dead end, Rothko was intent on exploring subjects other than urban and nature scenes. He sought subjects that would complement his growing interest in form, space, and color. The world crisis of war gave this search a sense of immediacy. He insisted that the new subject matter have a social impact, yet be able to transcend the confines of current political symbols and values. In his essay "The Romantics Were Prompted," published in 1948, Rothko argued that the "archaic artist ... found it necessary to create a group of intermediaries, monsters, hybrids, gods and demigods," in much the same way that modern man found intermediaries in Fascism and the Communist Party. For Rothko, "without monsters and gods, art cannot enact a drama".

Rothko's use of mythology as a commentary on current history was not novel. Rothko, Gottlieb, and Newman read and discussed the works of Sigmund Freud and Carl Jung. In particular, they took interest in psychoanalytical theories concerning dreams, and archetypes of a collective unconscious. They understood mythological symbols as images, operating in a space of human consciousness, which transcends specific history and culture. Rothko later said that his artistic approach was "reformed" by his study of the "dramatic themes of myth". He allegedly stopped painting altogether in 1940, to immerse himself in reading Sir James Frazer's study of mythology The Golden Bough, and Freud's The Interpretation of Dreams.

=== Nietzsche's influence ===
Rothko's new vision attempted to address modern man's spiritual and creative mythological requirements. The most crucial philosophical influence on Rothko in this period was Friedrich Nietzsche's The Birth of Tragedy. Nietzsche claimed that Greek tragedy served to redeem man from the terrors of mortal life. The exploration of novel topics in modern art ceased to be Rothko's goal. From this time on, his art had the goal of relieving modern man's spiritual emptiness. He believed that this emptiness resulted partly from lack of mythology, which, according to Nietzsche, "The images of the myth have to be the unnoticed omnipresent demonic guardians, under whose care the young soul grows to maturity and whose signs help the man to interpret his life and struggles." Rothko believed his art could free unconscious energies, previously bound by mythological images, symbols, and rituals. He considered himself a "mythmaker", and proclaimed that "the exhilarated tragic experience is for me the only source of art".

Many of his paintings in this period contrast barbaric scenes of violence with civilized passivity, using imagery drawn primarily from Aeschylus's Oresteia trilogy. A list of Rothko's paintings from this period illustrates his use of myth: Antigone, Oedipus, The Sacrifice of Iphigenia, Leda, The Furies, Altar of Orpheus. Rothko evokes Judeo-Christian imagery in Gethsemane, The Last Supper, and Rites of Lilith. He also invokes Egyptian (Room in Karnak) and Syrian (The Syrian Bull) myths. Soon after World War II, Rothko believed his titles limited the larger, transcendent aims of his paintings. To allow maximum interpretation by the viewer, he stopped naming and framing his paintings, referring to them only by numbers.

=== "Mythomorphic" abstractionism ===
At the root of Rothko and Gottlieb's presentation of archaic forms and symbols, illuminating modern existence had been the influence of Surrealism, Cubism, and abstract art. In 1936, Rothko attended two exhibitions at the Museum of Modern Art, "Cubism and Abstract Art", and "Fantastic Art, Dada, and Surrealism".

In 1942, following the success of shows by Ernst, Miró, Wolfgang Paalen, Tanguy, and Salvador Dalí, artists who had immigrated to the United States because of the war, Surrealism took New York by storm. Rothko and his peers, Gottlieb and Newman, met and discussed the art and ideas of these European pioneers, as well as those of Mondrian.

New paintings were unveiled at a 1942 show at Macy's department store in New York City. In response to a negative review by The New York Times, Rothko and Gottlieb issued a manifesto, written mainly by Rothko. Addressing the Times critic's self-professed "befuddlement" over the new work, they stated "We favor the simple expression of the complex thought. We are for the large shape because it has the impact of the unequivocal. We wish to reassert the picture plane. We are for flat forms because they destroy illusion and reveal truth." On a more strident note, they criticized those who wanted to live surrounded by less challenging art, noting that their work necessarily "must insult anyone who is spiritually attuned to interior decoration".

Rothko viewed myth as a replenishing resource for an era of spiritual void. This belief had begun decades earlier, through his reading of Carl Jung, T. S. Eliot, James Joyce and Thomas Mann, among other authors.

=== Break with Surrealism ===
Baptismal Scene (1945) at the National Gallery of Art in 2023. This was Rothko's first painting to enter a museum collection, acquired by the Whitney Museum in 1946.

On June 13, 1943, Rothko and Sachar separated again. Rothko suffered depression following their divorce. Thinking that a change of scenery might help, Rothko returned to Portland. From there, he traveled to Berkeley, where he met artist Clyfford Still, and the two began a close friendship. Still's deeply abstract paintings would be of considerable influence on Rothko's later works. In the autumn of 1943, Rothko returned to New York. He met with noted collector and art dealer Peggy Guggenheim, but she was initially reluctant to take on his artworks. Rothko's one-person show at Guggenheim's the Art of This Century gallery, in late 1945, resulted in few sales, with prices ranging from $150 to $750. The exhibit also attracted less-than-favorable reviews from critics. During this period, Rothko had been stimulated by Still's abstract landscapes of color, and his style shifted away from surrealism. Rothko's experiments in interpreting the unconscious symbolism of everyday forms had run their course. His future lay with abstraction:

I insist upon the equal existence of the world engendered in the mind and the world engendered by God outside of it. If I have faltered in the use of familiar objects, it is because I refuse to mutilate their appearance for the sake of an action which they are too old to serve, or for which perhaps they had never been intended. I quarrel with surrealists and abstract art only as one quarrels with his father and mother; recognizing the inevitability and function of my roots, but insistent upon my dissent; I, being both they and an integral completely independent of them.

Rothko's masterpiece Slow Swirl at the Edge of the Sea (1945) illustrates his newfound propensity towards abstraction. It has been interpreted as a meditation on Rothko's courtship of his second wife, Mary Alice "Mell" Beistle, whom he met in 1944 and married in early 1945. Other readings have noted echoes of Botticelli's The Birth of Venus, which Rothko saw at an "Italian Masters" loan exhibition, at the Museum of Modern Art, in 1940. The painting presents, in subtle grays and browns, two human-like forms embraced in a swirling, floating atmosphere of shapes and colors. The rigid rectangular background foreshadows Rothko's later experiments in pure color. The painting was completed, not coincidentally, in the year the Second World War ended.

Sacrifice (1946) at the National Gallery of Art in 2023

Although initially hesitant to purchase his works, Guggenheim did acquire several works following Rothko's exhibition at the Art of This Century gallery, including Sacrifice (1946), which she purchased immediately following its completion. Like other works of this period, it depicted biomorphic shapes and abstract imagery in subtle tones. Guggenheim later showed this work in her European galleries, making it among the first of Rothko's paintings to be exhibited outside the United States.

Despite the abandonment of his "Mythomorphic Abstractionism", Rothko would still be recognized by the public primarily for his surrealist works, for the remainder of the 1940s. The Whitney Museum included them in their annual exhibit of contemporary art from 1943 to 1950. Baptismal Scene (1945), included in the shows at the Whitney, was acquired by the museum in 1946; this was the first work of Rothko's to enter a museum collection, marking a key career milestone. Baptismal Scene depicts an abstracted baptism in watercolors against a dusky grayish brown background, with an identifiable baptismal fountain at the top of the painting.

=== "Multiforms" ===
No. 9 (1948), an example of the artist's "multiform" paintings, at the National Gallery of Art in 2023

In 1946, Rothko created what art critics have since termed his transitional "multiform" paintings, although Rothko never used the term himself. Several of them, including No. 18 and Untitled (both 1948), are less transitional than fully realized. Rothko himself described these paintings as possessing a more organic structure, and as self-contained units of human expression. For him, these blurred blocks of various colors, devoid of landscape or the human figure, let alone myth and symbol, possessed their own life force. They contained a "breath of life" he found lacking in the most figurative painting of the era. They were filled with possibility, whereas his experimentation with mythological symbolism had become a tired formula. The "multiforms" brought Rothko to a realization of his signature style of rectangular regions of color, which he continued to produce for the rest of his life.

In the middle of this crucial period of transition, Rothko had been impressed by Clyfford Still's abstract fields of color, which were influenced in part by the landscapes of Still's native North Dakota. In 1947, during a summer semester teaching at the California School of Fine Art, Rothko and Still flirted with the idea of founding their own curriculum. In 1948, Rothko, Robert Motherwell, William Baziotes, Barnett Newman, and David Hare founded the Subjects of the Artist School at 35 East 8th Street. Well-attended lectures there were open to the public, with speakers such as Jean Arp, John Cage, and Ad Reinhardt, but the school failed financially and closed in the spring of 1949.

Although the group separated later in the same year, the school was the center of a flurry of activity in contemporary art. In addition to his teaching experience, Rothko began to contribute articles to two new art publications, Tiger's Eye and Possibilities. Using the forums as an opportunity to assess the current art scene, Rothko also discussed in detail his own work and philosophy of art. These articles reflect the elimination of figurative elements from his painting, and a specific interest in the new contingency debate launched by Wolfgang Paalen's Form and Sense publication of 1945.

Rothko described his new method as "unknown adventures in an unknown space", free from "direct association with any particular, and the passion of organism". Breslin described this change of attitude as "both self and painting are now fields of possibilities – an effect conveyed ... by the creation of protean, indeterminate shapes whose multiplicity is let be."

In 1947, he had a first solo exhibition at the Betty Parsons Gallery (March 3 to 22). In 1949, Rothko became fascinated by Henri Matisse's The Red Studio, acquired by the Museum of Modern Art that year. He later credited it as another key source of inspiration for his later abstract paintings.

== Late period ==
The discovery of his definitive form came at a period of great distress to the artist, as his mother Kate had died in October 1948. As the "multiforms" developed into what was to become his signature style, by early 1949 Rothko exhibited these new works at the Betty Parsons Gallery. For critic Harold Rosenberg, the paintings were nothing short of a revelation. After painting his first "multiform", Rothko had secluded himself in his home in East Hampton on Long Island. He invited only a select few, including Rosenberg, to view the new paintings.

Rothko happened upon the use of symmetrical rectangular blocks of two to three opposing or contrasting, yet complementary, colors, in which, for example, "the rectangles sometimes seem barely to coalesce out of the ground, concentrations of its substance. The green bar in Magenta, Black, Green on Orange, on the other hand, appears to vibrate against the orange around it, creating an optical flicker."

For the next seven years, Rothko painted in oil only for large canvases with vertical formats. Very large-scale designs were used in order to overwhelm the viewer, or, in Rothko's words, to make the viewer feel "enveloped within" the painting. For some critics, the large size was an attempt to make up for a lack of substance. In retaliation, Rothko stated:

I realize that historically the function of painting large pictures is painting something very grandiose and pompous. The reason I paint them, however ... is precisely because I want to be very intimate and human. To paint a small picture is to place yourself outside your experience, to look upon an experience as a stereopticon view or with a reducing glass. However you paint the larger picture, you are in it. It isn't something you command!

Rothko even went so far as to recommend that viewers position themselves as little as eighteen inches away from the canvas so that they might experience a sense of intimacy, as well as awe, a transcendence of the individual, and a sense of the unknown. As Rothko achieved success, he became increasingly protective of his works, turning down several potentially important sales and exhibition opportunities:

A picture lives by companionship, expanding and quickening in the eyes of the sensitive observer. It dies by the same token. It is therefore a risky and unfeeling act to send it out into the world. How often it must be permanently impaired by the eyes of the vulgar and the cruelty of the impotent who would extend the affliction universally!

To some critics and viewers, Rothko's aims exceeded his methods. Many of the abstract expressionists discussed their art as aiming toward a spiritual experience, or at least an experience that exceeded the boundaries of the purely aesthetic. In later years, Rothko emphasized more emphatically the spiritual aspect of his artwork, a sentiment that would culminate in the construction of the Rothko Chapel.

Many of his early signature paintings are composed of bright, vibrant colors, particularly reds and yellows, expressing energy and ecstasy. By the mid-1950s, however, Rothko began to employ dark blues and greens, which many critics suggested was representative of growing darkness within Rothko's personal life.

=== Technique ===
With an absence of figurative representation, what drama there is to be found in a late Rothko is in the contrast of colors, radiating against one another. His paintings can then be likened to a sort of fugue-like arrangement, with each variation counterpoised against one another, yet all existing within one architectonic structure.

To achieve this effect, Rothko applied a thin layer of a binder mixed with pigment directly onto uncoated and untreated canvas and painted significantly thinned oils directly onto this layer, creating a dense mixture of overlapping colors and shapes. One of his objectives was to make the various layers of the painting dry quickly, without mixing of colors, so that he could soon create new layers on top of the earlier ones. His brushstrokes were fast and light, a method he would continue to use until his death. His increasing adeptness at this method is apparent in the paintings completed for the chapel.

Rothko used several original techniques that he tried to keep secret even from his assistants. Electron microscopy and ultraviolet analysis conducted by the MOLAB showed that he employed natural substances such as egg and glue, as well as artificial materials including acrylic resins, phenol formaldehyde, modified alkyd, and others.

In 1968 Rothko, in declining health, began painting most of his large works in acrylic paint instead of oils.

=== European travels and increasing fame ===
Rothko and his wife visited Europe for five months in early 1950. The last time he had been in Europe was during his childhood in Latvia, at that time part of Russia. Yet he did not return to his homeland, preferring to visit the important painting collections in the major museums of England, France, and Italy. The frescoes of Fra Angelico in the monastery of San Marco, Florence, most impressed him. Fra Angelico's spirituality and concentration on light appealed to Rothko's sensibilities, as did the economic adversities the artist faced, which Rothko saw as similar to his own.

Rothko had one-man shows at the Betty Parsons Gallery in 1950 and 1951 and at other galleries across the world, including in Japan, São Paulo, and Amsterdam. The 1952 "Fifteen Americans" show curated by Dorothy Canning Miller at the Museum of Modern Art formally heralded the abstract artists and included works by Jackson Pollock and William Baziotes. It also created a dispute between Rothko and Barnett Newman, after Newman accused Rothko of having attempted to exclude him from the show. Growing success as a group was leading to infighting and claims of supremacy and leadership. When Fortune magazine named a Rothko painting in 1955 as a good investment, Newman and Clyfford Still branded him a sell-out with bourgeois aspirations. Still wrote to Rothko to ask that the paintings he had given him over the years be returned. Rothko was deeply depressed by his former friends' jealousy.

During the 1950 Europe trip, Rothko's wife, Mell, became pregnant. On December 30, when they were back in New York, she gave birth to a daughter, Kathy Lynn, called "Kate" in honor of Rothko's mother, Kate Goldin.

=== Reactions to his own success ===
Shortly thereafter, due to the Fortune magazine plug and further purchases by clients, Rothko's financial situation began to improve. In addition to sales of paintings, he also had money from his teaching position at Brooklyn College. In 1954, he exhibited in a solo show at the Art Institute of Chicago, where he met art dealer Sidney Janis, who represented Pollock and Franz Kline. Their relationship proved mutually beneficial.

Despite his fame, Rothko felt a growing personal seclusion and a sense of being misunderstood as an artist. He feared that people purchased his paintings simply out of fashion and that collectors, critics, and audiences were not grasping his work's true purpose. He wanted his paintings to move beyond abstraction, as well as beyond classical art. For Rothko, the paintings were objects that possessed their own form and potential and must be encountered as such. Sensing the futility of words in describing this decidedly nonverbal aspect of his work, Rothko abandoned all attempts at responding to those who inquired after its meaning and purpose, saying finally that silence is "so accurate":

My paintings' surfaces are expansive and push outward in all directions, or their surfaces contract and rush inward in all directions. Between these two poles, you can find everything I want to say.

Rothko began to insist that he was not an abstractionist and that such a description was as inaccurate as labeling him a great colorist. His interest was:

only in expressing basic human emotions—tragedy, ecstasy, doom, and so on. And the fact that a lot of people break down and cry when confronted with my pictures shows that I can communicate those basic human emotions ... The people who weep before my pictures are having the same religious experience I had when I painted them. And if you, as you say, are moved only by their color relationship, then you miss the point.

For Rothko, color was "merely an instrument", and the signature paintings were just a simpler, purer form of expressing the same basic human emotions as his surrealistic mythological paintings. Rothko's comment on viewers breaking down in tears before his paintings may have convinced the de Menils to construct the Rothko Chapel. As he grew older, around the late 1950s, the spiritual expression he meant to portray on canvas grew increasingly dark, and his bright reds, yellows, and oranges were subtly transformed into dark blues, greens, grays, and blacks.

Rothko's friend, the art critic Dore Ashton, points to the artist's acquaintance with poet Stanley Kunitz as a significant bond in this period ("conversations between painter and poet fed into Rothko's enterprise"). Kunitz saw Rothko as "a primitive, a shaman who finds the magic formula and leads people to it". Great poetry and painting, Kunitz believed, both had "roots in magic, incantation, and spell-casting" and were, at their core, ethical and spiritual. Kunitz instinctively understood the purpose of Rothko's quest.

In November 1958, Rothko gave an address to the Pratt Institute. In a tenor unusual for him, he discussed art as a trade and offered the

recipe of a work of art—its ingredients—how to make it—the formula

1. There must be a clear preoccupation with death—intimations of mortality ... Tragic art, romantic art, etc., deals with the knowledge of death.
2. Sensuality. Our basis of being concrete about the world. It is a lustful relationship with things that exist.
3. Tension. Either conflict or curbed desire.
4. Irony, This is a modern ingredient—the self-effacement and examination by which a man for an instant can go on to something else.
5. Wit and play ... for the human element.
6. The ephemeral and chance ... for the human element.
7. Hope. 10% to make the tragic concept more endurable.

I measure these ingredients very carefully when I paint a picture. It is always the form that follows these elements and the picture results from the proportions of these elements.

=== Seagram Murals–Four Seasons restaurant commission ===
In 1958, Rothko was awarded the first of two major mural commissions, which proved both rewarding and frustrating. The beverage company Joseph Seagram and Sons had recently completed the new Seagram Building skyscraper on Park Avenue, designed by architects Mies van der Rohe and Philip Johnson. Rothko agreed to provide paintings for the building's new luxury restaurant, the Four Seasons. This was, as art historian Simon Schama put it, "bring[ing] his monumental dramas right into the belly of the beast".

For Rothko, this Seagram murals commission presented a new challenge, since it was the first time he was required not only to design a coordinated series of paintings but to produce an artwork space concept for a large, specific interior. Over the following three months, Rothko completed forty paintings, comprising three full series in dark red and brown. He altered his horizontal format to vertical, to complement the restaurant's vertical features: columns, walls, doors, and windows.

The following June, Rothko and his family again traveled to Europe. While on the SS Independence he disclosed to journalist John Fischer, who was publisher of Harper's Magazine, that his true intention for the Seagram murals was to paint "something that will ruin the appetite of every son-of-a-bitch who ever eats in that room". He hoped, he told Fischer, that his painting would make the restaurant's patrons "feel that they are trapped in a room where all the doors and windows are bricked up, so that all they can do is butt their heads forever against the wall".

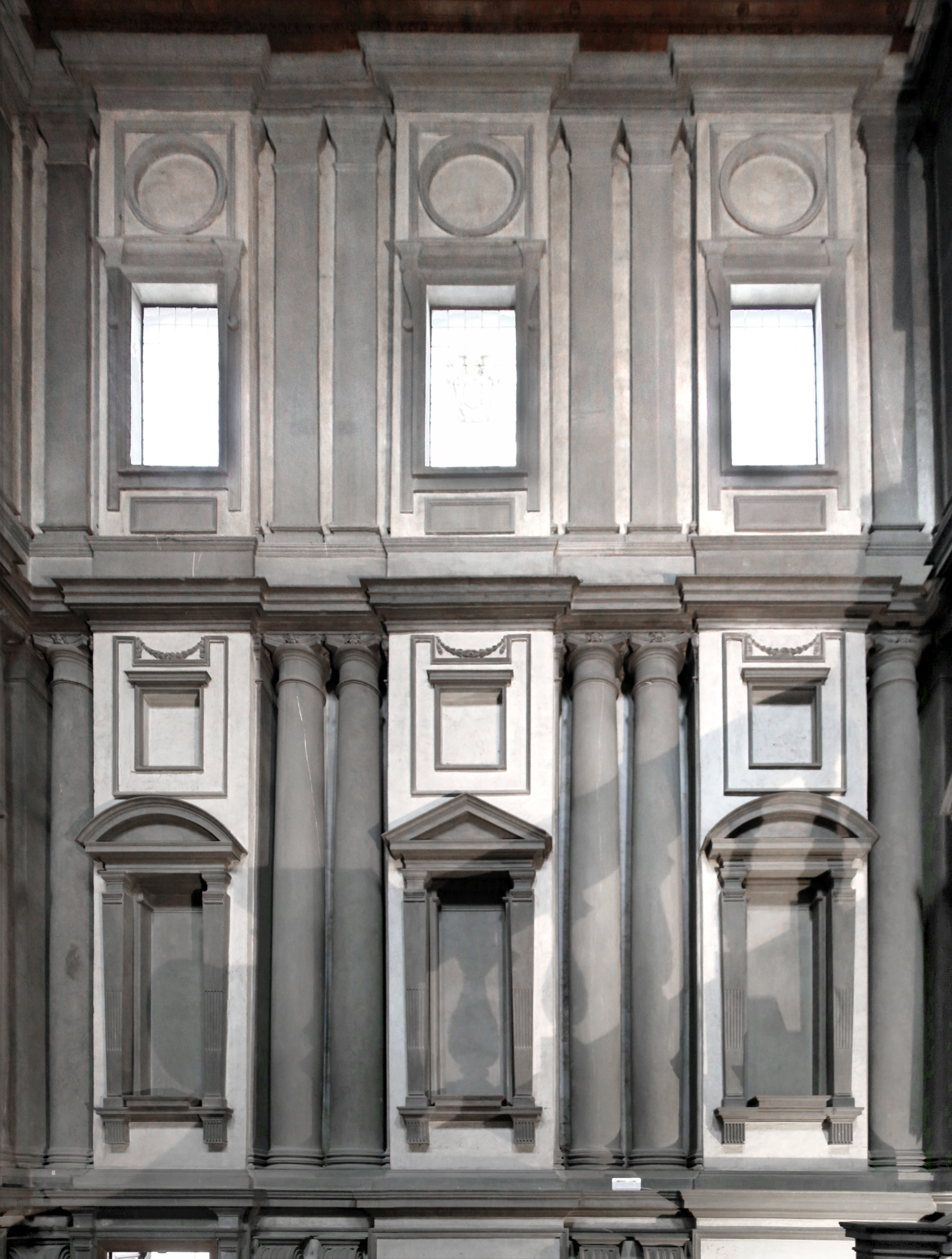
Vestibule of the Laurentian Library

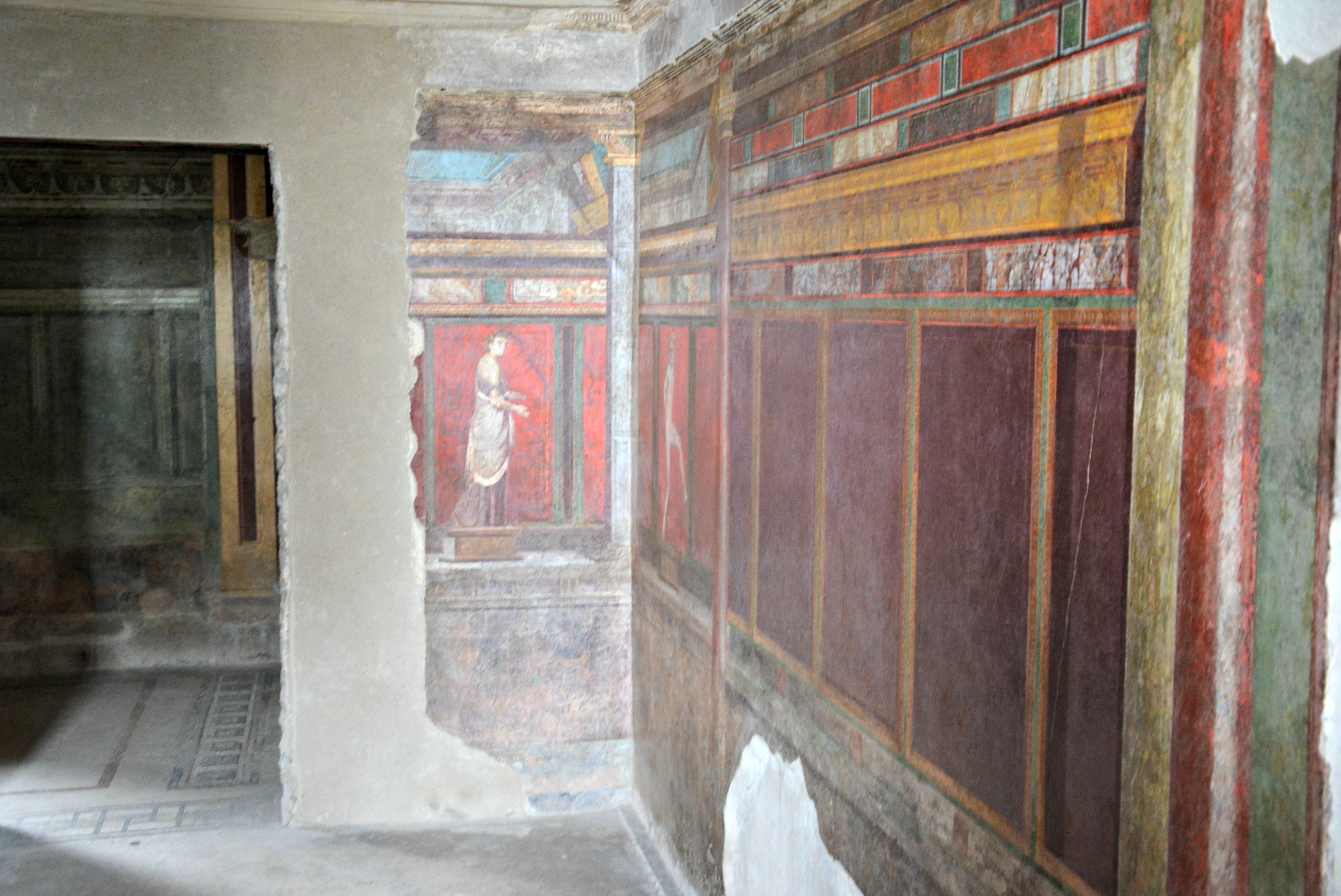
Frescoes in the Villa of the Mysteries

While in Europe, the Rothkos traveled to Rome, Florence, Venice, and Pompeii. In Florence, he visited Michelangelo's Laurentian Library, to see first-hand the library's vestibule, from which he drew further inspiration for the murals. He remarked that "the room had exactly the feeling that I wanted ... it gives the visitor the feeling of being caught in a room with the doors and windows walled-in shut." He was further influenced by the somber colors of the murals in the Pompeiian Villa of the Mysteries. Following the trip to Italy, the Rothkos voyaged to Paris, Brussels, Antwerp and Amsterdam, before going to London, where Rothko spent time in the British Museum studying the Turner watercolors. They then traveled to Somerset and stayed with the artist William Scott, who was just starting a large mural project, and they discussed the respective issues of public and private sponsorship. After the visit the Rothkos continued to St. Ives in the West of England and met up with Patrick Heron and other Cornish painters before returning to London and then the United States.

Back in New York, Rothko and his wife Mell visited the nearly completed Four Seasons restaurant. Upset with the restaurant's dining atmosphere, which he considered pretentious and inappropriate for the display of his works, Rothko refused to continue the project and returned his cash advance to the Seagram and Sons Company. Seagram had intended to honor Rothko's emergence to prominence through his selection, and his breach of contract and public expression of outrage was unexpected.

Rothko kept the commissioned paintings in storage until 1968. Given that Rothko had known in advance about the luxury decor of the restaurant, and the social class of its future patrons, the motives for his abrupt repudiation remain mysterious, although he did write to his friend William Scott in England, "Since we had discussed our respective murals I thought you might be interested to know that mine are still with me. When I returned, I looked again at my paintings and then visited the premises for which they were destined, it seemed clear to me at once that the two were not for each other." A temperamental personality, Rothko never fully explained his conflicted emotions over the incident. One reading is offered by his biographer, James E.B. Breslin: the Seagram project could be seen as an acting-out of a familiar, in this case self-created "drama of trust and betrayal, of advancing into the world, then withdrawing, angrily, from it ... He was an Isaac who at the last moment refused to yield to Abraham." The final series of Seagram Murals was dispersed, and now hangs in three locations: London's Tate Britain, Japan's Kawamura Memorial Museum, and the National Gallery of Art in Washington, D.C. This episode was the main basis for John Logan's 2009 play Red.

In October 2012, Black on Maroon, one of the paintings in the Seagram series, was defaced with writing in black ink, while on display at Tate Modern. Restoration of the painting took 18 months. The BBC's Arts Editor Will Gompertz explained that the ink from the vandal's marker pen had bled all the way through the canvas, causing "a deep wound, not a superficial graze", and that the vandal had caused "significant damage".

=== Rising American prominence ===
Rothko's first completed space was created in the Phillips Collection in Washington, D.C., following the purchase of four paintings by collector Duncan Phillips. Rothko's fame and wealth had substantially increased; his paintings began to sell to notable collectors, including the Rockefeller family. In January 1961, Rothko sat next to Joseph Kennedy at John F. Kennedy's inaugural ball. Later that year, a retrospective of his work was held at the Museum of Modern Art, to considerable commercial and critical success. In spite of this newfound fame, the art world had already turned its attention from the now passé abstract expressionists to the "next big thing", pop art, particularly the work of Warhol, Lichtenstein, and Rosenquist.

Rothko called pop artists "charlatans and young opportunists", and wondered aloud during a 1962 exhibition of pop art, "Are the young artists plotting to kill us all?" On viewing Jasper Johns's flags, Rothko said, "We worked for years to get rid of all that."

On August 31, 1963, Mell gave birth to a second child, Christopher. That autumn, Rothko signed with the Marlborough Gallery for sales of his work outside the United States. In New York, he continued to sell the artwork directly from his studio.

=== Harvard murals ===
Rothko received a second mural commission project, this time for a room of paintings for the penthouse of Harvard University's Holyoke Center. He made 22 sketches, from which ten wall-sized paintings on canvas were painted, six were brought to Cambridge, Massachusetts, and only five were hung: a triptych on one wall and opposite two individual panels. His aim was to create an environment for a public place. Harvard President Nathan Pusey, following an explanation of the religious symbology of the Triptych, had the paintings hung in January 1963, and later shown at the Guggenheim. During installation, Rothko found the paintings to be compromised by the room's lighting. Despite the installation of fiberglass shades, the paintings were all removed by 1979 and, due to the fugitive nature of some of the red pigments, in particular lithol red, were placed in dark storage and displayed only periodically. The murals were on display from November 16, 2014, to July 26, 2015, in the newly renovated Harvard Art Museums, for which the fading of the pigments has been compensated by using an innovative color projection system to illuminate the paintings.

=== Rothko Chapel ===
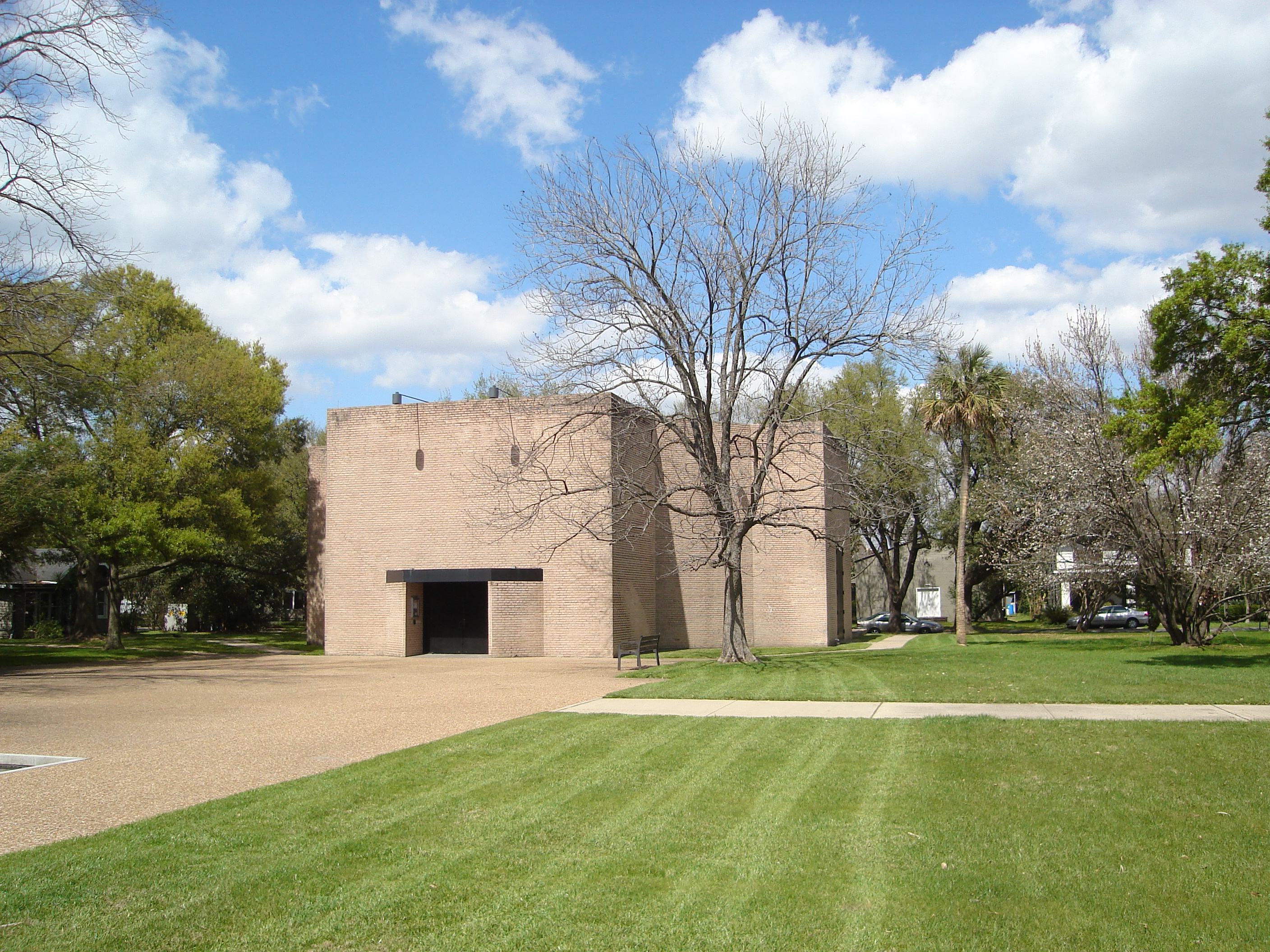
Rothko Chapel in Houston, Texas, North America

The Rothko Chapel is adjacent to the Menil Collection and the University of St. Thomas in Houston, Texas. The building is small and windowless except for a skylight and features a geometric, postmodern structure. The chapel, the Menil Collection, and the nearby Cy Twombly gallery were funded by Texas oil millionaires John and Dominique de Menil.

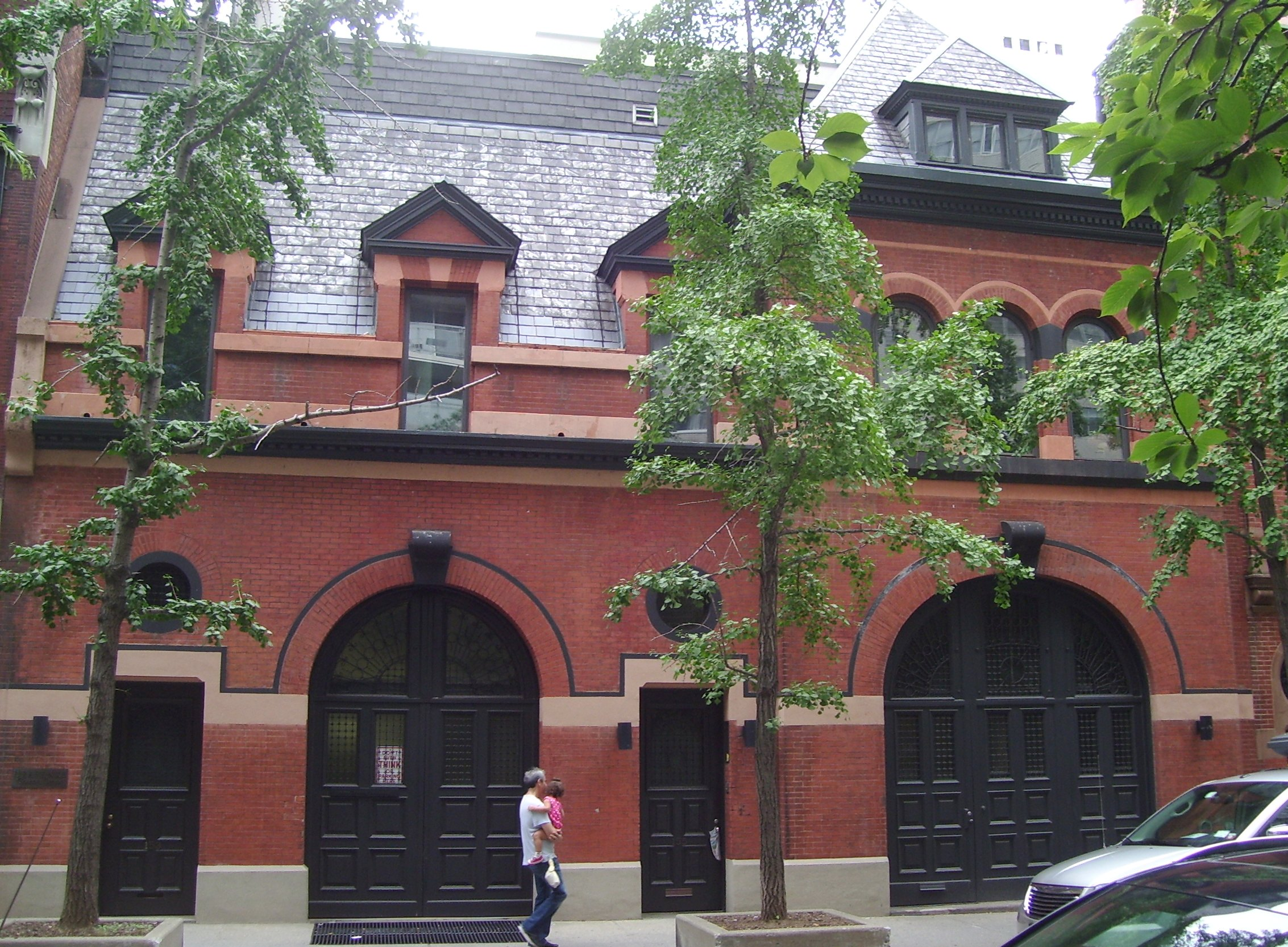
Rothko's studio on 153 East 69th Street in New York's Upper East Side

In 1964, Rothko moved into his last New York studio at 157 East 69th Street. To simulate the lighting he wanted for the chapel, he equipped the studio with pulleys carrying large walls of canvas material to regulate light from a central cupola. Rothko reportedly intended the chapel to be his most important artistic statement. He became extremely involved in the building's layout and insisted that it feature a central cupola like his studio's. Architect Philip Johnson, unable to compromise with Rothko's vision about the kind of light he wanted in the space, left the project in 1967 and was replaced by Howard Barnstone and Eugene Aubry. The architects frequently flew to New York to consult. On one occasion they brought a miniature of the building for Rothko's approval.

For Rothko, the chapel was a place of pilgrimage far from the center of art (in this case, New York) where seekers of his newly "religious" artwork could journey. The chapel is now nondenominational, but it was originally intended to be Roman Catholic. During the first three years of the project (1964–67), Rothko believed it would remain so. The building's design and the paintings' religious implications were inspired by Roman Catholic art and architecture. Its octagonal shape is based on a Byzantine church of St. Maria Assunta, and the format of the triptychs is based on paintings of the Crucifixion. The de Menils believed the universal "spiritual" aspect of Rothko's work would complement the elements of Roman Catholicism.

Rothko's painting technique necessitated physical strength and stamina that the ailing artist could no longer muster. He hired two assistants to apply the multiple layers of paint. On half of the works, Rothko applied none of the paint himself and was content to supervise the slow, arduous process. He felt the completion of the paintings to be "torment", and the inevitable result was to create "something you don't want to look at".

The chapel represents six years of Rothko's life and his growing concern for the transcendent. For some, viewing the chapel's three paintings is akin to submitting to a spiritual experience. The paintings have been likened to self-awareness, hermeticism, and contemplativeness.

The chapel paintings consist of a monochrome triptych in soft brown, on the central wall, comprising three 5-by-15-foot panels and a pair of triptychs on the left and right made of opaque black rectangles. Between the triptychs are four individual paintings, measuring 11-by-15 feet each. One additional individual painting faces the central triptych, from the opposite wall. The effect is to surround the viewer with massive, imposing visions of darkness. Despite its basis in religious symbolism and imagery, the paintings may be considered distinct from traditional Christian motifs and may act on the viewers subliminally. Rothko's erasure of symbols both removes and creates barriers to the work.

The paintings were unveiled at the chapel's opening in 1971. Rothko never saw the completed chapel and never installed the paintings. On February 28, 1971, at the dedication, Dominique de Menil said, "We are cluttered with images and only abstract art can bring us to the threshold of the divine", noting Rothko's courage in painting "impenetrable fortresses" of color.

== Suicide and estate lawsuit ==
In early 1968, Rothko was diagnosed with a mild aortic aneurysm. Ignoring doctor's orders, he continued to drink and smoke heavily, avoided exercise, and maintained an unhealthy diet. "Highly nervous, thin, restless", was his friend Dore Ashton's description of Rothko at this time. But Rothko did take the medical advice not to paint pictures taller than three feet, and turned his attention to smaller, less physically strenuous formats, including acrylics on paper. Meanwhile, his marriage became increasingly troubled, and his poor health and impotence resulting from the aneurysm compounded his feeling of estrangement in the relationship. Rothko and Mell, who had been married from 1944, separated on New Year's Day 1969; he moved into his studio.

On February 25, 1970, Oliver Steindecker, Rothko's assistant, found the artist lying dead on the kitchen floor in front of the sink, covered in blood. He had overdosed on barbiturates and cut an artery in his right arm with a razor blade. There was no suicide note. He was 66. The Seagram Murals arrived in London for display at the Tate Gallery on the day of his suicide.

Near the end of his life, Rothko painted a series known as the "Black on Grays", uniformly featuring a black rectangle above a gray rectangle. These canvases and Rothko's later work in general have been associated with his depression and suicide, although the association has been criticized. Rothko's suicide has been studied in medical literature, where his later paintings have been interpreted as "pictorial suicide notes" due to their somber palettes and especially in contrast to the brighter colors Rothko employed more frequently during the 1950s. Although art critic David Anfam acknowledged that the Black and Grays are interpreted as premonitions of suicide or as "moonscapes" (the first Apollo Moon landings were contemporaneous with their execution), he rejected the interpretations as "naive", arguing instead that the paintings were a continuation of his lifelong artistic themes and not symptoms of depression. Susan Grange observed that, after his aneurysm, Rothko executed several smaller works on paper using lighter hues, which are less well-known. Throughout his life Rothko consistently intended his works to evoke serious dramatic content, regardless of the colors used in a particular painting. When a woman visited his studio asking to buy a "happy" painting featuring warm colors, Rothko retorted, "Red, yellow, orange – aren't those the colors of an inferno?"

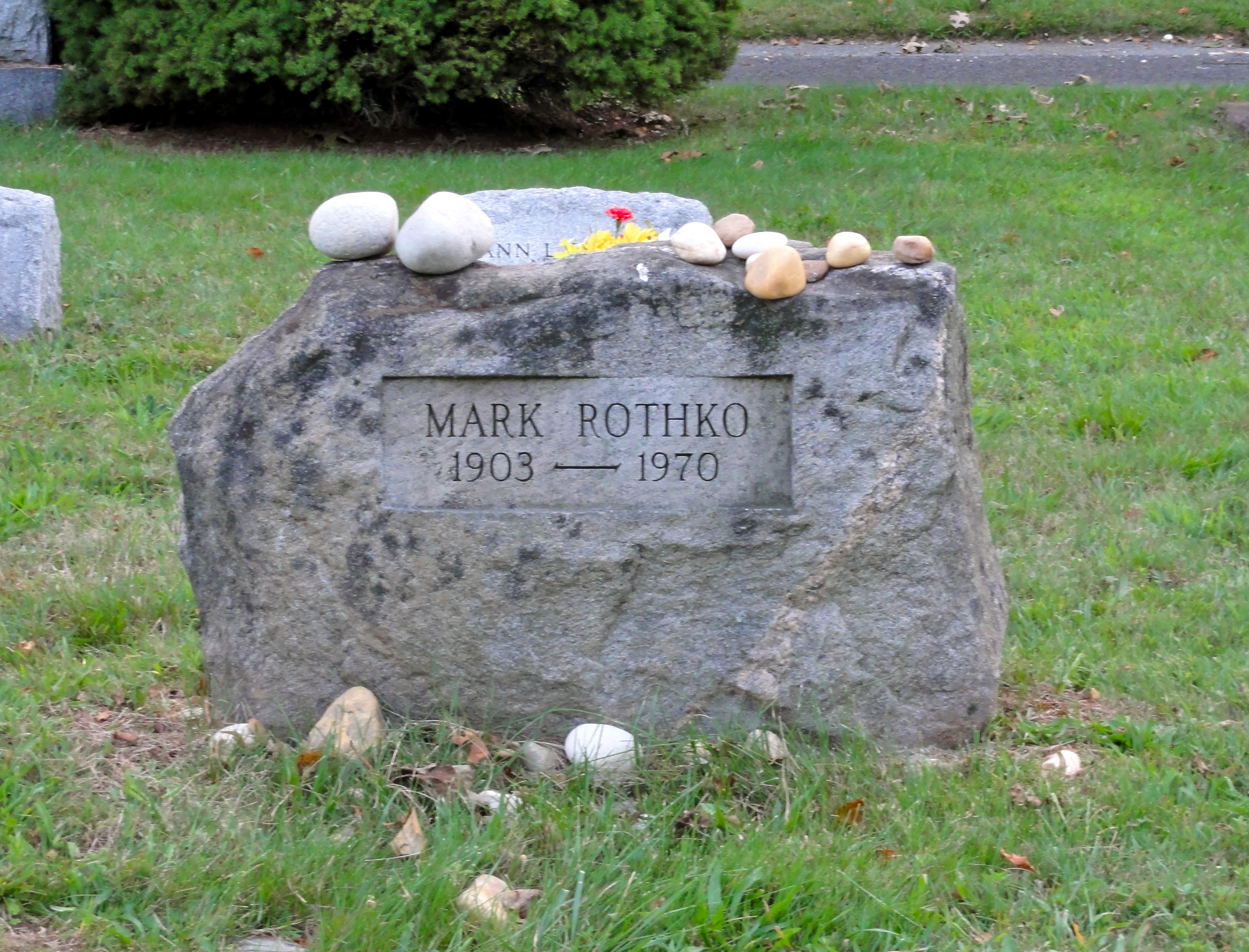
Rothko's grave at East Marion Cemetery, East Marion, New York

Shortly before his death, Rothko and his financial advisor, Bernard Reis, created a foundation intended to fund "research and education" that received the bulk of Rothko's work after his death. Reis later sold the paintings to the Marlborough Gallery, at substantially reduced values, and then split the profits from sales with Gallery representatives. In 1971, Rothko's daughter Kate, who was 19 at the time of his death, sued Reis, Morton Levine, and Theodore Stamos, the executors of his estate, over the sham sales. The lawsuit continued for more than 10 years and became known as the Rothko Case. In 1975, the defendants were found liable for negligence and conflict of interest, were removed as executors of the Rothko estate by court order, and, along with Marlborough Gallery, were required to pay $9.2 million in damages to the estate. This amount represents only a small fraction of the eventual value of numerous Rothko works. Marlborough Gallery was also required to return the remaining 658 unsold paintings to two parties. One half of the remaining paintings were given to Rothko's estate, which was now controlled by Kate in addition to, eventually, her brother Christopher, who was 6 years old at the time of Rothko's death. The other half were given to the Mark Rothko Foundation, which the court had reestablished as part of the lawsuit proceedings, appointing investment banker and art collector Donald M. Blinken as the foundation's president.

Rothko's estranged wife Mell, also a heavy drinker, died six months after him at the age of 48. The cause of death was listed as "hypertension due to cardiovascular disease".

== Legacy ==
After being reestablished by the court during the lawsuit proceedings following Rothko's death, the Mark Rothko Foundation donated the entirety of its holdings of Rothko's art to 35 museums and art institutions in the United States and Europe. Separately from the foundation, Kate and Christopher, as the executors of Rothko's estate following the lawsuit, have donated several of their holdings of Rothko's art to museums, and, as of 2021, continued to sell paintings from the estate's collection through Pace Gallery.

Rothko's complete works on canvas, 836 paintings, have been catalogued by art historian David Anfam, in his Mark Rothko: The Works on Canvas: Catalogue Raisonné (1998), published by Yale University Press.

A previously unpublished manuscript by Rothko, The Artist's Reality (2004), about his philosophies on art, edited by his son Christopher, was published by Yale University Press.

Red, a play by John Logan based on Rothko's life, opened at the Donmar Warehouse in London, on December 3, 2009. The play, starring Alfred Molina and Eddie Redmayne, centered on the period of the Seagram Murals. This drama received excellent reviews and usually played to full houses. In 2010 Red opened on Broadway, where it won six Tony Awards, including Best Play. Molina played Rothko in both London and New York. A recording of Red was produced in 2018 for Great Performances with Molina playing Rothko and Alfred Enoch playing his assistant.

In Rothko's birthplace, the Latvian city of Daugavpils, a monument to him, designed by sculptor Romualds Gibovskis, was unveiled on the bank of the Daugava River in 2003. In 2013 the Mark Rothko Art Centre opened in Daugavpils after the Rothko family had donated a small collection of his original works.

A number of Rothko's works are held by the Museo Nacional Centro de Arte Reina Sofía and by the Thyssen-Bornemisza Museum, both in Madrid. The Governor Nelson A. Rockefeller Empire State Plaza Art Collection in Albany, New York includes both Rothko's painting Untitled (1967) and a large mural by Al Held, Rothko's Canvas (1969–70).

Fashion designer Hubert de Givenchy showed fabrics inspired by Rothko in 1971. A number of musical compositions have been inspired by Rothko's work, including Adam Schoenberg's Finding Rothko (2006), Anna Clyne's Color Field (2020), and Paris Paloma's "Rothko" (2026).

== Exhibitions ==
From 23 September 1987 to 3 January 1988, the Fundación Juan March, Madrid exhibited Mark Rothko, the first to be devoted to his work in Spain. It included paintings produced over 40 years.

In 2023, the Fondation Louis Vuitton in Paris staged a landmark retrospective co-curated by Christopher Rothko, the artist’s son. The exhibition brought together 115 works spanning Rothko’s entire career, including early figurative paintings, key abstract canvases, and late “black on gray” works. The Phillips Collection loaned its Orange and Red on Red (1957), Green and Tangerine on Red (1956), and Ochre and Red on Red (1954) to the exhibition; during this time Kate Rothko Prizel and Christopher Rothko loaned The Phillips Collection Untitled (Yellow, Pink, Yellow on Light Pink) (1955), No. 14 (1951), and No. 12 (1951) which The Phillips installed in its Rothko Room.

From March 14 to August 23, 2026, Fondazione Palazzo Strozzi exhibited Rothko in Florence, curated by Christopher Rothko and Elena Geuna. The exhibit traced his career and examined his “special bond with Florence” and was accompanied by exhibits at the Museo di San Marco (where some works will be presented with the frescoes of Fra Angelico) and the Vestibule of the Biblioteca Medicea Laurenziana.

== Resale market ==
Prices for Rothko's work on the secondary market and at auction rose significantly toward the end of his career and after his death, and have consistently remained among the highest for works of art by a modern or contemporary artist. Three years prior to his death, a work by Rothko sold on the secondary market for $22,000; in 2003 a painting by Rothko sold for $7,175,000. Rothko's paintings sold at successively higher prices at auction through the mid-2010s, reaching $86.8 million in 2012, a record for Rothko and, at the time, a new nominal value record for any postwar painting sold at a public auction.

Works by Rothko have continued to regularly achieve prices at auction ranging as high as $80 million through the 2020s. His painting No. 6 (Violet, Green and Red) sold in 2014 for $186 million.

== See also ==
- Rothko Pavilion

== Sources ==
- Anfam, David (1998). Mark Rothko: The Works on Canvas. Yale University Press. ISBN 0-300-07489-1. OCLC 231779179.
- Ashton, Dore (1983). About Rothko. New York: Oxford University Press. ISBN 0-19-503348-5. OCLC 9219133.
- Baal-Teshuva, Jacob (2003). Mark Rothko, 1903-1970: Pictures as Drama. Taschen. ISBN 978-3-8365-0426-3. OCLC 1235697992.
- Breslin, James E. B. (1993). Mark Rothko: A Biography. Chicago: University of Chicago Press. ISBN 0-226-07405-6. OCLC 27811705.
- Grange, Susan (2016). Mark Rothko: Break Into the Light. Fulham, London. ISBN 978-1-78361-999-3. OCLC 945949663.
- Nietzsche, Friedrich Wilhelm (2000). Basic Writings of Nietzsche. Translated by Kaufmann, Walter. New York: Modern Library. ISBN 0-679-78339-3. OCLC 44883577.
- Simon, Schama (2006). The Power of Art. HarperCollins. ISBN 978-0-06-117610-4. OCLC 135513094.
