= Edward Alden Jewell =

American writer and art critic

- Born: March 10, 1888; Grand Rapids, Michigan, U.S.
- Died: October 11, 1947 (aged 59); New York, New York
- Occupations: Newspaper and magazine editor, art critic, novelist
- Years active: 1911–1947

Edward Alden Jewell (March 10, 1888 – October 11, 1947) was an American newspaper and magazine editor, art critic and novelist. He was the New York Times art editor from July 1936 until his death.

== Early life ==
Born in Grand Rapids, Michigan, E. A. Jewell was the eldest of four children born to Frank Jewell and Jenny Agnes Osterhout. After attending high school in Grand Rapids, Jewell studied at the Sidwell Friends School in Washington, D.C. Between the ages of 8 and 22, Jewell displayed intense interest in the theatre and acting, and toured for a time with the Kansas City-based stage actor Louis James.

== Career ==
After studying abroad in 1910 and 1911, Jewell worked as a reporter and later drama critic at the Grand Rapids Herald, a paper whose then-proprietor was his uncle, Senator William Alden Smith, to whom Jewell later served as secretary in 1914 and 1915.

In 1915, Jewell worked briefly at The New York Tribune before becoming managing editor of the World Court Magazine the following year. in 1916 and 1917, he was an associate editor at Everybody's Magazine before returning to the Tribune as Sunday editor.

Jewell's first novel, The Charmed Circle, was evidently well regarded, receiving favorable reviews from Carl Van Doren in Bookman and H. W. Boynton in The Independent.

Beginning in 1925, Jewell was employed as both an editor and contributor by The New York Times Sunday Magazine, and in 1928 became the assistant to the Times art critic Elisabeth Luther Cary. Jewell succeeded Cary in that role at the time of her death in 1936.

== Death ==
After being stricken by an undisclosed illness on the night of October 11, 1947, Jewell died while being transported from his East 55th Street Manhattan address to Metropolitan Hospital on Roosevelt Island. He was survived by former wife Manette Lansing Carpenter and their daughter Marcia, both then living in California. As per his instructions, there was no funeral and Jewell's remains were cremated at the Fresh Pond Crematory in Queens.

== Works ==
=== Fiction ===
==== Novels ====
- The Charmed Circle: A Comedy (1921)
- The White Kami: A Novel (1922)
- The Moth Decides: A Novel (1922)

==== Short stories ====
- "Night-Letter to Louisville", The Century Magazine, April 1923; Vol. 105, No. 6, pp. 833–846
- "Their Little Point of Honor; An American Story", World Fiction, October 1922, pp. 111–120

=== Non-fiction ===
==== Books ====
- Have We an American Art?. New York: Longmans, Green & Company. 1939.

==== Articles ====
- "The Future for Poetry in America: An Interview with Amy Lowell". The Editor. January 15, 1916. Vol. 43, No. 2. pp. 65–68
- "A Philosophy Close to the Earth". The World Court, A Magazine of International Progress, Volume 1. January 1916, Vol. 1, No. 6., pp. 280–281
- "Japan's Tremendous Mistake". National Magazine. July, 1916. Vol. XLIV, No. 4. pp. 644–646
- "The Lost Japan". The Nation. September 19, 1923. Vol. 117, No. 3037, pp. 287–289
