= Emily Genauer =

American art critic (1911–2002)

- Genauer in 1956
- Born: July 19, 1911; Staten Island, United States
- Died: August 23, 2002 (aged 91)

Emily Genauer (July 19, 1911 – August 23, 2002) was an American art critic for the New York World, the New York Herald Tribune, and Newsday. She won the Pulitzer Prize for Criticism in 1974.

== Biography ==
She was born on Staten Island in 1911, to a delicatessen-owning father who was an amateur sculptor. After studying at Hunter College and Columbia University's Graduate School of Journalism, she went to work as a writer for the New York World, eventually becoming a critic in the 1930s. After she married Frederick Gash, she retained her maiden name as her byline.

She was instrumental in introducing modern artists to her readers, championing Marc Chagall and Diego Rivera. She quit the newspaper (which had become the New York World-Telegram after a merger) in 1949, during the Cold War, when World-Telegram president Roy W. Howard complained that she was promoting left-wing artists like Pablo Picasso. Genauer joined the New York Herald Tribune, where she was the art critic through 1967. She then went to work for Newsday, which syndicated her work.

Genauer also wrote books and served on the National Council on the Humanities from 1966 to 1970. She won the Pulitzer Prize for Criticism in 1974.
