= De Ménil =

de Ménil or de Menil is a surname, and may refer to:

- Christophe de Menil (1933–2025), American heiress and costume designer, daughter of Dominique and John de Menil
- Dominique de Menil (1908–1997), French-American art collector, wife of John de Menil
- Félicien Menu de Ménil (1860–1930), French composer
- Georges de Ménil (born 1940), French economist and political commentator, son of Dominique and John de Menil
- John de Menil (1904–1973), Franco-American businessman and art patron
- Philippa de Menil, birth name of Fariha al Jerrahi (born 1947), American art curator, daughter of Dominique and John de Menil

== See also ==
- Ménil, commune in France
- René Ménil, surrealist from Martinique
- Mesnil (surname)
