= Dominique de Menil =

American art collector (1908–1997)

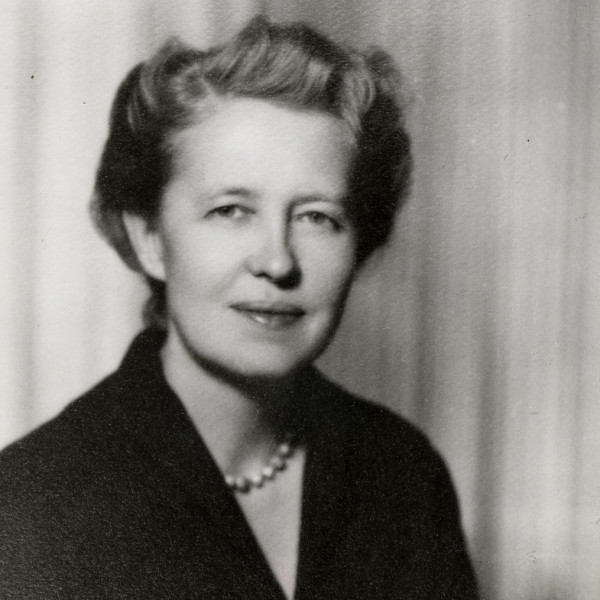
- Dominique de Menil
- Born: Dominique Isaline Zelia Henriette Clarisse Schlumberger; March 23, 1908; Paris, France
- Died: December 31, 1997 (aged 89); Houston, Texas, U.S.
- Spouse: John de Menil (m. 1931; died 1973)
- Children: 5 (including George de Menil and Philippa de Menil)
- Relatives: Sisters: Anne Gruner Schlumberger (1905-1993), Sylvie Boissonnas (1912-1999)

Dominique de Menil (née Schlumberger; March 23, 1908 – December 31, 1997) was a French-American art collector, philanthropist, founder of the Menil Collection and an heiress to the Schlumberger Limited oil equipment fortune. She was awarded the National Medal of Arts in 1986.

== Early life ==
De Menil was born Dominique Isaline Zelia Henriette Clarisse Schlumberger, the daughter of Conrad Schlumberger and Louise Schlumberger (née Delpech), Calvinist Alsatians. She studied physics and mathematics at the Sorbonne and developed an interest in filmmaking, which took her to Berlin to serve as script assistant on the Josef von Sternberg production of The Blue Angel. She also published articles on film technology in the French journal La revue du cinéma.

In 1930 she met the banker Jean de Ménil (who later anglicized his name to John de Menil), and they were married the next year. Raised a Protestant, Dominique converted to Roman Catholicism in 1932. The de Menils' Catholic faith, especially their interest in the Catholic theologian Yves Congar's teachings on ecumenism, would become crucial to the development of their collecting ethos in the coming decades. They had five children: Marie-Christophe (who was married to Robert Thurman and was the grandmother of artist Dash Snow), Adelaide (a photographer who is the widow of anthropologist Edmund Snow Carpenter), George de Menil (an economist), François (a filmmaker and architect), and Philippa (co-founder of the Dia Art Foundation and the leader of a Sufi order in Lower Manhattan).

Following the outbreak of World War II and the Nazi occupation of France, the de Menils emigrated from Paris to the United States of America. They maintained residences in New York and France but settled in Houston, where John would eventually become president of Schlumberger Overseas (Middle and Far East) and Schlumberger Surenco (Latin America), two branches of the Houston-based oilfield services corporation.

== Collecting art ==
John and Dominique de Menil began collecting art intensively in the 1940s, beginning with a purchase of Paul Cézanne's 1895 painting Montagne (Mountain) in 1945. With the guidance of the Dominican priest Marie-Alain Couturier, who introduced the de Menils to the work of artists in galleries and museums in New York, they became interested in the intersection of modern art and spirituality. They ultimately amassed more than 17,000 paintings, sculptures, decorative objects, prints, drawings, photographs, and rare books.

De Menil with gallery model, Houston, 1973

The de Menils were particularly interested in modern European art, and a core strength of the collection was the many Cubist, Surrealist, and other Modernist works they acquired. By the 1960s the de Menils had gravitated toward the major American post-war movements of abstract expressionism, pop art, and minimalism. Over the years the family enjoyed close personal friendships with many of the artists whose work they collected, including Victor Brauner, Max Ernst, Jasper Johns, Yves Klein, René Magritte, Robert Rauschenberg, Dorothea Tanning, and Andy Warhol.

The de Menils, however, did not limit their acquisitions to modern art, and their eclectic tastes became a hallmark of their collecting practices. As modernists, they recognized the profound formal and spiritual connections between contemporary works of art and the arts of ancient and indigenous cultures, broadening their collection to include works from classical Mediterranean and Byzantine cultures, as well as objects from Africa, Oceania, and the Pacific Northwest. De Menil credited dealer and adviser John Klejman with shaping their tastes in African and Oceanic objects, saying that he "made buying African art very tempting". They bought more than two hundred pieces from Klejman's New York Gallery. Influenced by the teachings of Father Couturier and Father Congar, the de Menils developed a particular humanist ethos in which they understood art as a central part of the human experience. Their collection was motivated by their shared interest in the many ways individuals over different cultures and eras reveal through art their understanding of what it means to be human.

== Art patron ==
After moving to Houston, the de Menils quickly became key figures in the city's developing cultural life as advocates of modern art and architecture. In 1949 they commissioned the architect Philip Johnson to design their home in the River Oaks neighborhood in Houston. One of the first International Style residences in Texas, it generated controversy not only by standing out amongst the mansions of River Oaks but also by pairing Johnson's clean, modernist lines with a bold color palette and eclectic interior design by Charles James. The de Menils filled their home with art and hosted many of the leading artists, scientists, civil rights activists, and intellectuals of the day.

Spurred in part by the lack of a real arts community in Houston, in the 1950s and 1960s the de Menils promoted modern art through exhibitions held at the Contemporary Arts Association (later the Contemporary Arts Museum Houston), such as Max Ernst's first solo exhibition in the United States, and the Museum of Fine Arts, Houston, to which they gave important gifts of art. They were instrumental in the Contemporary Arts Association's decision to hire Jermayne MacAgy as its director; she curated several groundbreaking exhibitions, including "The Sphere of Mondrian" and "Totems Not Taboo: An Exhibition of Primitive Art." In 1954 they founded the Menil Foundation, a non-profit organization dedicated to the "support and advancement of religious, charitable, literary, scientific and educational purposes".

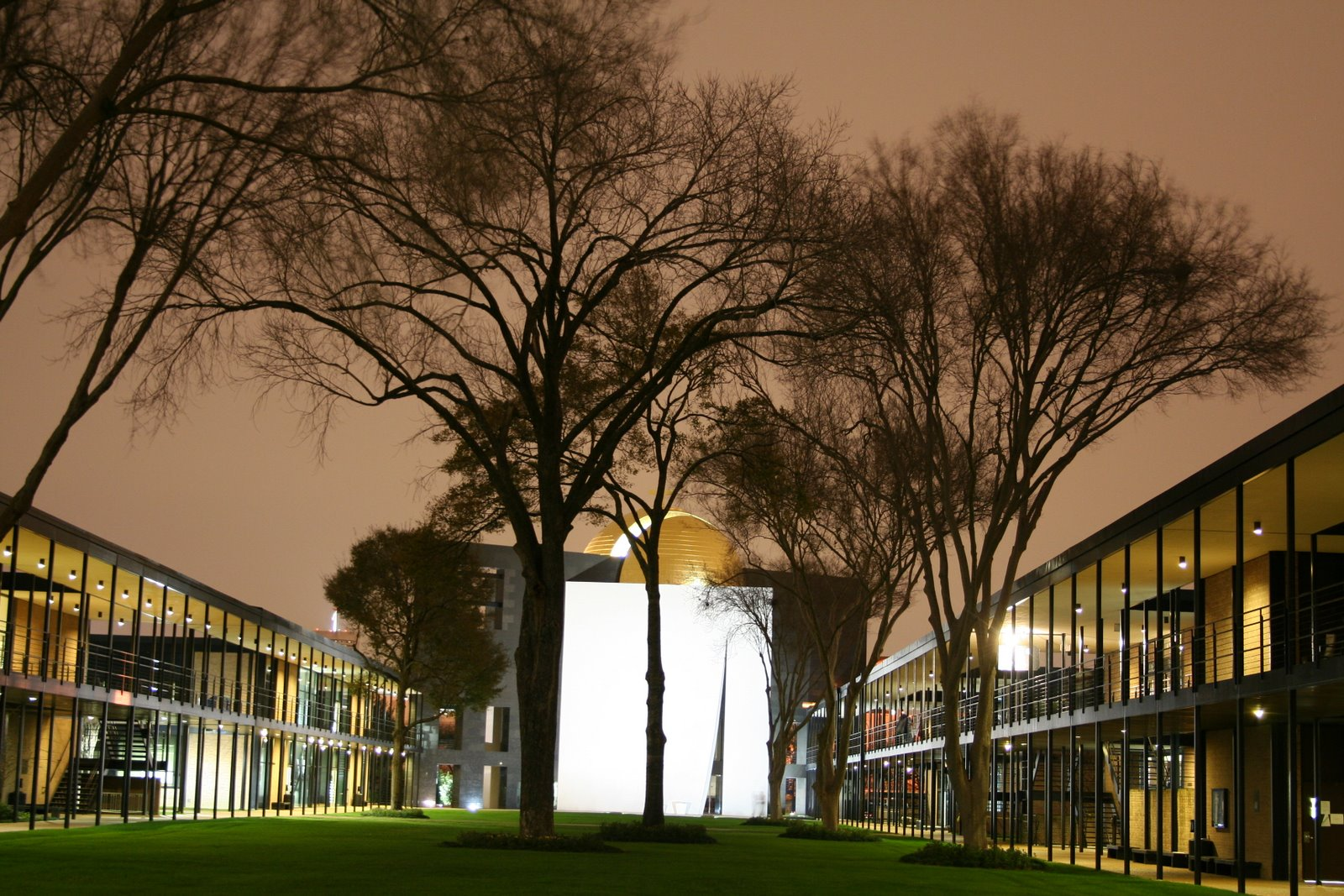
Strake and Jones Halls, designed by Philip Johnson, University of St. Thomas, Houston

That same year they provided the University of St. Thomas, a small Catholic institution in Houston, with funding to build Strake Hall and Jones Hall, designed by Philip Johnson per their recommendation. In an effort to provide a strong art history curriculum in Houston for students and adults, they founded the art department at the University of St. Thomas in 1959, inviting Jermayne MacAgy to teach courses and curate exhibitions held at Jones Hall. They established the university's Media Center in 1967. The de Menils often personally recruited faculty members for the departments and brought many renowned artists and art historians to Houston, including Marcel Duchamp, Roberto Matta, and James Johnson Sweeney, whom they convinced to serve as museum director for the Museum of Fine Arts, Houston from 1961 to 1967. After Jermayne MacAgy's death in 1964, de Menil took over her classes and became the chairperson of the art department at the University of St. Thomas, curating several exhibitions over the next few years.

After being met with increasing resistance by the more traditional Basilian clergy at the University of St. Thomas, in 1969 the de Menils moved the art department—including the art history faculty—and Media Center to Rice University, where they founded the Institute for the Arts to manage the exhibition program at Rice Museum. Notable exhibitions at Rice Museum organized with the help of the de Menils were "The Machine as Seen at the End of the Mechanical Age", curated by Pontus Hulten for the Museum of Modern Art, New York, and "Raid the Icebox 1 with Andy Warhol", an exhibition of objects selected by Warhol from the storage vaults of the Museum of Art at Rhode Island School of Design. At Rice, the de Menils also cultivated their interest in film, working with such noted filmmakers as Roberto Rossellini, who made several trips to Houston to teach Rice University students and create television documentaries. The de Menils supported Rice University astrophysics professor Donald D. Clayton for a two-week residence in Rome in June–July 1970 for daily work with Rossellini, conceiving a film about cosmology that did not advance to filming but that was published in 1975 as a personal memoir of a life discovering the universe. Other filmmakers who visited the Media Center included Ola Balogun, Bernardo Bertolucci, James Blue, Jim McBride, and Colin Young.

John and Dominique de Menil also shared an interest in photography, inviting photographers to come to Houston to document events in the city and exhibit their work. They commissioned Henri Cartier-Bresson to photograph the 1957 American Federation of Arts convention, held in Houston that year, and worked with photographers such as Frederick Baldwin and Wendy Watriss, who went on to establish FotoFest, and Geoff Winningham, who served as head of the photography department at Rice Media Center. Photography became an important component of the collection, which includes works by Eve Arnold, Henri Cartier-Bresson, Danny Lyon, Hans Namuth, and Eve Sonneman.

== Civil and human rights ==
In addition to becoming known as collectors and patrons of art, John and Dominique de Menil were vocal champions of human rights worldwide. Their actions in Houston focused upon the Civil Rights Movement in particular. In 1960 they launched the ambitious scholarly research project "The Image of the Black in Western Art," directed by art historian Ladislas Bugner. An ongoing project that seeks to catalogue and study the depiction of individuals of African descent in Western art, it is now under the aegis of The Warburg Institute and Harvard University.

Their most controversial action on behalf of civil rights was their offer of Barnett Newman's Broken Obelisk as a partial gift to the city of Houston in 1969, on the condition that it be dedicated to the recently assassinated Martin Luther King Jr. The city refused the gift, sparking a controversial debate that ended only when the de Menils purchased the sculpture themselves and placed it in front of the newly completed Rothko Chapel.

The de Menils had originally made plans to build the Rothko Chapel in 1964 when Dominique de Menil commissioned a suite of meditative paintings by Mark Rothko for an ecumenical chapel intended for the University of St. Thomas as a space of dialogue and reflection between faiths. After undergoing revisions by several architects, including Philip Johnson, Howard Barnstone, and Eugene Aubry, the non-denominational Rothko Chapel was dedicated on Menil Foundation property in 1971 in a ceremony that included members of various religions. It was established as an autonomous organization the next year and began hosting colloquia, beginning with "Traditional Modes of Contemplation and Action," which brought together religious leaders, scholars, and musicians from four continents.

The de Menils also organized exhibitions that promoted human and civil rights, including The De Luxe Show, a 1971 exhibition of contemporary art held in Houston's Fifth Ward, a historically African-American neighborhood. Coordinated by civil rights activist and later U.S. Congressman Mickey Leland, it was one of the first racially integrated art shows in the United States.

In 1986, de Menil deepened her involvement in social causes, establishing the Carter-Menil Human Rights Foundation with former president Jimmy Carter to "promote the protection of human rights throughout the world". The Foundation offered the Carter–Menil Human Rights Prize, sponsored by the Rothko Chapel, to organizations or individuals for their commitment to human rights. She also established the Óscar Romero Award, named after the slain El Salvadoran bishop.

== Plans for a museum ==
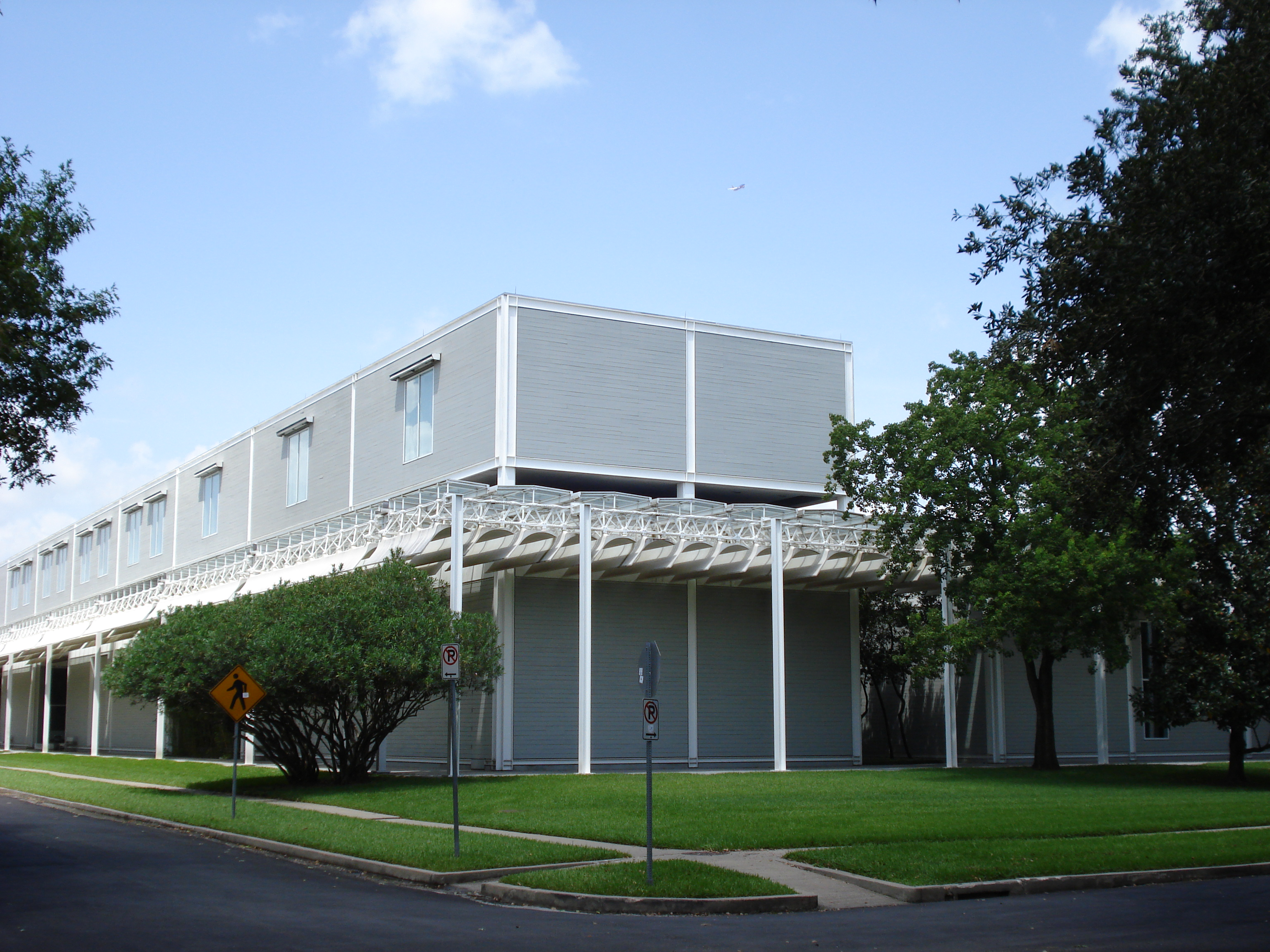
Southeast corner of the Menil Collection, Houston

Plans to create a museum to house and exhibit John and Dominique de Menil's collection began as early as 1972 when they asked the architect Louis I. Kahn to design a museum campus on Menil Foundation property in the Montrose neighborhood of Houston near the Rothko Chapel. Kahn did produce some preliminary drawings, but the project was suspended in 1973 after John de Menil's and Kahn's deaths less than a year apart.

In the 1980s de Menil again began looking for an architect to design the museum, eventually commissioning Renzo Piano, a renowned Italian architect known for his provocative Centre Georges Pompidou building in Paris, to come up with a design that would fit her vision for the museum. "I dreamed of preserving some of the intimacy I had enjoyed with works of art," she wrote. "We would show only portions of the Collection at a time, but displayed in generous and attractive space... The public would never know museum fatigue and would have the rare joy of sitting in front of a painting and contemplating it... Works would appear, disappear, and reappear like actors on a stage." Piano's understated design for the Menil Collection echoed the architecture of the surrounding bungalows, which had been painted gray by the Menil Foundation, and featured a roof of canopy leaves that allowed filtered natural light to fill the galleries. The result was a museum that appeared "small on the outside, but...as big as possible inside".

Dedicated on June 7, 1987, the Menil Collection exhibits objects from John and Dominique de Menil's collection, including selections of African Art, a vast collection of Surrealist pieces, and the work of a number of contemporary American artists such as Jackson Pollock, Barnett Newman, Clyfford Still, Robert Motherwell, Cy Twombly, and Mark Rothko. It also features temporary exhibitions. It is often cited as one of the most significant privately assembled art collections, alongside the Barnes Foundation and the J. Paul Getty Museum.

The nearby Cy Twombly Gallery, opened in 1995, houses more than thirty of Twombly's paintings, sculptures, and works on paper. Designed by Renzo Piano, the permanent gallery echoes some of the architectural features of the Menil Collection, such as the use of diffused natural light, while retaining its own, separate identity.

The Menil campus also includes the Byzantine Fresco Chapel. When de Menil learned that a group of 13th-century Byzantine frescoes had been stolen from a chapel in Lysi, Cyprus, and cut up by smugglers, she paid the ransom and funded their restoration. In return for her efforts, the Holy Bishopric of Cyprus allowed the works to remain in Houston on a 20-year loan. The frescoes—a dome with Christ Pantokrator and an apse depicting the Virgin Mary Panayia—were installed in a reliquary-like space interior where they were displayed until March 2012, at which time they were returned to the Church of Cyprus. The building was designed by architect Francois de Menil and mimics the original Lysi chapel.

De Menil's final project was a 1996 commission of three site-specific light installations by Minimalist sculptor Dan Flavin for Richmond Hall, a former Weingarten's grocery store in Houston. The Dan Flavin installation consists of two horizontal green fluorescent lights on the eastern and western sides of the building's exterior, two sets of diagonal white lights on the foyer walls, and a large work in the main interior space featuring pink, yellow, green, blue, and ultraviolet lights. Also on display in Richmond Hall are four examples of Flavin's "monuments" to V. Tatlin, created between 1964 and 1969.

De Menil died in Houston on December 31, 1997.
