= John de Menil =

Franco-American businessman (1904–1973)

- John de Menil with Andy Warhol, Montreal, 1968
- Born: Jean Marie Joseph Menu de Ménil; January 4, 1904; Paris, France
- Died: June 1, 1973 (aged 69); Houston, Texas, U.S.
- Spouse: Dominique Schlumberger (m. 1931)
- Children: 5 (including Christophe, George, and Philippa)

John de Ménil (January 4, 1904 – June 1, 1973) was a Franco-American businessman, philanthropist, and art patron. He was the founding president of the International Foundation for Art Research (IFAR) in New York. With his wife, Dominique de Menil, he established the Menil Collection, a free museum designed by Renzo Piano and built in 1986 to preserve and exhibit their world-class contemporary art collection.

== Life ==
De Ménil was born Baron Jean Marie Joseph Menu de Ménil in Paris. After emigrating to the United States during World War II, he began using the name 'John Menu de Ménil' which is an anglicized version of 'Jean Menu de Ménil'. Over time he stopped using the 'Menu' portion of his surname and began using shortened forms of the surname such as 'de Ménil' or 'Deménil'. John's children also usually spell their surname as 'de Ménil' (sometimes they use the form 'Deménil'). After becoming a U. S. citizen in 1962, de Ménil officially changed his first name from 'Jean' to 'John'.

De Ménil was a son of Baron Georges-Auguste-Emmanuel Menu de Ménil (April 20, 1863 – 1947) and Marie-Madeleine Rougier (1866 – 1929). The Menu de Ménil family was a French Catholic family, many of whose men had been officers in the French military. The title of Baron, which de Ménil inherited from his father, had been bestowed on John's great-great-grandfather Paul-Alexis-Joseph Menu de Ménil (July 17, 1764 – December 30, 1834) on September 11, 1813 by Napoleon Bonaparte – thus making him a 'baron de l'Empire'.

In the 1920s de Ménil earned a degree in political science from Sciences Po (Institut d'Etudes Politiques de Paris) and a degree in law from the Faculté de droit de l'Université de Paris.

In 1930, de Ménil met French heiress Dominique Schlumberger, whom he married on May 9, 1931. They had five children. Although the full surname of these children actually is 'Menu de Ménil', in practice they all use the shortened anglicized spelling 'de Ménil' (or sometimes 'Deménil') instead, so that is what is given here:

- Christophe (Marie Christophe de Ménil) (1933-2025) – The first wife of Buddhist scholar Robert Thurman (they married in 1960), and the grandmother of artist Dash Snow.
- Adelaide (Louise Adélaïde de Ménil) (born 1935) – A photographer who was the third wife of anthropologist Edmund Snow Carpenter.
- Georges (Georges François Conrad de Ménil) (aka George de Menil) (born December 4, 1940) – An economist who is married to historian Lois Ames Pattison (born May 15, 1938). Georges and Lois were married on August 3, 1968.
- François (François Conrad Thomas de Ménil) (born April 12, 1945) – A filmmaker and architect. He married Susan Kadin Silver (born May 8, 1958) on January 18, 1985 in Harris County, Texas.
- Philippa (Anne Caroline Philippa de Ménil) (born June 13, 1947) – A co-founder of the Dia Art Foundation. Her first husband (whom she married on May 14, 1969, in Harris County, Texas) was Italian anthropologist Francesco Pellizzi (born July 14, 1940). Her second husband (whom she married in 1978) was visionary German art dealer Heiner Friedrich (born April 14, 1938).

In the early years of his marriage de Ménil was a banker, serving as vice-president (1932–1938) of the Banque Nationale pour le Commerce et l'Industrie in Paris. Following the outbreak of World War II and the Nazi occupation of France, the de Ménils emigrated from Paris to the United States. They maintained residences in New York City and France but settled in Houston, Texas, where de Ménil would eventually become president of Schlumberger Overseas (Middle and Far East) and Schlumberger Surenco (Latin America), two branches of the Houston-based oilfield services corporation.

== Building an art collection ==
John and Dominique de Ménil began collecting art intensively in the 1940s, beginning with a purchase of Paul Cézanne's 1895 painting Montagne (Mountain) in 1945. The de Ménils' Catholic faith, especially their interest in Father Yves Marie Joseph Congar's teachings on ecumenism, would become crucial in the development of their collecting ethos in the coming decades. With the guidance of the Dominican priest Marie-Alain Couturier, who introduced the de Ménils to the work of artists in galleries and museums in New York, they became interested in the intersection of modern art and spirituality. They ultimately amassed more than 17,000 paintings, sculptures, decorative objects, prints, drawings, photographs, and rare books.

The de Ménils were particularly interested in modern European art, and a core strength of the collection was the many Cubist, Surrealist, and other Modernist works they acquired. By the 1960s the de Menils had gravitated toward the major American post-war movements of Abstract expressionism, Pop art, and Minimalism. Over the years the family enjoyed close personal friendships with many of the artists whose work they collected, including Victor Brauner, Max Ernst, Jasper Johns, Yves Klein, René Magritte, Robert Rauschenberg, Dorothea Tanning, and Andy Warhol.

The de Ménils, however, did not limit their acquisitions to modern art, and their eclectic tastes became a hallmark of their collecting practices. As modernists, they recognized the profound formal and spiritual connections between contemporary works of art and the arts of ancient and indigenous cultures, broadening their collection to include works from classical Mediterranean and Byzantine cultures, as well as objects from Africa, Oceania, and the Pacific Northwest. Influenced by the teachings of Father Couturier and Father Congar, the de Menils developed a particular humanist ethos in which they understood art as a central part of the human experience. Their collection was motivated by their shared interest in the many ways individuals over different cultures and eras reveal through art their understanding of what it means to be human.

Plans to create a museum to house and exhibit the collection began as early as 1972, when the de Menils asked the architect Louis I. Kahn to design a museum campus on Menil Foundation property in the Montrose neighborhood of Houston near the Rothko Chapel. Kahn did produce some preliminary drawings, but the project was suspended in 1973 after de Menil's and Kahn's deaths less than a year apart. The de Menils' vision was finally realized in 1987 with the opening of the Menil Collection, designed by renowned Italian architect Renzo Piano.

== Patron of the arts ==
After moving to Houston, the de Menils quickly became key figures in the city's developing cultural life as advocates of modern art and architecture, recognizing that the city lacked a substantial arts community. Responding to a friend's observation that Houston was a cultural desert, de Menil is said to have quipped, "It's in the desert that miracles happen." During his lifetime he was a member of the board of directors or a trustee of the Amon Carter Museum, the American Federation of Arts Committee, the Contemporary Arts Museum Houston, the Institute of International Education, the Museum of Fine Arts, Houston, and the Museum of Primitive Art. He also served on the International Council and board of trustees of the Museum of Modern Art in New York.

In 1949 John and Dominique de Menil commissioned the architect Philip Johnson to design their home in the River Oaks neighborhood in Houston. One of the first International style residences in Texas, it generated controversy not only by standing out amongst the mansions of River Oaks but also by pairing Johnson's clean, modernist lines with a bold color palette and eclectic interior design by Charles James. The de Menils filled their home with art and hosted many of the leading artists, scientists, civil rights activists, and intellectuals of the day.

In the 1950s and 1960s, the de Menils promoted modern art in Houston through exhibitions held at the Contemporary Arts Association (later the Contemporary Arts Museum Houston), such as Max Ernst's first solo exhibition in the United States, and the Museum of Fine Arts, Houston, to which they gave important gifts of art. They were instrumental in the Contemporary Arts Association's decision to hire Jermayne MacAgy as its director, who curated several groundbreaking exhibitions, including "The Sphere of Mondrian" and "Totems Not Taboo: An Exhibition of Primitive Art." In 1954 they founded the Menil Foundation, a non-profit organization dedicated to the "support and advancement of religious, charitable, literary, scientific and educational purposes."

That same year they provided the University of St. Thomas, a small Catholic institution in Houston, with funding to build Strake Hall and Jones Hall, designed by Philip Johnson per their recommendation. In an effort to provide a strong art history curriculum in Houston for students and adults, they founded the Art Department at the University of St. Thomas in 1959, inviting Jermayne MacAgy to teach courses and curate exhibitions held at Jones Hall. They established the university's Media Center in 1967. The de Menils often personally recruited faculty members for the departments and brought many renowned artists and art historians to Houston, including Marcel Duchamp, Roberto Matta, and James Johnson Sweeney, whom they convinced to serve as museum director for the Museum of Fine Arts, Houston from 1961 to 1967.

In 1969 the de Menils moved the Art Department—including the art history faculty—and Media Center to Rice University, where they founded the Institute for the Arts to manage the exhibition program at Rice Museum. Notable exhibitions at Rice Museum organized with the help of the de Menils were "The Machine as Seen at the End of the Mechanical Age," curated by Pontus Hulten for the Museum of Modern Art, New York, and "Raid the Icebox 1 with Andy Warhol," an exhibition of objects selected by Warhol from the storage vaults of the Museum of Art at Rhode Island School of Design. At Rice John and Dominique de Menil also cultivated their interest in film; John de Menil was particularly interested in film as a tool for political and social activism in developing nations. They worked with such noted filmmakers as Roberto Rossellini, who made several trips to Houston to teach Rice University students and create television documentaries. Other filmmakers who visited the Media Center included Ola Balogun, Bernardo Bertolucci, James Blue, Jim McBride, and Colin Young.

John and Dominique de Menil also shared an interest in photography, inviting photographers to come to Houston to document events in the city and exhibit their work. They commissioned Henri Cartier-Bresson to photograph the 1957 American Federation of Arts convention, held in Houston that year, and worked with photographers such as Frederick Baldwin and Wendy Watriss, who went on to establish FotoFest, and Geoff Winningham, who served as head of the Photography Department at Rice Media Center. Photography became an important component of the collection, which includes works by Eve Arnold, Henri Cartier-Bresson, Danny Lyon, Hans Namuth, and Eve Sonneman.

== Civil rights ==
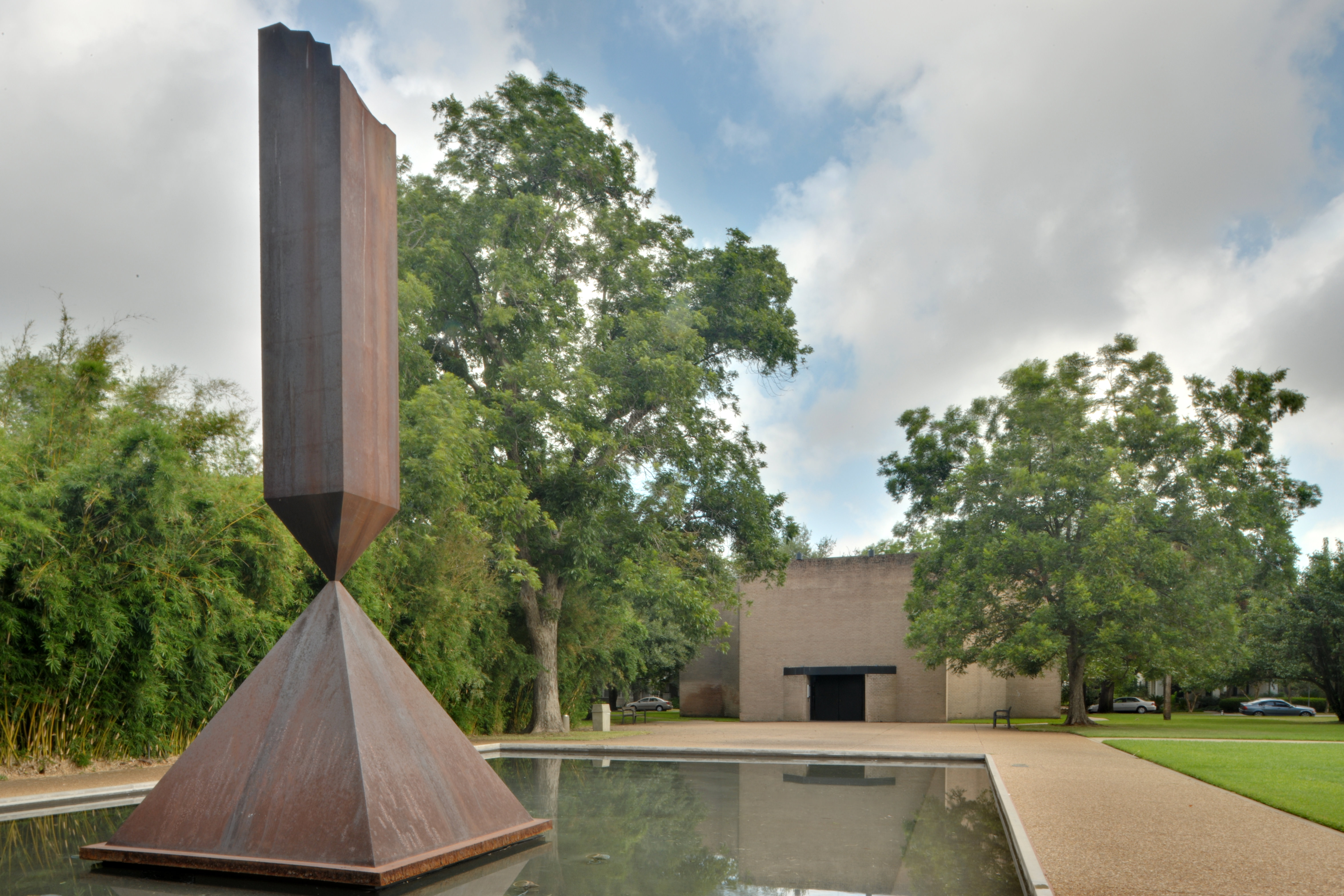
Barnett Newman's Broken Obelisk in front of the Rothko Chapel, Houston

In addition to becoming known as collectors and patrons of art, John and Dominique de Menil were vocal champions of human rights worldwide. Their actions in Houston focused on the Civil Rights Movement in particular. In 1960 they launched the ambitious scholarly research project "The Image of the Black in Western Art," directed by art historian Ladislas Bugner. An ongoing project that seeks to catalogue and study the depiction of individuals of African descent in Western art, it is now under the aegis of Harvard University. De Menil also provided funding for Houston non-profit organizations such as SHAPE (Self-Help for African People Through Education).

The de Menils also organized exhibitions that promoted human and civil rights, including The De Luxe Show, a 1971 exhibition of contemporary art held in Houston's Fifth Ward, a historically African-American neighborhood. Coordinated by civil rights activist and later U.S. Congressman Mickey Leland, it was one of the first racially-integrated art shows in the United States.

Their most controversial action on behalf of civil rights was their offer of Barnett Newman's Broken Obelisk as a partial gift to the city of Houston in 1969, on the condition that it be dedicated to the recently assassinated Dr. Martin Luther King Jr. The city refused the gift, sparking a controversial debate that involved de Menil proposing that the sculpture be inscribed with the Biblical quote "Forgive them for they know not what they do." Ultimately the de Menils purchased the sculpture themselves and decided to place it in front of the newly completed Rothko Chapel.

The de Menils had originally made plans to build the Rothko Chapel in 1964 when Mark Rothko was commissioned to produce a suite of meditative paintings for a chapel intended as a space of dialogue and reflection between faiths. After undergoing revisions by several architects, including Philip Johnson, Howard Barnstone, and Eugene Aubry, the non-denominational Rothko Chapel was dedicated on Menil Foundation property in 1971 in a ceremony that included members of various religions. It was established as an autonomous organization the next year and began hosting colloquia, beginning with "Traditional Modes of Contemplation and Action," which brought together religious leaders, scholars, and musicians from four continents. It continues to host events focusing on inter-faith dialogue and human rights.

== See also ==
- Dominique de Menil
- The Menil Collection
- The Rothko Chapel
- International Foundation for Art Research
