= Christophe de Menil =

American heiress and designer (1933–2025)

- Born: Marie-Christophe de Menil; February 5, 1933; Paris, France
- Died: August 5, 2025 (aged 92); New York City, U.S.
- Education: Columbia University
- Occupations: Heiress; debutante; costume designer; philanthropist
- Years active: 1952–2000s
- Spouses: Robert Thurman (m. 1960; div. 1961) Enrique Castro-Cid (m. 1971; div. 1974)
- Children: 1
- Parents: John de Menil; Dominique de Menil
- Relatives: Philippa de Menil (sister); Georges de Menil (brother); Dash Snow (grandson)

Marie-Christophe de Menil (February 5, 1933 – August 5, 2025) was an American heiress, debutante, costume designer and philanthropist. An heiress to the Schlumberger fortune, de Menil also followed in her parents' footsteps to become an art collector. Additionally, for two decades, she was the costume designer for the theater director Robert Wilson. De Menil promoted numerous artists, architects, and designers, including John Cage, Frank Gehry, Willem de Kooning, and Twyla Tharp.

== Biography ==
=== Early life ===
Marie-Christophe de Menil was born to an upper class family in Paris, France, on February 5, 1933. Her father, John de Menil, a banker who later made a fortune in the oil industry, came from a titled but relatively poor family and her mother, Dominique de Menil who would become a philanthropist and art collector, with the pair meeting at a ball. Both of her parents were also significant patrons of the arts in their own rights. She was the eldest of five, having younger sisters Adelaide and Philippa and younger brothers Georges and Francois. Her mother was the heiress to a massive fortune of Conrad Schlumberger and Marcel Schlumberger.

At the outbreak of World War II, de Menil, her mother, and her siblings, fled to Marseille, as their father was in Romania at the time of the declaration of war. The family eventually made their way to Bilbao, Spain, and traveled to Havana, Cuba, where they were reunited with their father before ultimately settling in Houston, Texas.

=== American socialite ===
The de Menils lived an opulent life in Houston, and maintained a second residence in New York City. Each of the five children inherited a sizable portion of the Schlumberger fortune. Marie-Christophe made her debut in 1952 wearing a 15-pound gown designed by Charles James. In 1960, at the age of 26 she married Robert Thurman, eight years her junior. The pair would separate in 1961 when Thurman dropped out of Harvard and traveled through Iran and India "soul searching", eventually becoming a Buddhist monk and one of the leading western Buddhist authors, but leaving de Menil alone with their infant daughter Taya.

In 1969, at the age of 33, de Menil enrolled in Columbia University to study religion; however, most of her time in college saw her hosting extravagant parties for fellow ultra-rich students in the Hamptons. At these parties she established connections with Robert Whitman, La Monte Young, and Hans Namuth and also started collecting art and even worked on Namuth's documentary on Willem de Kooning whose work she frequently collected. The New York Times in a 1986 article, described her as having "a long history of supporting difficult art projects". In 1971, she married Chilean artist Enrique Castro-Cid, but they divorced in 1974.

In 1976, de Menil moved to the East End and commissioned Frank Gehry to design a massive two-building mansion, with one building for her, and another for her teenage daughter. To finance her new mansion she sold $2 million worth of major paintings at Sotheby's auctions. She sold the property to art dealer Larry Gagosian in 1987 and moved to an apartment on Park Avenue.

=== Costume designer ===
In 1980, de Menil was discovered by Robert Wilson as a costume designer, working with Wilson for two decades. In 1981, she debuted her first fashion collection, XS, as a play on "excess". By 1984, she was one of the leading forces in New York's fashion scenes, being friends with Marie-Hélène de Rothschild and Bianca Jagger.

== Later life and death ==
In 2009, her grandson Dash Snow died of a drug overdose at the age of 27.

In December 2014, de Menil auctioned off a number of objects she had acquired over the years through the online auction house Paddle8. Items auctioned included jewelry she designed, attenuated chairs from the 1976 production of Einstein on the Beach, a drawing by Doug Wheeler, and a rare two-part sofa by Charles James.

In 2021, her nurse Alina Morini claimed that de Menil's daughter, Taya, "forced" her mother to live in isolation and attempted to have Morini "falsely arrested" for trespassing when she attempted to nurse de Menil.

De Menil died at home in Manhattan on August 5, 2025, at the age of 92, bedridden from arthritis.
