= The Overture to Tannhäuser =

Painting by Paul Cézanne

- Jeune fille au piano—Ouverture du Tannhäuser (French)
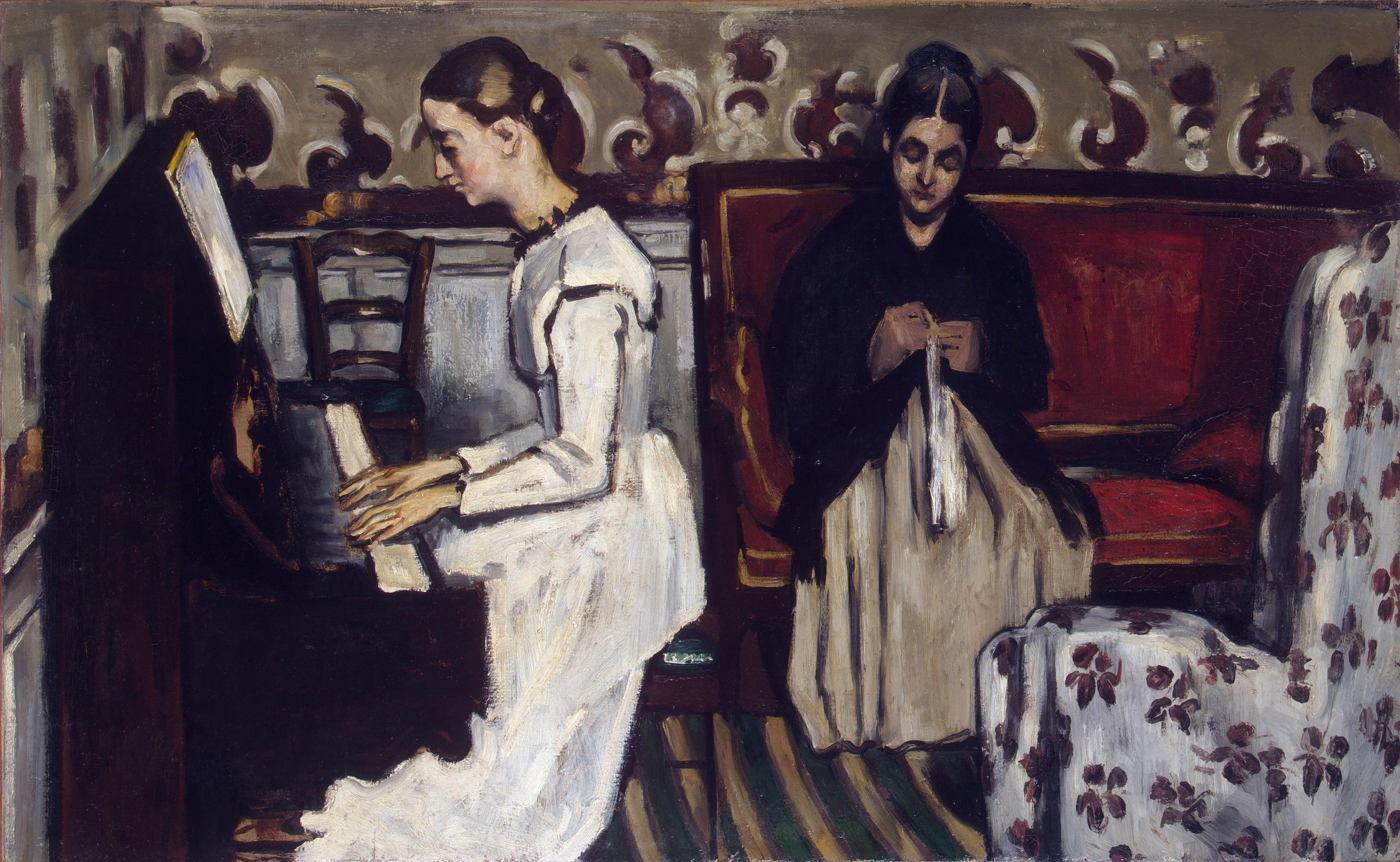
- Artist: Paul Cézanne
- Year: 1869–70
- Catalogue: V 90; R 149; FWN 600
- Medium: Oil on canvas
- Dimensions: 57 cm × 92 cm (22 in × 36 in)
- Location: Hermitage Museum, St. Petersburg

The Overture to Tannhäuser, also known as Young Girl at the Piano, is an oil-on-canvas painting by the French Post-Impressionist artist Paul Cézanne, from 1869-1870. It is held in the Hermitage Museum, in Saint Petersburg. It came from the Moscow collection of Ivan Morozov.

== History and description ==
The painting shows two women, usually identified as Cézanne's sister and mother, but possibly the daughters of his uncle Dominique Aubert, at the Cézanne family home near Aix-en-Provence. Its title refers to the work played by the pianist on the left, the overture to Wagner's Tannhäuser.

The painting depicts a young girl, Cézanne’s sister, at the piano, while her mother, also the painter’s mother sits on an Empire-style red sofa, engaged in embroidery. The scene takes place in a living room at the Jas de Bouffan—a family estate near Aix, that the painter’s father had purchased about a decade earlier. With this work, the painter sought to pay homage to Richard Wagner, whom he deeply admired; the young girl is likely playing a piano variation from that opera. Wagner’s Tannhäuser had been performed in Paris for the first time in 1861.

The painting captures an intimate scene while simultaneously offering an exploration of the color white. Vertical white elements—the open sheet music, the young girl's dress, the piano keyboard, and the back of the armchair—contrast with the white, brown-accented flourishes found on the drapery and the armchair. The composition is complex, combining straight lines with broken lines.

== See also ==
- List of paintings by Paul Cézanne
