= IFAR =

IFAR may refer to one of the following

- Ifar Gunung in Papua
- International Fanconi Anemia Registry
- International Forum for Aviation Research
- International Foundation for Art Research
- In-Flight Aspect Ratio in Fusion Science Research
