= Frederick Baldwin =

Frederick Baldwin may refer to:

- Frederick Walker Baldwin (1882–1948), Canadian hydrofoil and aviation pioneer and partner of the inventor Alexander Graham Bell
- Frederick W. Baldwin (Vermont politician) (1848–1923), Vermont attorney, businessman, historian, author and politician
- Frederick C. Baldwin (1929–2021), American photographer
