= Diego Angulo Íñiguez =

Diego Angulo Iñiguez (July 18, 1901 – October 5, 1986) was an art historian, a university professor, writer and Director of the Prado Museum in Madrid from 1968 to 1970.

Complementing his career as a curator an academic, he served as one of the founding members of the Art advisory council of the International Foundation for Art Research (IFAR).

In 1949 he became the director of the journal Archivo Español del Arte, a position he held until his retirement in 1972. From 1953, he also carried out interesting research and research promotion work in Madrid as director of the Diego Velázquez Institute of the Higher Council for Scientific Research. In 1954 he joined the Royal Academy of Fine Arts of San Fernando.

After nearly 30 years as a member of the Prado Museum's Board of Trustees, he became its new director on August 15, 1968. However, political pressure forced him to resign in 1971.

Angulo Íñiguez died in Seville in 1986.

== Select works ==
In a statistical overview derived from writings by and about Diego Angulo Iñiguez, OCLC/WorldCat encompasses roughly 300+ works in 600+5 publications in 7 languages and 3,400+ library holdings.

- Historia del arte hispano-americano (1945)
- Historia del arte (1953)
- Pintura del renacimiento (1954)
- Juan de Borgoña by Juan de Borgoña (1954)
- José Antolínez (1957)
- Historia de la pintura española (1969)
- Retablo barroco : a la memoria de Francisco de la Maza (1974)
- A corpus of Spanish drawings (1975)
- Spanish drawings, 1400–1600 (1975)
- Murillo (1981)
