= Richland Library =

Library system of Richland County, South Carolina

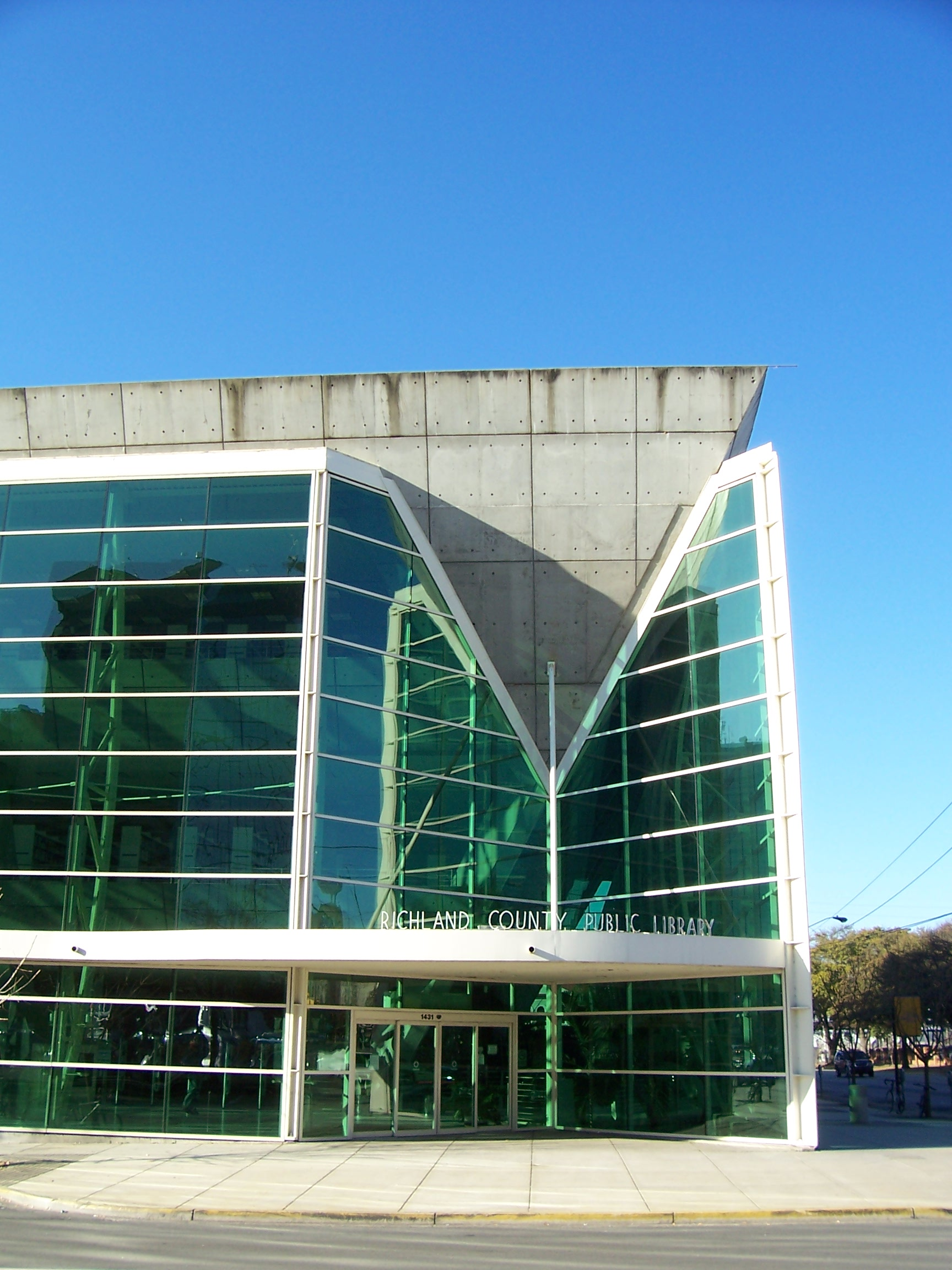
- Main Library
- 34°0′15″N 81°2′15″W
- Location: Richland County, South Carolina
- Type: Public library
- Established: 1924; 102 years ago
- Branches: 13

Collection
- Size: 1.2M

Access and use
- Circulation: 3.3M
- Population served: 364,000
- Members: ~200,000

Other information
- Budget: $26M
- Director: Tamara King
- Website: Richland Library

Richland Library is the public library system of Richland County, South Carolina. In December 2012, the library shortened its name from Richland County Public Library. It has 13 branches including its 242,000 sq ft (22,500 m^{2}) Main Library. In 2001, it was named the National Library of the Year by the Library Journal and the Gale Group.

== History ==
The library began as a private charity in 1896. In 1924, the City of Columbia took over the operation and financing of the library, and the Columbia Public Library was born. Having been housed in a number of storefront locations, in 1929 the library moved into the former home of Dr. James Woodrow, the uncle of President Woodrow Wilson. The library added a bookmobile, and a Phillis Wheatley branch in the African-American neighborhood of Waverly in 1930. In 1933 Richland County began financing the library, and in 1934 the South Carolina General Assembly approved the takeover, so the name was changed to Richland County Public Library. The library was granted nonprofit status in 1982.

In 1986, the RCPL, together with the University of South Carolina, began an annual event, "A(ugusta) Baker's Dozen: A Celebration of Stories" in honor of Augusta Braxton Baker, a pioneering children's librarian originally with the New York Public Library.

Over the decades the library added branches, and by 1989 had outgrown its 32,000 sq ft (3,000 m^{2}) main branch. On February 14 of that year, that voters of Richland County approved a $27 million bond referendum. Exactly four years later the new Main Library opened at 1431 Assembly Street. The project had been shepherded by C. David Warren, library director since 1979. The remainder of the bond proceeds were used for other improvements, including the addition of seven new branch buildings. In 2001, the Library Journal and the Gale Group named Richland County Public Library the National Library of the Year.

== Main Library ==
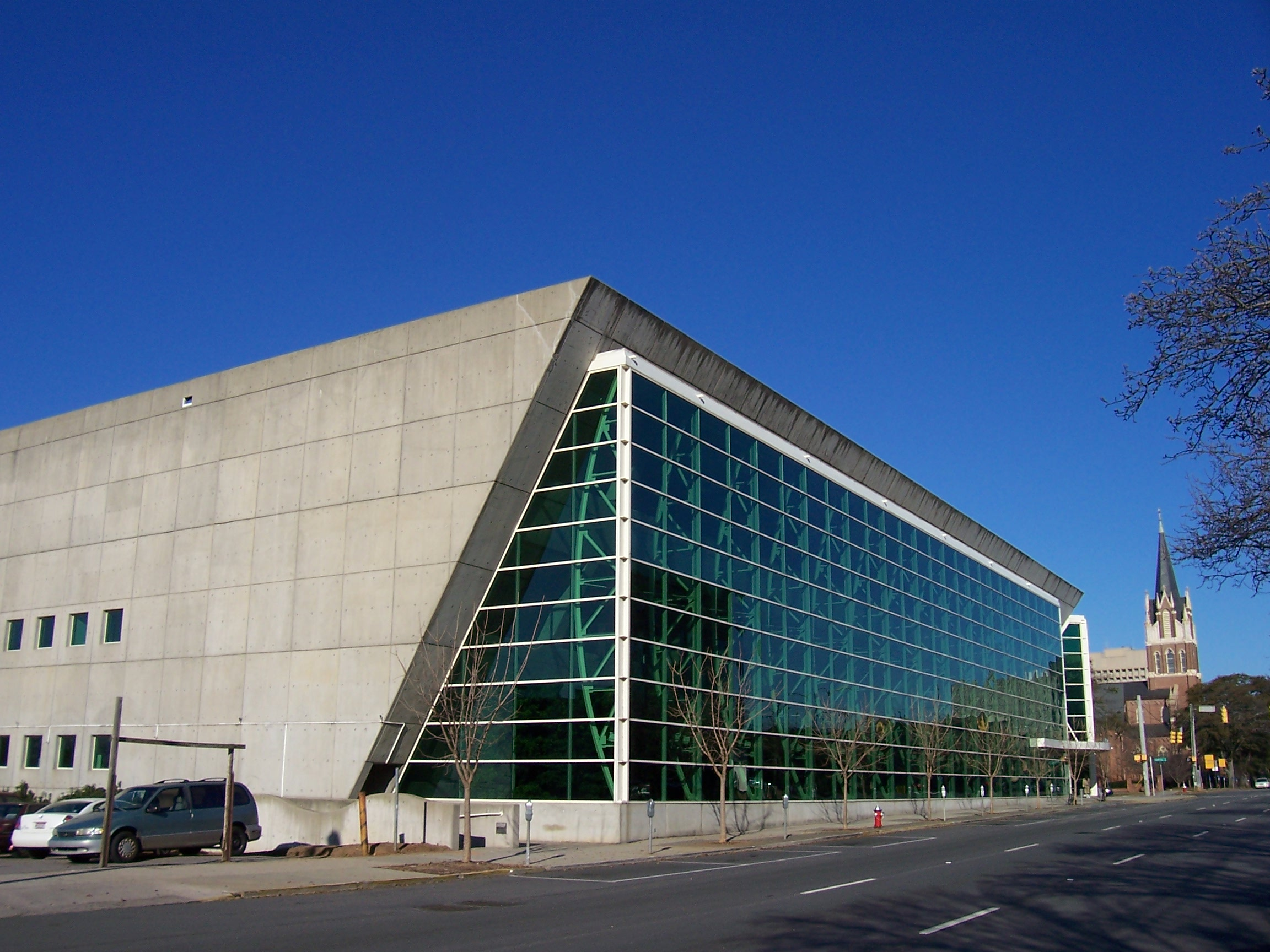
Main Library facade

Costing $11.6 million, the four story, 242,000 square feet (22,500 m^{2}) Main Library, designed by architect Eugene Aubry, was the chief reason for the bond issue. Aside from the striking exterior, the Children's Room, which is located in the building's basement, has a mural of characters from Maurice Sendak's Where the Wild Things Are. This is the only place in the world where Sendak approved such use of his work.
