= Enrique Castro-Cid =

Chilean-American robotics artist

- Enrique in the 1960s
- Born: 1937; Chile
- Died: 1992 (aged 55); Miami
- Education: Universadad de Chile; New School
- Occupation: Artist
- Years active: 1960s-1980s
- Spouse: Christophe de Menil (m. 1971; div. 1974)

Enrique Castro-Cid was a Chilean-American pop-artist known for his work in the medium of robots and automatons.

== Biography ==
Enrique Castro-Cid was born in 1937 in Chile. His parents attempted to encourage a career as a lawyer, but he quickly pivoted to an art career once in college.

Castro-Cid studied at the Universadad de Chile and worked there as an assistant professor, however, noted that it was difficult to make ends meet in that position, as such he accepted a grant from the Organization of American States in 1961 to study in the United States at the New School in New York City.

== Art career ==
Castro-Cid was awarded two Guggenheim Foundation Fellowships in 1964 and won the William Copley award in 1966.

Castro-Cid maintained several solo exhibitions in New York at Richard L. Feigen & Co. and the Dia Center for the Arts with his works being included in the collections of the Lowe Art Museum, Guggenheim Museum, Museum of Modern Art and Yale University's Latin American Art Since Independence collection.

His art, which largely consisted of plexiglass, wood, and plastic robots, as well as several oil paintings, where positively received by parents and art critics alike both for making art approachable for children, as well as the more mature themes.

Castro-Cid's main inspiration for using robotics as a medium was due to how he felt society is preoccupied with "Faustian" evils, showing a bleak future where unfeeling, dominant machines enslave their human creators.

Castro-Cid was named as a fellowship juror for the Guggenheim Foundation before being appointed the University of Illinois' "visiting artist" in 1968.

A pioneer in computer-aided design (CAD), Castro-Cid also worked in the film industry, designing the robot hound in the Fahrenheit 451 film in 1966. He also used CAD for a number of his later paintings when he moved to Miami in the 1980s.

== Personal life ==
Castro-Cid was described as a "cheerful advocate" for "Dionysian society" believing that labor is not a moral ideal, and that society should be structured around leisure. Castro-Cid was briefly married to Christophe de Menil for three years from 1971 to 1974. After his divorce he moved to Miami in the 1980s. Castro-Cid died in 1992 at the age of 55.
