= Robert Thurman =

American Buddhist philosopher and writer (1941–2026)

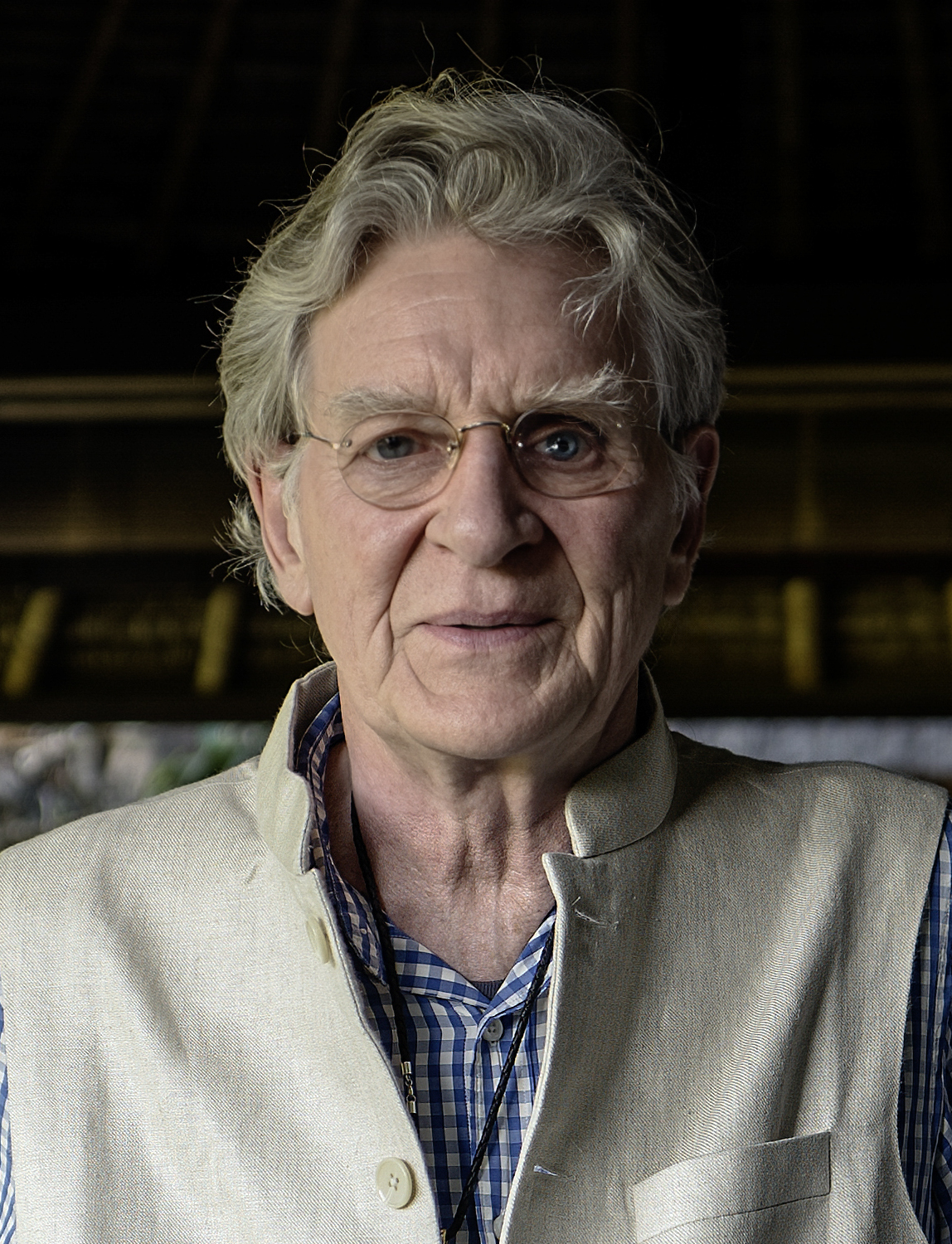
- Thurman in 2016
- Born: Robert Alexander Farrar Thurman; August 3, 1941; New York City, U.S.
- Died: June 16, 2026 (aged 84); Woodstock, New York, U.S.
- Other names: Bob Thurman, Alexander Thurman, Alecsander Thermen
- Education: Harvard University (BA, MA, PhD)
- Spouses: Marie-Christophe de Menil (m. 1960; div. 1961); Nena von Schlebrügge (m. 1967)
- Children: 5, including Uma
- Relatives: Dash Snow, Maya Hawke, Levon Hawke (grandchildren)
- Scientific career
- Fields: Indo-Tibetan Buddhist studies
- Workplaces: Amherst College; Columbia University
- Doctoral advisor: Daniel H. H. Ingalls Sr.
- Doctoral students: Christian K. Wedemeyer

Robert Alexander Farrar Thurman (August 3, 1941 – June 16, 2026) was an American Buddhist philosopher and writer, best known for his work in Tibetan Buddhism. He was the Je Tsongkhapa Professor of Indo-Tibetan Buddhist Studies at Columbia University, before retiring in 2019. He held the first endowed chair in Buddhist Studies in the West. He was the co-founder and president of Tibet House US, New York, and its Menla Retreat & Dewa Spa in Phoenicia, New York. He translated the Vimalakirti Sutra from the Tibetan Kangyur into English. He was the father of actress Uma Thurman, and grandfather of Maya Hawke.

== Biography ==
=== Early life and education ===
Robert Alexander Farrar Thurman was born in Manhattan, New York City, the son of Elizabeth Dean Farrar (1907–1973), a stage actress, and Beverly Reid Thurman Jr. (1909–1962), an Associated Press editor and U.N. translator (French and English). He was of English, German, Scottish, and Scots-Irish/Northern Irish descent.

Thurman attended Phillips Exeter Academy from 1954 to 1958 but was expelled weeks from graduation after leaving without permission to join Fidel Castro and his guerrilla army in Cuba. He was stopped in Florida and worked for a brief time in Mexico. In 1960, he married Marie-Christophe de Menil before going to Harvard University, where he obtained his B.A. in 1962. He later returned to Harvard for graduate study in Sanskrit, receiving an M.A. in 1969 and a Ph.D. in 1972.

=== Career ===
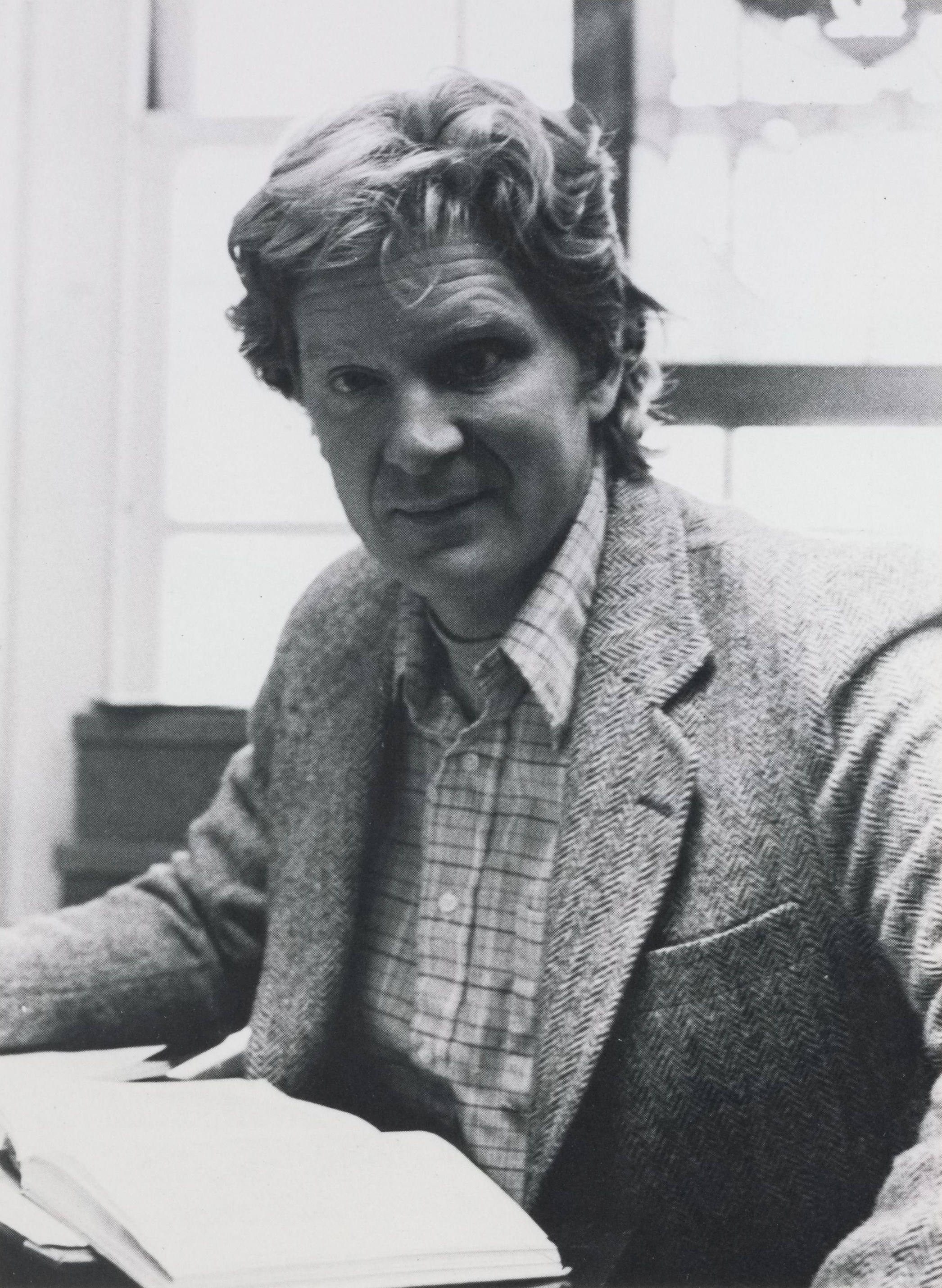
Thurman in the Amherst College yearbook, 1981

In 1961, Thurman lost his left eye in an accident "involving a racecar and a car jack", and the eye was replaced with a glass eye. After the accident, Thurman said, he decided to refocus his life, divorcing de Menil and traveling from 1961 to 1966 in Turkey, Iran, and India. In India he taught English to exiled tulkus (Tibetan lamas) in Dalhousie where the Young Lamas Home School was transferred.

After his father's death in 1962, Thurman came back to the United States and in New Jersey met Geshe Wangyal, a Kalmyk Buddhist monk from Mongolia who became his first guru. Thurman became a Buddhist and went back to India where, due to Wangyal's introduction, Thurman studied with Tenzin Gyatso, the 14th Dalai Lama. Thurman was ordained by the Dalai Lama in 1965, the first American Buddhist monk of the Tibetan Buddhist tradition, and the two became close friends. In 1967, Thurman returned to the United States.

Thurman then worked towards his Ph.D. in Sanskrit Indian Studies from Harvard, which he obtained in 1972. The same year, Thurman founded the American Institute of Buddhist Studies at Columbia. He went on to become professor of religion at Amherst College from 1973 to 1988, then the Jey Tsong Khapa Professor of Indo-Tibetan Buddhist Studies at Columbia University, retiring in 2020.

In 1986, at the request of the Dalai Lama, Thurman created Tibet House US along with his wife Nena, Richard Gere, and Philip Glass. Tibet House US is a nonprofit organization whose mission is to help preserve Tibetan Culture in exile. In 2001, the Pathwork Center, a 320-acre (1.3 km^{2}) retreat center on Panther Mountain in Phoenicia, New York, was donated to Tibet House US. Thurman and Nena von Schlebrügge renamed the center Menla Retreat and Dewa Spa. Menla (the Tibetan name for the Medicine Buddha) was developed into a state-of-the-art healing arts center grounded in the Tibetan Medical tradition in conjunction with other holistic paradigms.

In November 2025, Thurman gave a talk organized by the Office of Tibet, London, and Enacting Peace in the Parliament of the United Kingdom, hosted by Chris Law, Chair of the All-Party Parliamentary Group for Tibet to celebrate the Dalai Lama's 90th birthday.

=== Personal life ===
On June 7, 1960, he married Marie-Christophe de Menil, daughter of Dominique de Menil and John de Menil and heiress to the Schlumberger Limited oil-equipment fortune. Their daughter Taya Thurman was born on March 5, 1961.

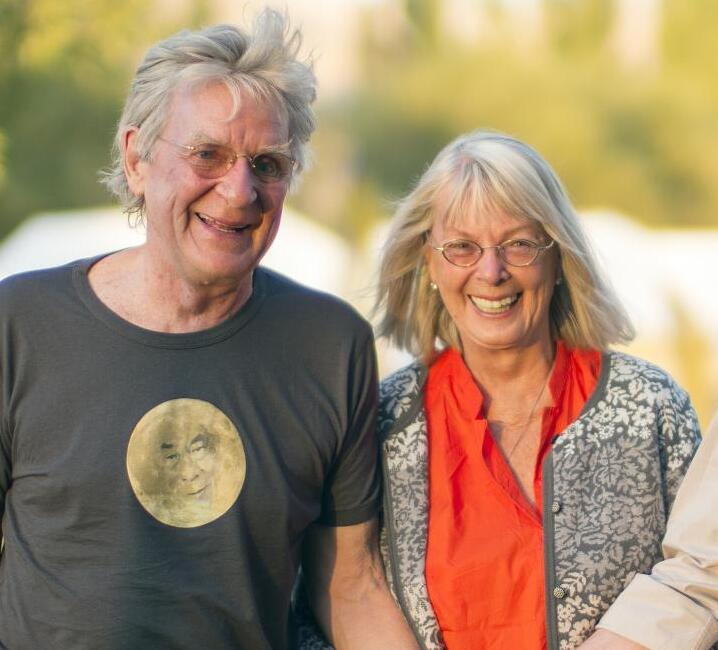
Thurman with his wife Nena von Schlebrügge in 2014

Thurman then met von Schlebrügge at her then-husband's Timothy Leary's home. Von Schlebrügge later divorced Leary, and subsequently married Thurman in 1967. Thurman had to renounce his monk status (which required celibacy) to marry von Schlebrügge. Robert and Nena Thurman had four children, including Ganden, who is executive director of Tibet House US, actress Uma Thurman, Dechen, and Mipam.

Thurman was the father of five children and grandfather to eight grandchildren. Through his daughter, Taya, his grandson was the artist Dash Snow. He also has a great-granddaughter through Snow. Through his daughter Uma and her husband Ethan Hawke, his grandchildren are actors Levon Hawke and Maya Hawke.

Robert and Nena's children grew up in Woodstock, New York, where the Thurmans had bought nine acres of land with a small inheritance Nena had received. The Thurmans built their own house there.

=== Death ===
Thurman died at his home in Woodstock, New York, on June 16, 2026, at the age of 84. Following his death, the Dalai Lama said: "Bob lived a meaningful life and has left behind a legacy that will continue to inspire future students of Tibetan Buddhism and culture for generations to come."

== Legacy ==
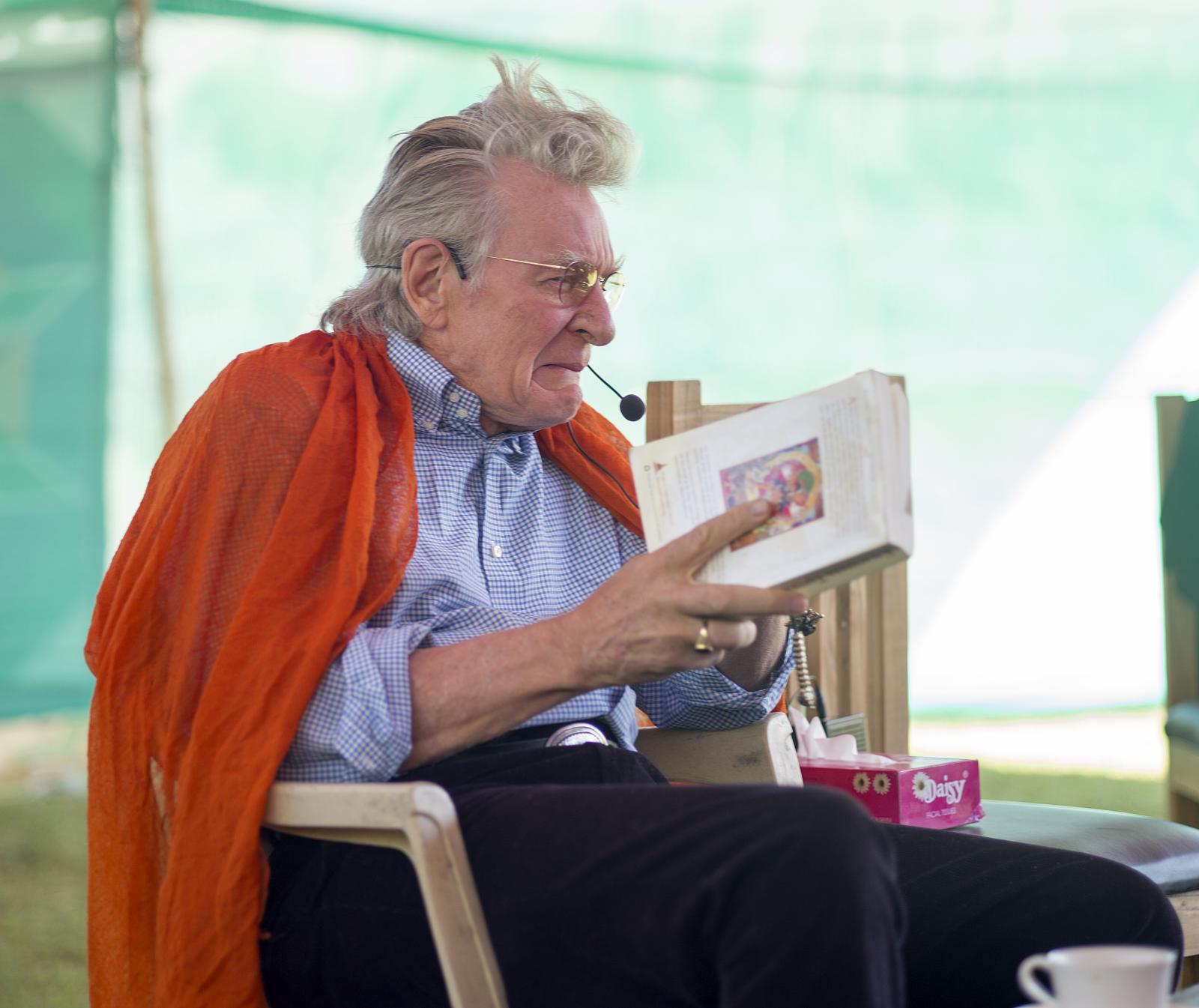
Thurman in 2014

In their obituary of Thurman, The New York Times called him the "leading interpreter of Tibetan Buddhism" with a reputation of being the Dalai Lama's "man in America". Thurman was noted for being the first Westerner Tibetan Buddhist monk ordained by the Dalai Lama. Rolling Stone credited Thurman for his mission of preserving Tibetan culture through his Tibet House institution.

Thurman was considered to have been a pioneering, creative, and talented translator of Buddhist literature by many of his English-speaking peers. Speaking of Thurman's translation of Tsongkhapa's Essence of Eloquence (Legs bshad snying po), Matthew Kapstein, professor at the University of Chicago and Ecole Pratique des Hautes Etudes in Paris, wrote that "the Essence of Eloquence is famed in learned Tibetan circles as a text of unparalleled difficulty. ... To have translated it into English at all must be reckoned an intellectual accomplishment of a very high order. To have translated it to all intents and purposes correctly is a staggering achievement." Similarly, prominent Buddhologist Jan Nattier has praised the style of Thurman's translation of the Vimalakīrti Sūtra, praising it as among the very best of translations of that important Indian Buddhist scripture.

== Awards and honors ==
Time named Thurman one of the 25 most influential Americans of 1997. In 2003 he received the Light of Truth Award, a human rights award from the International Campaign for Tibet. New York Magazine named him as one of the "Influentials" in religion in 2006. In 2020 he was a recipient of India's prestigious Padma Shri Award for literature and education.

== Works ==
- The Central Philosophy of Tibet: A Study and Translation of Jey Tsong Khapa's Essence of True Eloquence, Princeton University Press, 1991 ISBN 978-0-691-02067-9
- The Tibetan Book of the Dead: The Natural Liberation Through Understanding in the Between Bantam Doubleday Dell, 1994 (translations in Spanish, French, German, Italian, Korean, Japanese, Chinese, Russian) ISBN 978-0-553-37090-4
- Essential Tibetan Buddhism, Castle Books, 1995 ISBN 978-0-06-251051-8
- Wisdom and Compassion: The Sacred Art of Tibet, with Marilyn Rhie Abrams, 1996 ISBN 0-8109-3985-1
- Mandala: The Architecture of Enlightenment, with Denise P. Leidy, Shambhala Publications, 1997 ISBN 978-0-500-28018-8, ISBN 978-0-500-28018-8
- World of Transformation: Masterpieces of Tibetan Sacred Art in the Donald Rubin Collection, with Marilyn Rhie, Tibet House US/Abrams, 1999 ISBN 978-0-8109-6387-0
- Inner Revolution: Life, Liberty, and the Pursuit of Real Happiness, Penguin, 1999 ISBN 978-1-57322-719-3
- Circling the Sacred Mountain: A Spiritual Adventure Through the Himalayas with Tad Wise, Bantam Doubleday Dell, 1999 ISBN 978-0-553-10346-5
- The Holy Teaching of Vimalakirti: A Mahayana Scripture, Pennsylvania State University Press, 2000, ISBN 978-0-271-01209-4
- Infinite Life: Seven Virtues for Living Well, Riverhead Books, 2004, ISBN 978-1-59448-069-0
- The Universal Vehicle Discourse Literature (with Lozang Jamspal, et al.), Columbia University Press, 2005 ISBN 978-0-9753734-0-8
- The Jewel Tree of Tibet: The Enlightenment Engine of Tibetan Buddhism, Free Press/Simon & Schuster, 2005 ISBN 978-0-7432-5763-3
- Visions of Tibet: Outer, Inner, Secret, photographs by Brian Kistler, introduction by Robert Thurman, ed. Thomas Yarnell, Overlook Duckworth, 2005, ISBN 978-1-58567-741-2
- Anger: of the Seven Deadly Sins, Oxford University Press, 2005, ISBN 978-0-19-516975-1
- Life and Teachings of Tsongkhapa, Library of Tibetan Works and Archives, 2006, ISBN 978-81-86470-44-2
- Why the Dalai Lama Matters: His Act of Truth as the Solution for China, Tibet and the World, Atria Books/Beyond Words, 2008, ISBN 978-1-58270-220-9
- A Shrine for Tibet: The Alice Kandell Collection with Marylin Rhie, Overlook, 2010 ISBN 978-0-9670115-7-8, ISBN 978-1-59020-310-1
- Tsong Khapa's Extremely Brilliant Lamp, Robert Thurman, 2010, ISBN 978-1-935011-00-2
- Brilliant Illumination of the Lamp of the Five Stages, Columbia University Press, 2011, ISBN 978-1-935011-00-2
- Love Your Enemies: How To Break the Anger Habit & Be a Whole Lot Happier with Sharon Salzberg, Hay House, 2013 ISBN 978-1-4019-2814-8
- My Appeal to the World, 14th Dalai Lama, Sofia Stril-Rever, compiler, Robert Thurman, foreword, Tibet House US, Hay House, 2015, ISBN 978-0-9670115-6-1
- Man of Peace: The Illustrated Life Story of the Dalai Lama of Tibet, graphic novel, William Meyers, Robert Thurman, Michael G. Burbank, initiated artistically by Rabkar Wangchuk, art a team effort of five artists coordinated by Steve Buccellato and Michael Burbank, Tibet House US, ISBN 978-1-941312-03-2
