= Rothko Chapel =

- U.S. National Register of Historic Places
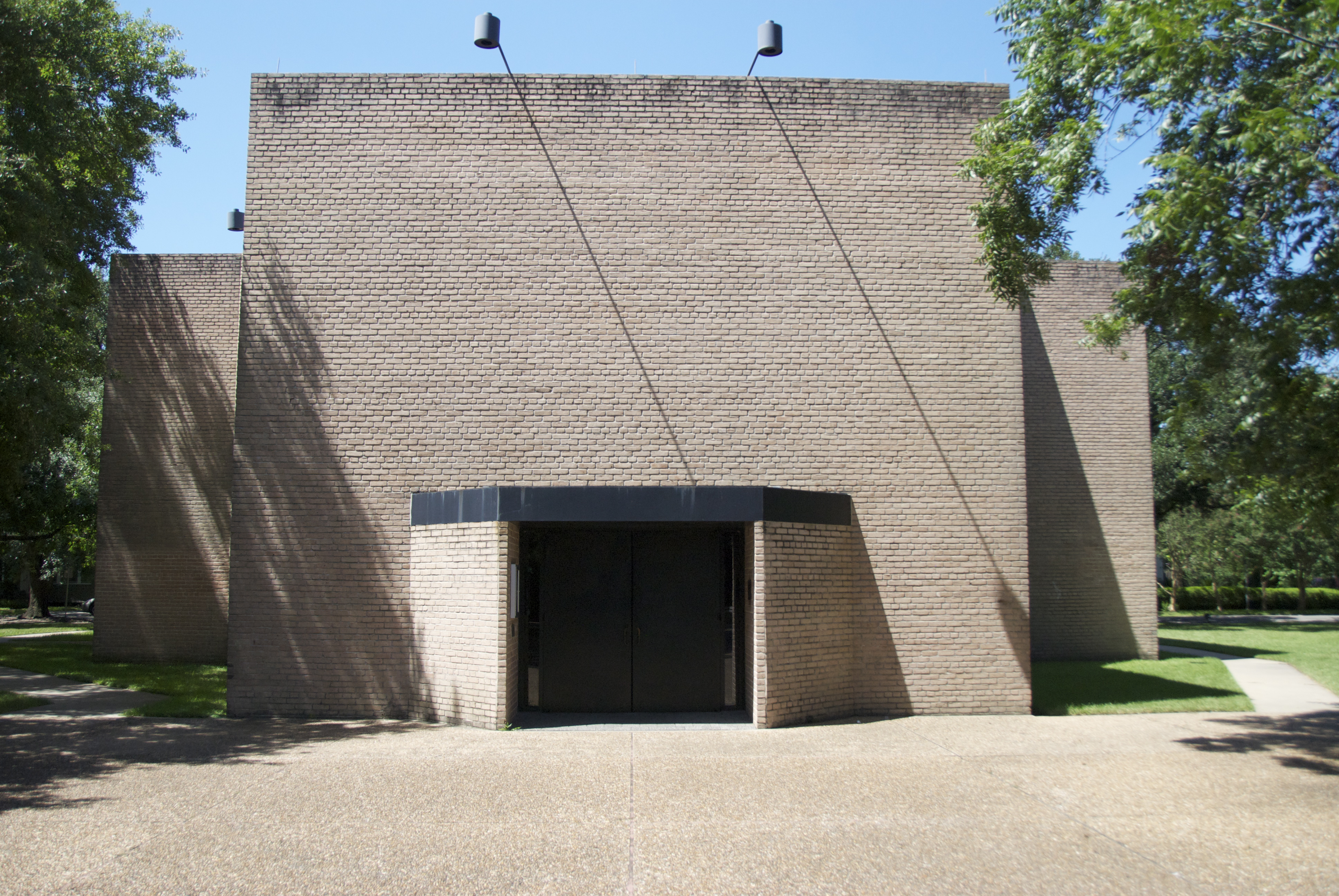

- Location within Texas Location within the United States
- Location: 3900 Yupon Street, Houston, Texas
- Coordinates: 29°44′15″N 95°23′46″W
- Area: less than 1 acre (4,000 m^{2})
- Built: 1971
- Architect: Rothko, Mark; Johnson, Philip, et al. Renovation (2020) by Architecture Research Office.
- Architectural style: Modern Movement, New Formalist
- NRHP reference No.: 00000883
- Added to NRHP: August 16, 2000

The Rothko Chapel is a non-denominational chapel in Houston, Texas, founded by John and Dominique de Menil. The interior serves not only as a chapel, but also serves as the display framework for a major work of modern art: on its walls are fourteen paintings by Mark Rothko in varying hues of black. The shape of the building—an octagon inscribed in a Greek cross—and the design of the chapel were largely influenced by the artist. The chapel sits 2 mi (3.2 km) southwest of downtown in the Montrose neighborhood, situated between the building housing the Menil Collection and the Chapel of Saint Basil on the campus of the University of Saint Thomas. About 110,000 people visit the chapel each year.

Susan J. Barnes states "The Rothko Chapel ... became the world's first broadly ecumenical center, a holy place open to all religions and belonging to none. It became a center for international cultural, religious, and philosophical exchanges, for colloquia and performances. And it became a place of private prayer for individuals of all faiths".

On September 16, 2000, the Rothko Chapel was placed on the National Register of Historic Places.

== History ==
In 1964 Rothko was commissioned by John and Dominique de Menil (also founders of the nearby Menil Collection) to create a meditative space filled with his paintings. The works are site-specific, one of the requirements of the program. As Rothko was given creative license on the design of the structure, he clashed with the project's original architect, Philip Johnson over the plans for the chapel. The plans went through several revisions and architects. Rothko continued to work first with Howard Barnstone and then with Eugene Aubry, but ultimately he did not live to see the chapel's completion in 1971. After a long struggle with depression, Rothko died by suicide in his New York studio on February 25, 1970.

From 1973 onward, the Rothko Chapel doubled as a center for colloquiums aimed at fostering mutual understanding on issues affecting justice and freedom throughout the world. The first colloquium drew scholars from Lebanon, Iran, India, Pakistan, Nigeria, Japan, Italy, the United States and Canada. In 1981, it initiated “The Rothko Chapel Awards to Commitment to Truth and Freedom." In 1986, a second award was established to honor and emulate the spirit of Óscar Romero, Archbishop of San Salvador, who was murdered on March 24, 1980. These Rothko Chapel Awards have recognized individuals and organizations who, at great risk, denounce violations of human rights. In 1991 the Rothko Chapel marked its 20th anniversary with a joint award with the Carter-Menil Human Rights Foundation, founded in 1986 with former President Jimmy Carter. Nelson Mandela was the keynote speaker and received the special Rothko Chapel award.

In early 1999, the Rothko Chapel closed for a major renovation. The paintings had been exhibiting premature signs of age, and the largest could not be removed for treatment. In 2000, the chapel reopened after an 18-month, $1.8 million renovation, with the artist's paintings newly restored.

In May 2018, museum staff discovered the Chapel had been vandalized. White paint was spilled near the Chapel's entrance and in the reflecting pool surrounding the Broken Obelisk sculpture. Handbills had been strewn around the grounds and pool that read "It's okay to be white", an alt-right slogan.

For its fiftieth anniversary in 2021, the Rothko Chapel underwent $30 million in restoration to hew nearer the original plan. The 2019-2021 work removed the baffled skylight in favor of a new louvered skylight designed by George Sexton Associates; re-landscaped nearby lawns and fencing; removed glass doors; and added a new visitor center designed by Architecture Research Office.

In July 2024, the Rothko Chapel suffered extensive damage from stormwater during Hurricane Beryl. Three of Rothko's murals were damaged, along with the chapel's ceiling and walls. The chapel was closed in August 2024 for renovations and restoration. The building reopened in December 2024 after reparative work was completed.

== Architecture ==
The chapel is an irregular octagonal brick building with gray or rose stucco walls and a skylight. It serves as a place of meditation as well as a meeting hall and is furnished with eight simple, moveable benches for meditative seating; more are provided to accommodate the audience for special events. Holy books from several religions are available.

As renovated in 2020 by Architecture Research Office and George Sexton Associates, the louvered skylight diffuser consists of 280 reflective aluminum blades that are individually angled and spaced to ensure an even distribution of light onto the paintings along the perimeter walls.

== Works of art ==
The chapel is associated with several works of art other than the building itself, in the fields of painting, sculpture, and music.

=== Paintings ===
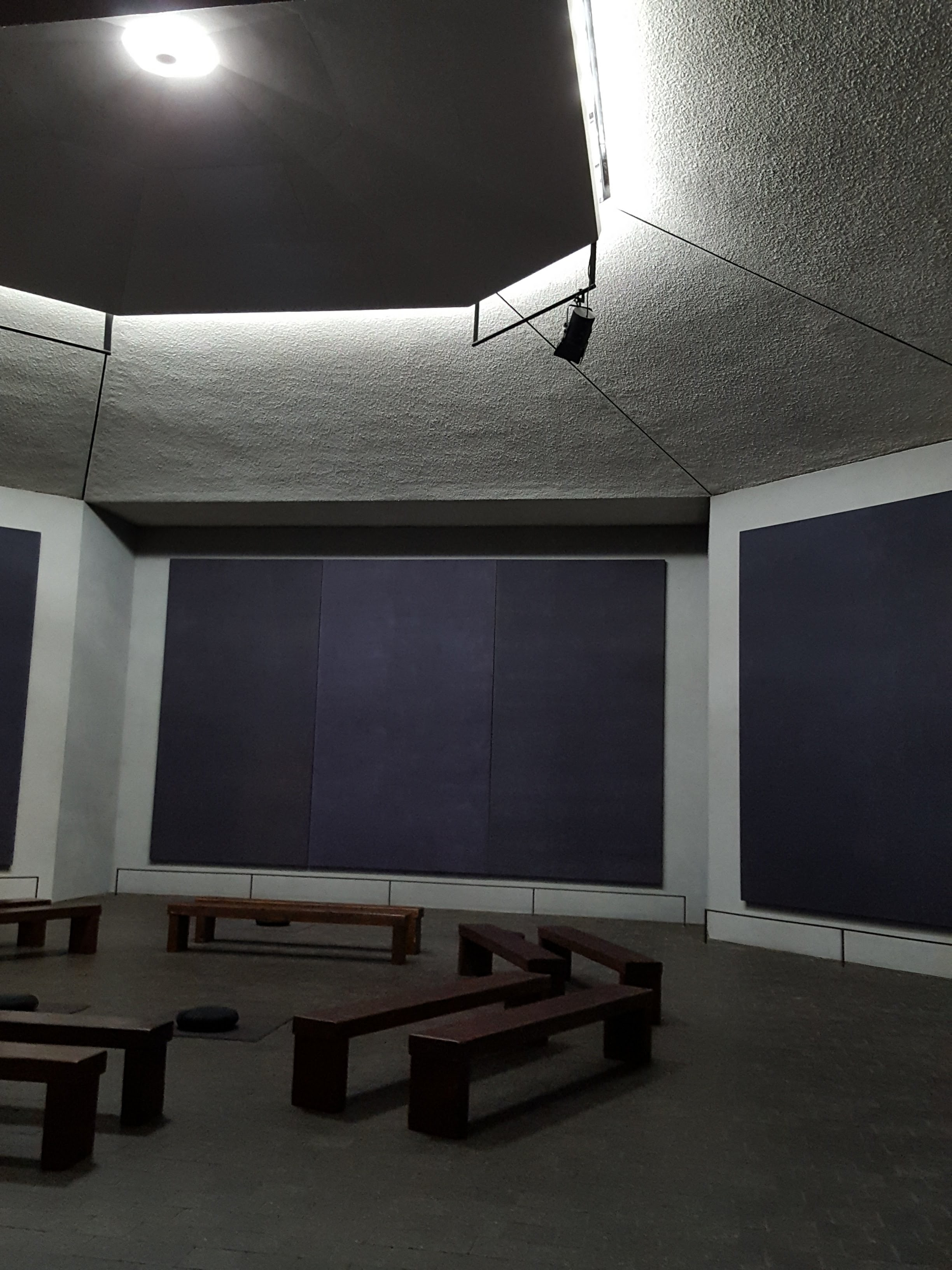
Rothko chapel interior

Fourteen of Rothko's paintings are displayed in the chapel. Three walls display triptychs, while the other five walls display single paintings. Beginning in 1964, Rothko began painting a series of black paintings, which incorporated other dark hues and texture effects.

The de Menils offered Rothko a commission for the chapel in 1964. From the fall of 1964 through the spring of 1967, he painted the fourteen large paintings and four alternates, which incorporated many of the characteristics of the earlier 1964 black paintings.

=== Sculpture ===
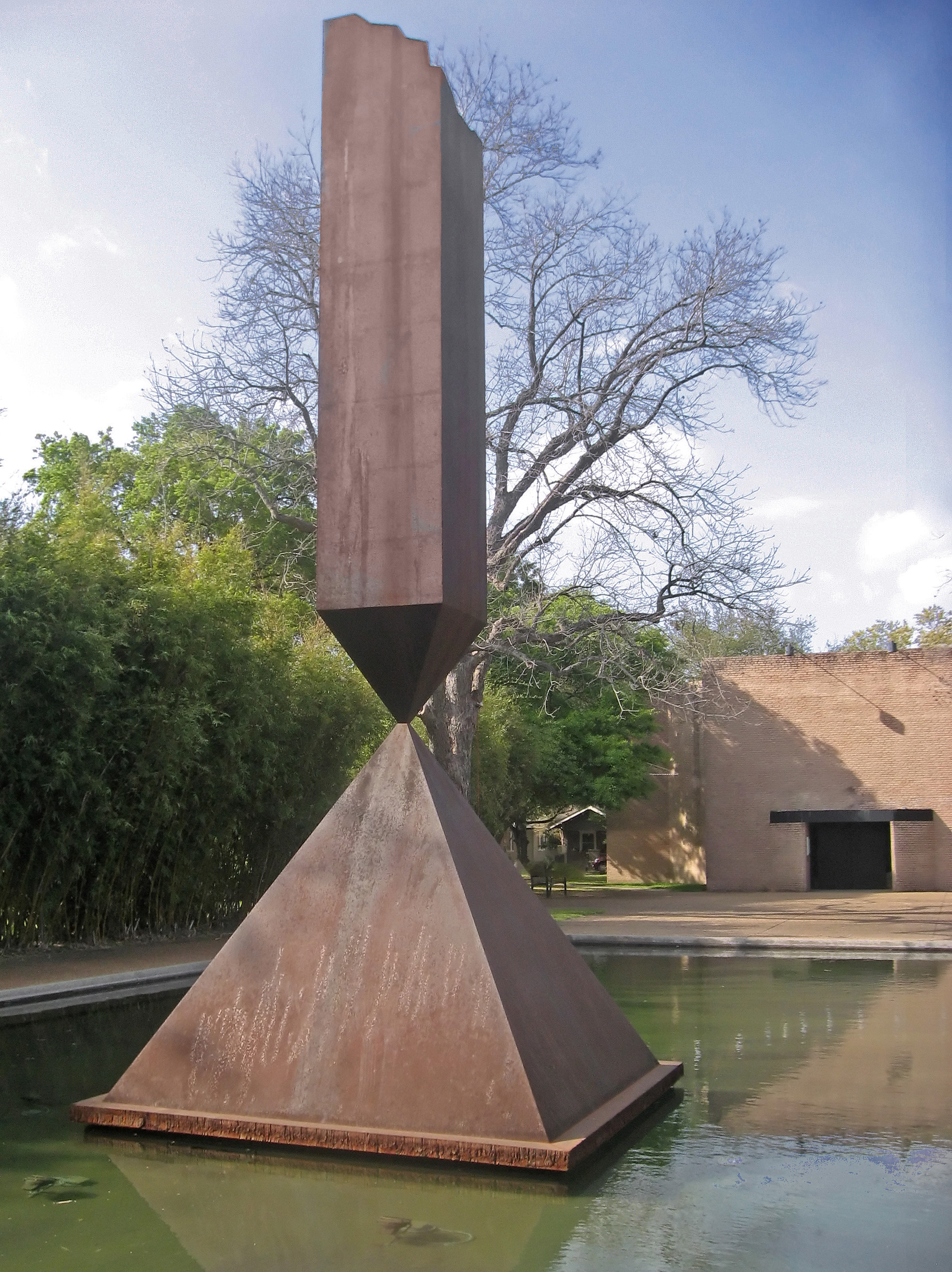
Broken Obelisk in front of the Rothko Chapel

A distinctive sculpture by Barnett Newman, Broken Obelisk, was installed in 1970 in front of the chapel. The sculpture sits in a reflecting pool designed by Philip Johnson and it is dedicated to the memory of Martin Luther King Jr., who was assassinated in 1968. The sculpture originally stood in Washington, D.C., and was offered in 1969 by the de Menils as a memorial to King to stand in front of Houston City Hall. Houston turned down the gift and the de Menils then donated the sculpture and the Rothko paintings to start the Rothko Chapel.

=== Music ===
One of Morton Feldman's best known pieces of music was inspired by and written to be performed in the chapel—it too is called Rothko Chapel (1971). The musician Peter Gabriel wrote a 1992 song called "Fourteen Black Paintings" which was inspired by a visit to the chapel. David Dondero composed a song entitled "Rothko Chapel" that appears on his 2007 album Simple Love. Visiting Tibetan Gyuto Tantric monks performed harmonic chanting in April 1986. Houston Grand Opera's HGOco commissioned and premiered an opera in 2017 about the chapel called Some Light Emerges, with music by Laura Kaminsky, concept by Mark Campbell and libretto by Campbell and Kimberly Reed.

In 2019, Solange Knowles filmed scenes for the visual album When I Get Home in the chapel. Dessa's 2023 album Bury the Lede includes a song called "Rothko", which is set in the chapel and references the paintings.

== Recognition ==
As a focal point of dialogue between social justice, artistic, and spiritual leaders, the Rothko Chapel has been the recipient of several notable awards, including the Peace Award from The Houston Baha’í Community (1998), a Community Award from the Museum District Business Alliance (2000), The James L. Tucker Interfaith Award from Interfaith Ministries (2004), an Urban Greenery Award from The Park People (2005), and recognitions from the Houston Peace and Justice Center (2008).

The Rothko Chapel also hosts the biannual Óscar Romero Award to recognize "courageous, grassroots, human rights advocacy." Past awardees include Bishop Proaño, Cardinal Arns, the Oslobodjenje, Sr. Dianna Ortiz, Salima Ghezali, and Berta Cáceres.

== See also ==
- Menil Collection
- Michael Somoroff
