= Mesnil (surname) =

Mesnil is a surname, and may refer to:

- Félix Mesnil (1868–1938), French zoologist, biologist, botanist, mycologist and algologist
- François-Jean de Mesnil-Durand (1736–1799), French tactician
- Jacques Mesnil (1872–1940), Belgian journalist, art critic, art historian and anarchist
- Romain Mesnil (born 1977), French pole vaulter

== See also ==
- de Ménil
