= John Rewald =

American art historian

John Rewald, circa 1973

John Rewald (May 12, 1912 – February 2, 1994) was a German-American academic, author and art historian. He is known for his studies of Cézanne, Renoir, Pissarro, Seurat, Van Gogh and Gauguin; and is regarded as the foremost authority on Impressionism and Post-Impressionism, about which he wrote two landmark surveys, History of Impression (1946) and its sequel, Post-Impressionism: From Van Gogh to Gauguin (1956).

== Biography ==
He was born Gustav Rewald at Berlin, of a middle-class, professional family. Rewald came from a Jewish background. He completed his Abitur in Hamburg, and studied thereafter at several German universities, going to the Sorbonne in Paris in 1932. At the Sorbonne he wrote his dissertation on the friendship of Zola and Cézanne, having to persuade the academic authorities on this because Cézanne (died 1906) was considered too recent a figure.

When France declared war on Germany in 1939, he was interned as an enemy alien. He emigrated to the United States in 1941 and Alfred Barr, director of the New York Museum of Modern Art, was his sponsor. From 1943 on, he consulted for the Museum of Modern Art, organizing exhibitions for it and other museums and researching his magnum opus, a history of Impressionism. The History of Impressionism was published in 1946 to universal acclaim.

In 1955, Rewald served as technical director of Lust For Life, Metro-Goldwyn Mayer's film version of Irving Stone's bestselling biographical novel about Vincent van Gogh. Using his connections with various museums and wealthy collectors he advised, he was able to secure several dozen actual Van Gogh paintings for use in the film and he helped producer John Houseman develop a special process that would allow the paintings to be exposed to the intense heat needed to photograph them without damage.

Rewald was a visiting professor at Princeton University between 1961 and 1964. He joined the faculty of the University of Chicago in 1964 and remained there till 1971. In that year he received an appointment as 'distinguished professor of art history' at the Graduate School and University Center of The City University of New York. 1977 saw him organizing the major 'Cézanne: The Late Work' exhibition at MoMA with William Rubin. He spent the year 1979 as the A. W. Mellon Lecturer at the National Gallery of Art in Washington and retired from CUNY in 1984.

A devoted Cézanne scholar, he was instrumental in creating a foundation to save Cézanne's studio and turn it into a museum. It is now a permanent museum in Aix-en-Provence, L'atelier Cézanne, and can be viewed as it was at the painter's death. The citizens of Aix, in gratitude to Rewald, named a plaza after him.

Rewald died of congestive heart failure at age 81. He is buried close to Cézanne, at Aix-en-Provence cemetery.

== Rewald's Significance ==
Rewald's life and work were shaped by his experiences across different political and cultural areas, including the German Empire, the Weimar Republic of Germany, the French Third Republic. He is recognized for a scholarly approach that emphasized factual documentation and primary sources over psychological interpretation. Critics and collogues has noted his writing style for its clarity and sobriety. Art historian Judd Tully described his pros as "beautifully" written in three languages, characterized by a factual rigor that occasionally transitioned into more lyrical passages.

In 1983, Theodore Reff, Professor of Art History at Columbia University commented: "He is more responsible than anyone else for putting the study of Impressionism and Post-Impressionism on solid scholarly foundations. What he set out to do, he did more thoroughly and scrupulously than anybody else, and he did it first."

Complementing his career as an academic, he served as one of the founding members of the board of directors of the International Foundation for Art Research.

== Selected works ==
In a statistical overview derived from writings by and about John Rewald, OCLC/WorldCat encompasses roughly 600+ works in 1,400+ publications in 24 languages and 33,000+ library holdings.

- Cézanne et Zola (1936)
- Maillol (1939)
- Georges Seurat (1943)
- History of Impressionism (1946)
- Paul Cézanne (1948)
- Pierre Bonnard (1948)
- Les Fauves (1952)
- History of Post-Impressionism: From van Gogh to Gauguin (1956)
- Studies in Impressionism (1986)
- Studies in Post-Impressionism (1986)
- Cézanne, a Biography (1986)
- Seurat, a Biography (1990)
- Camille Pissarro (1963)
- The Impressionist Brush (1973/74)
- Cézanne, the Steins, and their Circle (1987)
- Cézanne in America (1989)
- The Paintings of Paul Cézanne: A Catalogue Raisonné (1996), with Walter Feilchenfeldt and Jayne Warman

Edited works

- Camille Pissarro at the Musée du Louvre (1939)
- Paul Cézanne, Letters (1941)
- Paul Gauguin, Letters (1943)
- Camille Pissarro, Letters to his Son Lucien (1943)
- The Woodcuts of Aristide Maillol (1943), catalogue raisonné
- Renoir, Drawings (1946)
- Paul Cézanne, Carnets de Dessins (1951)
- The Sculptures of Edgar Degas (1957), catalogue raisonné
- Gauguin, Drawings (1958)
