= Broken Obelisk =

Sculpture by Barnett Newman

- Artist: Barnett Newman
- Year: 1963–1967; 1969; 2005 (Exhibition Copy)
- Medium: Weathering steel

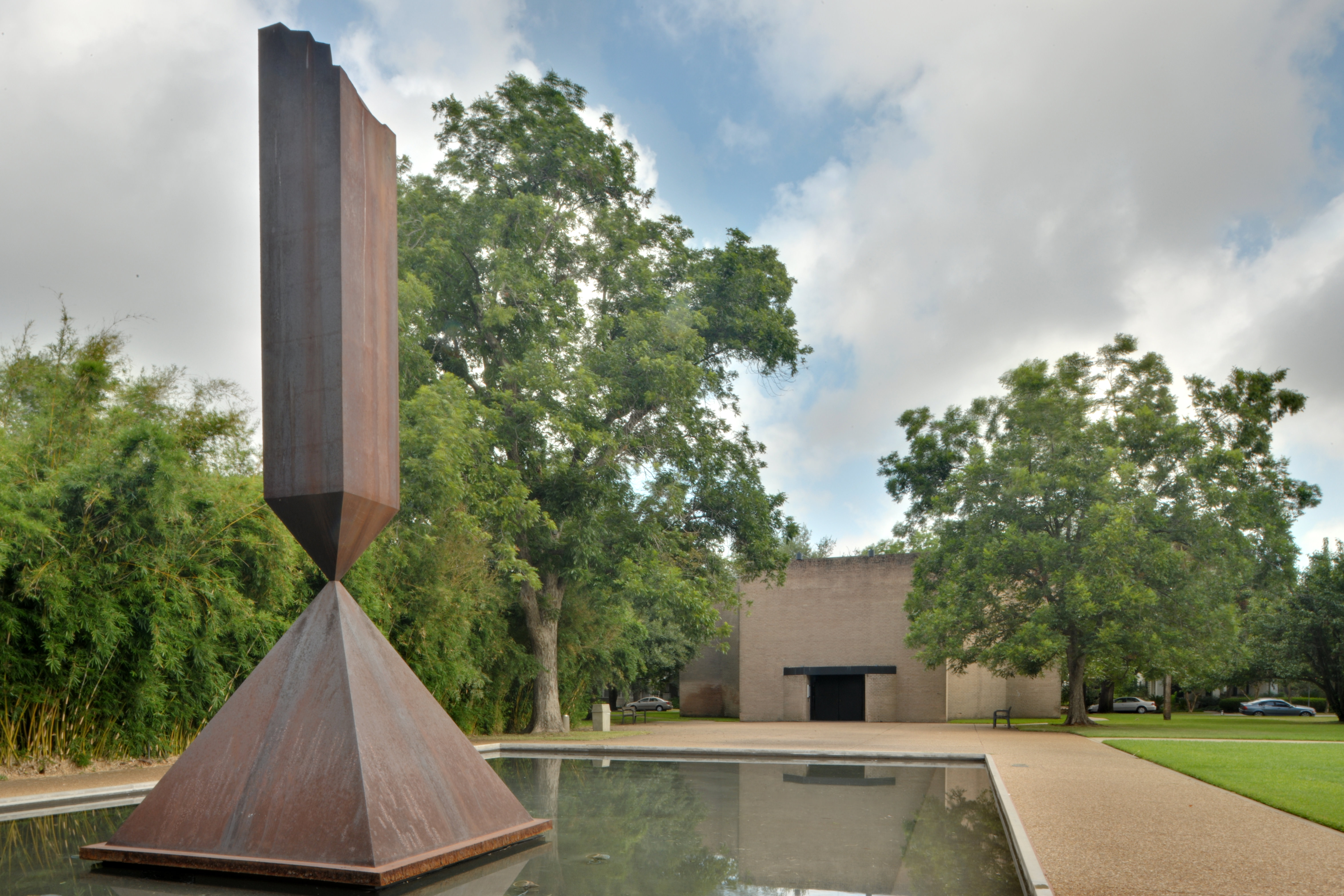
Broken Obelisk in front of Rothko Chapel in Houston, Texas.

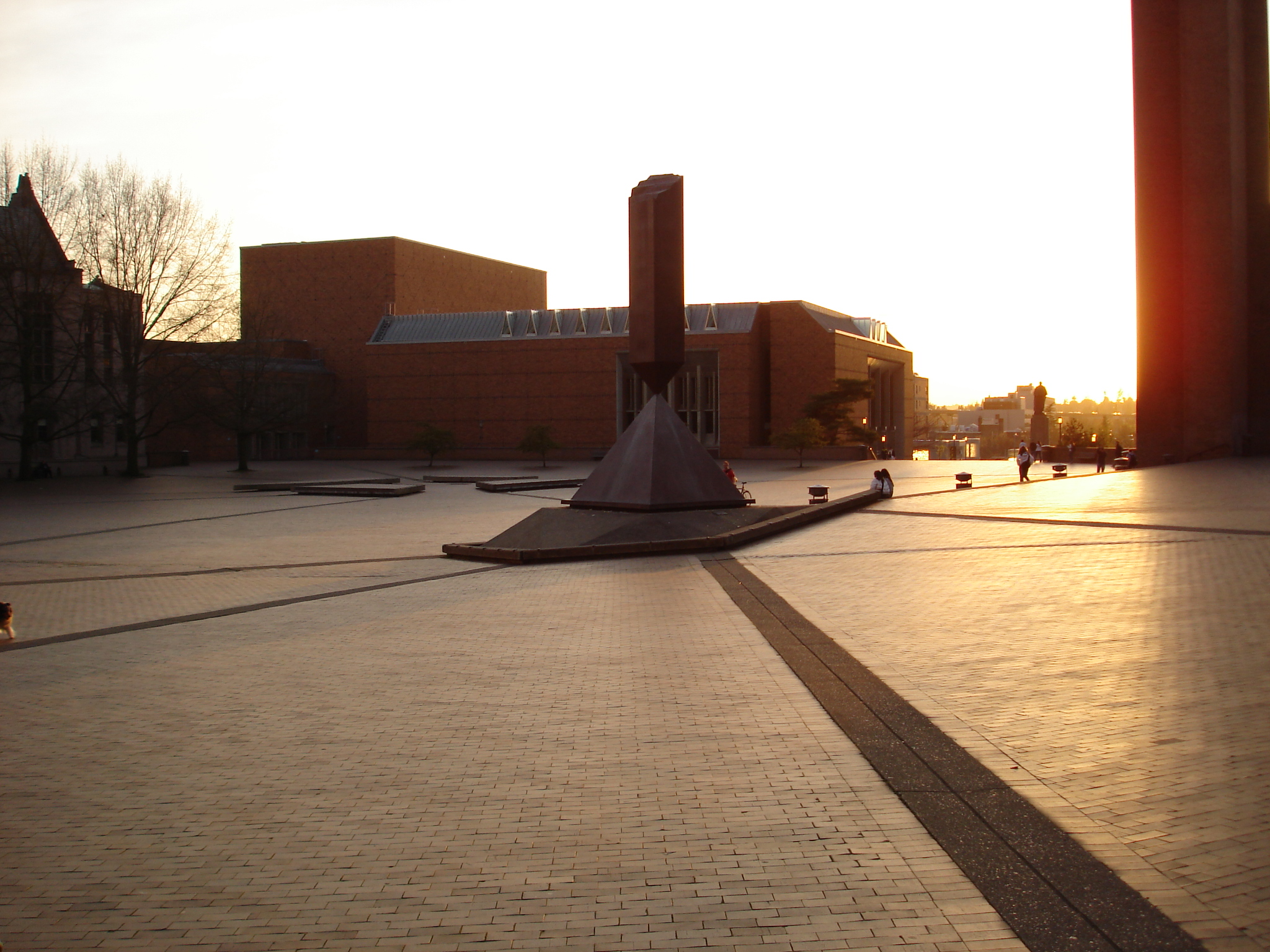
Broken Obelisk in the University of Washington's Red Square

Broken Obelisk is a sculpture designed by Barnett Newman between 1963 and 1967. Fabricated from three tons of Cor-Ten steel, which acquires a rust-colored patina, it is the largest and best known of his six sculptures.

The first two multiples of the sculpture were fabricated by Lippincott, Inc. in North Haven, Connecticut in 1966–67. The sculpture first appeared on display in front of the Seagram Building in New York City and outside the Corcoran Gallery of Art in Washington, DC where it was part of an exhibit titled "Scale and Content" (1967), which also consisted of Tony Smith's Smoke and Ronald Bladen's The X. Broken Obelisk generated some controversy in Washington, as it appeared to be a reference to a broken upside-down Washington Monument at a time of civil unrest. When Corcoran director James Harithas resigned in 1969, Barnett Newman had the sculpture removed.

A third multiple, which included some internal, structural improvements, was completed in 1969 by Lippincott, Inc., which became part of the permanent collection of the Museum of Modern Art in New York City. For a short period of time in 1969–70, the first three multiples of this sculpture sat side by side at the Lippincott, Inc. foundry in North Haven. One was secured by John de Menil with a matching grant from the National Foundation for the Arts and Humanities and was installed on the grounds of the Rothko Chapel in Houston in 1970, surrounded by a reflecting pool. As a condition set by de Menil, the sculpture in Houston is dedicated to Martin Luther King Jr.

Virginia Wright secured another multiple, which was installed in Red Square on the campus of the University of Washington in Seattle in 1971.

With the permission of the Barnett Newman Foundation, a fourth multiple was commissioned in 2003 and completed in 2005–06 by Lippincott, Merrifield, and Roberts. This last of the four multiples was installed in front of the Neue Nationalgalerie in Berlin in 2007–08 and later acquired by Storm King Art Center. In the summer of 2014, all four multiples were on display in the United States at the following locations: Rothko Chapel, Houston; Red Square, University of Washington, Seattle; Museum of Modern Art, New York City; and Storm King Art Center, New Windsor, New York.

Art critic Robert Hughes, writing on Broken Obelisk in 1971, said:

Newman's pursuit of the sublime lay less in nature than in culture. This enabled him to pick ancient, man-made forms and return them to pristine significance without a trace of piracy. One index of that ability was his sculpture. Broken Obelisk, perhaps the best American sculpture of its time, is Newman's meditation on ancient Egypt: a steel pyramid, from whose apex an inverted obelisk rises like a beam of light. Here, Newman bypassed the Western associations of pyramids and broken columns with death, and produced a life-affirming image of transcendence. That unruffled self-sufficiency, beyond style, gave Newman's work its mysterious didactic value. It is not 'expressive'; the silence at the core bespeaks a man for whom art was a philosophical activity, a way of knowledge.

== Locations ==
Four versions of the sculpture exist. Three originals were fabricated in the 1960s during the artist's life; two in 1967, and a third for MoMA in 1969. A fourth "Exhibition Copy" was completed in 2005.

- Museum of Modern Art
- Rothko Chapel
- Red Square at the University of Washington
  Broken Obelisk was installed in 1971 at the Red Square at the University of Washington's main campus in Seattle. The sculpture was a gift by art collector and philanthropist Virginia Wright.
- A 2005 exhibition copy
