= Fariha al Jerrahi =

American Sufi leader (born 1947)

Fariha Fatima al-Jerrahi (born Philippa de Menil; June 13, 1947) is an American art curator and co-founder of the Dia Art Foundation. She is also the spiritual guide and Sheikha of the Nur Ashki Jerrahi Sufi Order in New York City.

== Biography ==
She was born in 1947 into a socially committed, eclectic French Catholic family in Houston, Texas. Her parents were French-American art collectors and philanthropists Dominique de Menil, and John de Menil, both of whom established respective art foundations: the International Foundation for Art Research, and the Menil Collection. Dominique was an heiress to the Schlumberger Limited oil-equipment fortune.

In 1974, de Menil, along with then-husband, art dealer Heiner Friedrich; and Helen Winkler, established the Dia Art Foundation nonprofit to provide funding to artistic endeavors – reminiscent of patronage systems from the Renaissance era.

In 1985, Dia experienced a period of financial upheaval after the collapse of the Schlumberger stock, prompting a series of controversial decisions that severely affected artists' budgets and risking the foundation's collections since de Menil was no longer able to offer financial support personally. Dia was forced to take out a $3.8 million loan from Citibank, secured by 140,000 shares of de Menil's stock. After a restructuring of the board, wherein Friedrich had departed and Winkler was ousted, de Menil's mother, Dominique, had installed former Metropolitan Museum of Art executive vice president Ashton Hawkins as chairman, with Philippa (now under her Sufi Muslim name Fariha al-Jerrahi) still maintaining a seat.

=== Path to Sufism ===
At the age of 29, she met her mentor and guide on the path of Sufism upon his first visit to the Americas, Sheikh Muzaffer Özak Âșkî al-Jerrahi of Istanbul. She received direct transmission from him in 1980. Sheikh Muzaffer also gave direct transmission to fellow American dervish Sheikh Nur al-Anwar al-Jerrahi, who envisioned a radical and illumined path of the heart which he called Universal Islam. Coincidentally, Sheikh Muzaffer, had died the night before the first new Dia board meeting, and she embraced it as a sign of change. After Sheikh Nur's death, she would take on the guidance of the Nur Ashki Jerrahi Sufi Order and its circles of dervishes around the world.

Sheikha Fariha al-Jerrahi leads devotional prayers, ceremonies of divine remembrance, and provides spiritual guidance to initiates from her seat at the Dergah al-Farah, a Sufi lodge in downtown Manhattan, which was opened by the Dia Art Foundation in a former firehouse at 155 Mercer Street, and was later moved to 245 West Broadway during Dia's restructuring. While fostering bonds with the greater Sufi and Muslim American communities, the role of women in Islam and spiritual ecology have been of special importance to her message.

== See also ==
- Lex Hixon
- Jerrahi Sufi Order
