= Howard Barnstone =

American architect

Howard Barnstone (March 27, 1923 – April 29, 1987) was an American architect. He was best known for his work with Mark Rothko on the Rothko Chapel, and for the houses and public buildings he designed with Preston M. Bolton and Gene Aubry in the 1950s and 1960s, largely in Houston and Galveston. Barnstone attended Yale College and the Yale School of Architecture, from which he received a Bachelor of Architecture in 1948. He was a professor at the University of Houston College of Architecture and Design for more than thirty years. From 1952 to 1961, Barnstone was a partner in Bolton & Barnstone, one of Houston´s most public modern architectural firms at the time; the firm became Barnstone and Aubry (1966-1970) after he partnered with Aubry, his former student. Architectural historian Stephen Fox characterized Barnstone's approach as one committed to personal vision, free inquiry, and delight over orthodoxy or conventional wisdom, resulting in diverse buildings that combined proportional grace with wit and charm, and diminutive scale with spatial expansiveness.

== Early life ==
Howard Barnstone was born on March 27, 1923, to Robert C. and Dora (Lempert) Barnstone in Auburn, Maine. He grew up in Maine and New York City. He attended Amherst College before graduating from Yale in 1944.

== Career ==
Barnstone served in the United States Navy from 1944 to 1946. He arrived in Houston in 1948.

Architecture writers identify Mies van der Rohe, Philip Johnson and Charles Eames as influences on the houses Barnstone and Bolton designed, such as the Lawrence Blum (1954), Gordon (1955), Moustier (1956) and Winterbotham (I960) structures; they have been described externally as geometrically precise, surely proportioned "structural cages," whose idiosyncratic internal plans contrasted open, glass-walled spaces with intimate, compact enclosures. Barnstone's work with Aubry in the 1960s moved away from the van der Rohe influence to incorporate historical, vernacular and "New Brutalism" influences (e.g., the Galveston News Building, 1965). Their public buildings include the "Art Barn" (Rice Museum at Rice University, 1969–1970), Vassar Place Apartments (1965, featured in Architectural Record), and Guinan Hall (1971, part of Philip Johnson's modernist campus design for the University of St. Thomas) in Houston. The Art Barn was a corrugated-iron, tension-cable-supported structure commissioned by art collectors Dominique and John De Menil as a temporary exhibition site; the structure remained in use for over 40 years, its industrial aesthetic, jutting angles and elegant proportions serving as inspiration for Houston's “Tin House” architectural movement. Barnstone and Aubry also built several notable houses: the Maher (1964), Bell (1969) and Kempner (1969) in Houston, and the Levin in Galveston (1969), among others. Architectural historians describe them as externally self-effacing structures emphasizing intimacy, anonymity and solemnity, which opened "internally with high ceilings, simple planar walls, and dramatic expanses of glass"; The Maher House was featured in Architectural Record in 1965 and in the book, 25 Years of Record Houses. Barnstone's built works of the 1970s and 1980s were eclectic and sometimes explored postmodern styles.

== Works ==
Barnstone published two books. The Galveston That Was (Macmillan 1966) is a heavily illustrated book about the historic architecture of Galveston, featuring principal photography by Henri Cartier-Bresson and Ezra Stoller. The Architecture of John F. Staub (University of Texas Press 1979) documents the work of noted Houston architect John F. Staub (1892-1981).

== Death and legacy ==
Barnstone died on April 29, 1987. He is buried at Forest Park East Cemetery in League City, Texas.

Barnstone's drawings and papers are available in the Houston Library's "Howard Barnstone Collection".
