= Gene Aubry =

American architect (1935–2023)

- Born: Eugene Edwards Aubry; November 15, 1935; Galveston, Texas, U.S.
- Died: December 9, 2023 (aged 88); Palmetto, Texas, U.S.
- Education: University of Houston
- Occupation: Architect
- Buildings: Rothko Chapel, Art Barn (Houston)

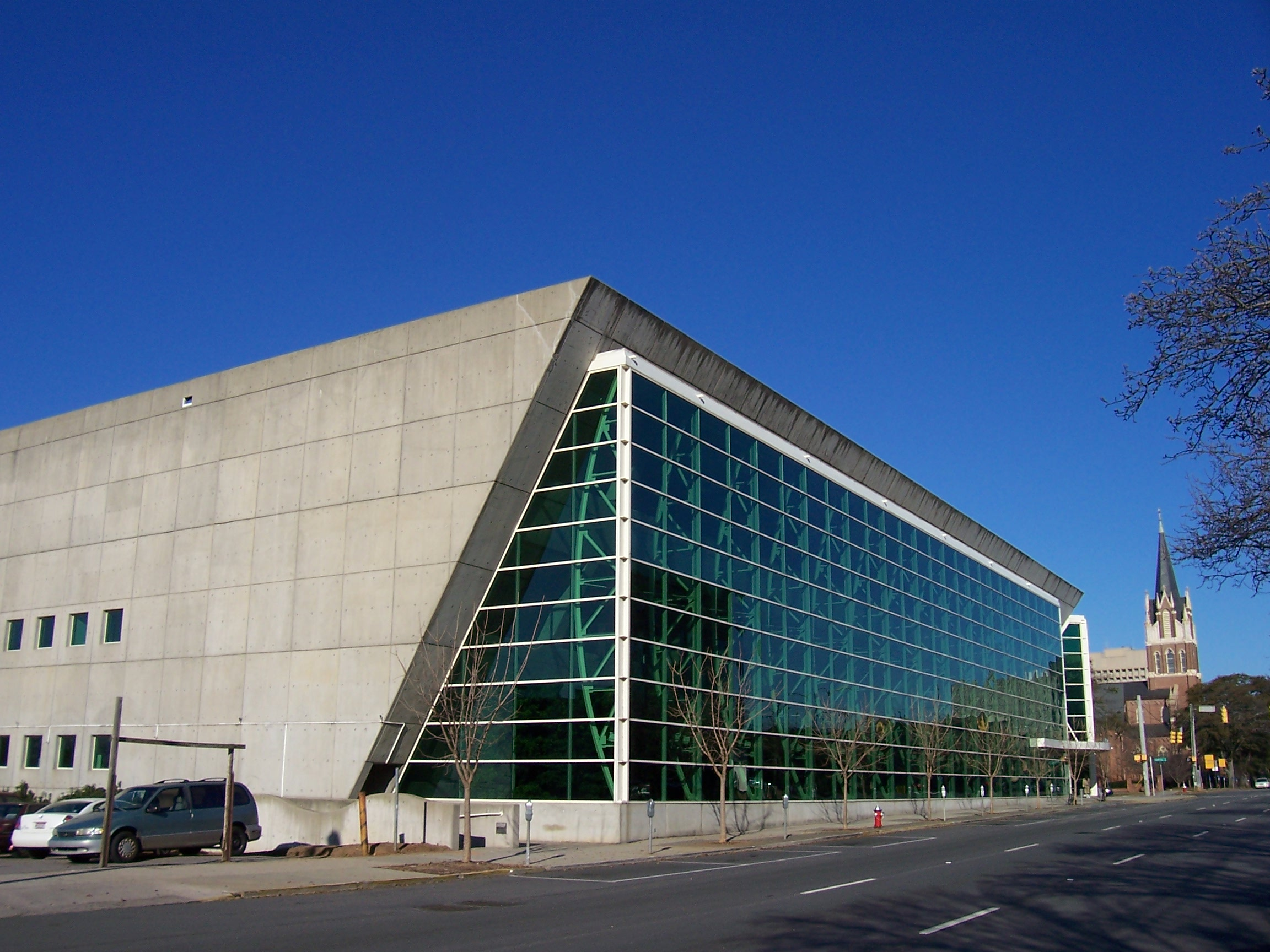
Richland Library in Richland County, South Carolina

Eugene Edwards Aubry (November 15, 1935 – December 9, 2023) was an American architect, based primarily in Houston, Texas and later in Orlando, Florida. He was best known for the public buildings and houses he designed and co-designed in Houston, notably the Rice Museum (known locally as the "Art Barn") at Rice University and the Alfred C. Glassell School of Art at the Museum of Fine Art Houston (both no longer standing), the Rothko Chapel, and Wortham Center. Architecture writers credit the Art Barn's industrial aesthetic with inspiring Houston's so-called "Tin House" movement, as well adaptations by Frank Gehry. Aubry was partners with two other well-known Houston architects, Howard Barnstone and S.I. Morris, and worked on projects with Philip Johnson before starting his own firm, Aubry Architects in Sarasota, Florida in 1986. He completed the Rothko Chapel after artist Mark Rothko clashed with Johnson, who was the original architect.

== Life ==
Aubry was born Eugene Edwards Aubry in Galveston, Texas on November 15, 1935, to Frank J. and Christine C. (Anderson) Aubry. He originally intended to study music, but was dissuaded by his father and pursued architecture at the University of Houston. He studied there with Howard Barnstone, then a partner in the firm Bolton & Barnstone and one of Houston's most publicized modern architects. Aubry worked in Houston within and as a partner in several firms until 1985, when he moved to Anna Maria, Florida, where he continued as an architect and also served as a city commissioner. Aubry died in Palmetto, Texas on December 9, 2023, at the age of 88.

== Career ==
Aubry worked part-time at Bolton & Barnstone in 1959, before joining full-time after completing his studies in 1960; he was a partner at the renamed Barnstone and Aubry from 1966-1970. Aubry worked with Barnstone on public buildings and houses, largely in Houston and Galveston. Their public buildings include the Art Barn and Rice Media Center at Rice University (1969–1970) and Guinan Hall (1971, part of Phillip Johnson's modernist campus design for the University of St. Thomas) in Houston, as well as the San Luis Hotel and Condominium on Seawall Boulevard and Galveston News Building (1965) in Galveston.

Aubry worked with S.I. Morris, as a partner in Wilson, Morris, Crain & Anderson (1970-1980) and Morris/Aubry Architects (1980-1986). The firm designed several well-known buildings in Houston, including: the 49-story First City Tower (1981), the 1301 Fannin building (1984), the Alley Theatre Center (1984), the 52-story Continental Center I (1984), and Wortham Center (1987). The firm also designed the postmodern, tiered Bank of America Center (1987) skyscraper and duPont Centre in Orlando.

In the 1980s, an economic slump hit the oil industry, severely curtailing Houston construction projects. The Morris/Aubry staff ultimately shrunk to 100 from 300, and Aubry left the partnership and Houston, starting a smaller firm, Aubry Architects, in Sarasota in 1986, which later merged with PGAL Architects. His projects there include Frances Pew Hayes Hall in Naples, Florida (1989), the Richland Library in Richland County, South Carolina (1993), The Remington, a concrete high-rise in Naples, Florida (1996), the Selby Public Library in Sarasota, Florida (1998), and The Baker Museum in Naples, Florida (2000).

== Notable projects ==
Aubry worked on notable projects throughout his career, independently, and with Johnson, Barnstone, and Morris.

=== Barnstone and Aubry projects ===
Aubry's work with Barnstone in the 1960s moved away from the latter's Mies van der Rohe-influenced, precisionist approach toward more complex design schemes that admitted historical, vernacular and "New Brutalism" influences (e.g., the Galveston News Building, 1965); architectural historian Stephen Fox noted the work for its sense of "delight, spontaneity, and anti-pretentious expediency." Writers identify their houses—including the Maher (1964), Bell (1969), Kempner (1969) houses and Vassar Place Apartments (1965, featured in Architectural Record) in Houston and the Levin House in Galveston (1969)—as among their most notable structures. They describe them as "architecturally introverted" designs that incorporated intimacy, anonymity and solemnity, with self-effacing exteriors that open "internally with high ceilings, simple planar walls, and dramatic expanses of glass." The Maher House was featured in Architectural Record in 1965 and later included in book, 25 Years of Record Houses. Stephen Fox described the house's dramatic steel and glass living-dining room, which some suggest seemed to float among the trees, as possibly the "most awe-inspiring architectural feat for a private residence" in 1960s Houston.

The Art Barn at Rice University, a corrugated-iron, tension-cable-supported structure was built in 1969; its adjacent companion, the more abstract Rice Media Center, was built a year later. Area architecture writers suggest the buildings played an instrumental role in the development of Houston's arts community and its architectural history, inspiring the “Tin House” aesthetic that some consider Houston's only self-created architectural statement for the 20th century. They were commissioned by art collectors, Dominique and John De Menil, as an urgent, temporary solution to their need for a building to house a large art show coming from New York's Museum of Modern Art, “The Machine as Seen at the End of the Mechanical Age.” According to Aubry, "We literally sketched it on a pad—there were never any plans. It was built in 10 weeks." The building opened just in time for the March 1969 exhibit, which was attended by thirty-thousand viewers; it remained in use for over 40 years. Critics suggest that the de Menils' support for its style provided a cultural legitimacy that paved the way for emulation by Tin House architects, who embraced its industrial aesthetic and exterior cladding, jutting angles and asymmetrical composition, and elegantly simple rectangular plan and proportions, which recalled a style of vernacular Gulf Coast house.

=== Rothko Chapel ===
Aubry took over the design of the nondenominational Rothko Chapel after Philip Johnson and Rothko clashed over their distinctive ideas for the building. Rothko believed the monumentality of Johnson's plan distracted from the artwork. It went through several revisions, first with Howard Barnstone, until he became ill, and then with Aubry, who completed the project in 1971. The windowless, brick-octagon, skylit final design was intended to create an unadorned place of contemplation, centered on Rothko's 14 minimal, abstract expressionist canvasses. Unfortunately, Rothko did not live to see the chapel's completion due to his suicide in 1970.

=== Morris/Aubry Architects projects ===
Morris/Aubry Architects, based in Houston, designed projects there and throughout the United States, including in Austin, Denver, Oklahoma City, Nashville, New Orleans, and Galveston. Two of their most well-known buildings in Houston are the Wortham Center and the Alfred C. Glassell School of Art. The dark-red granite Wortham Center serves as a performing arts venue and community center housing two theaters and is home to the Houston Ballet and Houston Grand Opera. The two-story, concrete-and-glass-block Glassell School of Art was commissioned by the Museum of Fine Art Houston (following a donation by trustee Alfred C. Glassell Jr.) to serve as the new (and first) home for its school of art in order to accommodate a growing student body. The 42,000-square-foot building's modernist plan was drawn up by Aubry and R. Nolen Willis. The rectangular, practical design emulated a warehouse, with exterior materials that reduced heat and filtered sunlight. Mark Lamster called it "a tour-de-force of reflective glass block." The Glassell School of Art opened to the public on January 13, 1979. It was replaced by a new building, designed by Steven Holl Architects in 2014.

== Legacy ==
Writers suggest that Aubry's greatest legacy is the influence that the Art Barn has had on Houston's Tin House movement and the role his buildings (e.g., the Glassell School of Art) have played in the history of Houston's arts community. In 2014, however, both buildings were demolished by officials citing expanding needs or high renovation costs; both events generated public outcry from the local architecture, arts, and historical preservationist communities. Regarding the Glassell building's replacement, Stephen Fox observed, “For the museum to sacrifice its own architectural heritage bespeaks an institutional tendency, prevalent in Houston, to discount existing architecture and sweep it away.”

Aubry himself sought to preserve the area's architectural legacy with his work on the book, Born on the Island: The Galveston We Remember, commissioned by the Galveston Historical Foundation Aubry contributed sixty-seven watercolors and drawings (with text by Stephen Fox), intended to capture and enhance the visual and historical record of the buildings and the unique local architectural style of the Texas gulf city where he was born.
