= Wendy Watriss =

American photographer, curator, journalist, and writer

- Born: Wendy Watriss; February 15, 1943; San Francisco, California
- Education: New York University
- Occupations: photographer, journalist, writer
- Spouse: Fred Baldwin
- Awards: World Press Photo Awards; Oskar Barnack Award; Lifetime Achievement Award (Houston Fine Arts Fair)

Wendy Watriss (born 1943) is an American photographer, curator, journalist, and writer.

== Background ==
Watriss was born in San Francisco and spent most of her childhood between the East Coast of the United States and Europe. She studied English and Philosophy and graduated with honors from New York University. Watriss then worked in Florida as a political reporter for two and a half years, and then returned to New York to work at a public television station for three years. In 1969 while living in Manhattan, Watriss met Fred Baldwin, her husband and artistic collaborator.

== Career ==
Watriss's first photojournalist assignment came in 1971 for Signature magazine, where she spent three months traveling in West Africa. As a journalist, Watriss covered the religious conflict in Sub-Saharan Africa, Women's Strike for Peace, Vietnam veterans and Agent Orange, and drug use in the US. She worked as a professional photographer from 1970 to 1992. Her work has been published in Life, Stern (Germany), Geo, Photoreportages (France), The New York Times, Bild (Sweden), Christian Science Monitor, among others. Watriss has also done work for the United Nations. Her first collaboration with Baldwin was "Backroads of America", a road trip they took in 1971 documenting a wide spectrum of society in Texas.

In 1983 Watriss co-founded FotoFest with Fred Baldwin, a photography exhibition recurring annually in Houston, Texas. The festival highlights new and emerging artists from all over the world and examines social, cultural, and political issues through the works selected. She became the senior curator and Artistic Director of FotoFest in 1990 and has developed over 60 exhibitions during her tenure.

Watriss is the author of several books, including Image and Memory, Photography from Latin America 1866–1994, co-authored with Lois Parkinson Zamora. Watriss' photography is included in collections at The Amon Carter Museum; Museum of Fine Arts, Houston; The Menil Collection; The Humanities Research Center, University of Texas at Austin; Bibliothèque Nationale in Paris; Musée de la Photographie, Charleroi, Belgium, as well as in private collections. Watriss, with Baldwin, also briefly taught at the University of Texas at Austin in a combined program with the Journalism and American Studies departments.

== Awards ==
Watriss has received awards from The World Press Foundation (The Netherlands), Oskar Barnack Award, Missouri School of Journalism 'Pictures of the Year', The XI International Interpress Photo and The Women's International Democratic Federation (Germany). In 2013 Watriss received the Lifetime Achievement Award from the Houston Fine Arts Fair.
