= International Foundation for Art Research =

Non-profit organisation

- Abbreviation: IFAR
- Formation: 1969
- Type: Nonprofit organization
- Headquarters: New York, NY, United States
- Chairman: Jennifer Schipf
- Executive Director: Lindsey Schneider
- Board of directors: Warren Adelson | Lisa Dennison | Pierre DuPont | Christiane Fischer | Kate Ganz | David J. Nash | Samuel Sachs II | Steven P. Schwartz | Dorit D. Straus | Peter C. Sutton | Anthony Williams
- Revenue: $837,964 (2015)
- Expenses: $815,220 (2015)
- Website: www.ifar.org

The International Foundation for Art Research (IFAR) was a non-profit organization established to channel and coordinate scholarly and technical information about works of art. IFAR provided an administrative and legal framework within which experts can express their objective opinions. This data was made available to individuals, associations and government agencies. In September 2024, it announced that it would be winding down operations in 2025.

== History ==
Its first president was Houston industrialist John de Ménil.

Founding members of the privately funded foundation were:

- Harry Bober, New York University, Institute of Fine Arts
- Jose Lopez-Rey, NYU Institute of Fine Arts
- Lewis Goldenberg, Wildenstein & Co, New York
- Peregrine Pollen, Park-Bernet Galleries, New York
- John Rewald, University of Chicago
- Joseph Rothman, New York Attorney General, art frauds

The first Advisory council members were:

- Diego Angulo Íñiguez, Prado Museum, Madrid
- Francois Daulte, Bibliotheque des Arts, Lausanne
- Charles Durand-Ruel, Durand-Ruel Galleries, Paris
- Lloyd Goodrich, Whitney Museum, New York City
- Daniel-Henry Kahnweiler, Galerie Louise Leiris, Paris
- Lawrence Majiewski, Conservation Center, NYU Institute of Fine Arts

In 1989, IFAR had become "a very grand-sounding name for what is really just three smart, dedicated, underpaid women who are among the nation's leading experts on stolen and forged art," wrote Michael Winerip. Constance Lowenthal, Margaret I. O'Brien and Virgilia H. Pancoast worked in an Upper East Side office containing 30,000 files documenting stolen art cases. The three rooms were on the fourth floor of the Explorers Club, on East 70th Street.

== Development ==
In response to the growth and development of IFAR, museum officials have revised some policies based on an assumption that discussing theft would scare away potential donors. The change from policies of secrecy to ones which emphasize openness was gradual, mirroring an expectation that publicizing theft is likely to promote recovery.

Selected timeline

- 1998: The World Jewish Congress established the Commission for Art Recovery (CAR) to recover art taken from Jewish collectors before and during World War II. Constance Lowenthal, then executive director of the IFAR, was selected as its initial executive director.
- 1997: The United States Holocaust Memorial Museum in Washington started the Holocaust Art Restitution Project (HARP) in order to document and publish Jewish artwork which still remains missing. HARP developed and maintains an archive and database for families who have lost works and want to find them. HARP will not seek recover art.
- 1990: Artworks stolen from the Isabella Stewart Gardner Museum in Boston include Vermeer's Concert, three Rembrandts and five works by Degas.
- 1989: IFAR received reports of about 5,000 thefts.

== See also ==
- Art theft
- Art Loss Register
