= Eve Sonneman =

American photographer and artist

- Born: 1946 (age 79–80); Chicago
- Known for: Photography

Eve Sonneman (born 1946 in Chicago) is an American photographer and artist.

She did a series of similar sequences in color and black and white and for diptychs.

Obtained a BFA in painting from the University of Illinois Urbana-Champaign in 1967. Obtained a MFA from University of New Mexico in Photography in 1969.

== Exhibitions ==
- 2018 "The Arts of Eve Sonneman: Diptychs and Watercolors," Brill Gallery, North Adams, Massachusetts
- 2018 “Sonnegrams,” Nohra Haime Gallery, New York
- 2017 “New Place, New Space,” Nohra Haime Gallery, New York
- 2016 "Art from the Collection Cartier Foundation Pour l’Art Contemporain, Paris,” Cartier Mansion, New York
- 2016 “Forty: Rooms Anniversary Exhibition,” MoMA PS-1, New York

== Works ==
- Real time, 1968-1974, 1976. ISBN 9780894390081
