= Frederick C. Baldwin =

American photographer (1929–2021)

- Born: Frederick C. Baldwin; January 25, 1929; Lausanne, Switzerland
- Died: December 15, 2021 (aged 92); Houston, Texas
- Education: University of Virginia; Columbia University (BA)
- Occupations: photographer, writer
- Spouse: Wendy Watriss

Frederick C. Baldwin (January 25, 1929 – December 15, 2021) was an American photographer. He was the cofounder of FotoFest, a major photography festival in Houston, Texas. He was the husband of Wendy Watriss.

== Biography ==
Baldwin was born on Jan. 25, 1929, in Lausanne to Margaret (Gamble) Baldwin and Frederick William Baldwin, who was a career foreign service officer with the U.S. State Department and served as consul general of the U.S. embassy in Havana. He served as a Marine rifleman during the Korean War and fought in the Battle of Chosin Reservoir. Baldwin dropped out of the University of Virginia following his freshman year and graduated from Columbia University in 1956.

As a student at Columbia, he got to interview Pablo Picasso by writing a letter with his own illustrations that appealed to Picasso's sense of humor. According to Baldwin, the meeting inspired his career in photography, and he began shooting wildlife imagery for Sports Illustrated, Esquire, and National Geographic.

In 1963, Baldwin witnessed a civil rights march in Savannah, Georgia and for the next two years, he volunteered to photograph events for civil rights leader Hosea Williams.

From 1964 to 1966, Baldwin served as a Peace Corps director in Sarawak. After returning to the U.S., he turned his attention to rural poverty Georgia and South Carolina.

In 1970, Baldwin met his future wife and collaborator, Wendy Watriss, who was then a freelance photographer for Newsweek and the New York Times. The next year, Baldwin and Watriss traveled across the country to photograph and write about rural America. The couple first settled in a Texas farm, where they spent 15 years living in a 13-foot trailer for a National Endowment for the Humanities-funded photo and oral history project documenting the rural poor, resulting in a 1991 book Coming to Terms: The German Hill Country of Texas. A collection of his work is stored in the Briscoe Center for American History at the University of Texas at Austin.

In 1983, Baldwin and his wife co-founded FotoFest in Houston, an arts organization dedicated to giving visibility to photographers from the parts of the world other than Europe and North America and providing biennial exhibition opportunities for photographers beyond established museums and commercial galleries.

In 2019, Baldwin published a memoir, Dear Mr. Picasso: An Illustrated Love Affair With Freedom.

Baldwin died on December 15, 2021, at age 92.
