= Georges de Ménil =

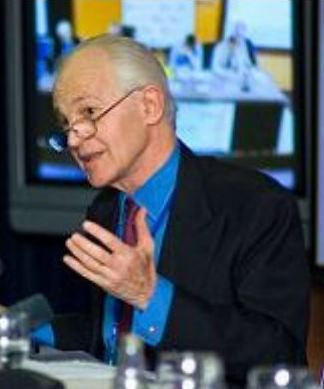
- At CASE, Centre for Social and Economic Research
- Born: December 4, 1940 (age 85); Clairac, Normandy, France

Academic background
- Education: Harvard University (BA); Massachusetts Institute of Technology (PhD)
- Doctoral advisor: Edwin Kuh

Academic work
- Discipline: Macroeconomics
- Doctoral students: Hélène Rey
- Website: Information at IDEAS / RePEc

Georges de Ménil (born December 4, 1940) is a macroeconomics policy advisor, European political commentator, and professor emeritus of economics in France and the United States.

He was Enseignant-Chercheur at l'EHESS.

== Early years ==
Educated at Phillips Exeter Academy, Harvard University (BA), and the Massachusetts Institute of Technology (PhD), he was one of the four co-authors of a 1966 historical study edited by sociologist Laurence Wiley, Chanzeaux, a village in Anjou. de Ménil’s PhD thesis focused on how wage rates are determined, and was published by MIT Press as "Bargaining: Monopoly Power vs. Union Power." It employed an economic model cited by Solow in a later work. He worked as head of the Quarterly Forecasting Model Group of the French Ministry of Finance. In 2000, he published Economic Reform in Ukraine: The Unfinished Agenda, jointly edited with Anders Aslund.

De Ménil made efforts to reform the Ukrainian and Romanian, and later the Yugoslav banking systems. In 2004 he defended the idea of a European constitution, but called into question enshrining social rights within it, a position he put forth in a book written for a Euro-sceptic French audience "Quelle Constitution pour l’Europe?". He is treasurer of the American Foundation for the Paris School of Economics.

== Subsequent career ==
In 2007 he published a book written for a lay audience looking at French social problems from the angle of American experiences: inner-city ghettos, unemployment, immigration, educational failings. The book, Common Sense: Pour débloquer la société française, makes an unpopular case (in France) in favor of affirmative action, lowering the minimum wage (known in French as the SMIC), and charging sliding-scale fees for university education. On the basis of this book, the Academy of Moral and Political Sciences at the Institut de France awarded him in 2007 a prize for an outstanding publication in the social sciences.

In January 2015, de Menil was awarded a prize from France’s Société d’Economie Politique for an article in the journal Commentaire querying the role of economists in causing the 2008 global economic crisis and urging greater prudence and humility across the social sciences. In April 2015, he was appointed one of ten external members to the division of Political Economy, Statistics and Finance of the French Académie des Sciences Morales et Politiques. In 2008, he contributed to a report published by that academy on the topic of teaching methods for economics
