= Agathe Snow =

French artist

- Born: Agathe Apparu; 1976 (age 49–50); Corsica, France
- Known for: Installation
- Notable work: No Need To Worry, The Apocalypse Has Already Happened...
- Spouse: Dash Snow (m. 2000, divorced)

Agathe Snow (French pronunciation: [aɡatə snɔ:]; née Aparru) (born 1976) is a French-born artist based in Long Island, New York. Before moving to Long Island in 2008, she lived and worked in New York City.

== Biography ==
Snow was born in Corsica and moved to New York at age 11. She did not attend art school, and initially developed her skills through experimentation, before receiving some relevant education after moving to Long Island. She works in a variety of media and has collaborated with artists including Alex Arcadia, Rita Ackermann, Michael Portnoy, and Emily Sunblad. One of her most known endeavours was No Need To Worry, The Apocalypse Has Already Happened… at the James Fuentes Gallery in 2007, in which Snow took the starting point of a recently flooded Manhattan as a conceit on which to base a five-week performance and gallery-wide installation, including a sculpture of the belly of a beached whale.

Snow married artist Dash Snow when he was 18 and she was 23 in 2000. Before Dash Snow died on 13 July 2009, according to his obituary in The New York Times, their marriage had ended in divorce.

In 2005, she staged a 24-hour dance party two blocks away from "Ground Zero" in Manhattan which brought together a group of artists from New York's downtown creative scene including Dash Snow, Ryan McGinley, Lizzi Bougatsos, and Dan Colen, among others. "I invited all of my friends," Snow told Interview magazine in 2015. "It was a sense of New York City after 9/11—we don't know what's going to happen, we're all downtown in Manhattan, we might as well have fun." In 2015, on the tenth anniversary of the original event, Snow held a 24-hour dance party at the Solomon R. Guggenheim Museum titled Stamina that featured never-before-seen video footage from the 2005 party that she had edited into a 24-hour-long video, which premiered in real-time over the duration of Stamina.

Snow's entry to the 2008 Whitney Biennial, held from 9 to 16 March at the Park Avenue Armory annex of the biennial, was "Stamina: Gloria Et Patria", a week-long dance-a-thon.

In 2019, Snow was working with Marianne Vitale on projects including "Double Vision" including paintings and drawings, some made with food items like mustard and coffee grounds.

== Selected exhibitions ==
2015

Continuum [solo exhibition], Journal Gallery, Brooklyn, New York

Stamina [color video installation; with sound, 24hrs], Solomon R. Guggenheim Museum, New York City, New York

2012

Tout Dit (2D), OHWOW, Los Angeles, California (solo exhibition)

I like it here. Don't you?, Maccarone, New York, New York (solo exhibition)
