= Dash Snow =

American artist (1981–2009)

- Born: Dashiell Alexander Whitney Snow; July 27, 1981; New York City, U.S.
- Died: July 13, 2009 (aged 27); New York City, U.S.
- Known for: Photography; Collage; Installation; Graffiti
- Spouse: Agathe Aparru (m. 2000, divorced)
- Children: 1
- Relatives: Robert Thurman (maternal grandfather); Nena von Schlebrügge (maternal Step-grandmother); Uma Thurman (aunt); Maya Hawke (cousin)

Dashiell Alexander Whitney Snow (July 27, 1981 – July 13, 2009) was an American artist based in New York City. Snow's photographs included scenes of sex, drugs, violence, and the art world; his work often depicted the decadent lifestyle of young New York City artists and their social circle.

== Early life and education ==
Dashiell Alexander Whitney Snow was born on July 27, 1981, to Taya Thurman and Christopher Snow. He grew up on the Upper West Side in New York City. Snow and his siblings, Maxwell and Caroline, are descendants of the de Menil family, who are known for their philanthropy and collection of American art.

At thirteen, he was sent to Hidden Lake Academy, a therapeutic boarding school specializing in the treatment of children with oppositional defiant disorder.

== Career ==
As a teenager, Snow began taking photographs to document the places he might not remember the next day. In the 1990s, he was a member of the IRAK graffiti crew; the name of the group was a reference to shoplifting, or racking. In order to sign his work, Snow used the tag "SACE" or "SACER".

His first solo photography exhibition took place in 2005.

In 2006, The Wall Street Journal profiled Snow and nine other emerging American artists, including Rosson Crow, Ryan Trecartin, Zane Lewis, Barney Kulok, Jordan Wolfson, and Keegan McHargue. The same year he was included in the Whitney Biennial.

In 2007, Snow and Dan Colen co-created an installation of shredded phone books in Jeffrey Deitch's SoHo gallery; the exhibit was named “Nest” or “Hamster Nest”.

In his later collage-based work, Snow used his semen as a material applied to or splashed across newspaper photographs of police officers and other authority figures.

== Family and personal life ==
Snow's parents were Christopher Snow and Taya Thurman. His maternal grandparents were Buddhist scholar Robert Thurman, the father of actress Uma Thurman, and his first wife artist Marie-Christophe de Menil. He was the great-grandson of John de Menil and Dominique de Menil, the founders of the Menil Collection and Museum located in Houston, Texas. Dominique was heiress to the Schlumberger Limited oil-equipment fortune.

At the age of 18, Snow married Corsican artist Agathe Aparru Snow; the couple later divorced.

In July 2007, his partner, Jade Berreau, gave birth to the couple's daughter, Secret Midnight Magic Nico.

== Death and legacy ==
On July 13, 2009, Snow died of a drug overdose while staying at the Lafayette House hotel in New York City. He was 27 years old.

In 2016, his family sued McDonald's after they refused to remove the tag "SACE" from the graffiti-themed interior design used in some European and Asian restaurants; the case was later dismissed.

A documentary film about Snow, Moments Like This Never Last, was released in 2020.

== Publications ==
- Slime The Boogie. Berlin/Los Angeles: Peres Projects, 2007.
- Gang bang at ground zero. New York City: self-published, 2007. Zine. Produced in collaboration with Christopher Snow.
- You Can't Drink It If It's Frozen: the Dash Snow Purple Book. 2007. Olivier Zahm, Purple Fashion Magazine, and Janvier, 2007.
- The End of Living, the Beginning of Survival. Berlin: Contemporary Fine Arts, 2007. ISBN 978-3931355425.
- I'd rather drink muddy water, and sleep in a hollow log. Self-published / Contemporary Fine Arts Berlin, 2007. OCLC 935823668. Includes "Skeletal love" by Raina Hammer.
- God Spoiled a Perfect Asshole When He Put Teeth in Yer Mouth. Berlin/Los Angeles: Peres Projects Holdings, 2007. ISBN 978-0977881994. Published on the occasion of an exhibition at Peres Projects, Los Angeles.
- Nest. New York City: Deitch Projects, 2008. With Dan Colen. ISBN 978-0977868698. Published on the occasion of an exhibition at Deitch Projects, New York City, 2007.
- In the Softest Grey Petals of the Bomb, Lay Your Finger Across my Lips. Los Angeles: Peres Projects, 2009. OCLC 549611230.
- Polaroids. Berlin/Los Angeles: Peres Projects, 2009. ISBN 978-0981765846.
- I love you, stupid!. New York City: D.A.P., 2012. ISBN 9781938922145. Cologne: Walther König, 2013. ISBN 9783863352646.
- Love Roses. New York City: Karma, 2015. ISBN 9780983730736.
- Selected Works From 2001 To 2009. Zurich: Nieves; Geneva: Innen, 2014.
  - Second edition. Zurich: Nieves; Geneva: Innen, 2020. OCLC 1220901922.

== Exhibitions ==
=== Solo exhibitions ===
- Silence is the only true friend that shall never betray you, Rivington Arms, New York City, 2006. Collages.
- Rivington Arms, New York City, 2006. Found materials, collages, sculptures and assemblages.

=== Group exhibitions ===
- USA Today, Royal Academy, London, 2006
- Whitney Biennial, Whitney Museum of American Art, New York City, 2006
- Babylon: Myth and Truth, Pergamon Museum, Berlin, 2008. Included collages by Snow.
- Exercises on Democracy, a traveling exhibition, White House Biennial, Athens, Greece, 2013–
- Materialized: New Ameriacn Video and..., Bergen Kunsthall, Norway, 2008. Included Hamsters Nest by Snow. Curated by Kathy Grayson.
- Photographs. The Royal Collection of Graphic Arts, National Gallery of Denmark, Denmark, 2010

== Collections ==
Snow's work is held in the following public collections:

- Whitney Museum of American Art, New York City
- Brooklyn Museum, New York City
- The Watermill Center

== See also ==
- 27 Club
