= Rosson Crow =

American artist

- Born: 1982 (age 43–44); Dallas, Texas, US
- Education: School of Visual Arts, Yale
- Known for: Painting

Rosson Crow (born 1982) is an American artist, best known for her large-scale paintings. She is based in Los Angeles, California.

== Biography ==
Crow grew up in Dallas, Texas. She moved to New York City in 2000 and graduated with a B.F.A, from School of Visual Arts, New York in 2004 and an M.F.A, from Yale in 2006. After discovering Crow's work in 2005, the French art dealer Nathalie Obadia organized the first exhibition of her work in France. Crow was included in the 2006 Wall Street Journal article titled "The 23-Year Old Masters," which selected ten top emerging US artists including Dash Snow, Ryan Trecartin, Zane Lewis, and Keegan McHargue.

She is known for her large-scale depictions of nostalgia-laden interiors that blend historical allusion and theatrical illusion. Her paintings are inspired by diverse references including Baroque and Rococo interior design, cowboy culture, Las Vegas architecture, theatre and music.

=== Exhibitions ===
Crow completed a residency at Cite Internationale des Arts in Paris in 2006 and has had solo exhibitions at Honor Fraser, Los Angeles; CANADA, New York, and Galerie Nathalie Obadia, Paris. She had a show at White Cube, London in January 2009 and a Focus Exhibition at the Modern Art Museum of Fort Worth, Texas in April 2009.
