= Megan Marrin =

American contemporary painter

Megan Marrin (born St. Louis, Missouri) is a New York-based painter known for her blithe, starkly represented subjects consisting of birdcages, medieval torture instruments, exercise equipment, and botanical scenes, among others.

== Education ==
Marrin received her Bachelor of Fine Arts from the School of Visual Arts, NY, and lives and works in New York, NY.

== Work ==
Occasionally Marin’s wall works take on a sculptural quality, for example by using shaped canvas, or by incorporating unconventional 3-D materials. Simpler’s Joy and Skullcap (both 2018), which picture sinuous flowering vines encased in human-shaped iron gibbets, are contoured with canvas stretched over Styrofoam. Marrin’s diptych for The Quality of Presence, curated by Dmitry Komis at the Chelsea Hotel, New York in 2012 consisted of architectural castings of window frames and screen doors. Other works, including her 2012 collaboration with Tyler Dobson, incorporate 3-D materials such as eggs and miniature toy easels.

Dobson and Marrin have presented two exhibitions together: at Renwick Gallery, New York in 2012, and later, Capitalism’s Kids (2014) at Dold Projects in St. Georgen, Germany. At Renwick Gallery their collaborative work incorporated ornithological objects such as eggs and nests, with eggs variously smashed, smeared across canvas, hollowed out, and marked up with text.

Marrin’s 2017 solo show with David Lewis Gallery followed the course of a corpse flower bloom, represented in the style of a vanitas or memento mori. “Given B-movie titles such as The Breed and The Hunger (both 2016),” wrote Zack Hatfield in Artforum, “their debt to the floral abstractions of O’Keeffe originates not in reductive Freudian readings, but in how both artists approach an individual subject from various perspectives in order to glean its essence.”

== Exhibitions ==
Marrin has exhibited internationally in two-person and group exhibitions at WIELS Contemporary Art Center, Brussels (with Elif Erkan); Svetlana, New York (with Nora Schultz); Renwick Gallery, New York (with Tyler Dobson); Galerie Max Hetzler, Berlin Office Baroque, Brussels; Mitchell Algus Gallery, NY; Bortolami Gallery, New York; Bureau, New York; Foxy Production, New York; and Rivington Arms, New York; among others.
