= Christophe Brunnquell =

French art director

Christophe Brunnquell (born 1969) is a French art director, and artist.

== Biography ==
Brunnquell was born in Neuilly-sur-Seine, France, and started working as an art director for Encore magazine after graduating from high school. After being interviewed by Olivier Zahm and Elein Fleiss for Purple magazine, they hired Brunnquell as art director from Purple's second issue in 1993. The popularity of Purple helped boosting his own career, and since then he has been working with art direction and design consultancy for, among others, Louis Vuitton, the Venice Biennale, Le Figaro's fashion guide, Fabien Baron, Colette, Balenciaga, Céline, Cosmic Wonder, and Zucca.

In 2004 Brunnquell launched Carnaval magazine, a publication mainly displaying his own art work.

Brunnquell's engagement in Purple has shifted through the years, and since the Summer 2007 issue the art direction is made by M/M Paris; though he seems to remain a part of the Purple crew – the Summer 2007 issue contained several of his monochrome paintings, and Brunnquell's artist's book Années érotiques was attached to the Spring/Summer 2008 issue. In an interview by Yasushi Fujimoto, Brunnquell explained his wish to work more or less full-time as an artist in the near future; and that his motifs are inspired by Japanese Yōkai (ghosts). The incorporation of typography in his paintings reveals his background as a graphic designer.

In 2009 he collaborated with Italian agency Studio Blanco for Carte Blanche, a capsule collection project designed for Sportmax (Max Mara Group).

Brunnquell's atelier is located in Paris' 18th arrondissement.
