= Svetlana Alpers =

American art historian (born 1936)

Svetlana Leontief Alpers (née Leontief; born February 10, 1936) is an American art historian, also a professor, writer and critic. Her specialty is Dutch Golden Age painting, a field she revolutionized with her 1983 book The Art of Describing. She has also written on Tiepolo, Rubens, Bruegel, and Velázquez, among others.

== Education and career ==
Svetlana Alpers received her B.A. from Radcliffe College in 1957 and a Ph.D.from Harvard in 1965. She was a professor of art history at the University of California, Berkeley from 1962 to 1998, and by 1994 she was named Professor Emerita.

In 1983, Alpers co-founded the interdisciplinary journal Representations with American literary critic Stephen Greenblatt.

In 2007, she collaborated with artists James Hyde and Barney Kulok on a project entitled Painting Then for Now. The project consists of 19 photographic prints based on the suite of three paintings by Giambattista Tiepolo that hang at the top of the main staircase in the Metropolitan Museum of Art, New York. The project was exhibited at David Krut Gallery, NY. Six of the prints were later acquired for the permanent collection of the Museum of Modern Art in New York City.

Alpers was elected to the American Philosophical Society in 2011. In Spring 2014, she was made an officier de l'Ordre des Arts et des Lettres by the République Francaise. On May 28, 2015, she was awarded an honorary doctorate by Harvard University.

== Critical responses ==
In a critical review of Rembrandt's Enterprise: The Studio and the Market, for conservative magazine The New Criterion, Hilton Kramer described it as an emblematic event "As far as the study of art history is concerned, and more particularly, what has gone wrong with it". He argues that it attacks Rembrandt for "having commodified himself by virtue of having painted and marketed his own self-portraits." He describes a debt to Fredric Jameson's "Postmodernism and Consumer Society", with "Professor Alpers's "Rembrandt" coming to resemble an artist like Andy Warhol, the most successful "entrepreneur of the self." He accuses Alpers of removing the greatest art categorically from the realm of aesthetics, using it as "just another counter in the dialectic of material culture. Such, too, is the dismal fate of art history when the study of art is no longer its primary concern."

== Personal life ==
Svetlana Leontief was born in Cambridge, Massachusetts. She was the only child of Wassily Leontief, a Nobel laureate economist who pioneered input-output analysis, and the poet Estelle Marks. In 1958, she married the literary scholar Paul Alpers and took his name. They later divorced.

== Honors ==
- Phi Beta Kappa
- Woodrow Wilson Fellowship, 1957-8
- Kathryn McHale Fellowship, American Association of University Women, 1961-2
- Guggenheim Fellowship, 1972-3
- Fellow, Center for Advanced Study in the Behavioral Sciences, Stanford University, 1975-6
- Fellow, American Council of Learned Societies, 1978
- Visiting Fellow, Netherlands Institute for Advanced Study (NIAS), Wassenaar, 1979
- Member, Institute for Advanced Study, Princeton, New Jersey, 1979–80
- Eugene M. Kayden Humanities Award for "The Art of Describing", 1983
- Distinguished Teaching Award, Berkeley, 1986
- Visiting Scholar, Getty Research Institute, California, 1987–88
- Director of Studies, Ecole des Hautes Etudes en Sciences Sociales, Paris, 1991
- Fellow of the American Academy of Arts and Sciences, 1991
- Fellow, Institute for Advanced Study, Berlin, 1992–93
- Honorary Doctor, Courtauld Institute of Art, London, 2009
- Visiting critic, New York University Institute of Fine Arts
- Corresponding Fellow of the British Academy, 2014
- Honorary Fellow, Royal Academy of Arts, 2014

== Selected publications ==
- The Decoration of the Torre de la Parada, Corpus Rubenianum Ludwig Burchard, Brussels/London: Phaidon, 1971. (A revision of Alpers's 1965 doctoral dissertation.)
- The Art of Describing: Dutch Art in the Seventeenth Century, Chicago: University of Chicago Press, 1983
- Rembrandt's Enterprise: The Studio and the Market, Chicago: University of Chicago Press, 1988
- "The Museum as a Way of Seeing" in Exhibiting Cultures: The Poetics and Politics of Museum Display, Washington: Smithsonian Institution Press, 1991.
- Tiepolo and the Pictorial Intelligence, New Haven and London: Yale University Press, 1994 (with Michael Baxandall)
- The Making of Rubens, New Haven and London: Yale University Press, 1995.
- The Vexations of Art: Velázquez and Others, New Haven and London: Yale University Press, 2005.
- Roof Life, New Haven and London: Yale University Press, 2013.
- Tuilages, Trocy-en-Multien: Editions de la revue Conférence, 2015. (Translated by Pierre-Emmanuel Dauzat.)
- Walker Evans: Starting from Scratch, Princeton: Princeton University Press, 2020.
- Is Art History, New York: Hunters Point Press, 2024.
