= Baldwin Lee =

American photographer (born 1951)

Baldwin Lee (born 1951) is a Chinese-American photographer and educator known for his photographs of African-American communities in the Southern United States. He has had solo exhibitions at the Chrysler Museum of Art and the Museum of Contemporary Art of Georgia, and received a Guggenheim Fellowship. His work is held in many private and public collections including the Museum of Modern Art in New York, Yale University Art Gallery, and the National Gallery of Art in Washington, DC.

== Early life and education ==
Lee was born in Brooklyn, New York in 1951. He received a BS from the Massachusetts Institute of Technology (1972) where he studied photography with Minor White, and went on to receive an MFA from Yale University (1975) where he studied with Walker Evans.

== Life and work ==
I knew that I wanted to do more work about race and poverty. This marked the first time that the content of my photographs superseded my concern for the formal structure of the rectangle. — Baldwin Lee,

In 1982, Lee became an art professor at the University of Tennessee, where he founded the university's photography program.

He then made a tour of the Deep South, covering 2,000 miles over the course of ten days. During this trip, Lee widely photographed the people, landscapes, and cities of the South. After developing his photos, he realized that he had a particular passion for the African-American communities he had interacted with. He took a longer tour of the southern United States from 1983 to 1989, producing roughly 10,000 photographs. The majority of this work focused on the lives of low-income African-Americans. When Lee arrived in a new town, he would visit the police station and let them know that he was planning to take photos with expensive photography equipment, so they could warn him about the poorer, redlined parts of town. Lee would then make a point of visiting these neighborhoods, since they had the highest concentration of Black residents. In his work, Lee strived to represent his subjects as individuals with vibrant personalities, rather than reducing them to stereotypes or emphasizing their poverty.

Lee retired from teaching in 2014, and is currently professor emeritus at the University of Tennessee.

He authored the monograph Baldwin Lee (2022), edited by Barney Kulok, which was shortlisted for the Paris Photo–Aperture Foundation Book of The Year Award in 2022.

== Recognition ==
Lee has received recognition for his contributions to American photography. The New Yorker Magazine called him "one of the great overlooked luminaries of American picture-making." Imani Perry wrote that "Lee has a sensitive eye for both poverty and dignity", describing him as "a witness to those at the bottom of U.S. stratification, and their refusal to swallow that status". In a 2015 essay in Time, photographer Mark Steinmetz wrote that Lee "produced a body of work that is among the most remarkable in American photography of the past half century".

== Publications ==
- Baldwin Lee. Hunters Point, 2022. Edited by Barney Kulok. ISBN 979-8-218-08848-4. With an essay by Casey Gerald and an interview between Lee and Jessica Bell Brown.

== Awards ==
- 1984: Guggenheim Fellowship from the John Simon Guggenheim Memorial Foundation
- 1984 and 1987: National Endowment for the Arts Fellowship

== Exhibitions ==
=== Solo exhibitions ===
- Baldwin Lee: The South in Black and White, Chrysler Museum of Art, Norfolk, Virginia, 2012
- Land Inhabited and Works of Baldwin Lee -The Do Good Fund-, Museum of Contemporary Art of Georgia, Atlanta, Georgia, 2016
- Baldwin Lee, Ogden Museum of Southern Art, New Orleans, Louisiana, 2024–2025

=== Group exhibitions ===
- Photography: Recent Acquisitions, Museum of Modern Art, New York, 1987
- Vision, Language, and Influence: Photographs of the South, Knoxville Museum of Art, Knoxville, Tennessee, 2010

== Collections ==
Lee's work is held in the following permanent collections:

- Museum of Modern Art, New York
- Yale University Art Gallery, New Haven, Connecticut
- Morgan Library & Museum, New York
- National Trust for Historic Preservation, Washington, D.C.
