= All-over painting =

Style of painting

All-over painting refers to the non-differential treatment of the surface of a work of two-dimensional art, for instance a painting. This concept is most popularly thought of as emerging in relation to the so-called "drip" paintings of Jackson Pollock and the "automatic writing" or "abstract calligraphy" of Mark Tobey in the 1950s, though the applicability of the term all-over painting would be wider than that. "All-over painting" is not a formal style of painting and the term does not represent an "art movement." Some painting under the heading color field painting displays the "all-over" painting style. Such a painting would fail to treat the top, for instance, differently from the bottom; the left than the right. Uniform treatment of all sections of the surface are the hallmark of all-over painting. All-over paintings would lack a dominant point of interest, or any indication of which way is "up." Some paintings by Cy Twombly have had this term applied to them.

Clement Greenberg cited Janet Sobel's as the first instance of all-over painting he had seen.

== See also ==
- Action painting
