= Office Baroque =

Belgian art museum

Coordinates: 50.848406°N 4.343225°E

Office Baroque is a Belgian contemporary art gallery situated in Antwerp. The gallery was originally incorporated in 2007 in an apartment on Harmoniestraat in Antwerp by Marie Denkens and Wim Peeters. The gallery occupied a location on Lange Kievitstraat in Antwerp from 2008 till 2013. It opened its first gallery in Brussels on 7 November 2013 with an exhibition by French/American artist Michel Auder. In a 1909 cast-iron building by the Brussels architect Paul Hamesse, he was part of the Art Nouveau generation. In September 2015, Office Baroque opened a second gallery space in the vicinity of the Centre for Fine Arts, Brussels. In September 2020, the gallery relocated to its original space on Harmoniestraat in Antwerp. The gallery is named after one of Gordon Matta-Clark’s public interventions, untimely demolished after extensive protests in Antwerp in 1980.

The gallery has represented American, Asian and European artists and has produced both exhibitions and publications. Office Baroque presents exhibitions at international art fairs such as Frieze Art Fair, London; FIAC, Paris; Art Basel, Miami Beach; Independent, New York.

== Gallery artists ==
- Michel Auder
- Matthew Brannon
- Sascha Braunig
- Neil Campbell
- Mathew Cerletty
- Catharine Czudej
- Alexandre da Cunha
- David Diao
- Keith Farquhar
- Robin Graubard
- Christopher Knowles
- Owen Land
- Leigh Ledare
- Junko Oki
- Tyson Reeder
- Michael Rey
- Davis Rhodes
- Margaret Salmon
- Ataru Sato
- Daniel Sinsel
- Rezi van Lankveld
- B. Wurtz
