= Lu Chao (artist) =

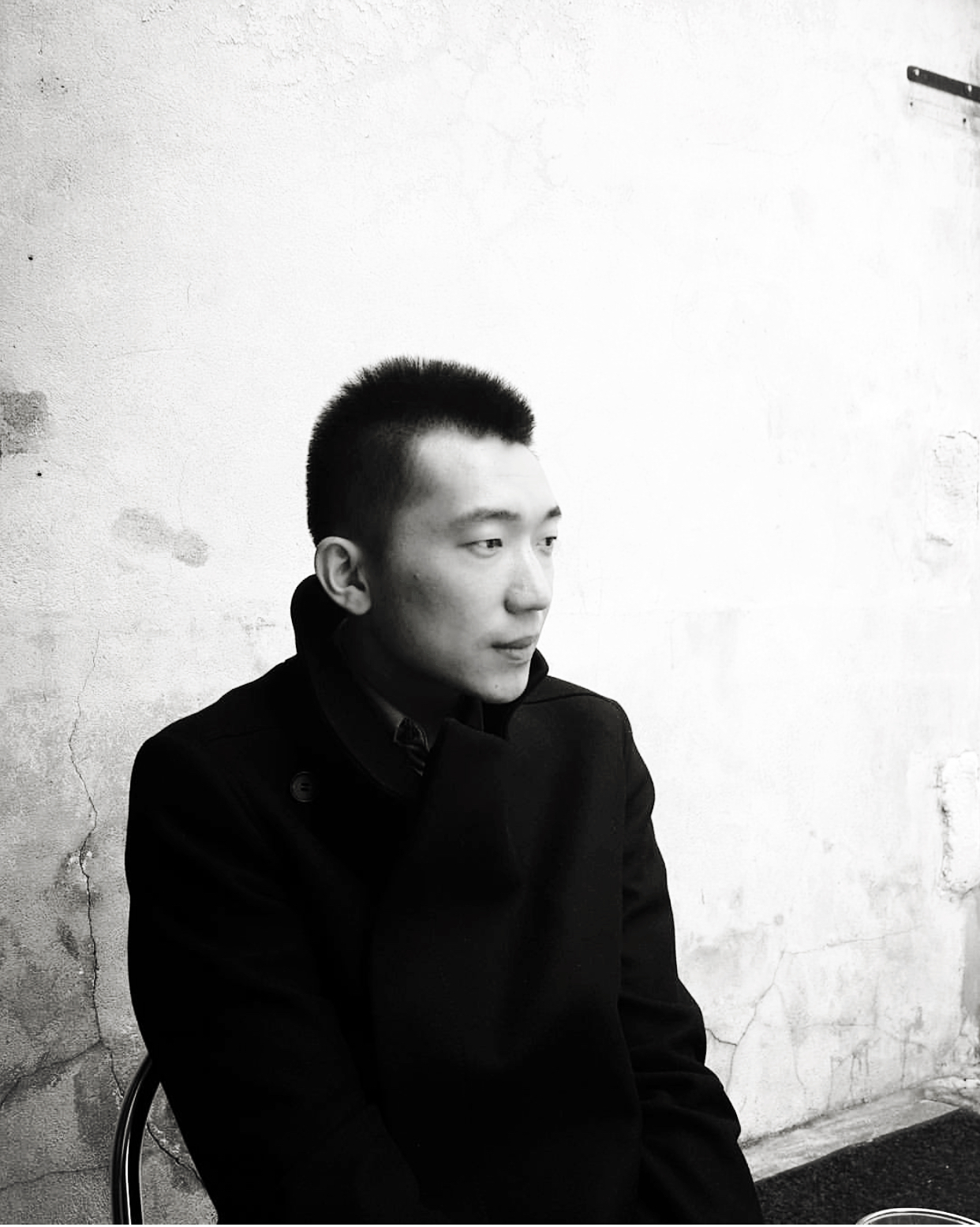
Lu Chao

Lu Chao (Chinese: 陆超) was born in 1988 in Shenyang, China. The artist currently lives and works between London and Beijing.

Lu Chao's paintings are mostly filled with sketch-like portrayals of a massive number of different faces, evoking a sense of mystery and strangeness. For the artist, the unknown is sublime and he avoids using his work as a carrier for opinions, preferring to leave the door open for viewers to interpret the pieces on their own. He aim to establish an exchange between viewers and the larger universe around them by integrating an expanding world into his own labyrinth of personalized patterns. Through his works, Lu Chao exposes us to the unknown and strangeness of our life, of our world and of our state of mind. We find it difficult to truly understand our own persona, and we find it even more exhausting to comprehend the world around us. The gap between what we do and what we do not know, shapes the beauty and excitements of life.

== Education background ==
Lu Chao completed his Masters at the Painting Department of the Royal College of Art (London, UK) in 2014 and finished his Bachelor at the Central Academy of Fine Arts (Beijing, China) oil painting department in 2012. He also attended Fine Arts School Affiliated to China Central Academy of Fine Arts and graduated in 2008.

== Solo exhibition ==
2017

Black Silence, Rosenfeld Porcini Gallery, London, UK

Black Box, Hadrien de Montferrand Gallery, Beijing, China

2016

Black Light, Nathalie Obadia Galerie, Paris, France

2015

Black Mirror, Art Basel, Hadrien de Montferrand Gallery, Hong Kong, China

2013

Black Forest, Hadrien de Montferrand Gallery, Beijing, China

== Awards ==
2018

Forbes China 30 under 30 in Art and Fashion

2014

Painter—Stainers Gordon Luton Award, Royal College of Art, London, UK

Saatchi New Sensations Nominate Exhibition, Solo Award Runners Up, London, UK

RCA Studio Prize, London, UK

2013

Lucy Halford Bursary, Royal College of Art, London, UK

2012

Best Creative Awards, Central Academy of Fine Art, Beijing, China

2011

Excellent Sketching Award, Central Academy of Fine Art, Beijing, China

2010

Silver Prize, Giant Cup Today National Art Students Awards, Today Art Museum, Beijing, China

== Selected museum and public collections ==
- Sammlung Wemhoner Collection
- Foundation Louis Vuitton
- Ghisla Art Collection
- Today Art Museum Beijing
- China Central Academy of Fine art
- Fine Art School Affiliated to Central Academy of Fine Arts
