= Shirley Jaffe (artist) =

American painter (1923–2016)

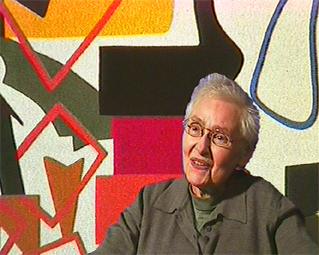
- Jaffe in 1998
- Born: Shirley Sternstein; October 2, 1923; Elizabeth, New Jersey, U.S.
- Died: September 29, 2016 (aged 92); Louveciennes, France
- Known for: Abstract expressionism; geometric art
- Spouse: Irving Jaffe

Shirley Jaffe (née Sternstein, October 2, 1923 – September 29, 2016) was an American abstract painter. Her early work is of the gestural abstract expressionist style, however in the late 1960s she changed to a more geometric style. This change was initially received with caution by the art world, but later in her career she was praised for the "idiosyncratic" and individual nature of her work. She spent most of her life living and working in France.

== Early life ==
Jaffe was born in Elizabeth, New Jersey, into a Jewish family, her parents were Benjamin and Anna (née Levine) Sternstein. Jaffe had two siblings by the name of Jerry and Elaine. Her father ran a shirt factory; however he died when Jaffe was 10. Her mother moved the family to Brighton Beach, Brooklyn, and Jaffe attended Abraham Lincoln High School. She then studied fine art at Cooper Union in New York City, earning a certificate in 1945.

After completing her degree, Jaffe worked initially in the print department of the New York Public Library and also worked for the department store Macy's drawing fashion sketches for the advertising department.

After her marriage, she lived in Washington, D.C., for a period of time, attending the Phillips Art School there, then moved to Paris when her husband was transferred there in 1949. She became part of a circle of ex-pat American artists which included Sam Francis, Ellsworth Kelly and Joan Mitchell.^{[5]} Francis introduced Jaffe to his dealer, Jean Fournier, who became interested in Jaffe's work and began showing her art in his gallery.

== Career ==
=== Style ===
Jaffe began as an abstract expressionist, using gesture in her painting in a similar way to Joan Mitchell. In 1963, however, a grant from the Ford Foundation funded her to spend a year in Berlin. This study break took her away from the circle of artist friends she had developed in Paris and exposed her to new influences such as the music of contemporary composers Iannis Xenakis and Karlheinz Stockhausen. It may also have reunited her thinking with the European abstraction of Jean Arp, Sophie Taeuber-Arp, Wassily Kandinsky and Auguste Herbin. "It [my style of painting] changed when I went to Berlin," Jaffe said later. "I had a feeling that my paintings were being read as landscapes, which was not my intention. I felt I had to clear out the woods."

It was no coincidence that Jaffe was awarded the Ford Foundation grant in 1963 due to the political climate that was engulfing the world, not to mention especially in Berlin. "The Wall had just been built, it was the moment of Kennedy's death. We were very marked by that wall, by the situation in Berlin, in the world." The Ford Foundation artist-in-residence grants, which in 1964 merged with the German Academic Exchange Service program, were originally intended, like many other American funded cultural initiatives, to counter Soviet cultural influences. During this time it is said that Jaffe's style had taken a change and her art had portrayed her experiences in the split city of Berlin.

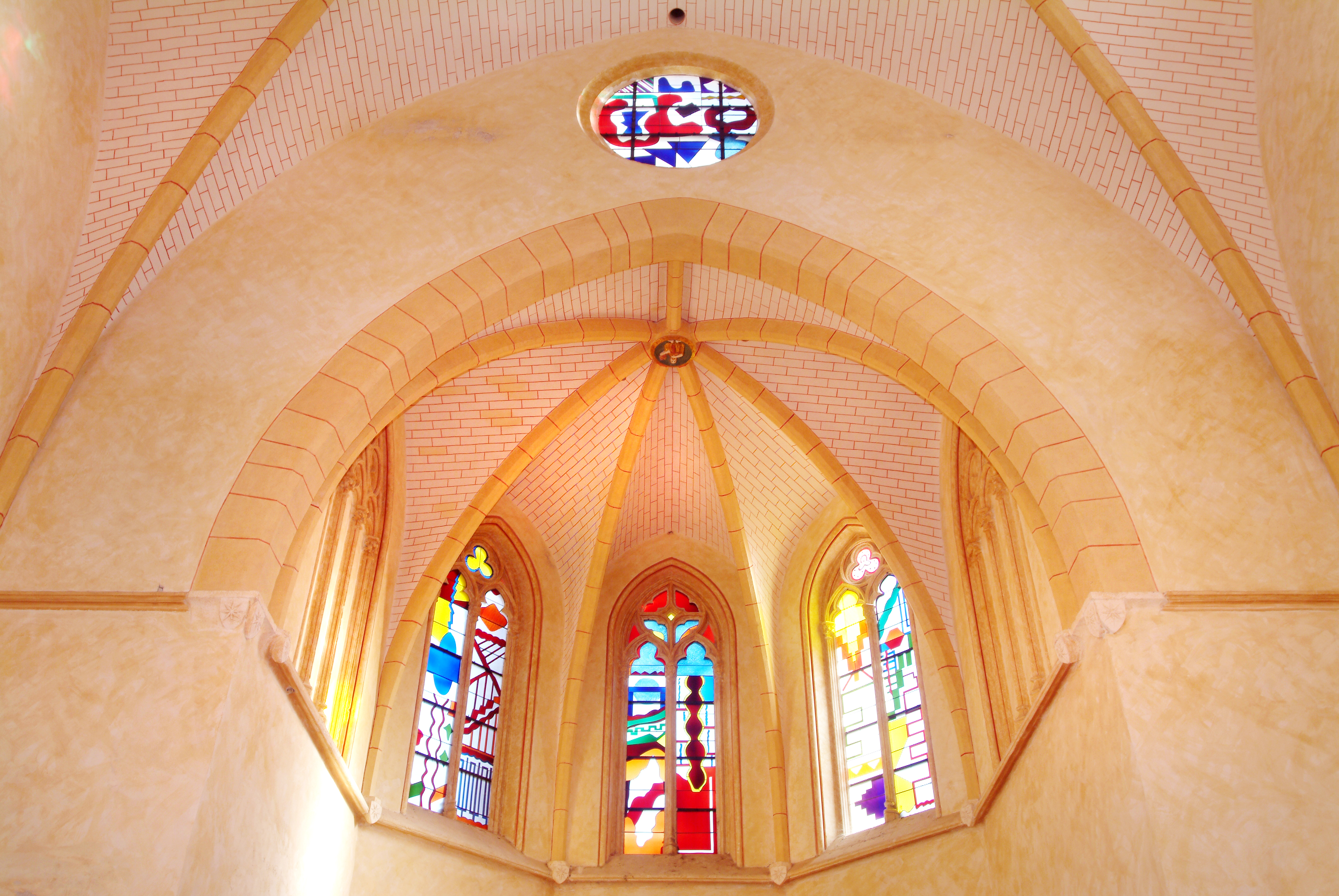
Stained glass windows designed by Jaffe for the Chapelle La Funeraria, Perpignan

Jaffe's new style featured flat, uninflected surfaces, single-colour shapes and predominantly straight, rather than curved, lines. On her return to Paris, both her dealer Fournier and her artist friends were "shocked" at the change; however, Fournier continued to exhibit her work in his gallery. Later analyses of her work note that Jaffe's style moved in a "different direction" from other painters of her time, and was characterised by "an incredible vitality of form and complexity". The evolution of her style, which happened gradually over a period of decades, was described by critics as an "internal development" apparently unrelated to contemporary trends, and therefore she could not be seen as a part of any particular art movement.

=== Exhibitions ===
Although Jaffe began exhibiting in solo shows in France in the early 1960s, her first solo exhibition took place in Bern, Switzerland in 1962. It was shortly after that she truly settled into the Parisian art scene and lifestyle. American galleries only began to show her work from the 1990s, years later from her earlier works. This delay has been attributed to the critical response of other artists to the change in her painting style in the 1960s. Overall, she had at least 25 exhibitions in the two countries; in the United States at the Holly Solomon Gallery, the Tibor de Nagy Gallery, the San Francisco Museum of Modern Art and the Museum of Modern Art in New York (MoMA) and in France at the Galerie Fournier, the Centre Georges Pompidou and the Nathalie Obadia Gallery. Jaffe's art displayed in the MoMA in New York City was one of a different style of painting. It was a portrait of her younger sister which was originally a gift to her when she was only fourteen years old.

Her work is held in the collections of the Centre Pompidou, the San Francisco Museum of Modern Art, the Cartier Foundation for Contemporary Art (Paris) and the Berado Collection Museum (Lisbon).

In 2000, the state government and the City of Perpignan commissioned Jaffe to design nine stained glass windows for the city's chapel. The installation of the completed windows coincided with a retrospective of Jaffe's work at the Musée d'Art Moderne in Céret.

Jaffe's work was included in the 2021 exhibition Women in Abstraction at the Centre Pompidou.

Shirley Jaffe was the subject of a major solo exhibition touring the Centre Pompidou (2022), the Kunstmuseum Basel (2023), and the Musée Matisse in Nice (2023/24), reflecting renewed institutional recognition of her work within the postwar abstract art scene.

=== Foundation ===
In 2025, descendants of the artist established the Shirley Jaffe Foundation, dedicated to the preservation, research, publication, and dissemination of her artistic work. The Foundation has initiatied a catalogue raisonné project to comprehensively document her oeuvre.

== Personal life and death ==
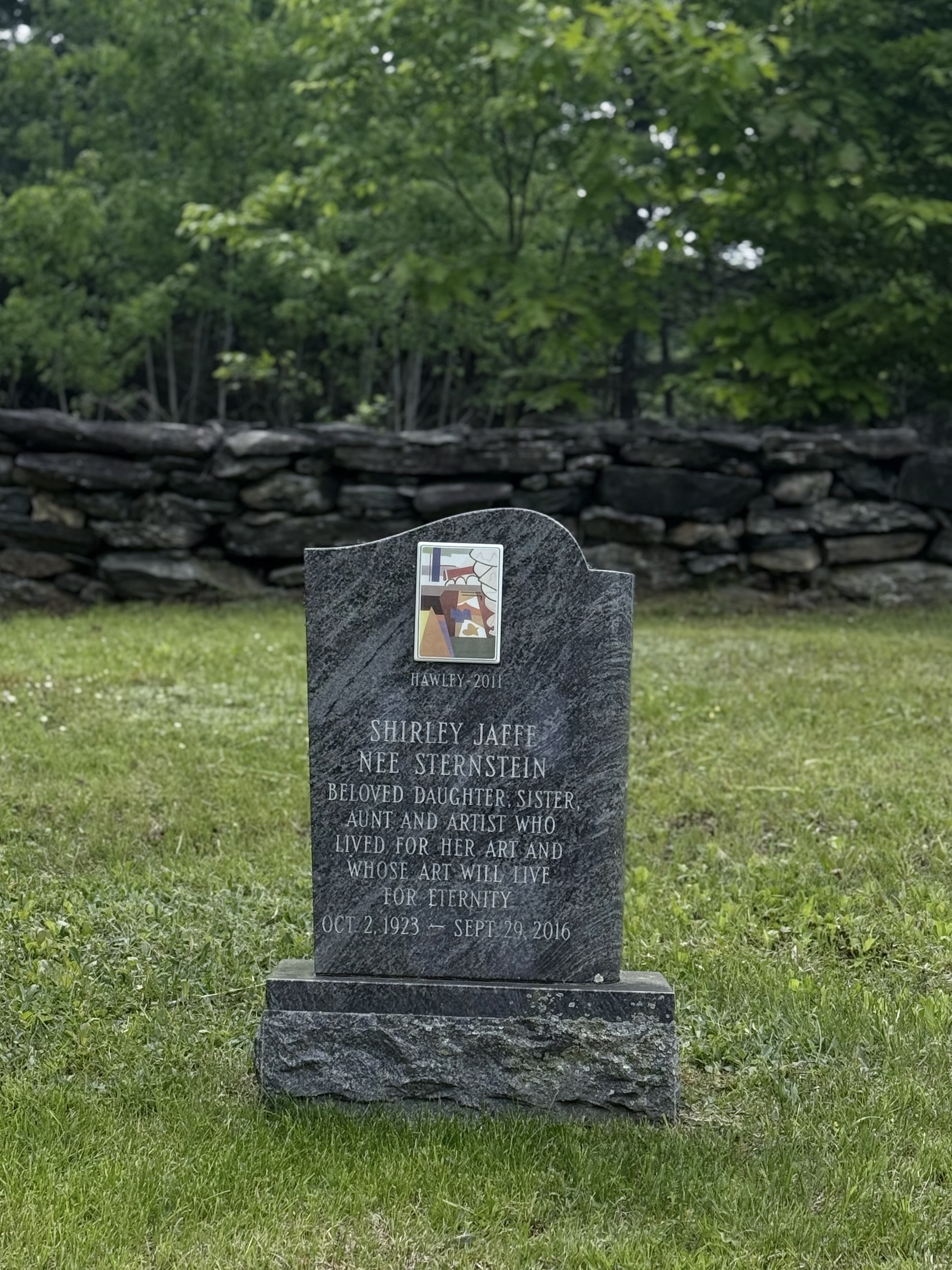
Tombstone of Shirley Jaffe in Massachusetts

Her husband, Irving Jaffe, was the White House correspondent for Agence France-Presse in the 1940s. They moved to Paris together when Irving was transferred to the Paris office of the news agency. The couple divorced in 1962.

Jaffe died at Louveciennes, France, on September 29, 2016, at the age of 92, three days before her 93rd birthday.
