= Edgar Arceneaux =

American visual artist

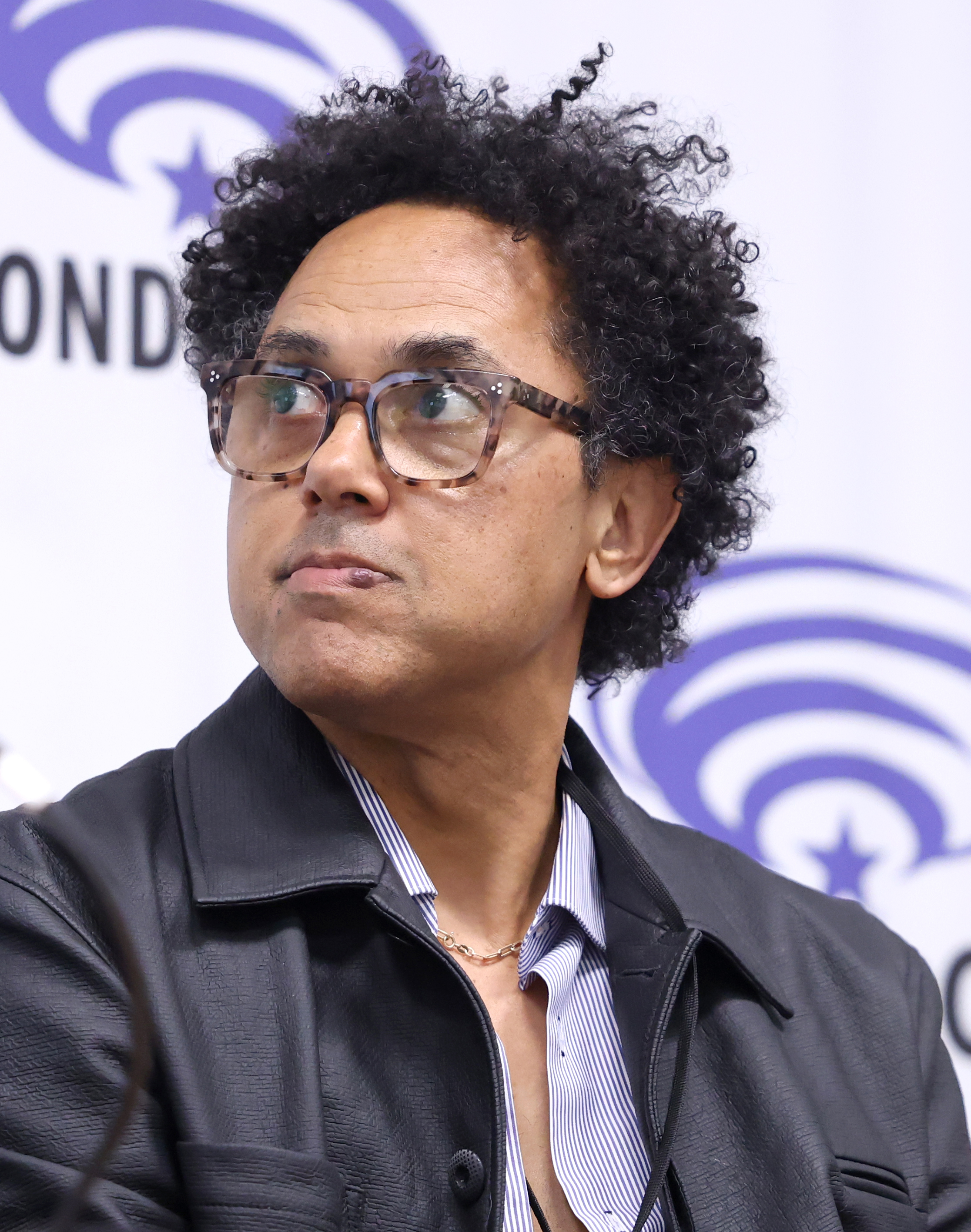
- Arceneaux in 2025
- Born: 1972 (age 53–54); Los Angeles, California
- Education: California Institute of the Arts

Edgar Arceneaux (born 1972 in Los Angeles) is a contemporary artist who lives and works in Los Angeles, California. He is a drawing artist. He is the co-founder of the Watts House Project, a non-profit neighborhood redevelopment organization in Watts.

== Career ==
Arceneaux received his BFA from Art Center College of Design in 1996 and his MFA from the California Institute of the Arts in 2001 after attending the Skowhegan School of Painting and Sculpture in 1999 and the Fachhochschule Aachen, Germany, in 2000 and 2001.

He was the director of the Watts House Project from 1999 to 2012, and officially re-launched the organization in 2007 with Sue Bell Yank through the support of the Hammer Museum's Artist Residency program, as well as a team of Watts residents, artists, community organizers, and scholars. The Watts House Project focuses on renovating residential properties and providing programs and venues for community involvement in the neighborhood around the historic Watts Towers. The organization undertook its first remodeling projects in 2008 and was granted nonprofit status in 2009.

In November 2003, the UCLA Hammer Museum exhibited Arceneaux's Drawings of Removal, an installation that combined layered wall drawings, sculptural ephemera, and a makeshift studio in "an ongoing exploration of memory through the medium of drawing". In 2025, Arceneaux's work Skinning the Mirror (Summer 1), was acquired as a part of a new initiative spearheaded by Jarl Mohn.

He was named a United States Artists Fellow in 2007, and was included the 2008 Whitney Biennial.

In 2015 Arceneaux created Until, Until, Until..., a performance piece recreating and commenting on Ben Vereen's controversial blackface performance at the 1981 inauguration of Ronald Reagan. Originally commissioned for Performa 15, he has since toured with the piece.

Arceneaux is also an associate professor of Art for Roski School of Art and Design at USC; he lives and works in Pasadena, California.

== Exhibitions ==
Arceneaux's work has been exhibited at galleries and museums both nationally and internationally, including the Museum of Contemporary Art, Los Angeles, the Orange County Museum of Art, the San Francisco Museum of Modern Art, the Studio Museum in Harlem, The Kitchen, New York, the Kunstmuseum Basel, Switzerland, the Lentos Art Museum, Austria, the Hammer Museum, Los Angeles, the Whitney Museum of American Art and the Museum Ludwig in Germany. He is represented by Susanne Vielmetter Los Angeles Projects in Los Angeles and Nathalie Obadia in Paris.
