= Marianne Vitale =

American artist

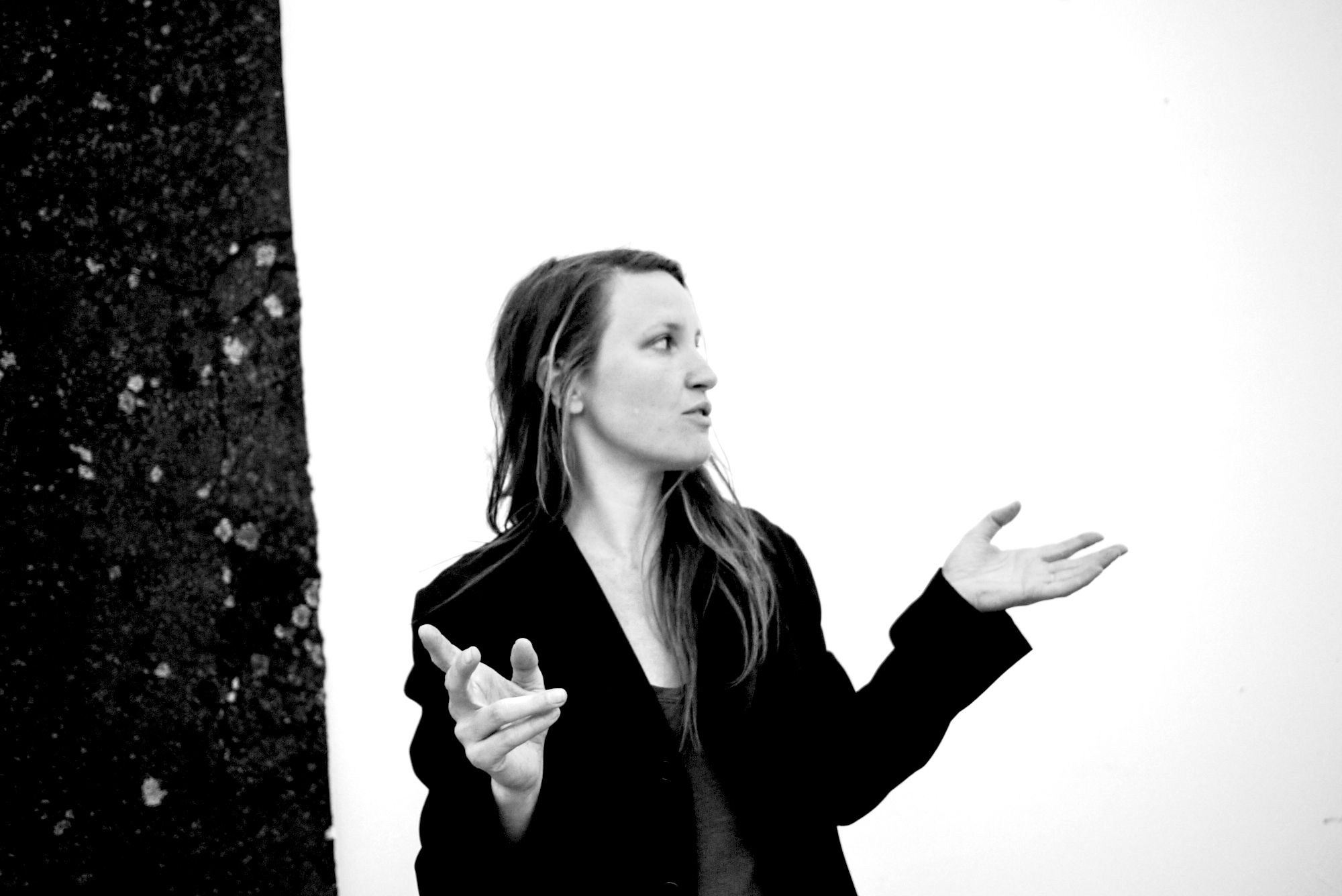
- Born: 1973 (age 52–53); East Rockaway, New York, US
- Education: The School of Visual Arts
- Known for: Sculpture

Marianne Vitale (born 1973) is an American artist living and working in New York City.

== Career ==
Vitale graduated from The School of Visual Arts in 1996 with a BFA in Film.

== Exhibitions ==
For the 2010 Whitney Biennial, Vitale exhibited the video Patron. Peter Schjeldahl of The New Yorker wrote: "The most prepossessing is an energetic performance by...Vitale, who...harangues 'patrons' with colorfully worded...insults and commands. The provoked notion of contemporary art as an arena of sadomasochism is just cogent enough to chill, a trifle."

Vitale's ongoing sculptural series of Burned Bridges has been part of several solo gallery and museum exhibitions including What I Need to Do Is Lighten The Fuck Up About A Lot of Shit at Zach Feuer; Bright Dark Future at Le Confort Moderne; If You Expect To Rate as a Gentleman, Do Not Expectorate On the Floor at Unge Kunstneres Samfund; Lost Marbles at Le Marbrerie, Montreuil; and Huey, Dewey & Louie at Kunstraum Innsbruck.

Her solo show, Diamond Crossing at Zach Feuer (2013), was applauded by the New York Times' Ken Johnson as “approaching a near-perfect 10…occupy[ing] the space with awesome implacability…[and] art-historical sophistication.”

For the Performa '13 Biennial, Vitale was commissioned to produce The Missing Book of Spurs, a performance set in a "saloon/[brothel]/weather station."

Other venues that have exhibited Vitale's work include Venus Over Los Angeles, The Contemporary Austin, The Journal Gallery, Karma, Various Small Fires, the Elaine de Kooning House, the Rubell Family Collection, Kling & Bang, White Columns, Brooklyn Museum, Contemporary Fine Arts Berlin, Mosquito Coast Factory and Contemporary Art Centre Vilnius.

From April 2014 through March 2015, Vitale's outdoor sculptural exhibition Common Crossings was presented on the High Line in New York City, curated by Cecilia Alemani.

In 2019 the city of Savenay, France commissioned Vitale to create Worthies, a public, permanent installation. On this occasion, a book entitled The World, the Flesh and the Devil was published by American Art Catalogues. Also in 2019 Vitale was working with Agathe Snow on projects including "Double Vision" including paintings and drawings, some made with food items like mustard and coffee grounds.
