= Hidden Lake Academy =

Defunct therapeutic boarding school in Georgia, United States

Coordinates: 34°37′42″N 84°04′16″W

Location
- 830 Hidden Lake Rd. Dahlonega, Lumpkin County, Georgia 30533

Information
- Other name: Ridge Creek School
- Established: 1994
- Closed: 2011
- Age range: 13 to 18
- Capacity: 150
- Campus size: 215 acres
- Tuition: $6000 per month

Hidden Lake Academy was a therapeutic boarding school in Dahlonega, Georgia, United States, in operation from 1994 until 2011. In 2006, it was the subject of legal action over accreditation. The school filed bankruptcy in 2009 and shut down in 2011.

== History ==
The school was founded in 1994 by Dr. Leonard Buccelatto in Dahlonega, Georgia. It was intended to "fill the need for a specialty school to fill the gap between services of residential treatment centers and traditional boarding schools."

A federal class action lawsuit against the school by a group of parents was filed in 2006. Although denied class action status, the parties settled out of court for $400,000. The lawsuit caused a drop in student enrollments and cost the school $1.5 million in legal fees. This, combined with the impact of a poor economy, led the school to file for bankruptcy under Chapter 11 in 2009.

After the bankruptcy hearing, the school was renamed "Ridge Creek School". In 2011, a disturbance occurred in which multiple students tried to leave the school. This resulted in the Lumpkin County Sheriff's Office being called out to the scene. The school closed later that year.

== About the program ==
New students had typically struggled with homework, depression, anger management, or various addictions. Some students were from outside the United States. The student population ranged from 15 to 200. Hidden Lake Academy was accredited by the Southern Association of Colleges and Schools (SACS), the Southern Association of Independent Schools (SAIS), and the Georgia Accreditation Commission (GAC).

== Notable alumni ==
- Dash Snow, artist
