= Purple (magazine) =

French fashion, art and culture magazine

- Fall/Winter 2011/2012 cover
- Editor-in-chief: Olivier Zahm
- Categories: Fashion, Art, Culture
- Frequency: Biannual
- Founded: 1992 (Purple Prose); 1995 (old version); 2004 (new version)
- Company: Purple Institute
- Country: France
- Language: English, French
- Website: purple.fr
- ISSN: 1766-8832

Purple
- Editors-in-chief: Elein Fleiss and Sébastien Jamain
- Categories: Art, Culture
- Frequency: Quarterly
- Founded: 2004
- Company: Les Editions Purple
- Country: France
- Based in: Paris
- Language: English, French
- Website: purple.fr
- ISSN: 1766-8840

Purple is a French fashion, art and culture magazine founded in 1992.

== History ==
In 1992, Elein Fleiss and Olivier Zahm started the magazine Purple Prose as a reaction against the superficial glamour of the 1980s; much as a part of the global counterculture at the time, inspired by magazines like Interview, Ray Gun, Nova, and Helmut Newton's Illustrated, but with the aesthetics of what usually is referred to as anti-fashion. Based on their personal interests and views; Purple was, and in a sense still is, made much in the same spirit of the fanzine.

When Fleiss left the magazine in 2002, Zahm put a growing emphasis on Purple becoming a fashion magazine, a more sustainable business model. The magazine became associated with the "realism" of the new fashion photography of the 1990s, with names like Juergen Teller, Terry Richardson, Wolfgang Tillmans, and Mario Sorrenti and closely associated with the zeitgeist of the time featuring 90s style icon Chloë Sevigny in almost every issue.

In the introduction of the Purple Anthology, Zahm writes:

[...] We launched Purple Prose in the early 1990s without any means, and without any experience, because we wanted to make a magazine that was radically different. We wanted to support the artists around us that no one else supported, much less talked about. [...] It would be a form of opposition of our own, different from the critical jargon of the generation of '68. [...] From a visual standpoint, we represented the break from '80s imagery (like Richard Avedon's photography for Versace, for example). From an artistic standpoint, the artists of the early '90s were rising up against art as capital fetish. [...] In saying that Purple is the portrait of a generation, I mean it's a portrait of those who embody their times. At the same time, it's a portrait of myself and Elein Fleiss, our ideas, our lives, and our aesthetics.

In 2004, it was divided into Purple Fashion, published by Purple Institute based in Paris and New York, and Purple Journal, published by Les Editions Purple, based in Paris. On February 16 the first installation of Purple Fashion's new web site was launched.

The art director of Purple Prose and Purple Fashion was Christophe Brunnquell until 2006, when he was succeeded by M/M Paris.

=== Offspring publications ===
Fleiss and Zahm's collaboration has resulted in many side projects:

- Purple Prose – published from October 1992 to winter 1998 (13 issues).
- Purple Fiction – a literary magazine published between 1995 and 1998 (4 issues).
- Purple Fashion – published between 1995–1998 (4 issues), and 2004–present.
- Purple Sexe – a magazine devoted to sexuality, published between winter 1998 and 2001 (8 issues). The magazine was reborn as a one-off appendix for Purple Fashion Fall/Winter 2008/09, dedicated to Italian porn star Rocco Siffredi.
- Purple – a fusion of Purple Prose, Purple Fiction, Purple Fashion, and Purple Sexe; published between summer 1998 and 2003 (16 issues).
- Purple Books – a publishing house (1998–2001)
- Purple Gallery – a Parisian art gallery
- Purple Journal – a cultural magazine published 2004–present in a French and an English version.

Since 2004, Purple is divided in two different publications; Purple Fashion magazine (edited by Zahm and published by Purple Institute) and Purple Journal (edited by Fleiss and Sébastien Jamain, published by Les Editions Purple).

=== Purple Fashion's artist's books ===
Since its second issue, each number of Purple Fashion comes with an artist's book:

- No. 2 – Terry Richardson: Terry
- No. 3 – Richard Prince: The Hippie drawings
- No. 4 – Hedi Slimane: Interzone
- No. 5 – Juergen Teller: Ed in Japan
- No. 6 – Rita Ackermann: Good morning New York
- No. 7 – Helmut Lang: Selective memory series
- No. 8 – Dash Snow: You can't drink it if it's frozen
- No. 9 – Christophe Brunnquell: Annees Erotiques
- No. 10 – Harmony Korine: Pigxtras
- No. 11 – Marlene Marino: Cuba 2009
- No. 12 – Ari Marcopoulos: Debris
- No. 13 – Aurel Schmidt: Pussy
- No. 14 – Vincent Darré: Vincent
- No. 15 – Thurston Moore: Street Mouth
- No. 16 – Katja Rahlwes: Full Moon
- No. 17 – Richard Prince: Purple 20 Years, The Richard Prince Purple Book
- No. 18 –
- No. 19 – Ryan McGinley: The Journey is the Destination
