= Nathalie Obadia =

French art gallery owner (born 1962)

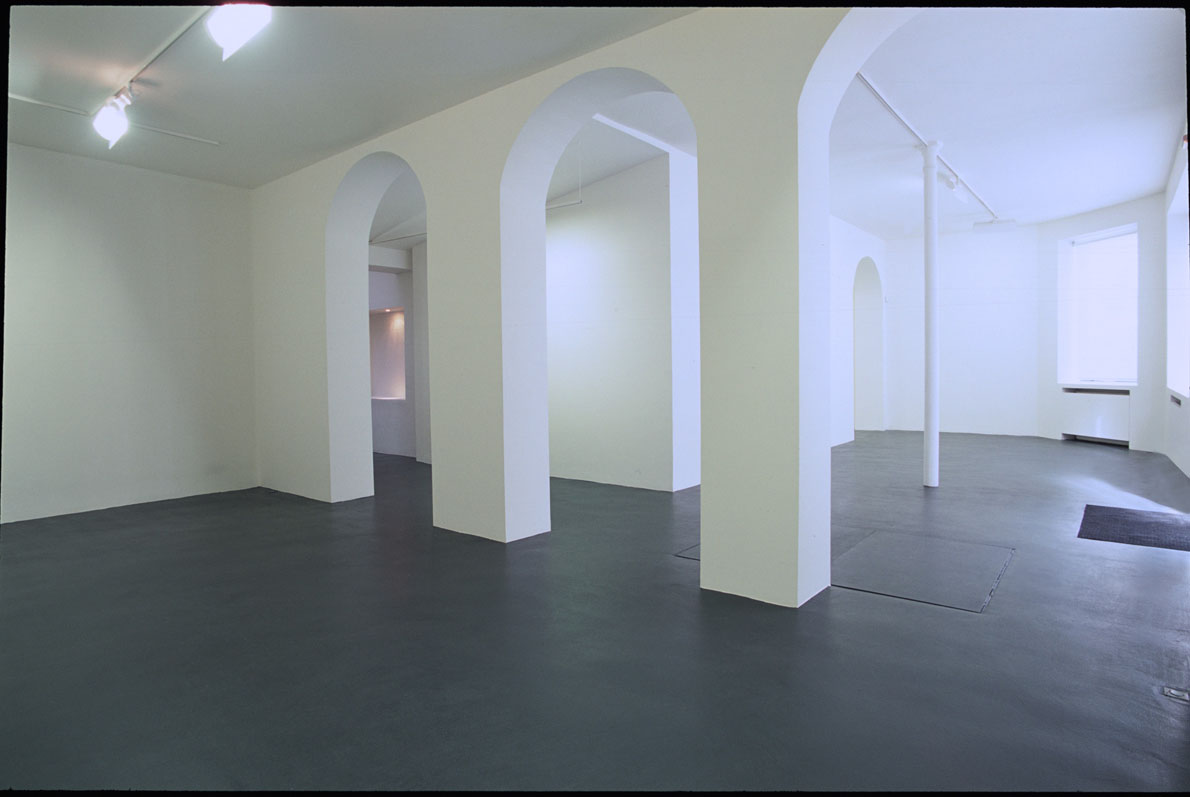
Galerie Nathalie Obadia in Paris

Nathalie Obadia (born 14 March 1962) is a French art gallery owner. She specialises in contemporary art.

== Early life ==
She was born in Toulouse, France. As a teenager, Nathalie Obadia completed an internship at Daniel Varenne, in Genova, and Adrien Maeght, in Paris. She studied a master's degree in Law at the Paris Institute of Political Studies, then worked at the Galerie Daniel Templon from 1988 to 1992.

== Career ==
She opened her first gallery in 1993, in Marais in Paris. The gallery included work by a generation of French artists, including Carole Benzaken (Prix Marcel Duchamp, 2004), Valérie Favre and Pascal Pinaud. Later the gallery expanded to include international artists, including Jessica Stockholder, Albert Oehlen, Fiona Rae and Manuel Ocampo.

In 1995, Nathalie Obadia opened a larger gallery near the Pompidou Centre in Paris that moved to its current address in 2003.

From 2005 to 2008 she was vice president of the 'Comité professionnel des galeries d'art (CPGA)', a French association that aims to represent French art galleries to public authorities.

She opened a new space in 2013.

Obadia teaches a class on 'Analysis of the Contemporary Art Market' at the Paris Institute of Political Studies (Sciences Po, Paris).

== Honours ==
- Officer of the Order of Arts and Letters
- Knight of the National Order of Merit

== Represented artists ==
- Brook Andrew
- Edgar Arceneaux
- Barry X Ball
- Rina Banerjee
- Valérie Belin
- Rosson Crow
- Luc Delahaye
- Shirley Jaffe
- Seydou Keïta
- Lu Chao
- Youssef Nabil
- Manuel Ocampo
- Chloe Piene
- Laure Prouvost
- Fiona Rae
- Mithu Sen
- Andres Serrano
- Lorna Simpson
- Mickalene Thomas
- Nicola Tyson
- Agnès Varda
- Brenna Youngblood
- Xu Zhen by MadeIn Company
