= Representations =

- Discipline: Humanities
- Language: English
- Edited by: Ian Duncan, David Henkin

Publication details
- History: 1983–present
- Publisher: University of California Press (United States)
- Frequency: Quarterly

Standard abbreviations
- ISO 4: Representations

Indexing
- CODEN: RPREEL
- ISSN: 0734-6018 (print); 1533-855X (web)
- LCCN: 83644038
- OCLC no.: 08781433

Links
- Journal homepage; Online access; Online archive

Representations is an interdisciplinary journal in the humanities published quarterly by the University of California Press. The journal was established in 1983 and is the founding publication of the New Historicism movement of the 1980s. It covers topics including literary, historical, and cultural studies. The founding editorial board was chaired by Stephen Greenblatt and Svetlana Alpers. Representations frequently publishes thematic special issues, for example, the 2007 issue on the legacies of American Orientalism, the 2006 issue on cross-cultural mimesis, and the 2005 issue on political and intellectual redress.

== Anthologies ==
The UC Press Representations books series has collected and reprinted many essays originally published in the journal, including:

- The Making of the Modern Body: Sexuality and Society in the Nineteenth Century, edited by Catherine Gallagher and Thomas Laqueur
- Representing the English Renaissance, edited by Stephen Greenblatt
- Misogyny, Misandry, Misanthropy, edited by R. Howard Bloch and Frances Ferguson
- Law and the Order of Culture, edited by Robert Post
- The New American Studies: Essays from Representations, edited by Philip Fisher
- New World Encounters, edited by Stephen Greenblatt
- Future Libraries, edited by R. Howard Bloch and Carla Hesse
- The Fate of "Culture": Geertz and Beyond, edited by Sherry B. Ortner
