= Ryan McGinley =

American photographer (born 1977)

- Born: October 17, 1977 (age 49); Ramsey, New Jersey, U.S.
- Known for: Photography
- Website: ryanmcginley.com

Ryan McGinley (born October 17, 1977) is an American photographer and lives in New York City. He began taking photographs in 1998. In 2003, at the age of 25, he was one of the youngest artists to have a solo show at the Whitney Museum of American Art. He was named Photographer of the Year in 2003 by American Photo Magazine. In 2007, he was given the Young Photographer Infinity Award by the International Center of Photography. In 2009, he was honored at The Young Collectors Council's Artists Ball at the Guggenheim Museum. A 2014 GQ article declared McGinley, "the most important photographer in America."

== Early life and education ==
McGinley was born in Ramsey, New Jersey and is the youngest of eight children. From an early age his peers and mentors were skateboarders, graffiti artists, musicians, and artists who were considered to be on the fringes of society. As a teenager, McGinley was a snowboard instructor at Campgaw Mountain, New Jersey and competed in the east coast amateur circuits from 1992 to 1995. He enrolled as a graphic design student at Parsons School of Design in New York in 1997. In 1998, he moved to the East Village, and covered the walls of his apartment with Polaroid pictures of everyone who visited there.

In 1998, McGinley came out as gay, sharing that he initially struggled to find others within the queer community to connect with. After discovering the sexual orientations of some of his friends, he was able to connect with others who shared similar experiences. This experience later inspired his work and creative expression.

== Work ==
As a student at Parsons, McGinley began experimenting with photography. In 1999, he put these early images together in a handmade, self-published book called The Kids Are Alright, titled after a film about The Who. He had his first public exhibition in 2000 at 420 West Broadway in Manhattan in a DIY opening. One copy of The Kids Are Alright was given to scholar and curator Sylvia Wolf, who later organized McGinley's solo exhibition at the Whitney. In an essay about McGinley, Wolf wrote, "The skateboarders, musicians, graffiti artists and gay people in Mr. McGinley's early work 'know what it means to be photographed.[...] His subjects are performing for the camera and exploring themselves with an acute self-awareness that is decidedly contemporary. They are savvy about visual culture, acutely aware of how identity can be not only communicated but created. They are willing collaborators." While he was a student at Parsons, McGinley was also the acting photo editor at Vice magazine from 2000 to 2002.

McGinley has been long time friends with fellow Lower Manhattan artists Dan Colen and the late Dash Snow. McGinley said of Snow, "I guess I get obsessed with people, and I really became fascinated by Dash."

Ariel Levy, writing in New York magazine about McGinley's friend and collaborator, Snow, said, "People fall in love with McGinleyʼs work because it tells a story about liberation and hedonism: Where Goldin and Larry Clark were saying something painful and anxiety producing about Kids and what happens when they take drugs and have sex in an ungoverned urban underworld, McGinley started out announcing that 'The Kids Are Alright,' fantastic, really, and suggested that a gleeful, unfettered subculture was just around the corner—'still'—if only you knew where to look."

McGinley's early work was primarily shot on 35mm film and using Yashica T4s and Leica R8s. Since 2004, McGinley's style has evolved from documenting his friends in real-life situations towards creating envisioned situations that can be photographed. He casts his subjects at rock ‘n’ roll festivals, art schools, and street castings in cities. In describing the essence of youth and adventure central to McGinley's work, Jeffrey Kluger wrote in Time, "Photography is about freezing a moment in time; McGinley's is about freezing a stage in a lifetime. Young and beautiful is as fleeting as a camera snap—and thus all the more worth preserving." In 2007, critic Philip Gefter wrote, "He was a fly on the wall. But then he began to direct the activities, photographing his subjects in a cinema-verite mode. 'I got to the point where I couldn't wait for the pictures to happen anymore,' he said. 'I was wasting time, and so I started making pictures happen. It borders between being set up or really happening. There's that fine line.'" The transition to creating work with an emphasis on heavy pre-production is embodied in McGinley's famous summer cross-country road trip series. In a 2014 feature, GQ said, "His road trips, legendary among city-dwelling creatives under 30 (they all know someone who knows someone who went on one), have been annual summer occasions for almost a decade. McGinley and his assistants start planning the journey in January. They consult maps, newspapers, travel books. It usually starts with a specific desire—wanting to shoot kids in a cypress tree with Spanish moss, say—and the trip itself is plotted according to where such a setting can be found." As McGinley continued the series, he began incorporating different elements into his photos, such as shooting with fireworks, animals, and in extreme locations like caves.

In conversation with filmmaker Gus Van Sant, McGinley described his practice of making photographs on the road and outside of his New York City based studio, "Such a big part of what I do is removing myself and other people from the city. Taking people to these beautiful and remote locations, being together for long periods of time, getting that intimacy, and doing all these intense activities together every day. In a way, it's like a bizarre summer camp or like touring in a rock band or traveling circus. It's all those things combined. Just taking everyone out of their element so you have their full attention."

In 2009, McGinley returned to the studio as he began experimenting within the confines of traditional studio portraiture. It was also the beginning of what became by 2010, an all entirely digital photography practice, his 2010 exhibition, Everybody Knows This Is Nowhere, at Team Gallery in NYC, where he displayed his first collection of black and white nudes. The series marked a significant shift in the style and production of McGinley's photographs. His continued work within the realm of digital studio portraiture eventually evolved into his Yearbook series. Team Gallery describes the 2014 installation as, "(...) a single artwork that consists of over five hundred studio portraits of some two hundred models, always in the nude, printed on vinyl and adhered to every available inch of the gallery's walls and ceilings. The installation's effect is hugely impressive in its standalone visual power, an enveloping entity flooding the entire space with bold color and form. Although the sheer abundance of available images renders a total "reading" impossible, there is never any sense of incompleteness, as each individual image functions autonomously, granting the viewer access to a delicate, once-private moment." Yearbook is a traveling exhibition, and while it has evolved in size and application process, it has been exhibited internationally in various forms in San Francisco; Amersfoort, the Netherlands; Basel, Switzerland; and Tokyo.

Throughout his career, McGinley has worked with various high-profile charities. Influenced by the death of his brother in 1995 due to HIV/AIDS-related complications, McGinley is vocally passionate about raising funds for HIV/AIDS awareness and treatment research. At the 2014 amfAR Gala, a photograph donated by McGinley was purchased by Miley Cyrus, who narrowly outbid Tom Ford, for a record breaking price. Also in 2014 McGinley photographed Ines Rau, a transgender person, fully nude for a spread in Playboy magazine called "Evolution."

In recent years, McGinley has become well known for the circle of successful younger artists surrounding him and his studio, prompting the New York Times to refer to him as, "The Pied Piper of the Downtown Art World". McGinley describes his mentorship practices as, "In a way, it's a curriculum, as I can give people advice because I’ve been through it."

In 2014, McGinley gave the commencement address at Parsons School of Design. To graduating students he offered the advice, "Say yes to almost everything and try new things. Don't be afraid to fail, and don't be afraid to work hard. Do your pictures—don't try and do somebody else's pictures. Don't get lost inside your head, and don't worry what camera you’re using." He continued, "I once heard the legendary indie director Derek Jarman had three rules for making his art films: 'Show up early, hold your own light, and don’t expect to get paid.' That always stuck with me. Approach art like it's your job. Show up for photography every day for eight hours. Take it as seriously as a doctor would medicine." Since 2005, McGinley has periodically lectured and critiqued works of MFA photography students at Yale University. He has been a member of the School of Visual Arts Mentors program.

=== Music ===
McGinley is credited for the formation of the New York City based band The Virgins after introducing and photographing two of its members in Tulum in 2004. He said of the band, "Their lyrics are really poetic and very much about New York and the life that we live." In 2008, the Icelandic post-rock band Sigur Rós used one of McGinley's images for their fifth album Með suð í eyrum við spilum endalaust. The video for the first track from the album, "Gobbledigook", was inspired by his work. In 2012, McGinley reunited with the band to direct the video for "Varúð". The non-profit Art Production Fund partnered with the NYC Taxi Commission to show the film in 3,000 cabs. The next year, it was screened in Times Square as part of Art Production Fund's Midnight Moment series, in which every night at midnight for one month the video played simultaneously on electronic billboards and newspaper kiosks throughout Times Square.

McGinley has photographed musicians for both album artwork and editorial projects. In 2012, he provided the artwork for Bat for Lashes's album The Haunted Man. In 2013, he created images for Katy Perry's fourth studio album, Prism. He photographed Beyonce for BEAT Magazine, Lady Gaga for Rolling Stone, and Lorde for Dazed and Confused.

=== Commercial and editorial work ===
McGinley contributed editorially to The New York Times Magazine including his 2004 Olympic Swimmers, 2008 Oscars Portfolio, and 2010 Winter Olympics.

He has worked in fashion editorial and advertising. In 2009, McGinley helped launch Levi's "Go Forth" campaign. In 2012 and 2013, he worked with U2 singer Bono on producing a short film and photographs for fashion brand EDUN. Additionally, he has made photographs for beauty and fragrance campaigns by Calvin Klein, Dior, Hermès, and Stella McCartney.

McGinley has also been featured as a model in campaigns by Gap, Marc Jacobs, Salvatore Ferragamo, and Uniqlo.

=== Short films ===
- 2010: Friends Forever
- 2010: Entrance Romance
- 2010: Pringle of Scotland – Spring Summer 2010, with Tilda Swinton (7:59 min.)
- 2012: Beautiful Rebels
- 2012: Varúð, for Sigur Rós
- 2012: The Virgins: Prima Materia
- 2013: Mind of its own, for Mercedes-Benz
- 2015: We Three, with David Armstrong and Jack Pierson

== Exhibitions ==
In 2003, the Whitney Museum gave McGinley a solo show as part of their First Exposure series. He has had solo shows at MoMA P.S.1 in New York (2004), and at the MUSAC in Leon, Spain (2005). In 2005, he was the laureate of the Rencontres d'Arles Discovery Award. In 2007 McGinley exhibited Irregular Regulars at Team Gallery in SoHo. Art critic David Velasco, in his review of the show, wrote, "McGinley went on a two-year road trip, traveling to dozens of Morrissey concerts in the US, the UK, and Mexico. The resultant photos, many of which are densely saturated in the concerts’ colored lights, feature candid shots of fans, regularly zooming in for seductive close-ups of enamored youngsters—a celebration of the ecstatic cult of fame and its ardent enablers."

In 2008 he exhibited I Know Where the Summer Goes, also at Team Gallery. Kluger, writing in Time, said, "But his favorite subject remains youth, as his 2008 exhibit, 'I Know Where the Summer Goes,' proves. In that collection, McGinley's troupe travels the country as he photographs them, sometimes clothed and often not, while they leap fences, lounge in a desert, play together in a tree."

In 2010, McGinley debuted his first collection of black and white studio nudes, Everybody Knows This Is Nowhere, at Team Gallery in New York. Later in 2010, his exhibition Life Adjustment Center was held at Ratio 3 in San Francisco. There he debuted two new portfolios of black and white portraits and color photographs. In 2012, he had simultaneous shows at Team Gallery's two SoHo locations. Animals and Grids juxtaposed two new series of photographs: nudes with animals and large grids of intimate portraits of young concert-goers. In 2013, McGinley exhibited his largest project to date,Yearbook. A collection of hundreds of colorful studio portraits but conceived as a single artwork, the installation covered every available inch of the walls of San Francisco's Ratio 3. In 2014, the exhibition grew larger, this time staged at Team Gallery. Yearbook continued to travel in 2015, showing at Kunsthal kAdE in Amersfoort and Art Unlimited at Art Basel.

In 2015, McGinley's work further departed from his summer road trip series with bicoastal exhibitions Fall and Winter, at Team Gallery's SoHo and Venice Beach locations. His work was featured in the Guggenheim Museum's 2015 exhibition, Storylines. The show was described as "an expansive view of the new paradigms for storytelling forged during the past ten years to communicate ideas about race, gender, sexuality, history, and politics, among other trenchant themes."

== Collections ==
McGinley's work is held in the following public collections:

- Solomon R. Guggenheim Museum, New York
- Institute of Contemporary Art, Miami
- National Portrait Gallery, Washington, D.C.
- San Francisco Museum of Modern Art
- Whitney Museum of American Art, New York

== Publications ==
- The Kids Are Alright. New York: Handmade, 2002.
- Ryan McGinley (PS1 exhibition catalogue). New York: Flasher Factory, 2004. ISBN 0-9754527-1-1.
- Sun and Health. Paris: agnès b. Galerie du Jour, 2006. ISBN 2-906496-48-0.
- Moonmilk. London: Mörel, 2009. ISBN 978-1-907071-09-6.
- Life Adjustment Center. New York: Dashwood, 2010. ISBN 978-0-9844546-2-4.
- You and I. Santa Fe: Twin Palms, 2011. ISBN 978-1931885515.
- Whistle for the Wind. Milan: Rizzoli International, 2012. ISBN 978-0847838318.
- Way Far. Milan: Rizzoli International, 2015. ISBN 978-0847846917.
- The Journey is the Destination: the Ryan McGinley Purple Book. Paris: Purple Institute, 2013. Originally distributed with Purple Fashion issue 19.
