= Janet Sobel =

American painter (1893–1968)

- Born: Jennie Olechovsky; May 31, 1893; Katerynoslav, Russian Empire (now Dnipro, Ukraine)
- Died: November 11, 1968 (aged 75); Plainfield, New Jersey
- Education: None
- Known for: Drip painting, all-over painting
- Notable work: Pro and Contra (1941), Through the Glass (1944), Milky Way (1945)
- Movement: Abstract Expressionism
- Spouse: Max Sobel

Janet Sobel (May 31, 1893 – November 11, 1968), born Jennie Olechovsky (occ. Lechovsky), was a Ukrainian-born American Abstract Expressionist painter who pioneered the drip painting technique; her work directly influenced Jackson Pollock. She was credited as exhibiting the first instance of all-over painting seen by Clement Greenberg, a notable art critic. Her career started mid-life, at age forty-five in 1938.

== Early life ==
Janet Sobel was born as Jennie Olechovsky in 1893 in Katerynoslav, Russian Empire (now Dnipro, Ukraine). Her father, Baruch Olechovsky, was killed in a Russian pogrom. In 1908, Sobel moved to Brighton Beach, Brooklyn with her mother, Fannie Kinchuk, a midwife, and her siblings. Two years later, she married Max Sobel, a fellow emigrant from Ukraine, with whom she had five children.

== Career ==
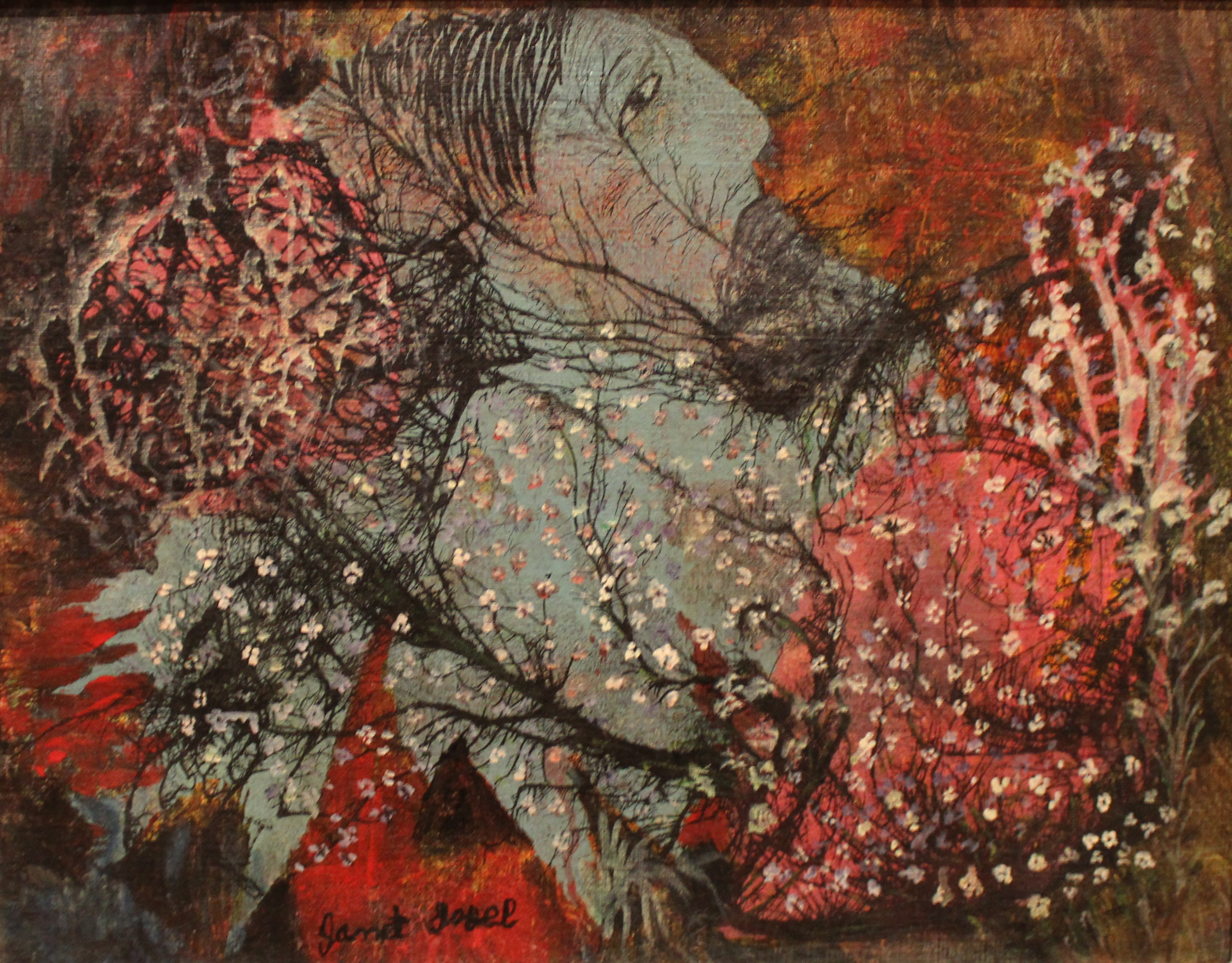
Invasion Day by Sobel on display at the Pennsylvania Academy of the Fine Arts

Sobel was already a grandmother when she began painting in 1937. She produced both non-objective abstractions and figurative artwork. Upon recognizing Sobel's talent, her son Sol, an art student, helped her artistic development and shared her work with émigré surrealists Max Ernst and André Breton, as well as John Dewey and Sidney Janis.

Sobel presented her first solo show at Puma Gallery in New York in 1944. Peggy Guggenheim included Sobel's work in the show The Women in her Art of This Century Gallery in 1945, alongside work by Louise Bourgeois and Kay Sage, among others. The following year, she invited her for a solo show at the same space; the brochure for the show was written by Sidney Janis.

From 1943 through 1946, Janet Sobel became a powerful presence in the New York art world. She exhibited in the 27th Annual at the Brooklyn Museum in 1943 (she would also exhibit there in 1944 and 1945).

In 2016 her biography was included in the exhibition catalogue Women of Abstract Expressionism organized by the Denver Art Museum. Her work was included in the 2024 exhibition Making Their Mark: Works from the Shah Garg Collection at the Berkeley Art Museum and Pacific Film Archive (BAMPFA).

=== Effect of inspiration ===
Her belief in the ethics of self-realization in a democracy led to Sobel's encounter with philosopher John Dewey. Dewey championed Sobel by writing about her in a catalogue statement at the Puma Gallery in New York in 1944:

Her work is extraordinarily free from inventiveness and from self-consciousness and pretense. One can believe that to an unusual degree her forms and colors well up from a subconsciousness that is richly stored with sensitive impressions received directly from contact with nature, impressions which have been reorganized in figures in which color and form are happily wed.

Sobel listened to music while she painted for inspiration and stimulation. "There was a radio in each of the four rooms of her Brighton Beach apartment, and they played Janet's favorite songs. The music helped to put her in a trance where, armed with a brush, she could discover more and more secret rooms in her subconscious." Sobel's works exemplify the tendency to fill up every empty space, sometimes interpreted as horror vacui. She often depicted her feelings through past experiences. Her depiction of soldiers with cannons and imperial armies, as well as traditional Jewish families, reflected the experiences of her childhood. Her figures often demonstrated the time of the Holocaust, where she relived the trauma of her youth. Overcoming those youthful traumas, Sobel found a safe realm for her imagination through art.

=== Effect of art critics ===
Sobel's painting Milky Way (owned by the MoMa) was created in 1945, two years before Jackson Pollock began experimenting with drip painting. Clement Greenberg, an art authority during Sobel's time, writing on avant-garde painting, mentioned that Jackson Pollock had noticed Janet Sobel's painting in the 1940s. Pollock "'admitted that these pictures had made an impression on him'".

In his essay "'American-Type' Painting", first published in 1955, Greenberg cited Sobel's works as the first instance of all-over painting he had seen. Although he didn't acknowledge her during the three years her professional works circulated in New York galleries, he eventually positioned "Sobel as a forerunner of Abstract Expressionism". Generally, he only framed Sobel's work relative to Abstract Expressionism or to Pollock, and especially in relation to Pollock's career. Greenberg consistently described Sobel's work as inferior to that of Pollock by characterizing it as "'primitive'" and that of a "'housewife'". Her paintings were characterized as belonging to "the realms of surrealism and primitivism."

As Sandra Zalman writes, "Sobel was part folk artist, Surrealist, and Abstract Expressionist, but critics found it easiest to call her a 'primitive'." This "category (that) enabled her acceptance by the art world, but restricted her artistic development". For example, Sobel is said to lack the "heroic scale" of Pollock. Sobel was grouped as inferior due to being a housewife, while other painters, such as Mark Tobey, were also dismissed as inferior in some way.

== Death ==
Sobel died at her home in Plainfield, New Jersey in 1968. In 2021, The New York Times published a belated obituary for her.

== Exhibitions ==
- 1944: Janet Sobel, Puma Gallery, New York, solo show
- 1946: Paintings by Janet Sobel, Art of this Century Gallery, New York
- 1962: Janet Sobel Paintings and Drawings, Swain's Art Store, Plainfield, New Jersey
- 2002: Janet Sobel: Selected Works from the Artist's Estate, Gary Snyder Fine Art, New York
- 2005, Janet Sobel, D.C. Moore, New York
- 2010: Janet Sobel: Drip Paintings and Selected Works on Paper, Gary Snyder/Project Space, New York
- 2021: Women in Abstraction. Centre Pompidou.
- 2023: Action, Gesture, Paint: Women Artists and Global Abstraction 1940-1970, Whitechapel Gallery London
- 2023: Janet Sobel: Wartime, The Ukrainian Museum, NYC
- 2024: Janet Sobel: All-Over, The Menil Collection, Houston
