= David Diao =

- Born: 1943 (age 82–83); Chengdu, China
- Known for: Painting
- Movement: Lyrical Abstraction, Hard-Edge Painting, Pop art
- Elected: National Academy (2012)

David Diao (born 1943) is a Chinese American artist and teacher based in New York City.

== Background ==
David Diao (刁德谦) was born in Chengdu, China. Several years of his childhood were spent in Hong Kong, at the moment of the Chinese Communist Revolution in October 1949, before he ultimately settled in the United States. His father was a student in the US and later became a structural engineer. Diao joined his father in New York in 1955 at the age of 12.

== Career ==
Diao completed his undergraduate degree at Kenyon College in Gambier, Ohio and in 1964 he moved back to New York. There he began working as an artist in the late 1960s. Firstly, he got the job as the sweeper-upper at the Kootz Gallery. Sam Kootz, the owner of this gallery, was among the first to show Abstract Expressionism. In 1966 he worked at the Guggenheim, where he installed shows in case some extra help was necessary.

He first won acclaim and public attention with an exhibition at Paula Cooper Gallery in 1969. He is known for his simplification of form, minimal compositions, and uses of stylized text and typography.

Diao has served on the faculty at Hampshire College where he met Walid Raad, with whom he has collaborated. Diao's work was included at dOCUMENTA 13. His work is featured in the collection of the Hirshhorn Museum and Sculpture Garden, MoMA, the Whitney Museum of American Art, SFMOMA, Rennes's public council collection, among others. Diao taught at the Cooper Union in the early 70s and was then mostly doing color field painting made by squeegying paint across a large canvas. In 2008 he had his first exhibition in China. In 2012, he was elected into the National Academy of Design. He received a Foundation for Contemporary Arts Grants to Artists award (2015).

Diao is currently represented by Greene Naftali, New York; Tanya Leighton, Berlin; and Office Baroque, Brussels.

== Past Shows ==
- Le Consortium, Thematic exhibition, New York : The Eighties; part two (extended version), France, Dijon, 07 Jan - 25 April 2021.
- Le Consortium, Thematic exhibition, New York: The 1980s; part two, France, Dijon, 26 Oct 2019 - 04 Oct 2020.
- ShanghART Gallery, "Shadows of Forgotten Ancestors, Beijing, China, May 24 - Jul 24 2018.
- Postmasters gallery, "ALT-FACTS", NY, Jul 17 - Jul 29 2017.
- Postmasters gallery, DAVID DIAO - Hong Kong Boyhood, NY, Feb 17 - Mar 11 2017.
- UCCA Center for Contemporary Art, David Diao, Beijing, China, Sep 19 - Oct 15 2015.
- Minus Space, Nov 1 - Dec 20 2014.
- Whitney Museum of American Art, 2014 Whitney Biennial, NY, Mar 7 - May 25, 2014.
- Postmasters gallery, DAVID DIAO - TMI, NY, Mar 23 - Apr 27 2013
