= Chloe Piene =

Artist

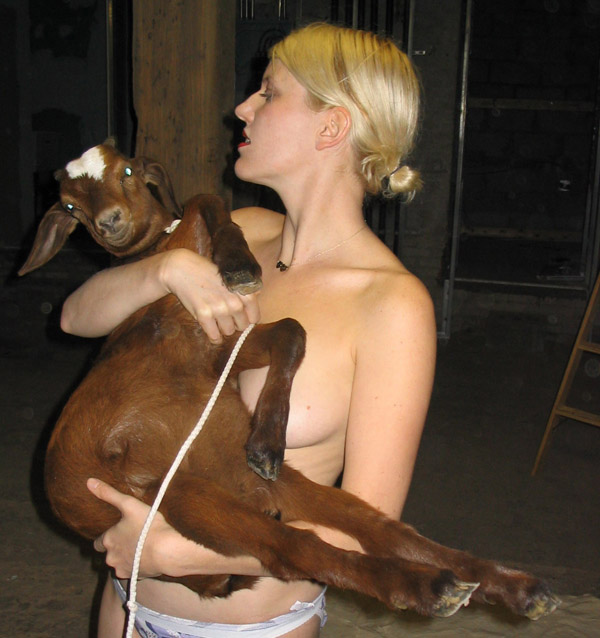
- Piene holding a goat, Bronx, New York, 2004
- Born: 1972 (age 53–54)
- Known for: Visual artist
- Website: chloepiene.com

Chloe Piene (born 1972) is a visual artist known primarily for her drawing.

== Biography ==
Piene received her BA in Art History with a concentration in Northern Renaissance Art from Columbia University and her MFA in Fine Art from Goldsmiths, University of London.

== Drawing ==
Her drawing has been described as "brutal, delicate, figurative, forensic, erotic, and fantastic". Her work has made various and diverse associations with prisoners, love letters, neolithic burial schema failure, history, heroic transformation, and epic sagas such as the Finnish Kalevala.

One of her many art historical references is Death and the Maiden (1517) by Hans Baldung Grien. In this, a panicked maiden is seized by a kiss from a grotesque and rotten death. "Yet with Piene, the two mythological figures melt together, since in her charcoal drawings we encounter not Death and the Maiden, but rather the Maiden as Death."

== Video ==
Her large-scale video works utilize the greater sensory impact of noise, time, darkness, and misrecognition to visibly extend into the more subterranean levels of experience. Her video “Blackmouth” premiered at the 2004 Whitney Bienniall. “You're Gonna Be My Woman” was shown at Kunsthalle Bern in 2003 and “Little David” for the first time at Marianne Boesky Gallery in 2000. Her military triptych “I'm Hit”, “Gun” and “Shrapnel” 2015 premiered at Suzanne Vielmetter Projects in Los Angeles.

== Sculpture ==
Steel, iron, and plasticine cast from skulls reflect an "under-structure" prevalent in all her work.

== Performance ==
Chloe Piene's exhibition at Marianne Boesky Gallery (2000) included drawings, video and a live performance in which nine former convicts and nine women read from correspondence Piene had with a prisoner serving a 99-year sentence, the performance stemmed from her publication from the correspondences entitled "Lovelady, Texas".

Other performances include To Serve (2015), a collaborative dialogue with a United States Special Operations Commander in New York, tandem to her three-part video series which worked directly with cameras strapped to the heads of soldiers stationed in Afghanistan.

Piene performed Familienaufstellung (2016) in Vienna with Diethard Leopold as an arrangement where people played family members, both living and dead included were Matthew Barney as her brother, and Petra Morzé as her mother.

== Selected Exhibitions ==
All Sins Are Murder Even As All Life Is War: Chloe Piene and Erna Rosenstein. Chloe Piene and Erna Rosenstein, Galeria Szydłowski, Warsaw, Poland, 2024; A Passion for Drawing, Selections from The Guerlain Collection at the Centre Pompidou and Drawing Now, Drawing Now at the Albertina, Vienna, 2019; Schiele Reloaded, in which Piene paired with Egon Schiele as part of his Centennial at the Leopold Museum, Vienna, 2018; HB + CP - Hans Bellmer and Chloe Piene at Galerie Nathalie Obadia, Paris, 2008; Bodies of Desire: Works on paper by Willem de Kooning and Chloe Piene at the Locks Gallery, Philadelphia, 2007; and the 2004 Whitney Biennial.

== Selected Public Collections ==
- Herbert F. Johnson Museum of Art, Ithaca, New York
- Museum of Contemporary Art, Los Angeles
- Museum of Modern Art, New York
- San Francisco Museum of Modern Art, San Francisco
- Walker Art Center, Minneapolis
- Whitney Museum of American Art, New York
- Burger Collection, Berlin
- Kupferstichkabinett, Staatliche Museen zu Berlin
- Sammlung Hoffman, Berlin
- Kupferstich-Kabinett, Staatliche Kunstsammlungen, Dresden
- The Centre Pompidou, Paris, France
- Museum of Contemporary Art, Los Angeles, USA
- The Marie-Luise Hessel Collection, Bard College, New York, USA
- Fondation d'art contemporain Daniel et Floerence Guerlain, Paris, FRANCE

== Awards ==
2022 Laurate, 15th Prix de dessin contemporain, Fondation Daniel & Florence Guerlain.
