= Keegan McHargue =

American artist (born 1982)

- Born: 1982 (age 43–44); Portland, Oregon, U.S.
- Known for: Painting and drawing
- Style: Outsider art, neo-mannerism

Keegan McHargue (born 1982) is an American artist known for his dream-like drawings and paintings. McHargue is sometimes described as either an outsider artist or faux-outsider artist. He lives and works in New York City.

== About ==
McHargue was seen as a successful emerging artist by age 21 and never attended art school. He previously lived in San Francisco, and briefly lived in Austin, Texas before moving to New York City.

In 2007, he created a body of artwork "The Yellow Spectrum" specifically for an audience of babies, and a few years later with the "Preteen" work his audience was teenagers and preteens.

In a 2010 interview, McHargue made comparisons between the fields of art and advertising. McHargue said about his process, "I tend to shy away from expressionistic concerns that compromise control. In a sense, everything in my art becomes about particular processes. That's how process became the most important part of my painting. I always say that I'm not a particularly good painter but I'm a very strategic painter".

McHargue's work is in various public art collections including Museum of Modern Art (MoMA), Fine Arts Museums of San Francisco (FAMSF), among others_{.}

== Exhibitions ==
This is a list of select exhibitions by McHargue.

- 2003 – "The Wolfman Cometh", solo exhibition, Rivington Arms, New York City, New York
- 2006 – "The Control Group", Metro Pictures Gallery, Chelsea, New York City, New York
- 2005 – "Drawing Circles", solo exhibition, Hiromi Yoshii Gallery, Tokyo, Japan
- 2004 – "Large Dudes", exhibition with Matt Leines, The Wrong Gallery, New York City, New York
- 2004 – "Deliver Us From Evil: Dinos & Jake Chapman, R. Crumb, Honore Daumir, Dr. Lakra, Keegan McHargue", Matthew Marks Gallery, New York City, New York
- 2004 – "Feel the Wind", Jack Hanley Gallery, San Francisco, California
- 2004 – "Incantations", group exhibition, Metro Pictures Gallery, Chelsea, New York City, New York
- 2013 – "Prick of Conscience", solo exhibition, Fredericks & Freiser Gallery, New York City, New York

== Publications ==
- HcHargue, Keegan (2009). Foibles (oversized artist book). San Francisco, California: Seems publishing. ISBN 9781607434726.
