= Drip painting =

Style of abstract painting

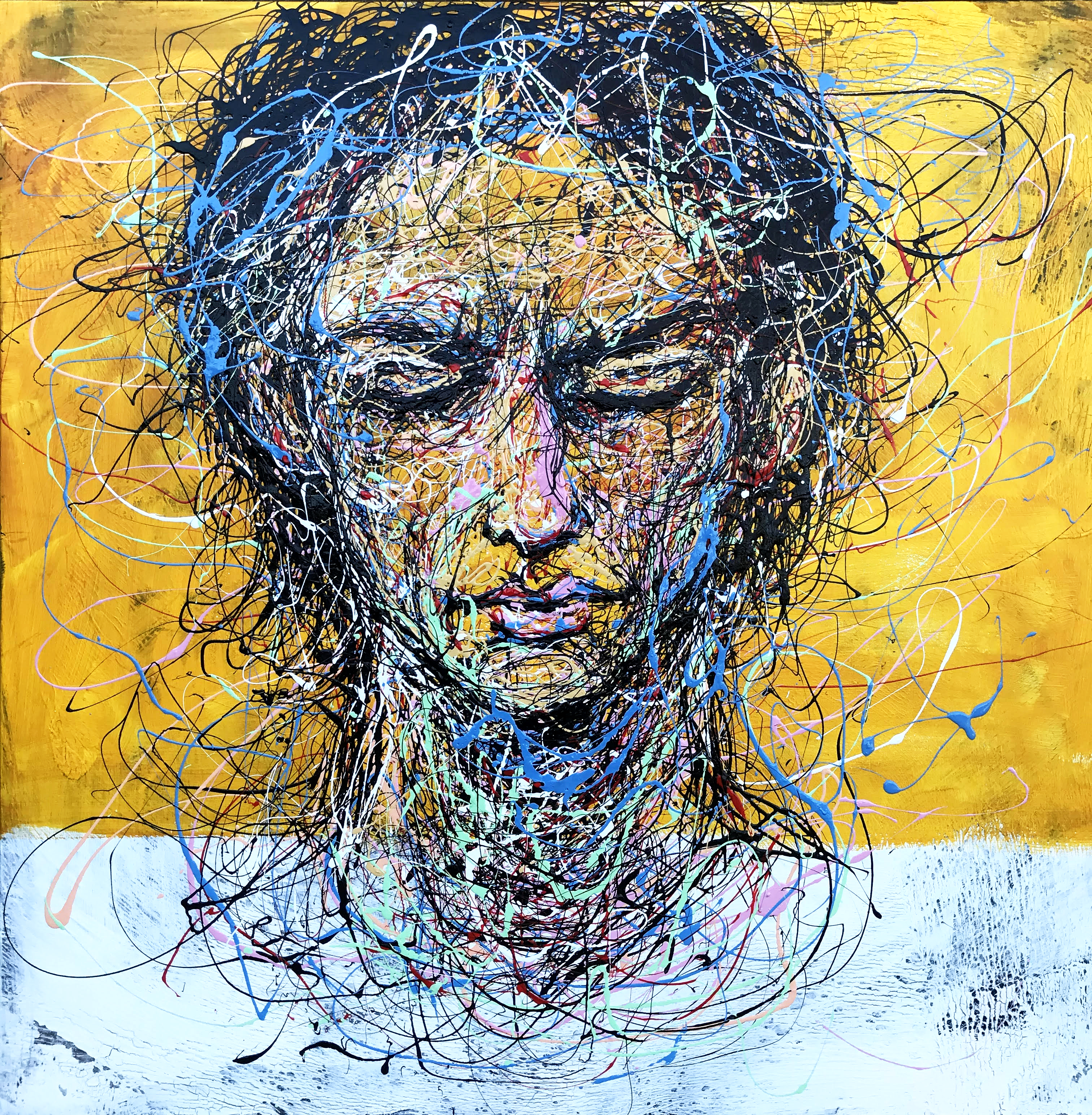
An example of drip painting techniques used to create a portrait.

Drip painting is a form of art, often abstract art, in which paint is dripped or poured on to the canvas. This style of action painting was experimented with in the first half of the twentieth century by such artists as Francis Picabia, André Masson and Max Ernst, who employed drip painting in his works The Bewildered Planet, and Young Man Intrigued by the Flight of a Non-Euclidean Fly (1942). Ernst used the novel means of painting Lissajous figures by swinging a punctured bucket of paint over a horizontal canvas.

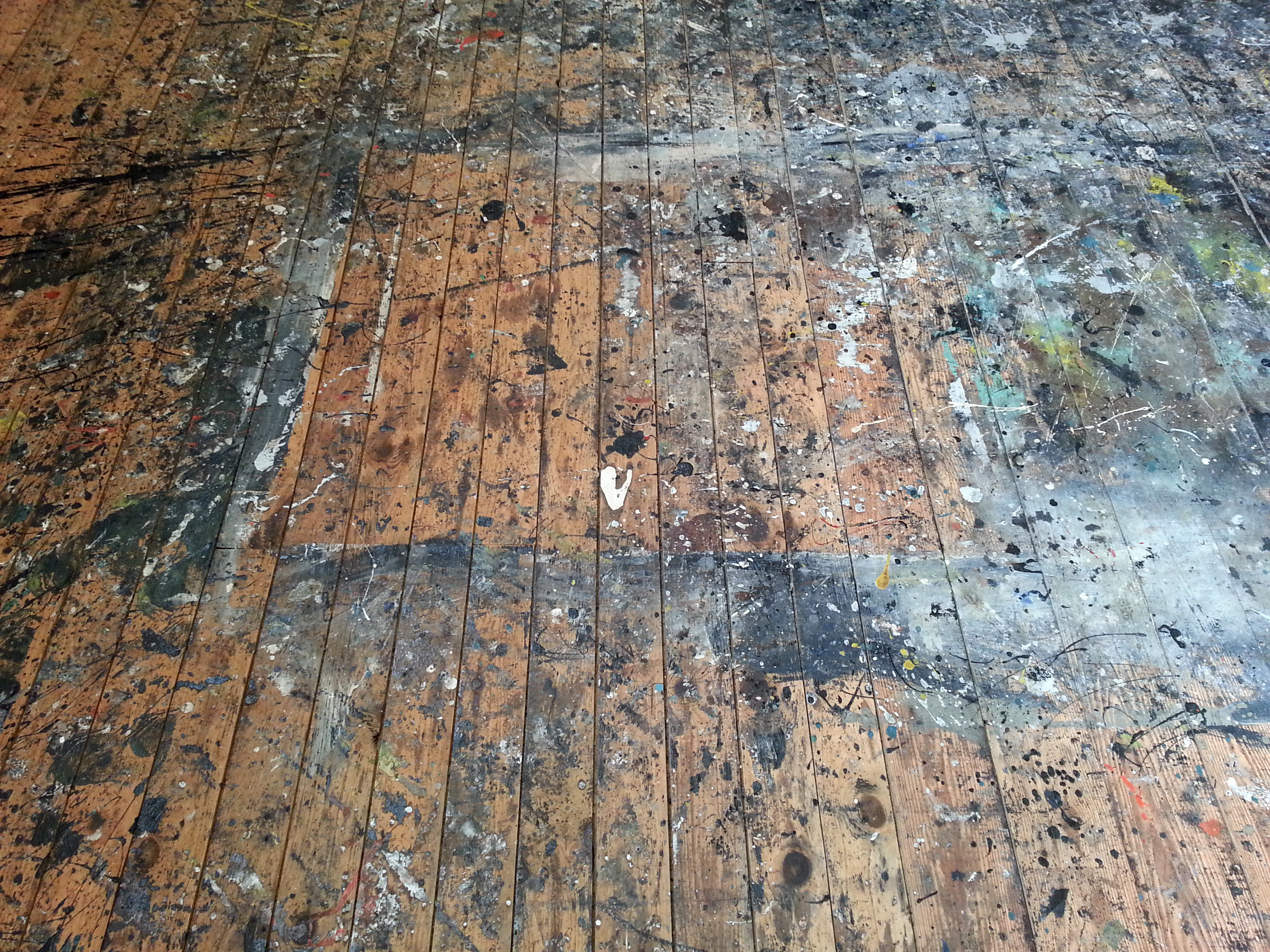
Pollock's studio-floor in Springs, New York, the visual result of being his primary painting surface from 1946 until 1953

Drip painting found particular expression in the work of the mid-twentieth-century artists Janet Sobel—who pioneered the technique—and Jackson Pollock. Pollock found drip painting to his liking, later using the technique almost exclusively. He used unconventional tools like sticks, hardened brushes and even basting syringes to create large and energetic abstract works. Pollock used house or industrial paint to create his paintings—Pollock's wife Lee Krasner described his palette as "typically a can or two of … enamel, thinned to the point he wanted it, standing on the floor besides the rolled-out canvas" and that Pollock used Duco or Davoe and Reynolds brands of house paint. House paint was less viscous than traditional tubes of oil paint, and Pollock thus created his large compositions horizontally to prevent his paint from running. His gestural lines create a unified overall pattern that allows the eye to travel from one of the canvases to the other and back again.

Sources for the drip technique include Navajo sandpainting. Sandpainting was also performed flat on the ground. Another source is the "underpainting" techniques of the Mexican muralists painters. The drip–splash marks made by mural painter David Alfaro Siqueiros allow him to work out his composition of a multitude of Mexican workers and heroes.

Contemporary artists who have used drip painting include Lynda Benglis, Norman Bluhm, Dan Christensen, Ian Davenport, Ronald Davis, Rodney Graham, John Hoyland, Ronnie Landfield, Zane Lewis, Joan Mitchell, Roxy Paine, Larry Poons, Pat Steir, Andre Thomkins, Zevs, and Fred Friedrich.

== See also ==
- List of art techniques
