= Dan Colen =

American painter and sculptor

- Born: Daniel Colen; 1979 (age 46–47); Leonia, New Jersey, U.S.
- Education: Rhode Island School of Design
- Known for: Painting

Daniel Colen (born 1979) is an American artist based in New York. His work consists of painted sculptures appropriating low-cultural ephemera, graffiti-inspired paintings of text executed in paint, and installations.

== Early life and education ==
Born in 1979 and raised in Leonia, New Jersey. His father, Sy Colen, a wood and clay sculptor, was a participant in the 2006 reality TV show Artstar. Colen attended Solomon Schechter Day School, and was raised Jewish. Colen graduated with a B.F.A. in Painting from the Rhode Island School of Design in 2001. After graduation he moved to the East Village in Manhattan, and by June 2006 he became a recognised artist.

== Work ==
In his work, Secrets and Cymbals, Smoke and Scissors: My Friend Dash's Wall in the Future (2004), Colen built an exact replica of a section of poster, photo and flyer-covered wall from friend Dash Snow's apartment. Each piece of visual material was handmade and attached to a Styrofoam copy of the wall.

In 2007, Dash Snow and Colen shredded phone books in Jeffrey Deitch's SoHo gallery for an installation called Nest or Hamster Nest. He was described by The Guardian as a "bad boy of post-pop New York".

== Personal life ==
Colen was close friends with artists Dash Snow and Ryan McGinley. When Snow died in 2009 of a heroin overdose, Colen was greatly impacted and said he was determined to end his own addiction.

== Exhibitions ==
- Potty Mouth, Potty War, Pot Roast, Pot is a Reality Kick, Gagosian Gallery, New York, 2006
- USA Today - new American Art from the Saatchi Collection, Royal Academy of Arts, London
- Whitney Biennial, New York, 2006
- Fantastic Politics, National Museum of Art, Architecture and Design, Oslo
- No Me, Peres Projects, Berlin, 2006. Solo exhibition.
- Dan Colen – Works from the Astrup Fearnley Collection, Astrup Fearnley Museum of Modern Art, Oslo, Norway, 2018. Solo exhibition.

== Collections ==
Colen's work is held in the following collections:

- Saatchi Gallery
- Whitney Museum of American Art
- Astrup Fearnley Museum of Modern Art
