= Alex Arcadia =

American sculptor

- Born: United States
- Occupations: Painter, sculptor, conceptual artist
- Known for: SuperGymnast image, Temple of Fame, Bright Shiny Future (BSF)
- Notable work: SuperGymnast, Temple of Fame
- Style: Post-Warholian pop, readymade tradition
- Movement: Contemporary art, conceptual art

Alex Arcadia is an American painter, sculptor and conceptual artist. His self-titled cosmology "Arcadia" provides the framework for his large scale paintings, sculptures and installations, which are both post-Warholian pop, and deviant in the readymade tradition of Marcel Duchamp.

Arcadia is best known for his "SuperGymnast" image, an erotically charged goddess and recurring central figure of power in his work. In the mid-1990s the SuperGymnast was planted by the tens of thousands throughout the streets of New York City as a tag, quickly making the symbol synonymous with the identity of the artist.

Arcadia debuted the SuperGymnast as sculpture atop his "Temple of Fame" (1999–2000). Artifacts from "Temple of Fame" were featured in his first New York City solo exhibition at Stefan Stux Gallery in 2001 entitled "SuperGymnast", reviewed in the New York Times.

Arcadia appears in filmmaker Ondi Timoner's 2007 documentary We Live In Public, a film centered on the millennial art and performance event called Quiet, which was produced by Arcadia's friend, collector, and internet figure Josh Harris, and took place in downtown Manhattan (1999–2000) during the last days of the dot-com boom.

Alex Arcadia continues to define a new mythology he calls Bright Shiny Future (BSF).

He lives and works in New York City.
