= Rivington Arms =

Coordinates: 40.71865°N 73.98356°W

Rivington Arms was an art gallery in New York City.

Melissa Bent and Mirabelle Marden (daughter of artists Helen and Brice Marden) founded the gallery as a small storefront on Rivington Street in 2001, part of a new wave of galleries opening on the Lower East Side. In 2005, it moved to a larger space on East 2nd Street.

The gallery participates in the following art fairs: The Armory Show, Frieze, NADA, and VOLTAshow.

It was announced on November 5, 2008, in Artforum that due to business differences, Rivington Arms would be closing its location in January 2009 after they attended the Frieze Art Fair in London.

== Artists represented ==
- Uri Aran
- Darren Bader
- Mathew Cerletty
- John Finneran
- Shara Hughes
- Lansing-Dreiden
- Hanna Liden
- Carter Mull
- Dash Snow
- Pinar Yolacan
