= Zane Lewis =

American painter

- Born: 1981 (age 44–45)
- Education: School of Visual Arts, Atlanta College of Art
- Known for: Artist, Painting, Sculpture, Abstraction

Zane Lewis (born 1981) is an American visual artist based in Brooklyn, New York. His abstract paintings and sculptures reference color field painting, pointillism, phenomenology, and minimalism. And have been stylistically referred to as 'psychedelic minimalism'.

The acclaimed New York Times art critic Roberta Smith called Lewis' paintings "skillfully spray-painted whose shifting tonalities and densities have a glowing, slightly psychedelic look suggesting an admiration for Jules Olitski, the California Light and Space movement and Las Vegas. Spray-painted with diaphanous textures, delicate and unexpectedly beautiful." Lewis' works contain a phenomenological aura pushing the notion of direct experience upon the viewer. This essence becomes part of Lewis' tool kit as he forces those to engage his paintings sculpturally, a "Turrellian approach" to painting.

== Biography ==
Lewis was born in San Antonio, Texas, and studied fine arts at the School of Visual Arts in New York, and the Atlanta College of Art affiliated with the High Museum of Art, where he earned a BFA degree in sculpture. Lewis was the youngest artist to exhibit at the Museum of Contemporary Art in Georgia, having been commissioned by the museum to create an installation before completing his undergraduate degree.

== Work ==
=== Early work ===
Zane Lewis often blurs conventional distinctions between painting and sculpture. Early in his career he presented his work in installation-like formats hanging canvases with printed-images, then painting them onsite in the gallery. The paint dripped on the floor would become part of the exhibition. In a further extension of his practice, he created new works cut from the dried paint puddles left behind. Lewis referred to recycling and "remixing" images like a DJ.

Lewis's unique drip painting technique allowed different colors of paint to combine without mixing while retaining a wet look. These cascades of paint leaked from canvases and spilled onto the floor of the exhibition space. Christopher Bollen, Editor-in-Chief of Interview Magazine, called this method of Lewis' "making art bleed." "The artist allows the gash to “bleed” brightly colored paint (which he has applied), in order to express a transient and dying glamor."

Lewis' mix of abstraction and appropriated images caught the attention of The Wall Street Journal who included Lewis in the article "The 23-Year Old Masters," along with artists Ryan Trecartin, Jordan Wolfson and Dash Snow in a selection of ten top young US artists. Lewis has exhibited at Whitney Museum of American Art in conjunction with Phillips de Pury and was featured as a "Groundbreaker" artist in groundbreaking ceremony for the new location in lower Manhattan.

=== Stylistic shift ===
Between 2010 and 2013 Lewis' website stated he was dead, however this was proven false. During that time period Lewis distanced himself from exhibiting and his involvement with the art world. Lewis marks this as a "transitional period," which certain elements of his work "had to die." Here marks the artists rejection of imagery and a shift toward total abstraction.

Lewis is known to avoid interviews and to have denied reputable collectors studio visits or only allowing them to view his studio by themselves.

== Exhibitions include ==
The Aishti Foundation (Lebanon), The Whitney Museum of American Art (New York, NY), The Museum of Fine Arts Houston (TX), Museo De La Ciudad De Mexico (Mexico City), The Museum of Contemporary Art (Atlanta, GA), Hauser & Wirth (Los Angeles, CA), Galerie Eric Hussenot (Paris, France), The Hudson River Museum, The Watermill Center and Columbia University.

Lewis is also a distant cousin of James Dean.
