= Mathew Cerletty =

American artist (born 1980)

Mathew Cerletty (born 1980, Wauwatosa, Wisconsin) is an artist who lives and works in New York City.

Cerletty studied at Boston University College of Fine Arts graduating with a BFA in 2002.

His work has been exhibited at galleries and museums worldwide. Cerletty's works can be found in the collections of the Astrup Fearnley Museum of Modern Art, Oslo; Buffalo AKG Art Museum, New York; Institute of Contemporary Art, Miami; Madison Museum of Contemporary Art, Wisconsin; Milwaukee Art Museum, Wisconsin; and the Whitney Museum of American Art, New York. He is represented by Karma in New York and LA, and Standard in Oslo, Norway.

In a 2008 article in the magazine Interview, Christopher Bollen described Cerletty as an artist who "could have remained his generation's premier portrait artist." Since then his practice has expanded to include text, patterned abstraction, landscape, and most recently portrayals of household objects.

He uses a variety of painting styles, most notably hyper-realistic precision, to bring significance to ordinary and unexpected subjects–from corporate logos, to cinder block walls, to Ikea furniture. In the vein of surrealists like René Magritte, his paintings present the familiar as peculiar. Although Cerletty approaches his images with a tongue-in-cheek humor, there is an underlying sincerity in his attention to detail.
