= Olivier Zahm =

French fashion journalist

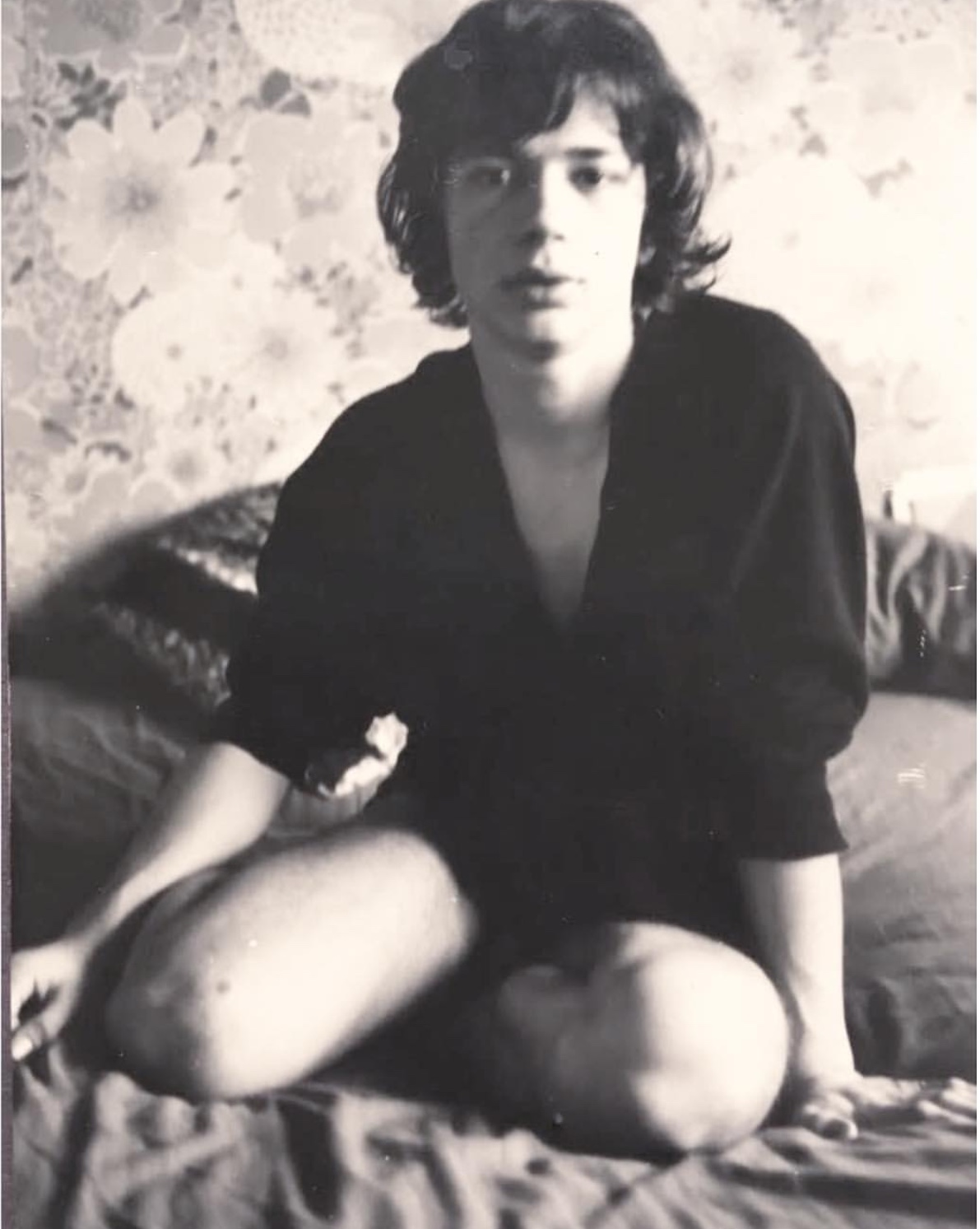
- Zahm in Paris (1979)
- Born: 25 September 1963 (age 63); Paris, France
- Education: Panthéon-Sorbonne University
- Occupations: Magazine editor, photographer, art critic, writer, fashion journalist Creator of “la communauté des amants”
- Years active: 1985–present
- Known for: Editor-in-chief and co-founder of Purple Magazine
- Website: purple.fr

Olivier Zahm (born 25 September 1963) is a French magazine editor, art critic, art director, curator, writer, and photographer He is the co-founder, owner, and current editor-in-chief of the bi-annual art and fashion magazine Purple. In addition to his innovative print publishing, he is a recognized pioneering cultural influence at the dawn of the electronic era during the Digital Revolution. His early blogs garnered notoriety, and featured highly stylized photographs taken by him, that took his audience on daily tours of his fantasyland populated by the artists, intellectuals, designers, filmmakers, socialites, models and celebrities who regularly appeared in his magazine. His aesthetic has been described as anti-fashion, counterculture, and unfettered by the constraints of the mainstream publishing world. His online activity served as an early electronic precursor to popular social media platforms like Facebook and Instagram. His magazine remains one of the only independent and privately owned publications of its kind. Created in the beginning of the 1990s – it still remains a major reference for other alternative magazines today.

== Early life and education ==
Olivier Zahm was born and raised in Paris, France. He was the eldest of three children born to two university professors. His parents, who were both students at the time of his birth, raised Zahm and his other siblings in student quarters that were designed by Charlotte Perriand and Jean Prouvé, located at Résidence Universitaire Jean-Zay in Antony. Much of his early childhood was spent in academic settings, particularly- during the volatile period of civil unrest in France that broke out in May 1968. The protests reached such a point that political leaders feared civil war or revolution. The unrest began with a series of student occupation protests against capitalism, consumerism, American imperialism, and traditional institutions, values and order.

Many of the new and radical ideas surrounding Zahm, immersing his youth in tumultuous generational discord, stayed with him, shaping his views on art, philosophical ideas and lifestyle choices. He leveraged his profound formative experience using it as a tool to build aspects and themes that remain prevalent in his personal and professional life in adulthood. He told The New York Times in 2010 that he, "remembers summers spent vacationing in the South of France with his parents in a community of like minded free spirits" – who he labeled hippies. It was the 1970s, the decade of sex revolution and Zahm's parents were committed to free love, nudism and polyamorous relationships. "My parents had a lot of lovers, they had a lot of affairs. At the time, my parents were really part of this alternative movement in Paris but quite bourgeois too. It wasn't San Francisco or New York. It was the French way."

Zahm's love of magazines began when he was a teenager in the Paris suburbs. "We used to steal porn magazines in the bookstores and shops and look at them during school," he says. "It was fun and secret. This is where my obsession for magazines comes from. Magazines used to reveal and give us access to sex, fashion, music and art. TV never did that, and books are mostly academic. Magazines were a symbol of freedom."

He studied philosophy, history, semiotics and literature at the Sorbonne. His father, Claude, taught philosophy, and Zahm was on track to do the same, before realizing, at 25, that he preferred life outside "la tour d’ ivoire." Zahm's youngest sister committed suicide in 1994 at the age of 20.

== Career ==
Before entering the world of fashion, Zahm worked as an art critic with widespread recognition for his work as a curator as well as his participation in over 150 exhibitions featuring international contemporary art. In responding to the superficial glamour of the 1980s, Zahm co-founded Purple Prose magazine. In the introduction of Purple Anthology, Zahm shares why he chose to create Purple Prose:

"We launched Purple Prose in the early 1990s without any means, and without any experience, because we wanted to make a magazine that was radically different. We wanted to support the artists around us that no one else supported, much less talked about. It would be a form of opposition of our own".

=== Art critic and curator (1985–1994) ===
During the beginning of the 80s Zahm started to observe and take an interest in the art world. He liked the notion of "being everywhere and on the move", following art fairs, meeting artists, educating himself in the universe of contemporary art while immersing himself into its social landscape. Zahm's gift of being a charismatic intellectual and having an eye for contemporary art made itself apparent early on. He found himself penning for the three leading art titles at the time Art Forum, Art Flash, Texte zur Kunst and Art presse and introduced a then unknown Jeff Koons, Martin Kippenberger, and Larry Clark to the European art world. He started traveling to the United States and Japan, realizing he could set up his own operation and work agenda, 24/7. He told I-D magazine in 2010:

"Freedom for me came from the art world because it was a place where I could meet the artists. I wanted to be a social critic. I was more interested in the category of intellectual, involving art and politics and writing sometimes. But I didn't want to be a writer necessarily, I just wanted to be part of an intellectual world."

In 1989, while working at Artforum, Elien Fleiss, then a young gallery curator received a phone call from Zahm. She was looking for an art critic to write a manifesto against a journalist from a daily newspaper who she felt was writing insanities about contemporary art in general. Zahm agreed to do it, and that was the beginning of the encounter, which then became a love story. Their romance was short-lived, but their professional relationship was fruitful. In 1994, they curated "The Winter of Love," a hit show for the Museum of Modern Art in Paris that they later took to P.S. 1 in New York City. Over the next decade they continued to curate several shows together around the world, including "June" in 1993 at the Galerie Thaddaeus Ropac in Paris,"BEIGE" in 1996 at Saga Basement in Copenhagen and "La Voie Lactée" in 1998 at Alleged Gallery in New York City. These housed the likes of many renowned creatives across disciplines, including Maurizio Cattelan, Wolfgang Tillmans, Jean-Luc Vilmouth, and Claude Closky. Notably in 2000, Zahm and Fleiss curated the exposition "Elysian Fields" at the Centre Pompidou in Paris and printed a subsequent catalogue publication under the same name, displaying works from the likes of Gerard Richter and Richard Prince to Rei Kawakubo and Andrea Zittel — artists that have continued to collaborate with Zahm in exhibitions and within Purple's magazine publications.

More recent shows included "La Force de L'Art" in 2006 at Le Grand Palais in Paris, and "To Paint is to Love Again" at Los Angeles gallery Nino Mier, addressing the state of art in the digital age with works from prominent artists like Urs Fischer, Vanessa Beecroft and Paul McCarthy. His countless exhibitions have embodied the same vision as the rest of his creative pursuits, comprehending art in a radically cultural, counter-institutional context.

In May 2017, Zahm published a book in collaboration with Donation Grau titled,' Une avant-garde sans avant-garde'. The book is a collection of Zahm's most significant texts written during the last 30 years. It is above all a radical reading of art from the 1990s to the present. The anthology tries to decipher this chaotic, contradictory, oppressive, and ultra-creative period. The introductions that precede each chapter contextualize the selected texts, and develop the idea that the 1990s invented an avant-garde without an avant-garde, the issues of which are increasing and intensifying.

=== Purple ===
==== Early day's of Purple (1992–2004) ====
Zahm gravitated towards the idea of working with magazines from the conception of his career in art. In 1992 Zahm and his partner Elien Fleiss printed the first issue of Purple Prose, a Parisian literary art zine. Their goal was to create a new kind of space for artists to present their work and express their ideas; and to design a network through which people working in different disciplines, could easily access new information and each other and contributing to the early 90s alternative indie culture. Zahm liked the idea of a color sharing the title with an art magazine. Dike Blair an American artist suggested the title Purple Prose in reference to the literary term in which a prose text is so extravagant, ornate, or flowery that it breaks the flow and draws excessive attention to itself. Soon after the birth of Purple Prose, Zahm created spin-off publications like Purple Sexe, Purple Fiction and Purple Fashion. Zahm aimed at fusing together his two worlds, fashion and art, in creating Purple Fashion. A typical issue featured interviews, articles and presentations covering a wide range of topics and disciplines which include; film and video, politics, fashion, architecture, sexuality, science, photography and music. Each issue was built around a loose theme which serves to create a link between subjects-past examples have been: Indian Summer, Violet Violence, Post-Sex. With its international correspondents and cutting-edge design, Purple Prose had the distinctive feel of a truly global art zine. The texts were written in roughly equal parts French and English, without translations.

For many years the magazine was associated with a realist esthetic, that of the new photography of the early 1990s- of photographers like Juergen Teller, Terry Richardson, Wolfgang Tillmans, and Mario Sorrenti. From a visual standpoint, the magazine represented a break from 80s imagery (like Richard Avedon’s photography for Versace, for example.) From an artistic standpoint, the artists from the early 1990s were raising up against art as a capitalist fetish; they were aligning themselves with the artistic social and political practices of the 1970s—those of performance, video art, Fluxus, and the conceptual and minimalist avant-garde. The magazine was an integral part of this burgeoning context, which included the deconstruction of fashion by Martin Margiela and Comme des Garçsons; the return of subtle political art, with that of Felix Gonzalez- Torres, Maurizio Cattelan, and Philippe Parreno, among others; photography of Juergen Teller; and Harmony Korine and Larry Clark’s independent filmmaking.

==== Purple Magazine (2017–present) ====
For its 25th anniversary issue, Purple celebrated the artists and models who incarnated the spirit of the magazine through their style, attitude, and personality: Cindy Sherman, Wolfgang Tillmans, Chloe Savigny, Richard Prince, Paul McCarthy, Susan Cianciolo, Maurizio Cattelan, and more. It was the first time the magazine printed multiple covers for one issue. 25 different covers showed 25 Purple icons. It was also the first time purple distributed hard-cover magazines instead of the traditional soft-cover print. He described in the editions Edito:

“It’s been years now that younger generations don’t use magazines to express themselves — at least not the way we did back in 1992. Social media now generally satisfy the need for images, contacts, and creativity. Publishing a magazine has become so expensive… An actual print object like Purple is a luxury item, which is why new alternative magazines don’t last more than a few years, are often bought, or simply disappear. Doing a luxury magazine today is one of the paradoxes of the Instagram era, when such things cost nothing… A magazine is not an ego trip… It’s a collective work by a group of creative people who believe in the artistic value of the print media and share a similar vision. (Thanks to all of them!) Every image, every single text, the choice of paper, the layout, even the choice of typefaces matters. Everything matters… Purple is made to last. Purple is made to capture a moment every season… In this period of global Internet obsession and digital amnesia, I think that means something"

In 2017 Purple moved their US based headquarters and offices from New York City to Los Angeles.

=== Freelance editor ===
In the year 2000, Serge July, the founder and editor-in-chief of French national newspaper Libération hired Olivier Zahm to launch Liberation Style, an occasional Saturday supplement to the main paper. 15 issues were published every season until 2005.

- Issue 1: Le Retour Paris
- Issue 2: Personnalité Multiple
- Issue 3: Plein Soleil
- Issue 4: L’empire des Signes
- Issue 5: Glamour
- Issue 6: Special Creation
- Issue 7: L’autre Amérique
- Issue 8: La nuit
- Issue 9: Femmes
- Issue 10: Tokyo
- Issue 11: Milan
- Issue 12: Les Années Fatales
- Issue 13: Best of L’ete 2005
- Issue 14: Special Hommes
- Issue 15: Mystere Karl

In 2009 Chanel launched its very first magazine: 31 Rue Cambon. Chanel's goal was to combine sales and information. Karl Lagerfeld delegated the artistic direction of the magazine which was not available to the public, but instead only the private cliental of Chanel to Zahm

In 2018 Zahm designed a fanzine for Gucci’s FW2019 collection presented at Le Palace in Paris. The magazine was the 14th issue of Le Palace Magazine.

== Photography ==
Zahm credited Lagerfeld for reigniting his sentiment for taking photos in 2005. Zahm told WWD in an interview dedicated to Purple's 25th Anniversary:

"He (Lagerfeld) was buying these little digital cameras at the time, Sony Cyber-shots, a little pocket-size, flat, digital camera. He had a pile of them on his table and said: “Take this, if you’ll use it.” We had this long discussion about photography and I said, “Karl how can you want to be a photographer when you were friends with Helmut Newton because, me, I have Juergen Teller in my generation and I haven't been able to do photography since I’ve known him, because he's the best." And he said: “Olivier, shut up. You don’t understand, photography is not about getting the right picture, it’s about documenting your everyday life. Remember Warhol, do you think he was a good photographer? He always had a camera on him. Do like Warhol, do like me: Don’t let a day go by without taking a picture.”

In 2009, he began documenting his late-night partying escapades in high-contrast black-and-white photographs which appeared on Purple Diary, a notorious photo blog that would become the seed for a full Purple website. He has had shows of his photographic work at Half Gallery in New York, Colette in Paris, Leadapron in Los Angeles and The Last Gallery in Tokyo.

In addition to documenting his personal life on social media platform he continues to shoot many editorials and campaigns for various brands including Yves Saint Laurent, Chanel, Giorgio Armani, Uniqlo, Agent Provocateur, and magazines including Lui, Vogue Russia, and Kadewe among others.

In 2014, Zahm partnered with Rizzoli published O.Z. Diary, a cosmopolitan 500-page photo diary exposing the lifestyles of the creative elite through a series of intimate, autobiographical photographs. Glenn O'Brien contributed various texts for the book.

== Personal life ==
Zahm has a son, Balthus, with designer Natacha Ramsay-Levi, and a daughter, Asia, with writer Anna Dubosc. He splits his time between Los Angeles and Paris.
