= Barney Kulok =

American artist and photographer (born 1981)

Barney Kulok (born 1981) is an American artist and photographer based in New York City. His work has been exhibited internationally and is held in the collections of institutions including the Museum of Modern Art in New York.

== Early life and education ==
Kulok was born in New York City. He studied at Bard College, where he earned a Bachelor of Arts degree in 2005.

== Career ==
Kulok first received attention following his participation in Walls 'N' Things, a 2005 group exhibition of emerging artists curated by Clarissa Dalrymple at the Nicole Klagsbrun Gallery in New York. That same year, The Wall Street Journal identified him as one of the “23-Year-Old Masters,” highlighting a group of young artists gaining early recognition.

Kulok’s photographic practice explores everyday objects and environments, often presented in carefully composed black-and-white or color images. Writing in The New Yorker, critic Vince Aletti described Kulok’s photographs as “extremely self-conscious pictures of mostly ordinary things,” noting their formal precision and elegance.

In 2012, the Aperture Foundation published Kulok’s first monograph, Building: Louis I. Kahn at Roosevelt Island. Reviewing the book for Frieze, critic Chris Wiley wrote that the photographs engage with the traditions of Minimalism and Post-Minimalism while documenting architectural spaces associated with architect Louis Kahn.

Kulok has also written and edited on photography and visual culture. In 2013 he contributed the essay Reflections on the Concrete Mirror, examining relationships between photography and architecture, commissioned by Brian Sholis for Aperture magazine. In 2014 he co-edited, with artist Vik Muniz, the twentieth anniversary issue of Blind Spot magazine.

In 2016 Kulok founded Hunters Point Press in Long Island City, New York. Through the press he has published photography and art books by artists including Baldwin Lee, B. Wurtz, Jeremy Sigler, Janice Guy, Jared Bark, and Svetlana Alpers.

== Publications ==
- Building: Louis I. Kahn at Roosevelt Island. New York City: Aperture, 2012.

== Solo exhibitions ==
- Building, Shinsegae Gallery, Seoul, Incheon and Busan, South Korea, 2013
- Building, Nicole Klagsbrun Gallery, New York, 2013
- 11.11.11, Galerie Hussenot, Paris, 2011
- In Visible Cities, Nicole Klagsbrun Gallery, New York, 2009
- Galerie Hussenot, Paris, 2008
- Simple Facts, Nicole Klagsbrun Gallery, New York, 2007
- Painting Then For Now, David Krut Projects, New York (with Svetlana Alpers and James Hyde), 2007
- Emerging Artist Showcase, Heimbold Visual Arts Center, Sarah Lawrence College, Bronxville, New York, 2005
- Woods Studio, Bard College, Annandale-on-Hudson, New York, 2004

== Collections ==
Kulok’s work is included in the permanent collections of:

- Museum of Modern Art, New York
- Frances Lehman Loeb Art Center, Vassar College, Poughkeepsie, New York
