= Environmental art =

Genre of art engaging nature and ecology

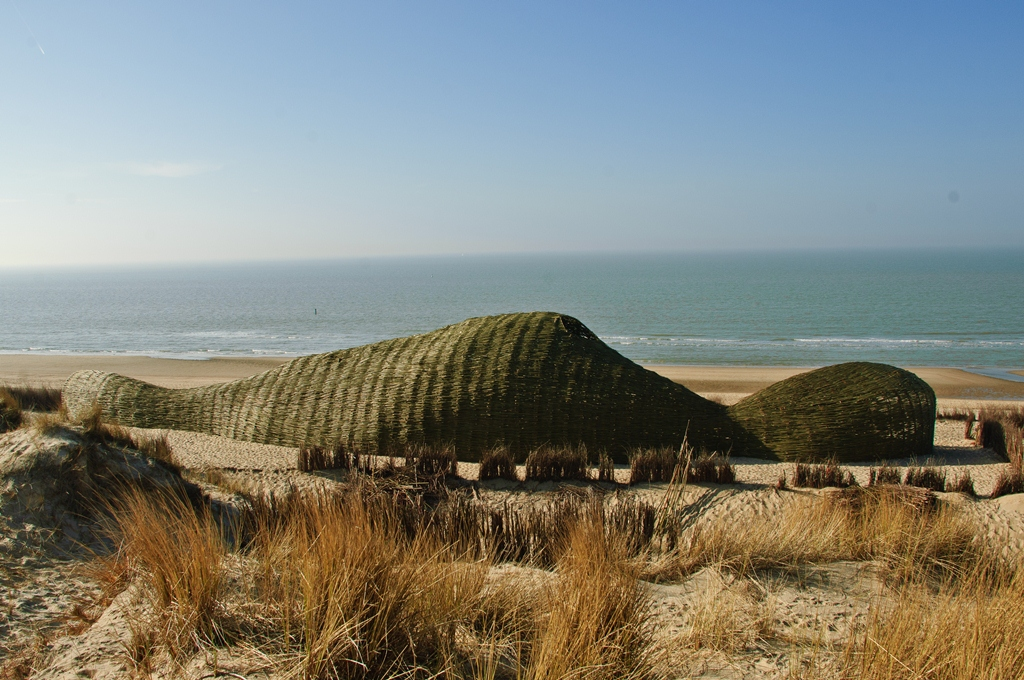
Marco Casagrande, Sandworm, Beaufort04 Triennial of Contemporary Art, Wenduine, Belgium, 2012.

Environmental art is a range of artistic practices encompassing both historical approaches to nature in art and more recent ecological and politically motivated types of works. Environmental art has evolved away from formal concerns, for example monumental earthworks using earth as a sculptural material, towards a deeper relationship to systems, processes and phenomena in relation to social concerns. Integrated social and ecological approaches developed as an ethical, restorative stance emerged in the 1990s. Environmental art has become a focal point of exhibitions around the world as the social and cultural aspects of climate change come to the forefront.

The term "environmental art" often encompasses "ecological" concerns but is not specific to them. It primarily celebrates an artist's connection with nature using natural materials. The concept is best understood in relationship to historic earth/Land art and the evolving field of ecological art. The field is interdisciplinary in the fact that environmental artists embrace ideas from science and philosophy. The practice encompasses traditional media, new media and critical social forms of production. The work embraces a full range of landscape/environmental conditions from the rural, to the suburban and urban as well as urban/rural industrial.

== History: landscape painting and representation ==
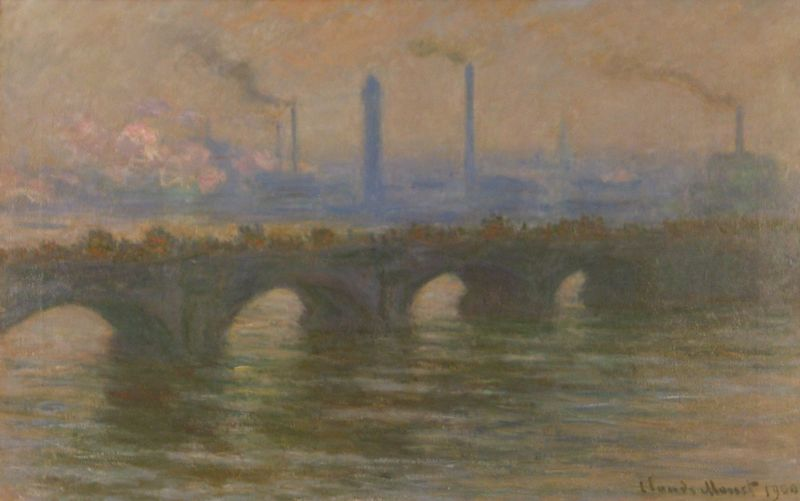
Claude Monet, Waterloo Bridge, London

Environmental art arguably began with the Paleolithic cave paintings. While no landscape paintings have yet been found, the cave paintings represented other aspects of nature important to early humans, such as animals and human figures. "They are prehistoric observations of nature. In one way or another, nature for centuries remained the preferential theme of creative art." More modern examples of environmental art stem from landscape painting and representation. When artists painted on-site they developed a deep connection with the surrounding environment and its weather and brought these close observations into their canvases. John Constable's sky paintings "most closely represent the sky in nature". Claude Monet's Houses of Parliament Series also exemplifies the artist's connection with the environment. "For me, a landscape does not exist in its own right, since its appearance changes at every moment; but the surrounding atmosphere brings it to life, the air and the light, which vary continually for me, it is only the surrounding atmosphere that gives subjects their true value."

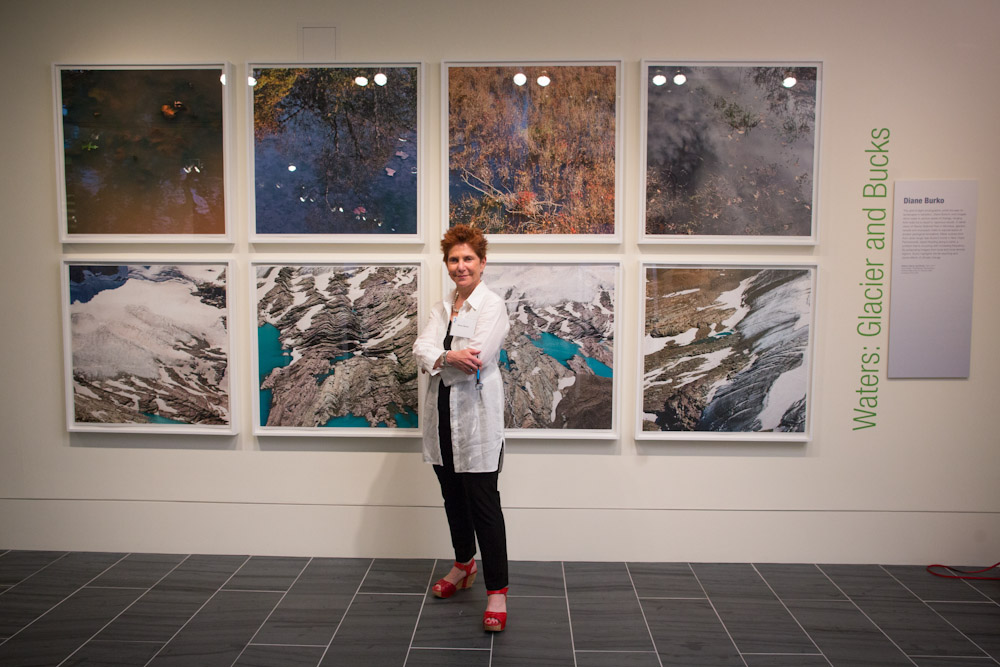
Diane Burko, Waters Glacier and Bucks, 2013

Contemporary painters, such as Diane Burko represent natural phenomena—and its change over time—to convey ecological issues, drawing attention to climate change. Alexis Rockman's landscapes depict a sardonic view of climate change and humankind's interventions with other species by way of genetic engineering.

== Challenging traditional sculptural forms ==
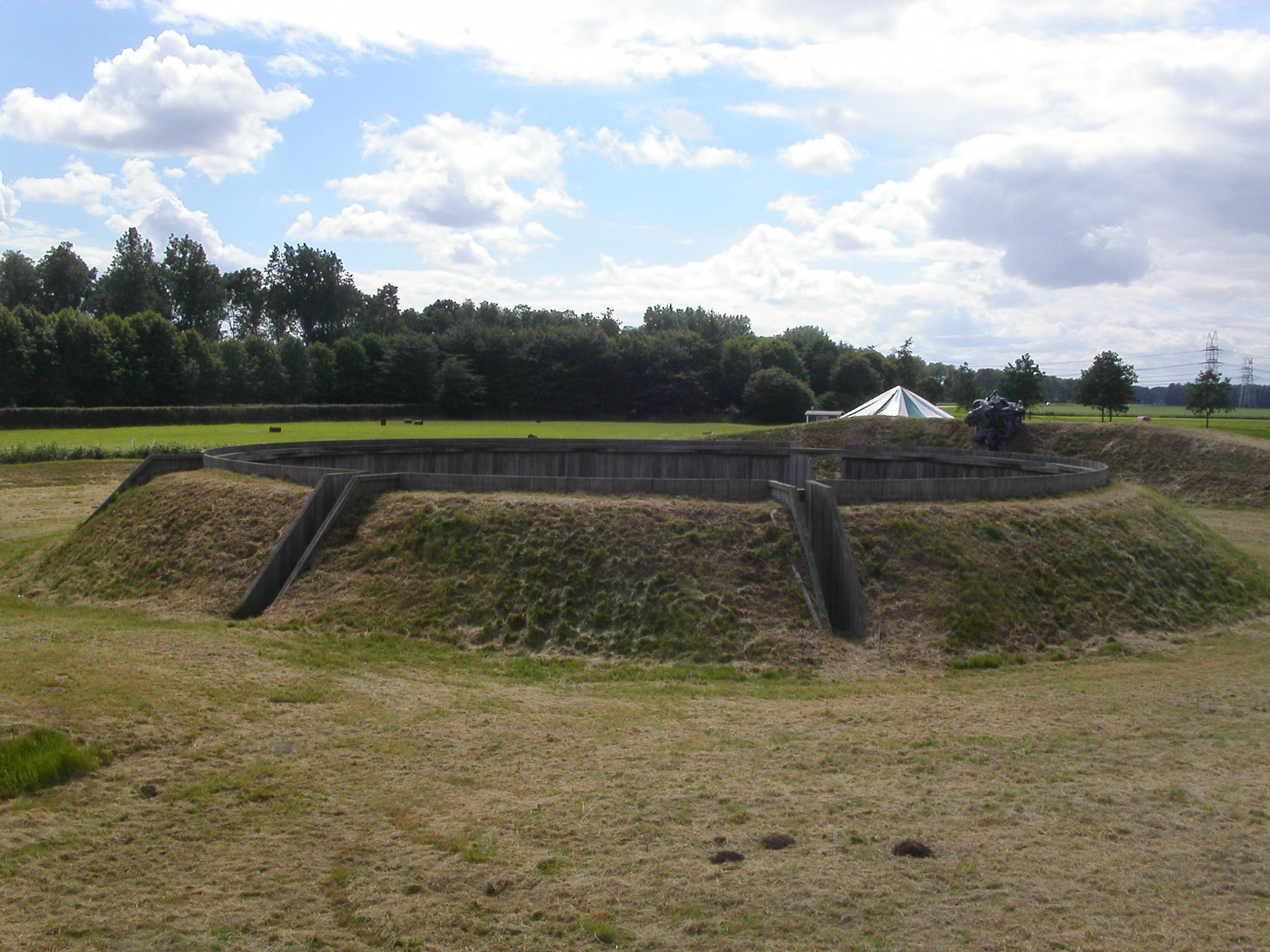
Robert Morris, Observatorium, Netherlands

The growth of environmental art as an art movement began in the late 1960s and early 1970s. In its early phases, it was most associated with sculpture—especially Site-specific art, Land art and Arte povera—having arisen out of mounting criticism of traditional sculptural forms and practices that were increasingly seen as outmoded and potentially out of harmony with the natural environment.

In October 1968, Robert Smithson organized an exhibition at Dwan Gallery in New York City, which was titled “Earthworks.” The works in the show posed an explicit challenge to conventional notions of exhibition and sales, in that they were either too large or too unwieldy to be collected; most were represented only by photographs, further emphasizing their resistance to acquisition. For these artists, escaping the confines of the gallery and modernist theory was achieved by leaving the cities and going out into the desert.

”They were not depicting the landscape, but engaging it; their art was not simply of the landscape, but in it as well.” This shift in the late 1960s and 1970s represents an avant-garde notion of sculpture, the landscape, and our relationship with it. The work challenged the conventional means to create sculpture, but also defied more elite modes of art dissemination and exhibition, such as the Dwan Gallery show mentioned earlier. This shift opened up a new space and, in doing so, expanded how work was documented and conceptualized.

== Entering public and urban spaces ==
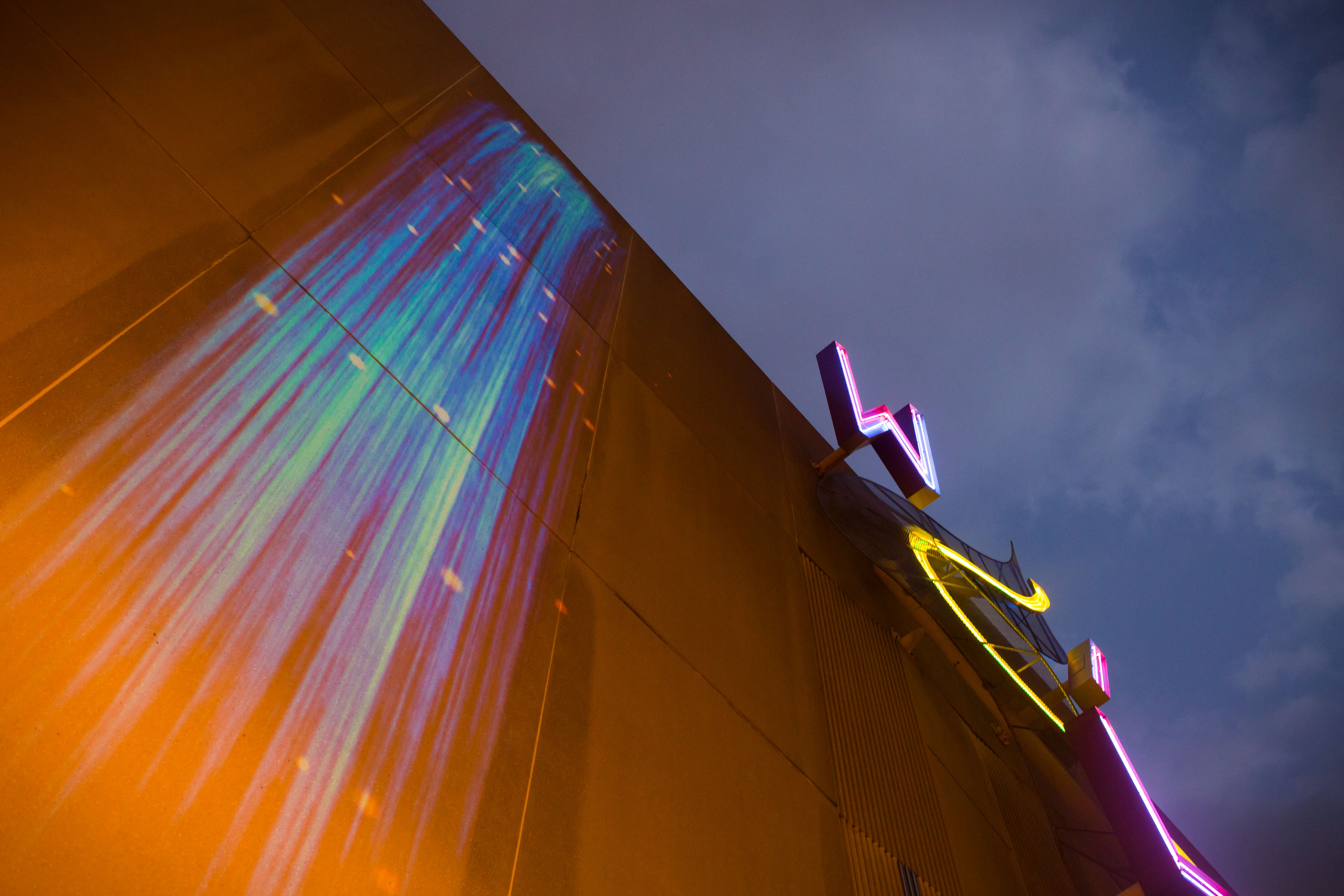
Andrea Polli, Particle Falls, 2013

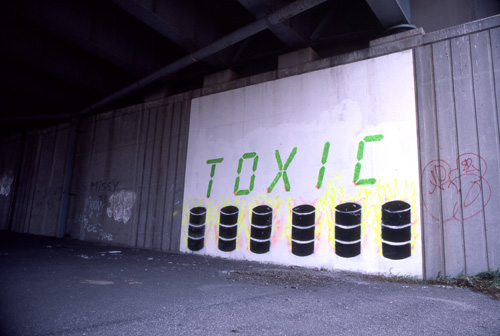
John Fekner, Toxic, Long Island Expressway, Maspeth, Queens, NY 1982

Just as the earthworks in the deserts of the west grew out of notions of landscape painting, the growth of public art stimulated artists to engage the urban landscape as another environment and also as a platform to engage ideas and concepts about the environment to a larger audience. While this earlier work was mostly created in the deserts of the American West, the end of the 1970s and the beginning of the 1980s saw works moving into the public landscape. Artists like Robert Morris began engaging county departments and public arts commissions to create works in public spaces such as an abandoned gravel pit. Herbert Bayer used a similar approach and was selected to create his Mill Creek Canyon Earthworks in 1982. The project served functions such as erosion control, a place to serve as a reservoir during high rain periods, and a 2.5-acre park during dry seasons. Lucy Lippard's groundbreaking book, on the parallel between contemporary land art and prehistoric sites, examined how these prehistoric cultures, forms, and images have "overlaid" onto the work of contemporary artists working with the land and natural systems.

In 1965, Alan Sonfist introduced a key environmentalist idea of bringing nature back into the urban environment with his first historical Time Landscape sculpture, proposed to New York City in 1965 and revealed to the public in 1978 in a mature, grown state. Time Landscape remains visible at the corner of Houston and LaGuardia in New York City's Greenwich Village. The work resulted in a "slowly developing forest that represents the Manhattan landscape inhabited by Native Americans and encountered by Dutch settlers in the early 17th century."

In 1978 the Vacant Lot of Cabbages was planted as fine art in New Zealand and was followed by many other urban environmental, food and social impacts.

Environmental art also encompasses the scope of the urban landscape. Pioneering environmental artist, Mary Miss began creating art in the urban environment with her 1969 installation, Ropes/Shore, and continues to develop projects involving extended communities through City as a Living Laboratory. Agnes Denes created a work in downtown Manhattan Wheatfield - A Confrontation (1982) in which she planted a field of wheat on the two-acre site of a landfill covered with urban detritus and rubble. The site is now Battery Park City and the World Financial Center, a transformation from ecological power to economic power.

In 1974, Bonnie Sherk created The Farm in San Francisco, a 7-acre urban garden in underused spaces below freeway overpasses. The farm, until 1980, also served as a community center and art space that provided internships, childhood ecoart education for children, and served as a public park during its six-year existence.

Andrea Polli's installation Particle Falls made particulate matter in the air visible in a way that passersby could see. For HighWaterLine Eve Mosher and others walked through neighborhoods in at-risk cities such as New York City and Miami, marking the projected flood damage which could occur as a result of climate change and talking with residents about what they were doing.

Starting in the 2010s, "guerilla gardener" Ron Finley began planting edible gardens in the urban neighborhood of South Central Los Angeles along narrow strips of dirt between the curb and sidewalk. His motivation was to address the effects of the food apartheid in certain neighborhoods, including his own, and to encourage healthy eating habits, especially among children.

== Ecoart ==
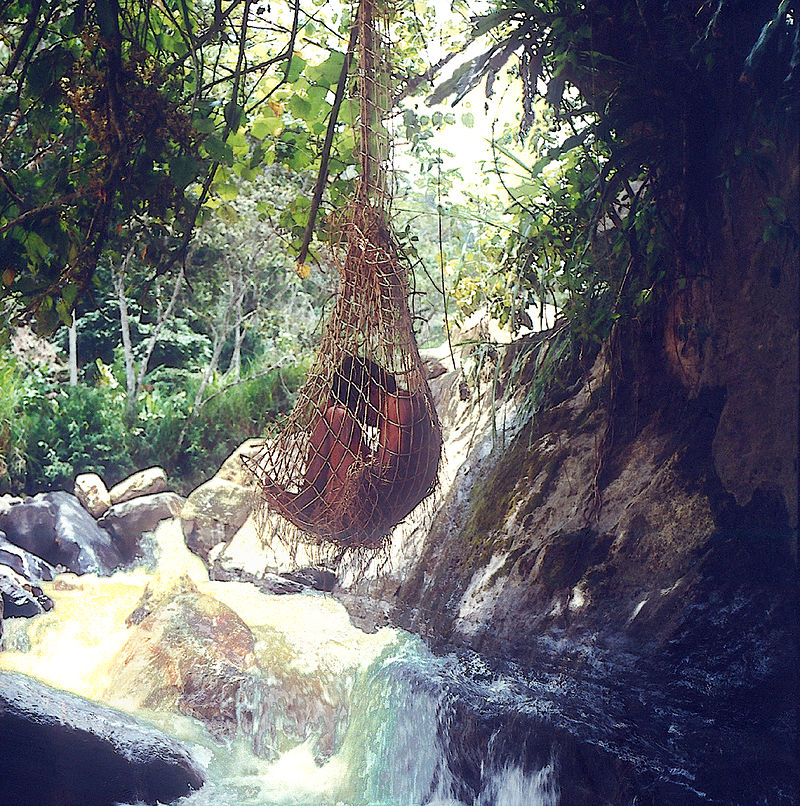
Milton Becerra, NIDOS, Táchira River, Venezuela 1995.

In general use, the term 'Eco-art' or 'Environmental art' refers loosely to a range of artistic practices and works "that explore and respond to issues related to the environment, climate change, and ecological sustainability." In more technical and academic contexts, Ecological art, also known as ecoart, tends to refer more precisely to an artistic practice or discipline proposing paradigms sustainable with the life forms and resources of Earth. It is composed of artists, scientists, philosophers and activists who are devoted to the practices of ecological art. Historical precedents include Earthworks, Land Art, and landscape painting/photography. Ecoart is distinguished by a focus on systems and interrelationships within our environment: the ecological, geographic, political, biological and cultural. Ecoart creates awareness, stimulates dialogue, changes human behavior towards other species, and encourages the long-term respect for the natural systems we coexist with. It manifests as socially engaged, activist, community-based restorative or interventionist art. Ecological artist, Aviva Rahmani believes that "Ecological art is an art practice, often in collaboration with scientists, city planners, architects and others, that results in direct intervention in environmental degradation. Often, the artist is the lead agent in that practice."

There are numerous approaches to ecoart including but not limited to: representational artworks that address the environment through images and objects; remediation projects that restore polluted environments; activist projects that engage others and activate change of behaviors and/or public policy; time-based social sculptures that involve communities in monitoring their landscapes and taking a participatory role in sustainable practices; ecopoetic projects that initiate a re-envisioning and re-enchantment with the natural world, inspiring healing and co-existence with other species; direct-encounter artworks that involve natural phenomena such as water, weather, sunlight, or plants; pedagogical artworks that share information about environmental injustice and ecological problems such as water and soil pollution and health hazards; relational aesthetics that involve sustainable, off-the-grid, permaculture existences.

There is discussion and debate among ecoartists regarding whether ecological art should be considered a discrete discipline within the arts, distinct from environmental art. A current definition of ecological art, drafted collectively by the EcoArtNetwork is "Ecological art is an art practice that embraces an ethic of social justice in both its content and form/materials. Ecoart is created to inspire caring and respect, stimulate dialogue, and encourage the long-term flourishing of the social and natural environments in which we live. It commonly manifests as socially engaged, activist, community-based restorative or interventionist art." The global community ArtTech NatureCulture, which convenes over 400 creative practitioners engaged in ecological art forms across disciplines, states: "In precarious times, how can we build new ways forward that challenge and transform the many inequalities of the status quo? Our ways of addressing this are as diverse as our backgrounds, but we are united by a shared interest in using creative practices across disciplines (from arts, design, culture and hacking to science, technology and activism) to explore alternative futures that rethink, rebuild and heal." Co-founder Kit Braybrooke has described the reason for ArtTech NatureCulture as "alone, we face climate grief and instability, but together, we rebuild."

Artists who work in this field generally subscribe to one or more of the following principles: focus on the web of interrelationships in the environment—on the physical, biological, cultural, political, and historical aspects of ecological systems; create works that employ natural materials or engage with environmental forces such as wind, water, or sunlight; reclaim, restore, and remediate damaged environments; inform the public about ecological dynamics and the environmental problems we face; revise ecological relationships, creatively proposing new possibilities for coexistence, sustainability, and healing.

Contributions by women in the area of EcoArt are significant. Many are cataloged in WEAD, the Women Environmental Artists Directory, founded in 1995 by Jo Hanson, Susan Leibovitz Steinman and Estelle Akamine. The work of ecofeminist writers inspired early male and female practitioners to address their concerns about a more horizontal relationship to environmental issues in their practices. The feminist art writer Lucy Lippard, writing for the Weather Report Show she curated in 2007 at the Boulder Museum of Contemporary Art, which included many environmental, ecological and ecofeminist artists, commented on how many of those artists were women.

== Considering environmental impact ==
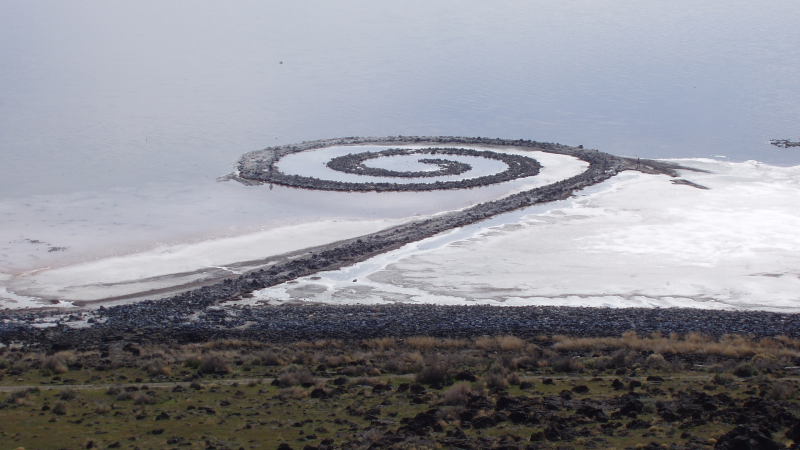
Robert Smithson, Spiral Jetty, 2005.

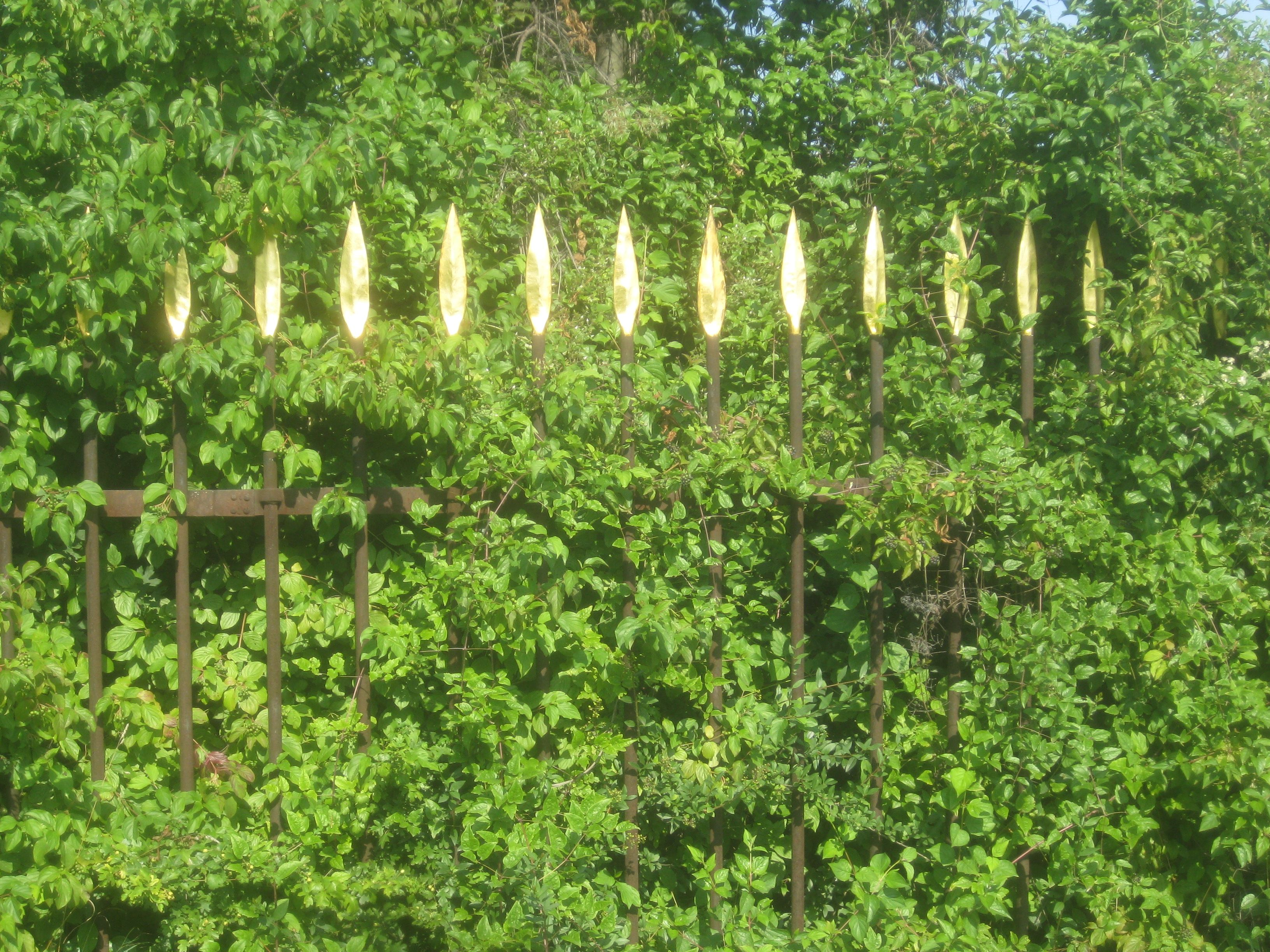
herman de vries, Sanctuarium, Leibfriedschen Garten, Stuttgart, 2013.

Within environmental art, a crucial distinction can be made between environmental artists who do not consider the possible damage to the environment that their artwork may incur and those whose intent is to cause no harm to nature. For example, despite its aesthetic merits, the American artist Robert Smithson's celebrated sculpture Spiral Jetty (1969) inflicted permanent damage upon the landscape he worked with, using a bulldozer to scrape and cut the land, with the spiral itself impinging upon the lake. Similarly, criticism was raised against the European sculptor Christo when he temporarily wrapped the coastline at Little Bay, south of Sydney, Australia, in 1969. Conservationists' comments attracted international attention in environmental circles and led contemporary artists in the region to rethink the inclinations of land art and site-specific art.

Sustainable art is produced with consideration for the wider impact of the work and its reception in relationship to its environments (social, economic, biophysical, historical, and cultural). Some artists choose to minimize their potential impact, while others' work involves restoring the immediate landscape to a natural state.

British sculptor Richard Long has, for several decades, made temporary outdoor sculptural work by rearranging natural materials found on site, such as rocks, mud, and branches, which will therefore have no lingering detrimental effect. Chris Drury instituted a work entitled "Medicine Wheel" which was the result of a daily meditative walk, once a day, for a calendar year. The deliverable of this work was a mandala of mosaicked found objects: nature art as process art.

Leading environmental artists such as British artist and poet, Hamish Fulton, Dutch sculptor Herman de Vries, the Australian sculptor John Davis and the British sculptor Andy Goldsworthy similarly leave the landscape they have worked with unharmed; in some cases they have revegetated damaged land with appropriate indigenous flora in the process of making their work. In this way, the work of art arises out of a sensitivity towards habitat.

Perhaps the most celebrated instance of environmental art in the late 20th century was 7000 Oaks, an ecological action staged at Documenta during 1982 by Joseph Beuys, in which the artist and his assistants highlighted the condition of the local environment by planting 7000 oak trees throughout and around the city of Kassel.

== Ecological awareness, eco-art, and transformation ==
The potential role of art/eco-art in engendering socio-environmental transformation is becoming more widely discussed, as are the systemic obstacles to that transformation. In considering how society might be inspired, via its artworks, to respond positively to eco-crisis and change itself accordingly, some eco-artists reflect on our human engagement with the natural world, and create ecologically informed art that focuses on (or helps us to visualise) eco-friendly transformation or reclamation. For instance, eco-art writer and theoretician Linda Weintraub (who coined the term "cycle-logical" to describe the correlation between recycling and psychology) reminds us that the 21st-century notion of artists' mindful engagement with their materials harkens back to Paleolithic midden piles of discarded pottery and metals from ancient civilizations.

Weintraub cites the work of MacArthur Fellow Sarah Sze who recycles, reuses, and refurbishes detritus from the waste stream into elegant sprawling installations: this self-reflective work draws our attention to (and thereby initiates a critique of) our own cluttered lives and connection to consumer culture. A 2024 article by Bridie Lonie describes changes in approaches to environmental art from the 1970s to our present—including the intervention art piece "Vacant Lot of Cabbages" and a discussion of the anthropocene as an emergent, interdisciplinary concept, theorising artists’ engagement with the weather, theorising the role of the artwork within activism, “Interrupting the Automatism” in the activation of public space, and landscape as the provider of new eyes.

There are now countless other examples of eco-art globally that raise eco-awareness and establish new, precursor perceptual platforms that might contribute to societal or psychological change. Brigitte Hitschler's Energy field, for instance, drew power for 400 red diodes from the to-be-reclaimed potash slag heap upon which they were installed, using art and science to reveal hidden material culture. Ecological artist and activist, Beverly Naidus, creates installations that address environmental crises, nuclear legacy issues, and creates works on paper that envision transformation. Her community-based permaculture project, Eden Reframed, remediates degraded soil using phytoremediation and mushrooms resulting in a public place to grow and harvest medicinal plants and edible plants. Naidus is an educator having taught at the University of Washington, Tacoma for over ten years, where she created the Interdisciplinary Studio Arts in Community curriculum merging art with ecology and socially engaged practices. Naidus's book, Arts for Change: Teaching Outside the Frame is a resource for teachers, activists and artists.

Sculptor and installation artist Erika Wanenmacher was inspired by Tony Price in her development of works addressing creativity, mythology, and New Mexico's nuclear presence. Oregon-based artist and arborist Richard Reames uses grafting techniques to produce his works of arborsculpture and arbortecture. He uses time-based processes of multiple plantings of trees that are then shaped by bending, pruning, grafting, in ways that are similar to pleaching and espalier. These works have ecological advantages, including carbon dioxide sequestration, habitat creation, and climate change mitigation.

== Renewable energy sculpture ==
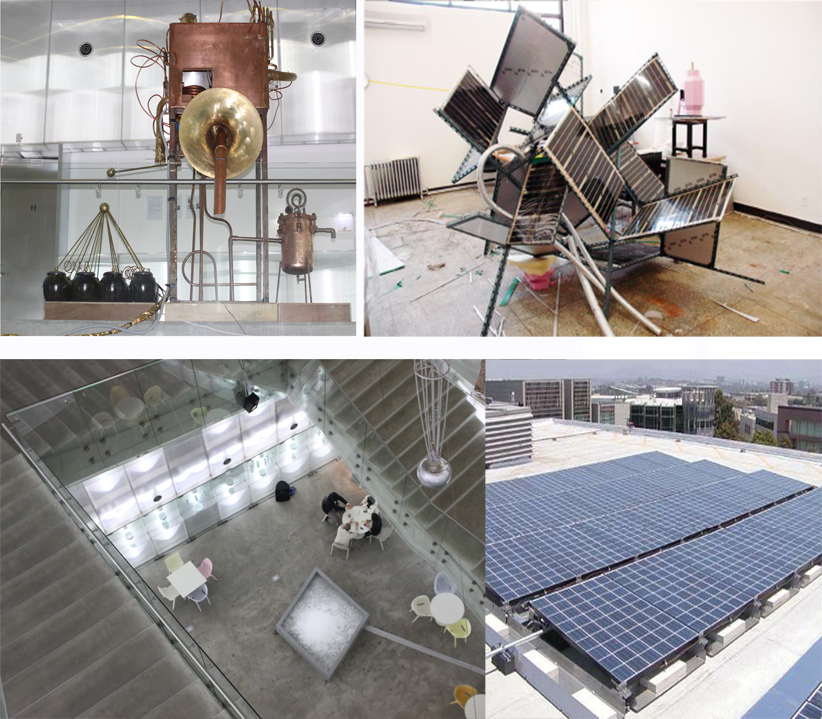
Ralf Sander, World Saving Machine III, MoA Museum of Art, Seoul, South Korea.

The renewable energy sculpture is another recent development in environmental art. In response to the growing concern about global climate change, artists are designing explicit interventions at a functional level, merging aesthetic responses with the functional properties of energy generation or saving. Practitioners of this emerging area often work according to ecologically informed ethical and practical codes that conform to ecodesign criteria.

Andrea Polli's Queensbridge Wind Power Project is an example of experimental architecture, incorporating wind turbines into a bridge's structure to recreate aspects of the original design as well as lighting the bridge and neighbouring areas. Ralf Sander's public sculpture, the World Saving Machine, used solar energy to create snow and ice outside the Seoul Museum of Art in the hot Korean summer.

== See also ==
- BioArt
- Crop art
- Ecodesign
- Ecofeminist art
- Ecological art
- Ecopsychology
- Ecovention
- Environmental movement
- Environmental sculpture
- Environmentalism
- Land art
- Process art
- Site-specific art
- Solarpunk
- Sustainable art
- Sustainable design
