= Ecological art =

Genre of art engaging ecological systems

Ecological art, or ecoart, is an art genre and artistic practice that seeks to preserve, remediate and/or vitalize the life forms, resources and ecology of Earth. Ecological art practitioners do this by applying the principles of ecosystems to living species and their habitats throughout the lithosphere, atmosphere, biosphere, and hydrosphere, including wilderness, rural, suburban and urban locations. Ecological art is a distinct genre from environmental art in that it involves functional ecological systems-restoration, as well as socially engaged, activist, community-based interventions. Ecological art also addresses politics, culture, economics, ethics and aesthetics as they impact the conditions of ecosystems. Ecological art practitioners include artists, scientists, philosophers and activists who often collaborate on restoration, remediation and public awareness projects.

== Historical precedents ==
Art historical precedents include environmental art, earthworks, land art, sustainable art, landscape painting, intervention art and landscape photography. While historical examples may reach back to Neolithic times, according to the history published in the book, Ecovention: current art to transform ecologies, a short list of key works include Herbert Bayer's Grass Mound (1955) at the Aspen Art Institute, Aspen, CO; Joseph Beuys 1962 proposed action to clean up the Elbe River in Hamburg, German; Hans Haacke's 1965 manifesto for time-based, "natural", dynamic indeterminate art; Nicolas Uriburu's 1968 performance "Green Power, coloration Grand Canal – Venice" and Agnes Denes's 1968 performance, Haiku Poetry Burial, Rice Planting and Tree Chaining/Exercises in Eco-Logic, in Sullivan County, New York.

1969 was a watershed year for ecological art practices. Landmark accomplishments include Haacke's Grass Grows in Ithaca, NY; Alan Sonfist's activities articulating the significance of native forests in urban areas; and his action to monitor air quality in New York City. Betty Beaumont documented the clean-up of what was the worst U.S. ocean oil spill off the coast of Santa Barbara, California, while Mierle Laderman Ukeles wrote Manifesto for Maintenance Art (Spaid) In 1969, the John Gibson Gallery in New York city mounted the exhibition, Ecologic Art, that included the work of Will Insley, Claes Oldenburg, Christo, Peter Hutchinson, Dennis Oppenheim, Robert Morris, Robert Smithson, Carl Andre, Jan Dibbets, and Richard Long.

In 1969–1970, Helen Mayer Harrison and Newton Harrison collaborated on mapping endangered species around the world. From 1972 to 1979, Helen and Newton Harrison realize seven projects designed for and about lagoons in California.

In 1971, artist Bonnie Sherk performs Public Lunch with the Animals in the Lion House of the San Francisco Zoo. She went on to found The Farm (also known as Crossroads Community in 1974 in San Francisco. The project involved growing edible crops as environmental sculpture; livestock were also raised there and it also served as a performance art venue and community education center. In 1978, in New Zealand, the Vacant Lot of Cabbages was planted in the CBD of the capital city Wellington and was cited as an early Anthropocene work of art.

The 1972 essay, Art and Ecological Consciousness by György Kepes in his book, Arts of the Environment. presents the genre as distinct from environmental art. In the 1992 exhibition and book, Fragile Ecologies: Contemporary Artists' Interpretations and Solutions, art historian, Dr. Barbara Matilsky differentiates ecological art from environmental art in that the former has ethical underpinnings. In 1993, a workshop and exhibition, specifically about ecological systems and art, was presented by Don Krug, Renee Miller and Barbara Westfall at the Society for Ecological Restoration in Irvine, California. The term ecovention, was coined in 1999 as a conjunction of the words ecology and intervention, in conjunction with an exhibition of the same name curated by Amy Lipton and Sue Spaid, representing artist's projects that use inventive strategies to physically transform a local ecology. In a 2006 UNESCO research report for the Art in Ecology think tank on arts and sustainability, "Mapping the Terrain of Contemporary EcoArt Practice and Collaboration", the artist Beth Carruthers uses the term Ecoart.

A current definition of ecological art drafted collectively by the EcoArt Network of international artists, founded in 1998, is "an art practice that embraces an ethic of social justice in both its content and form/materials. EcoArt is created to inspire caring and respect, stimulate dialogue, and encourage the long-term flourishing of the social and natural environments in which we live. It commonly manifests as socially engaged, activist, community-based restorative or art intervention."

More recently contemporary artists like Parvez M. Taj, Eve Mosher, Michael Singer (artist), Patricia Johanson and more embrace ecological art as their medium of expression.

== Theories ==
The 2012 book, Toward Global (Environ)Mental Change – Transformative Art and Cultures of Sustainability, proposes that the global crisis of unsustainability is a disruption of the hardware of civilization, as well as a crisis of the software of the human mind. Art and Climate Change: Separate Bubbles or Mutual Membrane? theorises three key obstacles to environment-oriented change (bad ‘memes’, ‘Radical Inertia’, ‘Framed Questions’) and explores the possible role of eco-art in exposing and dissolving those obstacles. The 2004 book, Ecological aesthetics: art in environmental design: theory and practice, presents an analysis of a variety of tendencies and approaches to landscape architecture, science and theory that inform research and the transformation of the landscape for over thirty years.

Green Arts Web, compiled by Carnegie Mellon University senior librarian, Mo Dawley, is a compendium of core readings on contemporary environmental art, ecological art and theory (20th century to the present) that includes, among other sub-categories, for example, deep ecology practices; ecofeminism; ecopsychology; land ethic and bioregionalism; sense of place; and systems thinking.

== Principles ==
Artists considered to be working within this field subscribe to one or more of the following principles:

- Focus on the web of interrelationships in our environment—on the physical, biological, cultural, political, and historical aspects of ecological systems.
- Create works that employ natural materials or engage with environmental forces such as wind, water, or sunlight.
- Reclaim, restore, and remediate damaged environments.
- Inform the public about ecological dynamics and the environmental problems we face.
- Revise ecological relationships, creatively proposing new possibilities for coexistence, sustainability, and healing.

== Approaches ==
Ecological art involves numerous diverse approaches, including:

- Representational artwork: reveals information and conditions through image-making and object-making with the intention of stimulating dialogue.
- Remediation projects: reclaim or restore polluted and disrupted environments – these artists often work with environmental scientists, landscape architects and urban planners.
- Activist and protest art: engage, inform, energize and activate change of behaviors and/or public policy.
- Social sculptures: are socially engaged, time-based artwork that involve communities in monitoring their landscapes, and take a participatory role in sustainable practices and lifestyles.
- Ecopoetic art: initiate a re-envisioning of the natural world, inspiring co-existence with other species.
- Direct encounter artworks: utilize natural phenomena such as water, weather, sunlight, plants, etc.
- Didactic or pedagogical works: share information about environmental injustice and ecological problems such as water and soil pollution and health hazards through education.
- Lived-and-relational aesthetics: involve sustainable, off-the-grid, permaculture existences.

== Orientations ==
Contemporary ecological art has been articulated across interdisciplinary and scholarly groups in terms of life-centered issues, community participation, public dialogue, and ecological sustainability. In 1996, the educator and activist Don Krug identified concepts frequently addressed by ecological artists that can be used by to interpret ecological perspectives and practices.

The following four orientations were identified: Environmental design, ecological design, ecological restoration, and social restoration.

- Environmental design/Sustainable design – Some artists work with nature as a resource for particular aesthetic endeavors. Artists with an orientation to environmental design are interested in achieving particular formal aesthetic effects. In the 1980s and 90s, artists, architects, designers, and civil engineers explored ways to link art, aesthetics, ecology, and culture.
- Ecological design – Artists who work in the area of ecological design create art that is contingent on direct experiences and interactions with a particular place where the art is created. An ecological view of design considers the artwork within larger contexts of how people, plants, and animals are interconnected with each other, the site, and/or the earth.
- Ecological restoration – Some artists attempt to alert viewers to environmental issues and problems through scientific exploration and educational documentation. They seek to restore fragile places and educate the public to the systemic character of bioregions through the use of communication, ritual, and performance. Some ecological artists engage people directly in activities or actions by confronting environmentally unhealthy practices with social, ethical, and moral ecological concerns.
- Social restoration – An ecological ethic where humans live in relationship to larger communities of life to catalyze socially responsible artwork. Socio-ecological artists critically examine everyday life experiences. These artists scrutinize relations of power that produce community tensions about ecological issues.

== See also ==
- Ecofeminist art
- Environmental art
- Land art
- Sustainable design
- Ecological design
- Arnold Berleant
- Zeng Fanren
- Nicola Perullo
- Michael Singer (artist)

== Bibliography ==
- Adams, Clive, Environmental Art: A Brief Introduction Centre for Contemporary Art and the Natural World, 2002.
- Beardsley, John. Earthworks and Beyond: Contemporary Art in the Landscape, Abbeville Press, 1989 and 2008.
- Berleant, Arnold, ed., Environment and the Arts. Ashgate, 2002.
- Braddock, Alan C. A Keener Perception: Ecocritical Studies in American Art History, University of Alabama Press, 2009.
- Boetzkes, Amanda. The Ethics of Earth Art. Minneapolis; London: University of Minnesota Press, 2010.
- Brown, Andrew, Art & Ecology Now, Thames & Hudson, 2014.
- Cheetham, Mark A. Landscape into Eco Art: Articulations of Nature since the '60s. Penn State UP, 2018.
- Demos, T.J. and Francesco Manacorda, Radical Nature: Art and Architecture for a Changing Planet, Walter Koenig, 2010.
- Giannachi, Gabriella and Nigel Stewart, eds. Performing Nature: Explorations in Ecology and the Arts, Peter Lang, 2005.
- Kagan, Sasha and Volker Kirchberg, Sustainability: A New Frontier For The Arts And Cultures, Verlag Fur Akademisch, 2008.
- Kastner, Jeffrey, ed. Nature (Whitechapel: Documents of Contemporary Art) 2012.
- Lippard, Lucy. Undermining a Wild Ride Through Land Use, Politics, and Art in the Changing West. The New Press, 2014.
- Marsching, Jane and Andrea Polli, eds. Far Field: Digital Culture, Climate Change and the Poles, Intellect, 2012.
- Miles, Malcolm, Eco-Aesthetics: Art, Literature and Architecture in a Period of Climate Change (Radical Aesthetics, Radical Art), 2014.
- Smith, Stephanie and Victor Margolin, eds. Beyond Green, Smart Museum of Art, 2007.
- Sonfist, Alan, Nature, the End of Art: Environmental Landscapes, Gli Ori, 2004.
- Strelow, Heike. Ecological Aesthetics: Art in Environmental Design: Theory and Practice. Initiated by Herman Prigann. Birkhäuser, 2004.
- Szerszyski B, W. Heim W & C. Waterton. Nature Performed: Environment, Culture and Performance. Blackwell, 2003.
