= Aviva Rahmani =

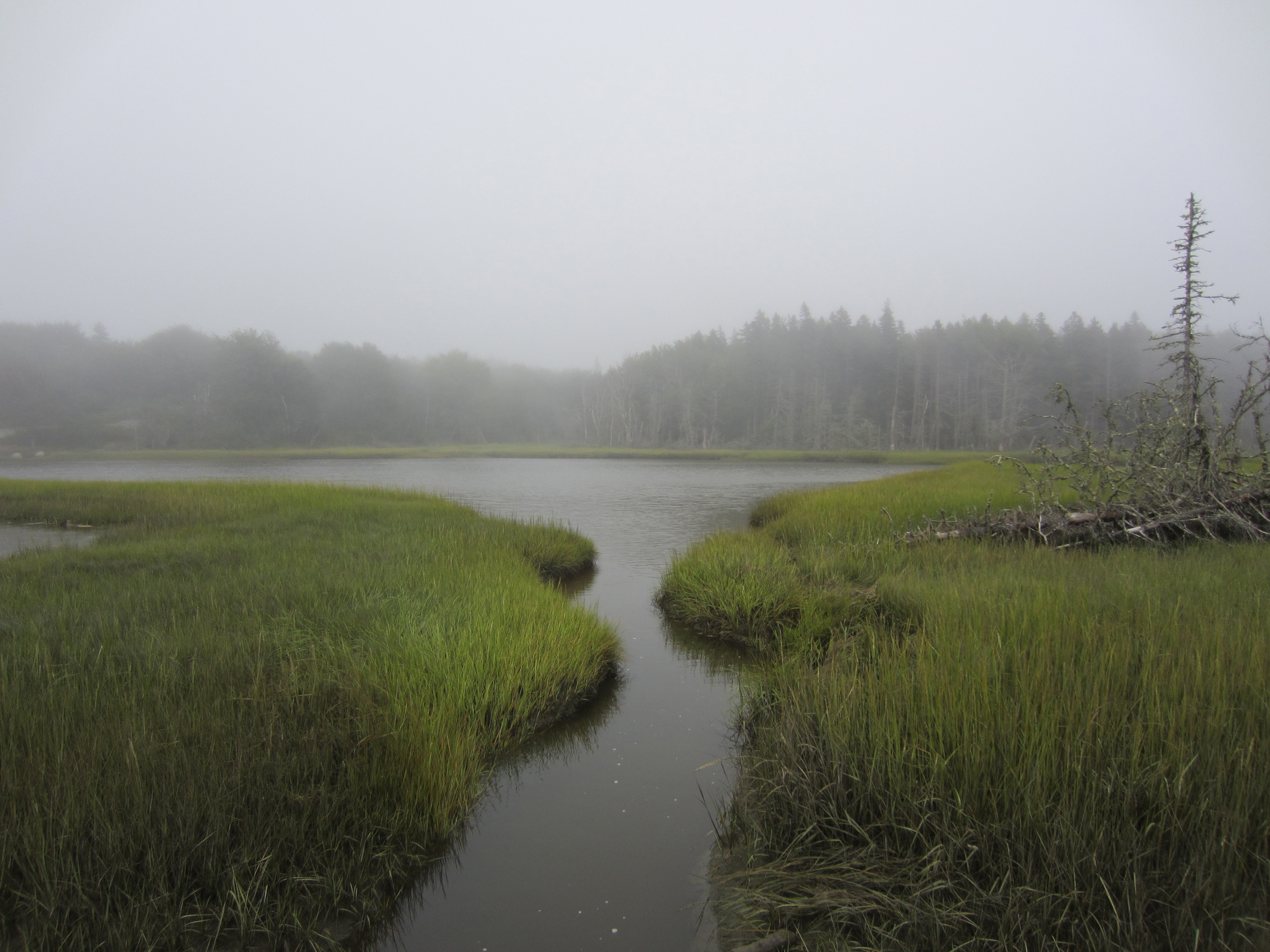
Aviva Rahmani's Blue Rocks project (2002) drew attention to a degraded estuary on Vinalhaven Island, Maine. The USDA then contributed over $500 000. to restore twenty-six acres of wetlands in 2002. (Photograph by Aviva Rahmani)

Aviva Rahmani is an Ecological artist whose public and ecological art projects have involved collaborative interdisciplinary community teams with scientists, planners, environmentalists and other artists. Her projects range from complete landscape restorations to museum venues that reference painting, sound and photography.

Early influences on her work include her interdisciplinary Classical studies at NYU, engagement in activism, as with the Bread and Puppet Theatre, her work in city planning in San Diego County in the 1980s and Vinalhaven Island, Maine in the 1990s, and the merging of science with aesthetics.

== Education ==
Rahmani attended the Cooper Union School of Art and Architecture, and got her MA from the California Institute of the Arts, Valencia, California on a scholarship and stipend to work with Allan Kaprow and Morton Subotnick, receiving a double degree in multi-media and electronic music. Rahmani has taught, lectured and performed internationally, and is the recipient of numerous grants and fellowships including two from the Nancy H. Gray Foundation for Art in the Environment in 1999 and 2000. More recently, Rahmani concurrently studied for a GIS certificate at Lehman College, CUNY, while finishing a dissertation at Plymouth University, UK.

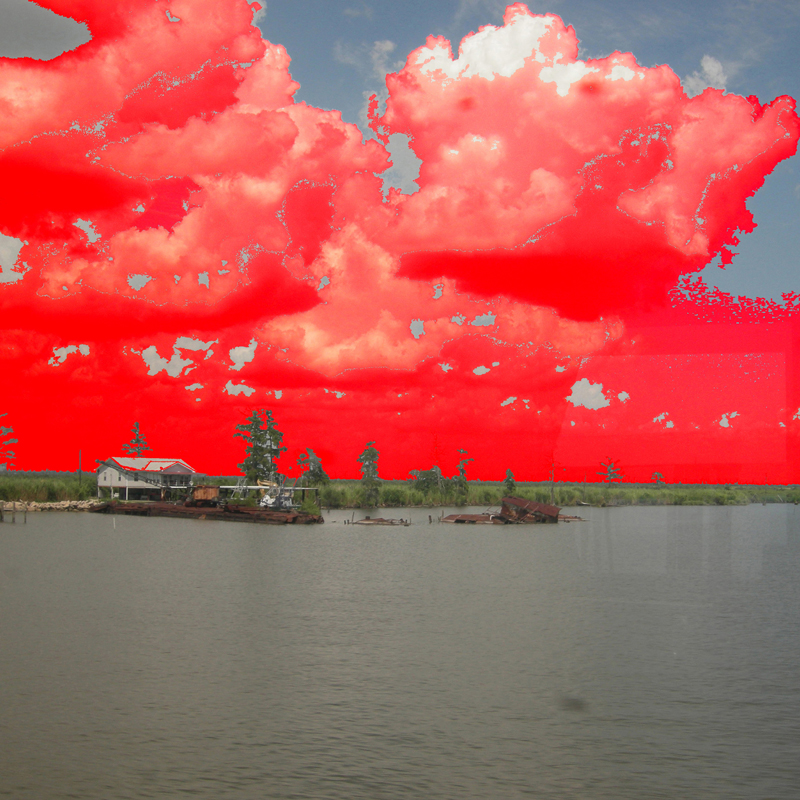
Warming Skies Over the Louisiana Bayous Seen from a Train Window digital photographic print on aluminum, 48" x 48", 2009. (Photograph by Aviva Rahmani)

== Biography ==
Rahmani's background in performance and conceptual art begin with her founding and directing the performance group the American Ritual Theatre (1968- 1971). In 1971, she collaborated with Judy Chicago, Suzanne Lacy, and Sandi Orgel on Ablutions, now considered a groundbreaking feminist performance work on rape (Chicago, Judy Through the Flower).

In 1999, Rahmani was a founding member of the Eco-art Dialog, an international collective of ecological art practitioners.

Rahmani has received numerous grants and fellowships including two from the Nancy H. Gray Foundation for Art in the Environment and a 2009 award for her work on water from the Arts and Healing Network.

== Work ==
Rahmani has performed and exhibited work at numerous venues, including the Hudson River Museum, Exit Art, and the Cincinnati Contemporary Arts Center (Ecovention, exhibition) in Ohio.

One of Rahmani's best known works is Ghost Nets 1990-2000 (Tallmer, Kagan, Carruthers, Genocchio), which includes her original theories of environmental restoration and trigger point theory. In 2012, she applied trigger point theory and the "Gulf to Gulf" webcasts to "Fish Story Memphis," a multi-part public art project designed for “Memphis Social,” curated by Tom McGlynn (2013) (Memphis is the Center of the World).

In 2006, Rahmani initiated a series of podcasts, "Virtual Cities and Oceans of If", which segued into webcasts on climate change. She is currently an Affiliate with the Institute of Arctic and Alpine Research at the University of Colorado Boulder, Colorado (UCB), where she has been collaborating with the Director, James White since 2007 on, "Gulf to Gulf," a series of webcasts on global warming with other scientists, artists and thinkers. Their first collaborative work premiered with Cultura21 in the Joseph Beuys Pavilion of the 2007 Venice Biennale.

In 2007, Rahmani in collaboration with White appeared in the collective exhibition Weather Report, debuting her titled work “Trigger Points, Tipping Points.” Rahmani displayed a series of digital prints that superimposed satellite imagery with textual warnings on the morphing and changing of climate change on the global landscape. Her work embodies a discourse that focuses on the power dynamics of disaster and how rising sea levels will not only effect landscape, but also result in the relocation of communities and refugee migration. Rahmani seamlessly ties together climate change with the themes of class, power, and justice — a conversation not as prevalent in the global warming conversation.

In 2009, Rahmani served as a formal observer for University of Colorado Boulder at the COP15 and blogged about her experience for High Tide, an arts collective based in Liverpool, UK.

Rahmani's current work reflects her interest in the application of mapping analysis, to "explore potential solutions for urban and rural water degradation in large landscapes."

Rahmani's recent work also uses the internet "to perform residencies without the international travel that spews jet fuel over the earth's waters." Virtual Cities and Oceans of If and the ongoing Virtual Concerts address global warming and geo-political conflicts by demonstrating, analyzing and interpreting the local impact of global warming at international real world sites.

As of 2018, Rahmani used her projects "The Blued Trees Symphony" and "The Blued Trees" in order to protect the locations of proposed pipeline constructions in New York, Virginia, and West Virginia through the Visual Artists Rights Act (VARA). Rahmani painted the trees in these locations blue with casein paint in the shape of a sine wave. The paint is safe for trees and promotes moss growth. The forest trees were painted in ⅓-mile-long measures. From an overhead view, it would represent her copywritable sheet music. Rahmani also submitted this work for copyright. "The Blued Trees" did not make it into a court trial, but there was a mock trial. In the mock trial, Rahmani worked with A Blade of Grass, in which "The Blued Trees Symphony" was fighting a gas company.

== Recognition ==
Rahmani's work has won numerous grants and fellowships and been written about internationally. She is an affiliate with the Institute for Arctic and Alpine Research at the University of Colorado at Boulder, gained her PhD from the University of Plymouth, UK, and received her BFA and MFA at the California Institute of the Arts.

== Early life ==
Rahmani's family traveled throughout her teen years, exposing her to many landscapes and cultures. Those early travels fostered a deep interest in her about how history inflects understanding and allowed her to consider how genocide and ecocide merge. As she matured, she came to understand the implications of how the personal is political and manifests in art.

== Awards ==
- 2020 MAP Fund Grant, From the Multi-Arts Production (MAP) Fund supported by the Doris Duke Charitable Foundation and the Andrew W. Mellon Foundation, New York City, NY
- 2019 - 2020 LMCC Artist Residency, Lower Manhattan Cultural Council (LMCC) at LMCC’s Arts Center at Governors Island, New York, NY
- 2018 Arts & Humanities Grant, From the Maine Humanities Council (Portland, ME) in partnership with the Maine Arts Commission (Augusta, ME)
- 2017 ABOG Fellow for Contemplative Practice, (Inaugural) in partnership with the Hemera Foundation, (for work on Blued Trees), A Blade of Grass (ABOG) foundation, Brooklyn, NY
- 2016 - 2019 Ethelwyn Doolittle Justice and Outreach Fund of the Community Church of New York Unitarian Universalist, For Blued Trees (renewed 3 years following initial award, maximum offered), New York, NY
- 2016 NYFA Fellowship (Architecture/ Environmental Structures/ Design), New York Foundation for the Arts, New York, NY
- 2015 NEA Ecology Residency, ISCP International Studio & Curatorial Program, Brooklyn, NY
- 2010–present Affiliate with the Institute for Arctic and Alpine Research (INSTAAR)

At the University of Colorado Boulder, CO

- 2010–present NYFA Fiscal Sponsorship, New York Foundation for the Arts, New York, NY

== Interviews ==
- Chasing the Light, Guest on environmental podcast Outside/In interviewed by Taylor Quimby, Dec 19, 2019
- The Art of Protecting Lands: Aviva Rahmani, Guest on State Of The Art podcast, April 11, 2019
- The Sarah West Love Show, Guest with Gale Elston and Robin Scully, live radio conversation, April 2, 2019
- Using ecological art to spark environmental conservation, Guest on the Green Dreamer podcast, with Kamea Chayne, episode # 154, July 11, 2019
- Artist Blocked Pipeline with Blued Trees Symphony, Interview by Mitch Ratcliffe for the Podcast Earth911 May 8, 2018
- Making the trees sing: Using art to try to stop pipelines, Guest on Day 6 hosted by Brent Bambury CBC Radio, April 27, 2018
- Can Art Stop a Pipeline?, A Blade of Grass Film, Produced and Directed by RAVA Films and A Blade of Grass
- Artist Series: Aviva Rahmani’s work with VARA, land use and environmental law, Interview with Steve Schindler & Katie Wilson-Milne for The Art Law podcast, November 8, 2018
- PIPELINE - 19 - BLUED TREES – REVISED, Director, Marino, Colmano. A Lucid Media Production, YouTube, Nov 12, 2016
- Feed the Green: Feminist Voices for this Earth, Director Jane Caputi, produced by Susan Rosenkranz, distributed by Women Make Movies.

== Chapters in Books ==
Organizing the Approach in “Ecoart in Action,” an Anthology of writings About Teaching Ecological Art, edited by Christopher Fremantle, Amara Geffen, Aviva Rahmani and Ann Rosenthal. New York: New Village Press/ New York University Press. 2022.

Blued Trees as Policy: art, law, science and the Anthropocene in Art, Theory and Practice in the Anthropocene Edited by Julie Reiss, Wilmington, Delaware: Vernon Press. 2019.

Rocks, Radishes, Restoration: on the relationships between clean water and healthy soil Aviva Rahmani and Ray Weil in Field to Palette Edited by Alex Toland, Jay Stratton Noller and Gerd Wessolek, Boca Raton: CRC Press. 2018.

1000x Landscape Architecture, Germany: Braun. 2009.

The Butterfly Effect of Hummingbirds: environmental triage: disturbance theory, trigger points, and virtual analogs for physical sites in Sustainability: a new frontier for the arts and cultures Edited by Sacha Kagan and Volker Kirchberg, Waldkirchen: VAS-Verlag pp: 264-289. 2008.

Practical Ecofeminism in Blaze: Discourse on Art, Women and Feminism edited by Karen Frostig and Kathy A. Halamka, Newcastle: Cambridge Scholars Publishing, p. 315. 2007.

== Articles in Journals and Magazines ==
The Music of the Trees: The Blued Trees Symphony and Opera as Environmental Research and Legal Activism Leonardo Music Journal 2019 Vol. 29, 8-13. 2019. https://www.mitpressjournals.org/doi/pdfplus/10.1162/lmj_a_01055

Blowin’ in the Wind” M/E/A/N/I/N/G: The Final Issue on A Year of Positive Thinking December 2016. https://ayearofpositivethinking.com/2016/12/17/

The Spirit of Change: Water, Policy and Ecological Artmaking Center for Humans and Nature October 21, 2016 https://www.humansandnature.org/the-spirit-of-change

Blued Trees on the front lines journal excerpts The Brooklyn Rail, November 5, 2015.

https://brooklynrail.org/2015/11/criticspage/blued-trees-on-the-front-lines-journal-excerpts

Blued Trees CSPA Quarterly Issue 12, August 3, 2015.

https://www.jstor.org/stable/cspaquarterly.issue-12 2015.

A Community of Resistance: Collaborative Work with Science and Scientists.” WEAD Magazine (an online magazine). Issue 7, CREATING COMMUNITY, 2014.

https://directory.weadartists.org/communities-art-science

Fish Story Memphis: Memphis is the Centre of the World Journal for Environmental Studies and Sciences [online] Vol. 4 (2; June 2014): 176–179.

http://link.springer.com/article/10.1007%2Fs13412-013-0150-z

Triggering Change: A Call to Action Public Art Review Vol. 24, Issue 48, Spring/Summer 2013.

https://issuu.com/forecastpublicart/docs/par48_full

Mapping Trigger Point Theory as Aesthetic Activism PJIM, Vol.4, Issue 2, Winter pp. 1–9. 2012.

== Publications ==
- Ecoart in Action: Activities, Case Studies, and Provocations for Classrooms and Communities, New Village Press, February 2022.
- Divining Chaos: The Autobiography of an Idea, New Village Press, June 2022.

== See also ==
- Ecovention
- Sue Spaid
