= Maja and Reuben Fowkes =

Maja and Reuben Fowkes are curators, critics and art historians who investigate engagements in contemporary art with ecology, climate change and the Anthropocene. Their work also addresses the art history of the territories of the former socialist world from Eastern Europe to Central Asia. They are university lecturers at the School of History and Art History, University of East Anglia, and are based in the Sainsbury Museum and Art Centre.

Their book on Art and Climate Change was published in the Thames & Hudson World of Art series in 2022 has been translated into Italian and Traditional Chinese, and is regarded as the most 'comprehensive, sharp and enlightening,' of the many books on art and environmental emergency.

They are authors of Central and Eastern European Art Since 1950 (World of Art), published by Thames & Hudson in 2020, the "first ever comprehensive, transnational survey of the major movements and practitioners of recent art from Central and Eastern Europe."

Their research on the Socialist Anthropocene in the Visual Arts (SAVA) investigates the environmental histories and art histories of the socialist world during the Anthropocene.

From 2018-2025 they ran the Post-socialist Art Centre (PACT) at the Institute of Advanced Studies, University College London.

They are the founders of the Translocal Institute for Contemporary Art, a centre for transnational research into East European art and ecology that operates across the disciplinary boundaries of art history, contemporary art and ecological thought.

== Art and ecology ==
They are the authors of Art and Climate Change, that "presents an overview of ecologically conscious contemporary art that addresses the climate emergency, as artists across the world call for an active, collective engagement with the planet, and illuminate some of the structures that threaten humanity’s survival."

At UCL Institute of Advanced Studies they run a major ERC/UKRI funded research programme (2022-27) on the Socialist Anthropocene in the Visual Arts that includes intensive research weeks with guest speakers around the topics such as extractivism, infrastructures and the countryside under socialism.

They edited the book Ilona Németh: Eastern Sugar (Sternberg Press, 2022), which explored the parallels between the social and environmental histories of East European sugar beet and Caribbean sugar cane during the Anthropocene "opening up planetary trajectories for postcapitalist alternatives."

They wrote on "The Politics and Ecology of Invasive Species: A Changing Climate for Pioneering Plants" in the Routledge Companion to Contemporary Art, Visual Culture, and Climate Change (2021).

They are curators of the Experimental Reading Room which has been held in venues in Budapest, Vienna, Glasgow, Miami and London.

Their Danube River School brought together artists, writers, environmental historians and anthropologists for a series of symposiums, exhibitions and excursions into wilderness and resulted in the publication River Ecologies: Contemporary Art and Environmental Humanities on the Danube (2015).

Interviews about their recent publications and work on the issue of art in the Anthropocene appeared in the online journal Arterritory in 2023 and in the book Along Ecological Lines: Contemporary Art and Climate Crisis in 1919.

Their Danube River School project between 2013 and 2015 brought together artists, writers, environmental historians and anthropologists for a series of symposiums, exhibitions and excursions into wilderness and resulted in the publication River Ecologies: Contemporary Art and Environmental Humanities on the Danube (2015),

== East European art ==
A major focus of their work is on researching East European art since 1945 and contemporary East European art.

They are co-authors of the Thames & Hudson World of Art series book on Central and Eastern European Art Since 1950, the first of its kind to survey the art of the region from the Second World War till today.

Maja Fowkes is the author of The Green Bloc: Neo-avant-garde Art and Ecology under Socialism (2015).

They co-directed the Getty Foundation Connecting Art Histories funded international programme Confrontations: Sessions in East European Art History based at the Post-socialist Art Centre (PACT, UCL) from 2018-22.

Their publications on East European art include two special issues of Third Text, the first on 'Socialist Eastern Europe' (2009), the second on ‘Actually Existing Artworlds under Socialism’ (2018).

Their performative lecture Points East: An Artworld, a City and a Continent in Transformation, held at the Centre for Contemporary Art (CCA) Glasgow in November 2019 restaged a seminal meeting of critics, artists and art historians at Glasgow’s Third Eye Centre in December 1990.

Their article 'Placing Bookmarks: The Institutionalisation and De-Institutionalisation of Hungarian Neo-Avant-Garde and Contemporary Art' on the role of collectors, global museums and art historians in forming art historical narratives appeared in Tate Papers in 2016.

== Exhibitions ==
They are the curators of the exhibition Potential Agrarianisms at Kunsthalle Bratislava in 2021, which set out to "diversify agriculture and pluralise its histories, recovering suppressed peasant pasts and activating their unrealised possibilities, destabilising urban-rural dichotomies, repairing the disconnect with the natural world and restoring caring and reciprocal relationships to the soils and plants that nourish us."

With the field of art and science, they curated the exhibition Colliding Epistemes: Art, Science, Anthropocenes, which was held at venues in Poland, Brussels and Romania in 2022, and invited artists and visitors to consider what happens when the "epistemes of art and science collide, disciplinary boundaries dissolve, the hierarchies of Western thought are radically subverted, and hybrid forms of untamed knowledge of the world emerge."

Their curated exhibitions include Revolution is not a Garden Party, which dealt with the legacy of the 1956 Revolution for contemporary art and was held at Trafo Gallery Budapest, Norwich Gallery and Galerija Miroslav Kraljevic in Zagreb in 2006-7. The second part of their revolution trilogy is Revolution I Love You: 1968 in Art, Politics and Philosophy which was shown at the Centre for Contemporary Art Thessaloniki in summer 2008, as well as Trafo Gallery Budapest and International Project Space Birmingham. Revolutionary Decadence: Foreign Artists in Budapest since 1989 completed the trilogy and was shown at Kiscell Museum Budapest in November 2009.

In 2010 and 2011 they curated the exhibition Loophole to Happiness that explored the freedom-enhancing loopholes that exist on the margins of social systems from East European communism to global capitalism, taking the inventive strategies of worker resistance under socialism as the starting point for contemporary attempts to imagine exceptions and find escape routes from today’s neo-liberal capitalist order. Held at Trafo Gallery Budapest, Museum Sztuki Lodz, Futura Centre for Contemporary Art Prague and AMT Project Bratislava, the exhibition also resulted in a samizdat publication.

Their exhibition Like a Bird: Avian Ecologies in Contemporary Art examined complex questions around the changing human relationship to the natural world, the channelling of environmental awareness and its political dimensions and was shown at Trafo Gallery Budapest and tranzit.ro in Bucharest in 2014.

== See also ==
- Sustainable art
- Ecological art
- Contemporary art
- Art history
- Ecological humanities
