= Quante =

Quante is a surname. Notable people with the surname include:

- Heidi Quante, American artist
- Otto Quante (1875–1947), German painter
