= Jan Jagodzinski =

Canadian academic

Jan Jagodzinski (born 1948) is a Canadian scholar and Professor Emeritus of Visual Arts and Media Education at the University of Alberta in Edmonton, Canada. He spells his name in lowercase.

== Education and academic career ==
In 1977, Jagodzinski became a Master of Education (M.Ed.) at the University of Alberta in Edmonton. He continued his studies there and received his doctorate in 1980.

From 1980 to 1982, Jagodzinski held a joint appointment as Assistant Professor of Art and Curriculum at Mount St. Vincent University and the Nova Scotia College of Art and Design in Halifax, Canada. In 1982, he joined the University of Alberta as an art instructor, became an assistant professor in 1983 and served as a professor of visual art and media education until 2022. Jagodzinski is retired from the University of Alberta, but continues to publish his work. Jagodzinski has also held visiting- and guest professorships at the University of California, Los Angeles and the University of Klagenfurt Austria.

== Scholarly work ==
In his books, the numerous book chapters and journal articles, Jagodzinski approaches art, art education, and curriculum issues through the lens of psychoanalytic and philosophical theory.

His first book, The Anamorphic I/i : Finding My Own Step Through The (My)Nfield of Pheminism and Art (1996), written over the course of ten years, “is a labyrinth of passages … created by a personal search which began by asking what relationships might be possible for a straight male to various forms of feminism, queer theories, and gay and lesbian issues of representation as they are played out in … visual&art education, film, and cultural studies.”

In Postmodern Dilemmas: Outrageous Essays in Art&Art Education (1997) and Pun(k) Deconstruction: Experifigural Writings in Art&Art Education (1997), Jagodzinski addresses issues of postmodernity and poststructuralism in his attempt to deconstruct the current paradigm of art education.

In the trilogy on everyday media practices and youth culture, Youth Fantasies: The Perverse Landscape of Media (2004), Musical Fantasies: A Lacanian Approach (2005), and Youth and Television Culture: Televised Paranoia (2008), Jagodzinski uses a psychoanalytic framework to explore the meaning of “youth” and what “youth” wants in postmodern industrialized countries.

Questions about current challenges to education, art, and art education, and where their future may be headed, are addressed in Art and Education in an Era of Designer Capitalism: Deconstructing the Oral Eye (2010), and in the edited volumes Arts Based Research. A Critique and a Proposal (2013, co-edited with Jason Wallin), The Precarious Future of Education (2017), and What is Art Education? After Deleuze and Guattari (2017).

In his more recent writings, Jagodzinski addresses the precarious conditions for our species living on the Earth in terms of both ecological and political crises: Interrogating the Anthropocene: Ecology, Aesthetics, Pedagogy, and the Future in Question (2018), Schizoanalytic Ventures at the End of the World: Film, Video, Art, and Pedagogical Challenges (2019), Pedagogical Explorations in a Posthuman Age: Essays on Designer Capitalism, Eco-Aestheticism, and Visual and Popular Culture as West-East Meet (2020), Ahuman Pedagogy: Multidisciplinary Perspectives for Education in the Anthropocene (2022, co-edited with Jessie Beier), Pedagogy in the Anthropocene: Re-Wilding Education for a New Earth (2022, co-edited with Michael Paulsen & Hawke Shé), Pedagogical Encounters in the Post-Anthropocene, Volume 1: Childhood, Environment, Indigeneity (2024), and Pedagogical Encounters in the Post-Anthropocene, Volume 2: Technology, Neurology, Quantum (2024).

Jagodzinski is the series editor for Palgrave Studies in Educational Future which aims to address “the precarity that reverberates throughout all life, and attempts to explore and experiment to develop an educational imagination which, at the very least, makes conscious what is a dire situation.”

Jagodzinski’s contributions to research and teaching have been recognized by the University of Alberta with the McCalla Research Award (2003), the Beauchamp Research Award (2008) and a Killam Professorship (2011). External recognition includes the Exemplary Leadership and Outstanding Contribution Award by the National Art Education Association (USA, 1993), the C.D. Gaitskell Memorial Lecture Award by the Canadian Society for the Education Through Art (2006), the Studies in Art Education Award by the National Art Education Association (USA, 2007), the Manuel Barkan Memorial Award (2011), the Canadian Art Educator of the Year (2013), the Ted T. Aoki Award for Distinguished Service from the Canadian Association for Curriculum Studies (2020) and the 2022 International Ziegfeld Award from the United States Society for Education through Art (USSEA).

== Reception ==
In the context of art education, Jagodzinski’s "rigorous and astute insights and conceptualisations in Youth Fantasies" are considered by Vicki Daiello et al. to be most helpful in understanding Lacanian psychoanalytic theory and subjectivity. According to Mark Carrigan reviewing Television and Youth Culture, the greatest strengths of Jagodzinski’s psychoanalytic approach from a sociological standpoint are also its greatest weaknesses: Psychoanalytic arguments are sporadically linked to sociological insights but the connections introduced are never systematically developed".

In his review article of Lacan in Art Education, Joâo Pedro Fróis (2010) focuses on the use of Lacan’s work by Jagodzinski and Dennis Atkinson, stressing that "(t)heir contributions illustrate the vitality of psychoanalysis for understanding the development of the subject in the aesthetic, cognitive, and social dimensions".

The prosthetic video game theory developed by jagodzinski in Schizoanalytic Ventures At the End of the World (2019) is used in an ethnographic study of game avatars by Luthfie Arguby Prnomo et al.

Referring to Jagodzinski's film analyses, Jûrate Baranova (2020, 111) notes that "jagodzinski’s examples of video projects and fiction films offer an understanding of the world as infinite; more than one usually sees and hears".

Referring to Jagodzinski's book What is Art Education? After Deleuze and Guattari (2017), Manuel Zahn (2021, 189) points out that Jagodzinski uses Deleuze and Guattari’s conceptual difference between percepts and perceptions as well as affects and affections to make the argument that artworks/visual culture can possibly "entangle their viewers in percepts and affects that enables new perceptions for them".

The book Arts-Based Research: A Critique and a Proposal (2013), co-authored by Jagodzinski and Jason Wallin, is for Carl Leggo (2014) "a singular book that all arts-based researchers ought to attend to. jagodzinski and Wallin offer a gift that is sure to provoke and evoke a cacophony of responses. This book presents many challenges, but the challenges are exactly what arts-based researchers need in order to engage in the kind of creative and scholarly research that can transform how we understand and practice arts education in schools and communities".

Regarding the challenges for education, "jan jagodzinski frames the educational task away from the emancipation model, and instead suggests one that is framed by the Anthropocene [...]"

== Personal life ==
Jagodzinski has a passion for triathlon and has competed as part of the Canadian team at the World Triathlon Age Group Championships in Pontevedra, Spain (2023) and Torremolinos, Spain (2024), as well as in the Aquabike in Fyn, Denmark (2018). He has competed in numerous Ironmen and Ironmen 70.3 events. In 2004, Jagodzinski qualified to compete in the Ironman World Championship in Kona, Hawaii.

== Selected publications ==
- jagodzinski, jan (1996). The Anamorphic I/i. Edmonton, Alberta: Duval House Publishing Inc.
- jagodzinski, jan (1997). Postmodern Dilemmas: Outrageous Essays in Art&Art Education. New Jersey: Lawrence Erlbaum.
- jagodzinski, jan (1997). Pun(k) Deconstruction: Experifigural Writings in Art&Art Education. New Jersey: Lawrence Erlbaum.
- jagodzinski, jan, ed. (2002). Pedagogical Desire: Transference, Seduction and the Question of Ethics. Westport, Connecticut: Bergin & Garvey.
- jagodzinski, jan (2004). Youth Fantasies: The Perverse Landscape of the Media. New York: Palgrave Press.
- jagodzinski, jan (2005). Musical Fantasies: A Lacanian Approach. New York: Palgrave Press.
- jagodzinski, jan (2008). Youth and Television Culture: Televised Paranoia. New York: Palgrave Macmillan Press.
- jagodzinski, jan (2010). Art and Education in an Era of Designer Capitalism: Deconstructing the Oral Eye. New York and London: Palgrave Macmillan.
- jagodzinski, jan (2011). Misreading Postmodern Antigone: Marco Bellocio Devil in the Flesh (Diavolo in Corpro). Intellect Books.
- jagodzinski, jan, ed. (2012). Psychoanalyzing Cinema: A Productive Encounter of Lacan, Deleuze, and Zizek. New York and London: Palgrave Macmillan.
- jagodzinski, jan; Wallin, Jason (2013). Arts Based Research: A Critique and a Proposal. Rotterdam, Boston, Taipei: Sense Publishers. ISBN 978-9462091856.
- jagodzinski, jan, ed. (2017). The Precarious Future of Education. New York and London: Palgrave Macmillan. ISBN 978-1137486912.
- jagodzinski, jan, ed. (2017). What is Art Education? After Deleuze and Guattari. New York and London: Palgrave Macmillan. ISBN 9781137481269.

=== Palgrave Studies in Educational Futures (book series) ===
- jagodzinski, jan, ed. (2018). Interrogating the Anthropocene: Ecology, Aesthetics, Pedagogy, and the Future in Question. Palgrave Macmillan. ISBN 978-3319787473.
- jagodzinski, jan (2019). Schizoanalytic Ventures at the End of the World: Film, Video, Art, and Pedagogical Challenges. Springer. ISBN 978-3030123666.
- jagodzinski, jan (2020). Pedagogical Explorations in a Posthuman Age: Essays on Designer Capitalism, Eco-Aestheticism, and Visual and Popular Culture as West-East Meet. Springer. ISBN 9783030486174.
- Paulsen, Michael; jagodzinski, jan; Hawke, Shé M., eds. (2022). Pedagogy in the Anthropocene:Re-Wilding Education for a New Earth. Springer. ISBN 9783030947194.
- Beier, Jessie L.; jagodzinski, jan, eds. (2022). Ahuman Pedagogy: Multidisciplinary Perspectives for Education in the Anthropocene. Springer. ISBN 9783030909796.
- jagodzinski, jan (2024). Pedagogical Encounters in the Post-Anthropocene, Volume 1: Childhood, Environment, Indigeneity. ISBN 9783031548482.
- jagodzinski, jan (2024). Pedagogical Encounters in the Post-Anthropocene, Volume 2: Technology, Neurology, Quantum. Springer. ISBN 9783031547829.
