= Don Krug =

American activist and academic (1957–2017)

Don Herbert Krug
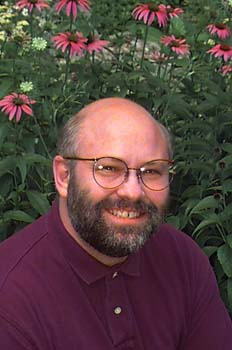
- Born: 23 January 1957; Wisconsin, United States
- Died: 2 April 2017 (aged 60)
- Known for: Education, Technology Studies, Art Education, Ecological Studies. Academic Scholarship
- Scientific career
- Fields: Education
- Workplaces: University of British Columbia

Don Krug (23 January 1957 – 2 April 2017) was an educator, activist, and author.

== Background ==
Born in Sheboygan, Wisconsin, and taught in the public schools in Wisconsin for 10 years. From 1994 to 2001, he served as the senior editor of the Journal of Cultural Research in Art Education, a publication of USSEA a national affiliate of International Society for Education through Art (INSEA). He served on the editorial board of Studies in Art Education and Art Education, publications of the National Art Education Association. He publishes widely about connections of aesthetics, cultures, ecology, education, pedagogy, and human computer interactions. In 2005, GreenMuseum.Org acquired the Art & Ecology: Interdisciplinary Approaches to Curriculum website he developed in 1997, for The Getty Education Institute for the Arts. In 1999–2000, he developed "Ethnic Arts: A Means of Intercultural Communication-Online" a distance education course to study how students mediate virtual environments while learning and communicating about ideas and issues of diversity and difference among their peers. In 2001–2002, he authored a teacher professional development online book/course Identity and Place in Contemporary Art. This distance education book/course was a collaboration between Davis Publication, Art:21, PBS public television, and Marlboro College, Art: 21 produced "Contemporary Artists in the Twenty-first Century", a four-part videotape series examining the work of twenty-one contemporary artists.

Krug is currently on the education faculty of the University of British Columbia in the Department of Curriculum & Pedagogy. He is a faculty associate with the Institute for Computing, Information & Cognitive Systems (ICICS), Media and Graphics Interdisciplinary Centre and Centre for Digital Media at UBC. From 1993 to 2002, he taught at Ohio State University and held associate faculty appointments with the Advance Computing Center for Art and Design and the Center for Folklife Studies. He was a Fulbright Award recipient in 2000–2001.

He is the Director of the integrating Technologies through Education and Cultures LAB and as of 2009 he is researching the administrative, assessment, communicative, curricular, pedagogical, and research dimensions associated with the use and integration of Information and Communication Technologies (ICT) (e.g., new media, learning technologies, digital literacies, digital culture, etc.). His research examines the changing dynamics and contextual conditions that influence how administrators, teachers, and students accept, oppose, and/or resist the use of educational technologies in face-to-face, hybrid, and online distance education learning environments. Current, research projects with UBC graduate students and through provincial partnerships include: "BC Portfolio Requirements: ICT and the Power of the Arts", "The Seeds of Possibility: Integrating ICT into the Teacher Education Two-year Elementary Program", and "Investigating Pedagogy and Rich Media Development in Face-to-Face, Hybrid, and Online Distance Education Learning Environments".
