= Ecovention =

Ecovention was a term invented by Amy Lipton and Sue Spaid in 1999 to refer to an ecological art intervention in environmental degradation. The Ecovention movement in art is associated with land art, earthworks, and environmental art, and landscape architecture, but remains its own distinct category. Many ecoventions bear tendencies similar to public works projects such as sewage and waste-water treatment plants, public gardens, landfills, mines, and sustainable building projects.

The term 'Ecovention' appears by the composition of the terms 'ecology' and 'innovation' or 'intervention'. The intention was to concrete a kind of art that alludes to the interventions that artists were made in degraded natural territories, pretending to generate a public consciousness, showing the existence of solutions. The fact of restoring make the artists enter in a collaboration process with the nature in a social way. They help to generate a new paradigm teaching how art could help the society not only in a social or political criticism, but getting directly involved in the world. They are responsible for extending the various environmental principles and practices to the community.

Artists will focus on various aspects like: biological, cultural, political or historical. At the same time, different professionals work that are fundamental; architects, botanists, zoologists, engineers, ecologists... all based on the imaginative idea of an artist 4. Activism, the re-evaluation of territories, the study of diversity and the recovery of spaces will be some of its main characteristics. To carry them out, they use new techniques in order to transform that local ecology in order to reestablish natural resources and stabilize environments. His works have as a common goal to motivate the viewer to visit these spaces generating awareness and in turn encourage more interventions.

Artists associated with ecovention include: Joseph Beuys, Mel Chin, Agnes Denes, Helen and Newton Harrison, Ocean Earth, Robert Smithson, Alan Sonfist, and Mierle Laderman Ukeles, among others.

== Exhibitions ==
Ecovention is also the title of a 2002 exhibition at the Cincinnati Contemporary Arts Center in Ohio, and the title of exhibition catalog, joint published with the Greenmuseum. It was considered the definitive text on ecological art for several years and the only text available for teaching the topic at the college and University level.

Other major exhibitions apart from the CAC's "Ecovention" exhibition include: "Earth Art" (1969) at Cornell University, "Elements of Art: Earth, Air and Fire" (1971) at Boston's Museum of Fine Arts, "Earthworks: Land Reclamation as Sculpture" (1979) at the Seattle Art Museum, and "Fragile Ecologies" (1992) curated by Barbara Matilsky at the Queens Museum of Art.

There is a new exhibition, Ecovention Europe, planned to open in the Fall of 2017. The show is also curated by Sue Spaid, and will feature a new text furthering the conversation around what an "Ecovention" is. The show will be held at the Museum De Domijnen in Sittard, Netherlands.
