= Eve Mosher =

American environmental artist

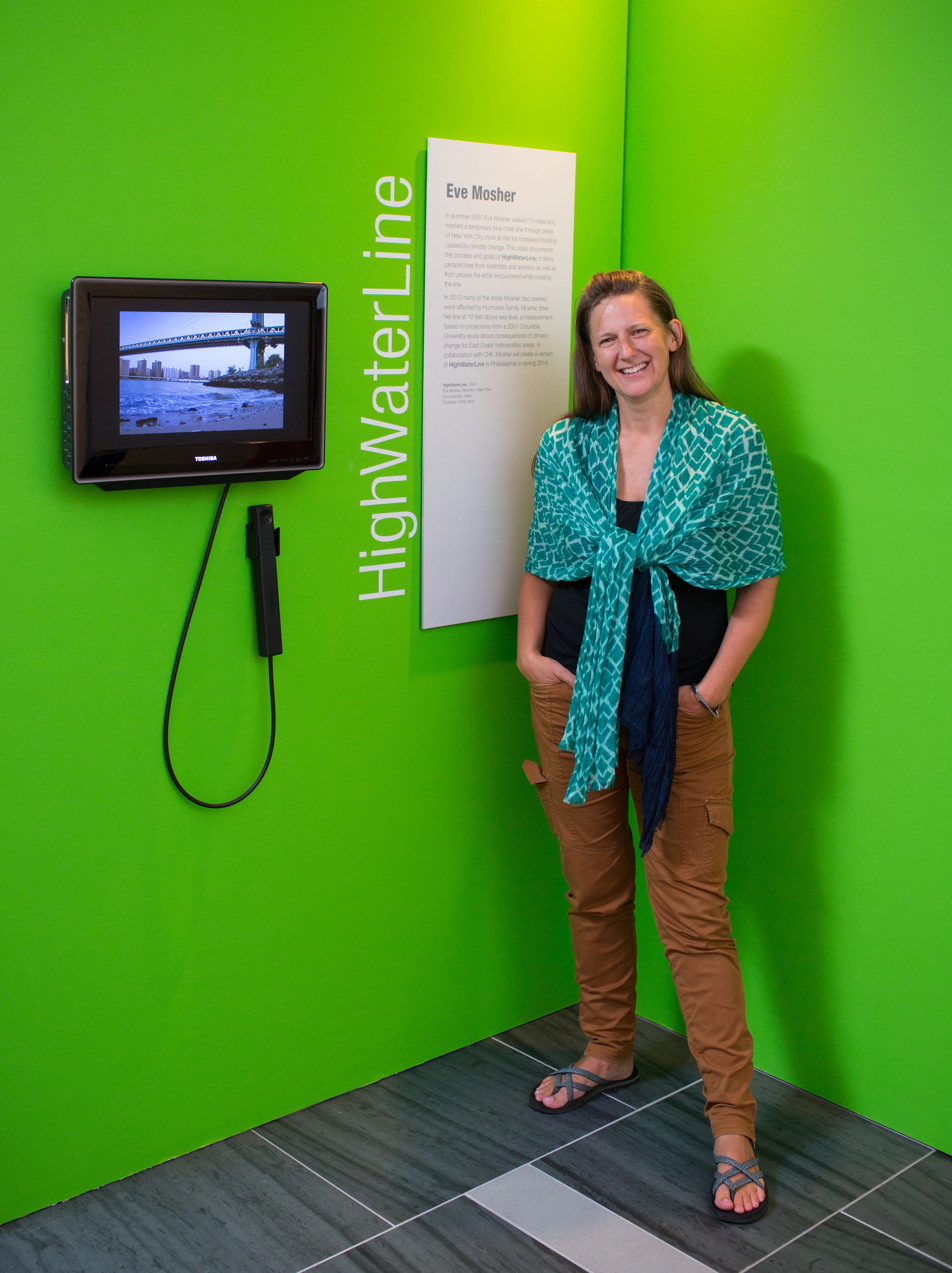
- Sensing Change exhibit, 2013
- Born: New York, NY, U.S.A.
- Notable work: HighWaterLine
- Movement: Environmental art
- Website: www.evemosher.com

Eve Mosher is an American environmental artist living and working in Northeast Scotland. She is best known for her public art installation HighWaterLine, which premiered in New York City in 2007. Her predictions about where waters would rise due to climate change were validated by flood levels during Hurricane Sandy in 2012. Other locations for installations of HighWaterLine include Miami, Florida, where it was created with the help of volunteers (2013) Bristol, England and Philadelphia, Pennsylvania (2014).

She is co-founder of Works on Water, an artist-run organisation which supports artists working on, in and with the water. She is also co-founder of play:groundNYC an organisation dedicated to transforming the city of New York through play.

More recent works include a role as the River Animateur for Findhorn Watershed Initiative in partnership with Findhorn Bay Arts, and currently Eve is the embedded artist of Sea Change - Montrose, a project initiated by Culture for Climate Scotland that seeks to co-create coastal futures with the communities impacted by climate change.

== Early works ==
Eve Mosher initially worked as a studio artist, creating abstract interpretations of the natural and built environments through drawings, sculptures, and installations. Then, in 2006, she felt a need to do something in response to climate change and began to brainstorm ideas.

She was an Exhibiting Artist at Eyebeam in 2008 and 2009.

== HighWaterLine ==
External videos
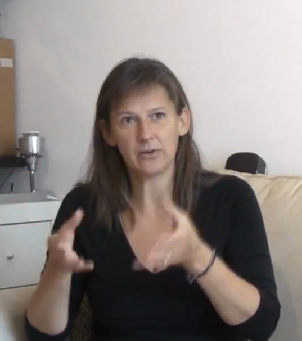
- "It was a very striking turning point for me, with my artistic practice... this public, climate-change based project.", Science History Institute, 2016

=== New York City, New York ===
In 2007 artist Eve S. Mosher created a public art project in Brooklyn and Manhattan that brought the topic of climate change literally to the doorsteps of the city's residents. Scientists had predicted that water levels in New York, in the event of a "hundred year flood", could rise ten feet above sea level. But with sea levels rising along the East Coast — a natural phenomenon accelerated by climate change — they now projected that what was once considered a 100-year flood could soon happen as often as every 3 to 20 years.

Eve Mosher used topographic maps, satellite images, and data from NASA's Goddard Institute for Space Studies at Columbia University, to predict the locations likely to be subject to flooding. Then Mosher walked 70 miles of New York coastline, pushing a "Heavy Hitter" (a baseball field line machine) to draw a 4" blue chalk line on the ground, marking the predicted water levels. In areas where she was unable to draw a line, she marked the high water boundary with illuminated beacons. The project was completed over a period of six months. Mosher's HighWaterLine went past low-income housing developments, luxury apartment buildings, power stations, nursing homes, and hospitals. One observer wrote later, "it was beyond moving to see an artist simplify complex data that typically might seem too abstract to relate to."

Along the way, people came up to her to ask what she was doing, and Mosher talked with them. A significant goal of the project was to engage local people and hear their stories. Heidi Quante, a creative coordinator with the climate action group 350.org, reported that "Eve really found a new way of teaching people... Her art was so good, she became a magnet. And when people learn by asking rather than being told, they retain the information better."

Two years later, when Hurricane Irene approached, areas below Mosher's HighWaterLine were evacuated. Luckily Irene veered away from the city. Four years later, Mosher's predictions were strikingly validated when the storm surge from Hurricane Sandy flooded many of the areas she had traversed. American Scientist reports that "High Water Line is an invitation to understand, to act, and to prepare. But if political solutions to climate change don't materialize soon, it may also be an invitation to come to terms with loss."

=== Miami, Florida ===
In Miami, HighWaterLine was collaboratively installed after considerable advance planning and work by Eve Mosher, Heidi Quante and volunteers from the community-led Resilient Miami action group. More than 70 different residents marked the line in their own neighborhoods, each passing the field marker to the next person. The result was a 26-mile-long continuous line, created over three days, November 13, 14, and 17, 2013. Mosher intentionally expanded her engagement with the community before and after the project, but the goal of interacting with people continued to be creating conversations and awareness.

"I really believe that using creativity in taking on the complex challenges of climate change is a way to allow everyone to participate. Putting those tools in the hands of individual community members allows them to go into their own neighborhood and bring their neighbors into the conversation in ways that no one outside of the community can do."

She has also worked with Patricia Watts and Amy Lipton to develop a "HighWaterLine ACTION GUIDE", to help people locally engage with their communities and develop their own installations of HighWaterLine.

=== Philadelphia, Pennsylvania ===
External videos
- Vividly illustrating climate change, artist draws a high water line in Philly neighborhoods, Newsworks, 7 May 2014

An installation of HighWaterLine occurred in Philadelphia, Pennsylvania, in May 2014. Mosher worked with local Philadelphia residents to draw a thick chalk line through four miles of sidewalks and streets in the Kensington, Fishtown and Port Richmond neighborhoods. Philadelphia's ten-foot zone includes numerous industrial and factory sites: flooding would impact a number of Superfund sites, polluted locations requiring a long-term response to clean up hazardous material contaminations.
