= Andrea Polli =

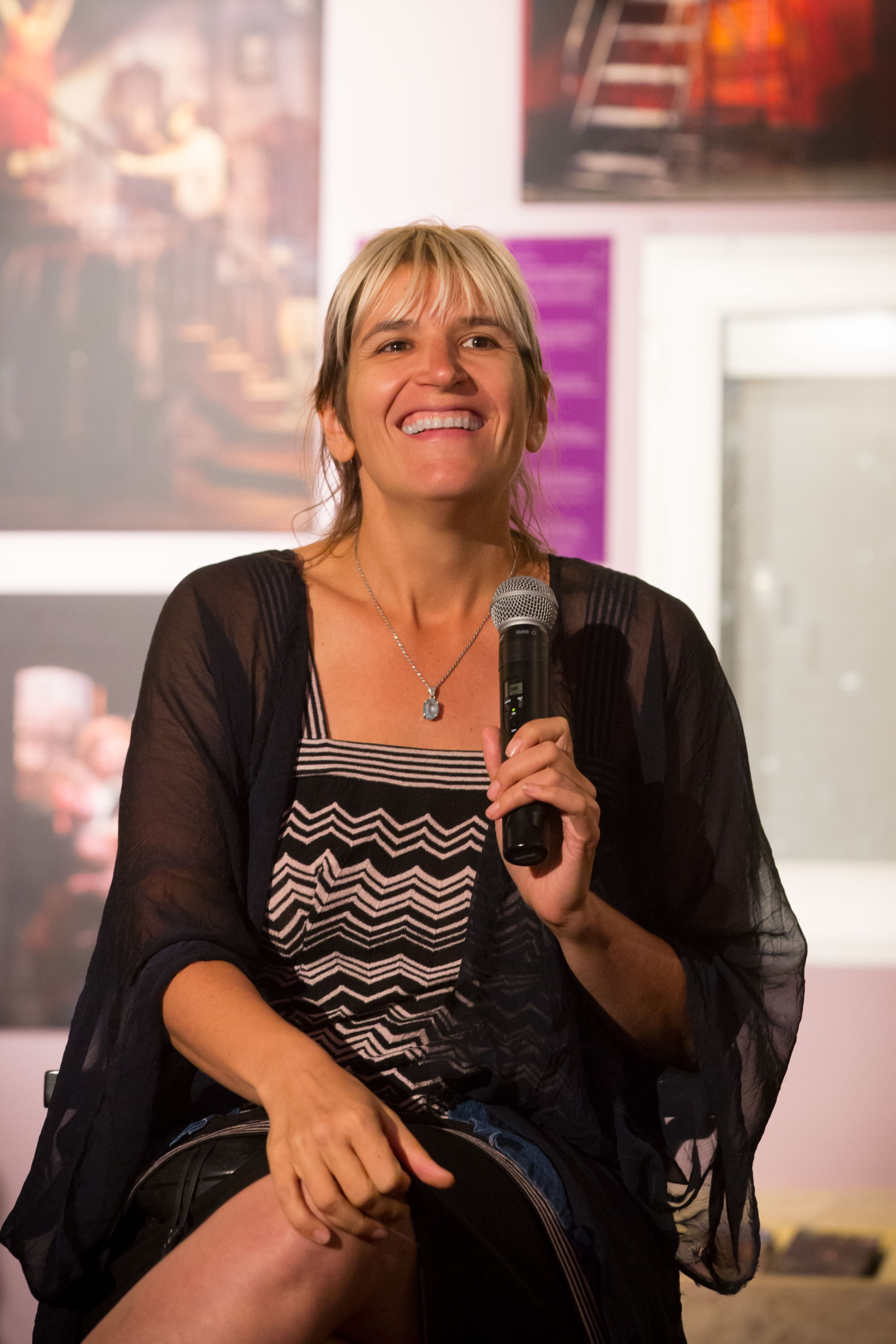
- Opening of Particle Falls, 2013
- Born: 1968 (age 57–58)
- Education: Master of Fine Arts, Art Institute of Chicago; PhD in computing, University of Plymouth, UK.
- Notable work: Atmospherics/Weather Works, Heat and the Heartbeat of the City, N. Particle Falls
- Movement: Environmental art
- Awards: Fulbright (2011), UNESCO Digital Arts Award (2003)
- Website: http://www.andreapolli.com/

Andrea Polli (born 1968) is an environmental artist and writer. Polli blends art and science to create widely varied media and technology artworks related to environmental issues. Her works are presented in various forms, she uses interactive websites, digital broadcasting, mobile applications, and performances, which allows her to reach a wider audience. Additionally, Polli's installations, such as Particle Falls, have been displayed in multiple cities across the U.S., including Philadelphia, Detroit, and Pittsburgh, where they use real-time data to visualize environmental conditions like air quality, raising awareness about pollution and climate change.[5] Polli uses feels that creativity can be a response to current issues such as the rise of Artificial Intelligence and global warming.

Her work has appeared widely in over one hundred exhibitions and performances both nationally and internationally including the Whitney Museum of American Art Artport and the Field Museum of Natural History. Her creative process includes the collaboration of other individuals and extensive fieldwork on site with scientific researchers. She has received numerous grants, residencies, including a residency at Eyebeam, and awards including the Fulbright Specialist Program (2011) and the UNESCO Digital Arts Award (2003). She is currently an Associate Professor of Art and Ecology at the University of New Mexico.

"Philadelphia has come a long way in improving the quality of the air we breathe." Philadelphia Air Management Services, 2017.

"Her collaborations include work with atmospheric scientists to create immersive visualizations of climate data, as well as community-centered initiatives that connect environmental research with cultural resilience."

"University of New Mexico Faculty Profile." University of New Mexico, 2020.

== Education ==
Polli has a Bachelors of Art in the History of Art from Johns Hopkins University. Polli went on to get a Masters of Fine Arts in time arts from the School of the Art Institute of Chicago. She has a PhD in computing, communications and electronics from the University of Plymouth, UK.

As an educator, Polli has developed new media programs at Robert Morris College and Columbia College in Chicago. She was voted 2000/2001 Teacher of the Year at Columbia in recognition of her work connecting students to the wider community through collaborative projects. From 2005 to 2008 she served as the director of the Integrated Media Arts Masters of Fine Arts Program at Hunter College in New York City. Additionally, Polli became an associate professor of Art and Ecology with appointments in the College of Fine Arts and School of Engineering at the University of New Mexico, there she directs the Social Media Workgroup, a lab at the University's Center for Advanced Research Computing which focuses on exploring the intersection of social media and digital technology for environmental engagement. The Social Media Workgroup has received an NSF grant for a project focusing on energy harvesting. Polli currently holds the Mesa Del Sol Endowed Chair in Digital Media at the University of New Mexico, where she directs STEAM initiatives that combine science, technology, engineering, art, and math. Her joint appointment in the College of Fine Arts and the School of Engineering reflects a rare institutional model for cross-disciplinary environmental research and pedagogy.

"University of New Mexico Faculty Profile." University of New Mexico, 2020.

== Work ==
=== Sonification ===
Polli works with atmospheric scientists to develop systems for understanding storm and climate through sound. She began collaborating on sound and data sonification projects in 1999, and partnering with organizations such as NASA’s Goddard Institute Climate Research Group and the National Center for Atmospheric Research. In one of her key installations Atmospherics/Weather Works Polli used detailed climate models to recreate the sounds of two major East Coast storms: the presidents’ Day Snowstorm of 1979 and Hurricane Bob in 1991. Additionally, Polli’s artistic exploration took her to Antarctica where she spent seven weeks working on National Science Foundation funded project, there, she collaborated with artist Tia Kramer, who was working as a communications operator at McMurdo Station, and other scientists. The sounds she recorded there included water pouring off a glacier and wind whipping through the valleys. One of her other prominent works, Heat and the Heartbeat of the City involved creating sonifications based on the actual and projected climate data for Central Park. Another project, N. (pronounced n-point), developed in collaboration with Joe Gilmore, is a real-time multi-channel sonification and visualization of weather patterns in the Arctic.

"Andrea Polli: Art and Science for Climate Change." National Science Foundation, 2007.

=== Light installation ===
External videos
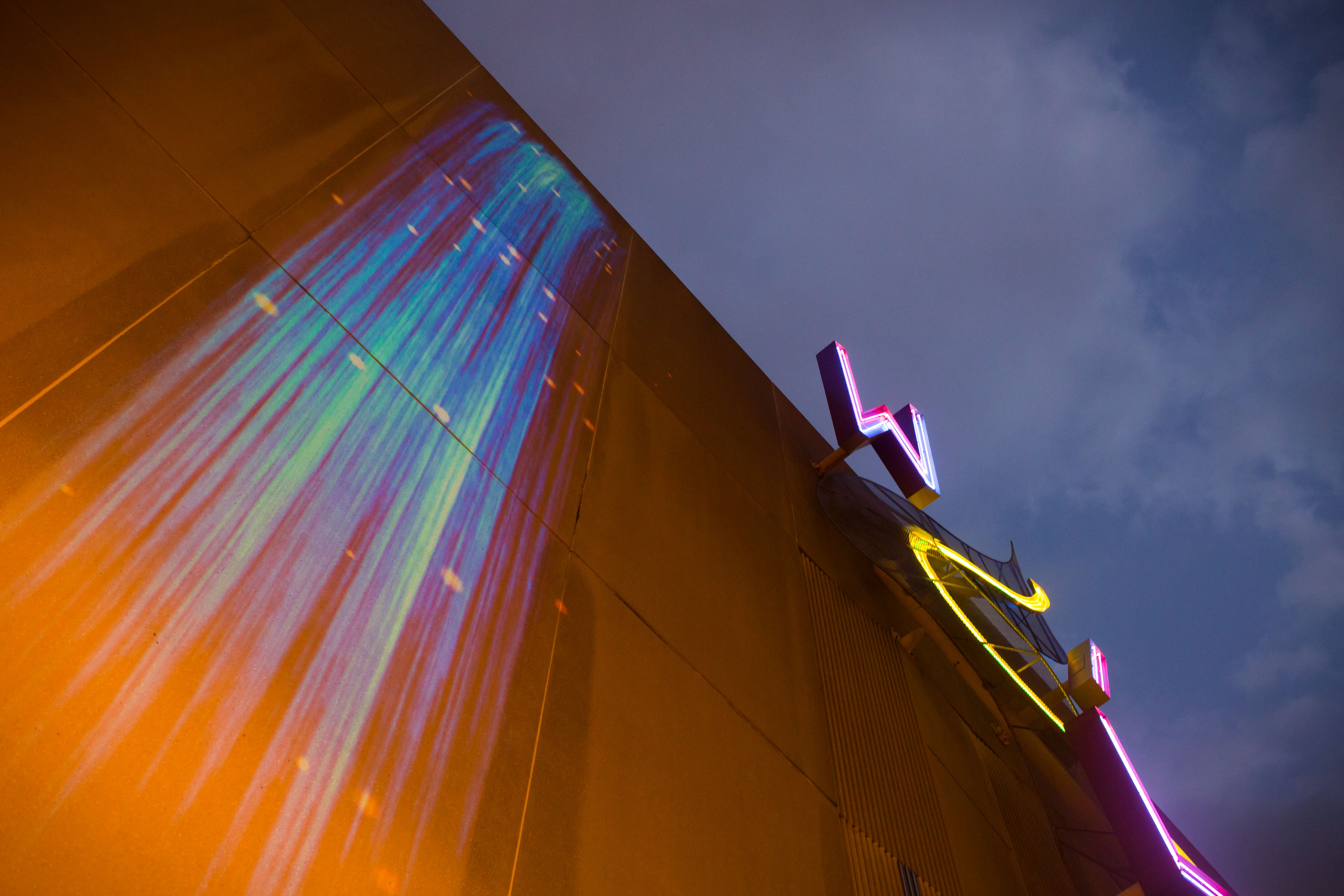
- "I was interested in the materiality of the wind and the air.", Andrea Polli, Science History Institute

Polli has also experimented with the visualization of air through her light installation Particle Falls. This work uses a nephelometer to sample particulate matter in the air from a city street, displaying the data in real-time as changing light patterns every 15 seconds on a building wall.

The installation not only demonstrates the impact of air pollution but also raises awareness about air quality challenges in urban areas. Particle Falls has been displayed in multiple cities across the U.S., including Philadelphia, Detroit, Pittsburgh, and Logan, Utah. It made its debut in 2010 in San Jose, California.

In 2015, Particle Falls was exhibited at the Mona Bismarck American Center in Paris, marking its European debut.

"Philadelphia has come a long way in improving the quality of the air we breathe." Philadelphia Air Management Services, 2017.

=== Experimental architecture ===
Polli proposed Queensbridge Wind Power Project which aimed to incorporate wind turbines into the structure of the Queensbridge in New York city. The project was designed to preserve aspects of the bridge's original architecture while generating energy to power the bridge's lighting and surrounding areas, showcasing a sustainable approach to infrastructure.

In another project, Polli collaborated with Rod Gdovic of WindStax, a Pittsburgh-based wind turbine manufacturer, to create the Energy Flow. This installation features 27,000 multicolored LED lights along the Rachel Carson Bridge in Pittsburgh, PA. The lights visually represent real-time data on wind speed and direction, which is captured by a weather station located on the bridge. The electricity powering Energy Flow is generated by 16 wind turbines attached to the bridge’s catenary arches. Through this installation, Polli aimed to raise awareness of environmental changes through data visualization. "Polli, Andrea. 'Energy Flow: Environmental Art and Technology.' WindStax, 2011.

=== Recent work ===
Polli recently created work for the exhibition Hindsight 5.0, which was held at the University of New Mexico Art Museum. The exhibition itself was inspired by a photography album of the same name. Polli's work explored the creation of organisms through organic shape and varying materials.

Polli lasted project "City Bright" was created to give local artists the opportunity to light up downtown Albuquerque in the fall and winter. By funding the City of Albuquerque's Temporary Public Art Program she gave inspiration to others in the midst of this project.
