= Erika Wanenmacher =

American artist (born 1955)

- Born: 1955 (age 70–71); Berea, Ohio
- Education: 1973-76 Kansas City Art Institute. 1976-77 Feminist Studio Workshop, Los Angeles, CA
- Known for: mixed media, sculpture, installation
- Awards: Kindle Project Award
- Website: https://www.erikawanenmacher.com/

Erika Wanenmacher (born 1955) is a sculptor and installation artist from Santa Fe, New Mexico, a self-described "maker of things." She has said, "I believe objects that are made with intent carry resonance that can shift energy, power, and beliefs. They're about magic and changing consciousness." Wanenmacher's work has been shown nationally and internationally. Her sculptures incorporate many materials and techniques including forged steel and found glass, carved and painted wood, cast aluminum, and large-scale installations. She is represented in Los Angeles, CA by Blythe Projects.

== Artwork ==
The major themes in Wanenmacher's handmade sculptures and installation include the conflicts between nature and culture; U.S. atomic history, and magic and witchcraft. The art critic Michael Abatemarco has written that Wanenmacher's work reveals the medicinal and metaphysical properties of plants and the relationship between the botanical realm and human beings and other animals. Several of her works have addressed the legacy of atomic weapons, including the human radiation experiments during the Cold War. Her installation, "The Science Club, The Boy's Room, Now, Forever, Then, Part 1", examines the relationship between U.S. atomic history and culture, to critique the progress of science, and the adverse effects of the pursuits of nuclear physics. She has used surplus objects from Los Alamos National Laboratory, obtained through Ed Grothus' The Black Hole surplus company.

== Notable exhibits ==
=== Selected solo exhibitions ===
- Boulder Museum of Contemporary Art, Boulder, CO. "The Science Club: The Boy's Room, Now, Forever, Then, Part 1. 2008
- Linda Durham Gallery, Santa Fe, NM. "Where have you been (come to your senses)" 2010. "Ditch Witch" 2009. "I Stole Stealth (Coyote Taught Me) 2007.
- SITE Santa Fe, Santa Fe, NM. "Grimoire" 2001.
- Center for Contemporary Arts, Santa Fe, NM. "Coniunctio: A Twenty-Year Survey". 1996.

=== Selected group exhibitions ===
- Contemporary Museum Saint Louis, Saint Louis, MO. "Cryptic: The Use of Allegory in Contemporary Art with a Master Class from Goya". 2011
- Albright-Knox Museum of Art, Buffalo, NY. "Surveyor" 2011
- New Mexico Museum of Art, Santa Fe, NM. "Case Studies From the Bureau of Contemporary Art" 2011
- Tweed Museum of Art, Duluth, MN' "Botanica: Contemporary Artists and the World of Plants" (traveling exhibition) 1999-2001

== Notable collections ==
- Albright-Knox Museum of Art, Buffalo, NY.
- Fisher Landau Center, Long Island City, NY.
- New Mexico Museum of Art, Santa Fe, NM.
