= Ralf Sander =

German sculptor (born 1963)

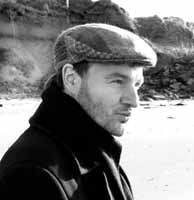
- Born: Ralf Volker Sander; 15 December 1963 (age 62); Berlin, Germany
- Known for: Sculpture

Ralf Volker Sander (born 15 December 1963) is an internationally active German sculptor. His best known works include Lady Bird Transformation(mirage), a public sculpture for Busan Cinema Center, South Korea, commissioned in 2011 and erected in August 2012. The memorial for Martin Heinrich Klaproth was erected on the campus of Technische Universität Berlin, 25 June 1996.

== Early life ==
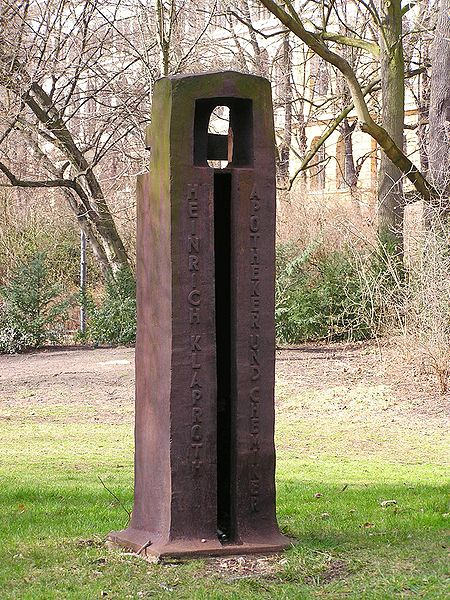
Berlin, Martin Heinrich Klaproth

Born in West Berlin, Sander grew up in the British sector. He studied fine art and the history of art at Berlin University of the Arts, from 1986 to 1988. After the death of his Stepfather, Klaus Komoll, who left him a small sailing vessel, he was able to circumnavigate the world between 1988 and 1990 in order to study the tribal art of the pacific islands and Papua New Guinea. He completed his studies with a postgraduate course in sculpture at the Berlin University of the Arts, between 1991 and 1994. He travelled to China and Japan with a DAAD grant to study Asian Art and philosophy between 1992 and 1994.

== Career ==
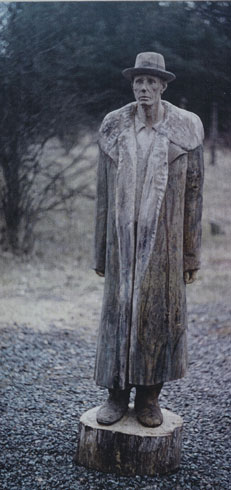
Joseph_Beuys, Oak 2005, Robert Bosch Stiftung Stuttgart, Germany

Almost all of his early works took the human body as its subject and base for human scale wooden sculptures and carvings made from a single log of wood. Sander describes his work as: "encounter with the other side of appearance". His work attempts to treat the body not as an object but a common condition. Since 2000 he experiments with different materials and media, including film. He repeatedly refers in his work on whole social groups and integrates their participation into the working process, (as in:Rolandtransfer, Child's play, Lernen ist sich Oeffnen) relying on Joseph Beuys term Soziale Plastik. In 2003 and 2004, Ralf Sander became visiting professor at Academy of Fine Arts in Warsaw, Poland. The annual exhibition Aquamediale was curated and initiated together with Sieghard Auer in 2005. In the same year, he was also appointed Reader at University of Ulster in Belfast, Northern Ireland. From 2008 to 2012, Ralf Sander worked as professor for sculpture at Seoul National University, South Korea. In 2008, he started the World Saving Machine cycle, a visionary project and inquiry of the impact of science on wider cultural contexts. World Saving Machine I and III are part of the WSM-Project. Both focus on transformation of solar energy into ice– literally, as well as (on a larger scale) metaphorically. World Saving Machine 2 transforms carbon dioxide into oxygen. The project was continued in collaboration with KAIST (Korea Advanced Institute of Science and Technology) University, Daedeok, Korea. In 2010, he became member of the commission board for Expo 2012 in Yeosu, South Korea. One year later, Sander won the international art commission for the Busan Cinema Center. The iconic building is designed by Wolf Prix- Coop Himmelb(l)au, as host of the Busan International Film Festival, Asia's largest film festival. The 10.20m stainless steel sculpture, Lady Bird Transformation, morphs from a striding woman into a sea gull in flight, depending on the angle from which it is viewed.

== Major works ==
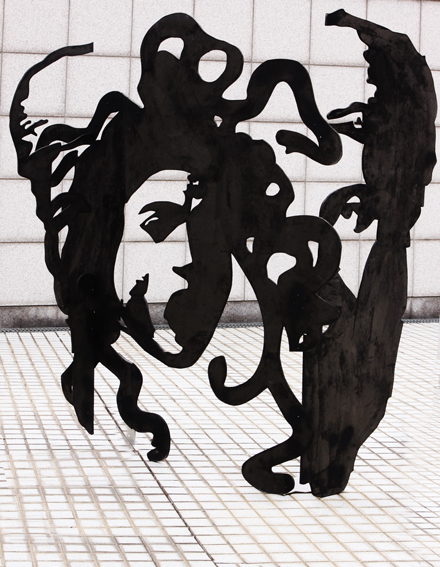
Meduza

- Klaproth Stele (1996) – TU Berlin
- Beuys (1996) – Robert Bosch Stiftung, Stuttgart, Germany
- St Dominicus (1999) – St Bonifaz, Mainz, Germany
- Cube (2001) – Lubben, Brandenburg, Germany
- Mensch aergere Dich nicht (2003)
- Childs Play (2005)
- Rolandtransfer (2006) – permanently installed at Hohenstuecken near Brandenburg, Germany
- World Saving Machine (since 2008) – Crane Art Center, Kaist University, Philadelphia, United States,
- Korean Energy (2011) – acquired by Seoul MoA, Korea University
- Lady Bird Transformation (Mirage, 2012) Busan Film Center, South Korea
- Belfast Seahorse (2013) – at Belfast Harbour, Belfast, Northern Ireland
