= Brigitte Hitschler =

German artist

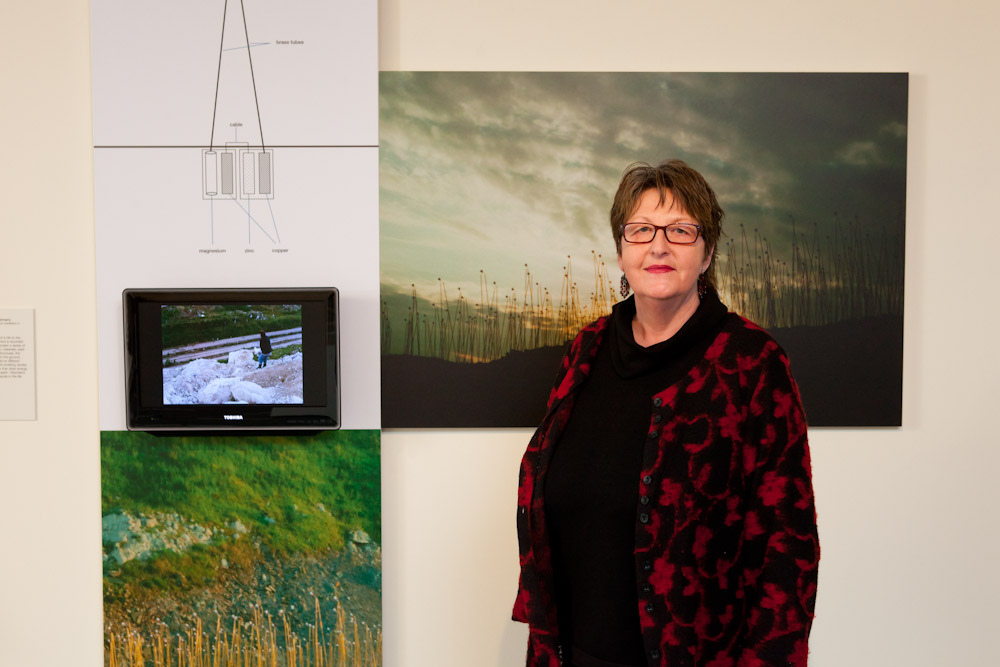
- Hitschler in 2011
- Born: 1954 (age 71–72); Bochum, West Germany (now Germany)
- Education: Technical University of Dortmund; Ruhr University Bochum
- Notable work: Energy field
- Movement: Environmental art

Brigitte Hitschler (born 1954 in Bochum, West Germany) is a German artist. Her work combines her interests in art, science and material culture, and is often environmentally focused.

== Education ==
Hitschler studied art, education, and German at the Technical University of Dortmund and at Ruhr University Bochum. Hitschler works for the [ID]factory at the Technical University of Dortmund.

== Works ==
Hitschler is interested in science and material culture as well as art. Her environmental installation Energy field (1999) reflects all three concerns. It was created on top of a potash slag heap in Hannover-Empelde, Germany. The area was closed in 1972 and slated for reclamation. In 1999, it was opened to artists for an exhibition project. For her installation, Hitschler created 400 light-emitting diodes, which used ongoing chemical processes within the potash heap as a power source. Each diode rested atop two 40 cm long and 2 mm thin brass tubes. The tubes were connected with magnesium, copper and zinc. Galvanic cells absorbed power from the hill to turn on the light. The tiny red diodes were placed in a sixteen-square meter area. Video and photographs documenting the installation have been shown nationally and internationally in exhibits such as Elemental Matters, 2011, at the Chemical Heritage Foundation.

Glimmering lights invoke the slumbering, hidden forces of the hill... They symbolize the past and future energy potential of the place. – Brigitte Hitschler

Hitschler's works include:

- Lüntec, painting, Technology Center Lünen, Germany, 2001
- Energy field, installation, Hannover-Empelde, Germany, 1999; Video-installation, Harenberg City-Center, Dortmund/Germany, 1998
- Dayflies, text collage, Theatre of Hannover, Hannover, Germany, 1998
- Objects, painting & video, Torhaus Rombergpark, Dortmund, Germany, 1998
- Grottenolm, video, Marsberger Musiktage, Marsberg, Germany, 1998
- The way it begins, video installation, art society, Villa Streccius, Landau, Germany, 1998
- not quite the right blue ..., video installation, University of Iowa City, Iowa, USA, 1998
- Wir zweifeln jetzt anders, work in public space, text installation (stainless steel), University of Dortmund, Germany, 1997/98
