= Michael Singer (artist) =

American ecological artist

- Born: 1945
- Died: 2024 (aged 78–79)
- Known for: Sculpture, ecological infrastructure, landscape design
- Notable work: Sculptural Flood Wall (1988); 27th Avenue Solid Waste Transfer and Recycling Center (1993)
- Awards: Guggenheim Fellowship; Arts and Letters Award in Art (2019)

Michael Singer (1945–2024) was an American sculptor and designer whose work integrated art, landscape design, and ecological infrastructure. His career spanned more than four decades, beginning with minimalist outdoor and indoor sculptural installations that often utilized natural materials.

== Career ==
Singer first gained international attention in the 1970s, participating in exhibitions at the Solomon R. Guggenheim Museum (Theodoron Awards, 1971) and documenta 6 in Kassel, Germany (1977). His 1984 solo exhibition at the Solomon R. Guggenheim Museum was documented in the monograph Michael Singer by curator Diane Waldman.

In the 1980s, Singer established an interdisciplinary studio to support large-scale, collaborative commissions. He completed site-specific projects internationally, including a courtyard garden for the United States Embassy in Athens, Greece (2007); the Atria Gardens at the Alterra Environmental Research Center in the Netherlands; and the Memorial Garden, known in German as Grottenloch, in Stuttgart, Germany.

From the 1990s onward, Singer’s work focused on the intersection of public art, urban planning, and ecological infrastructure. He collaborated with planners and engineers on projects designed to address environmental systems, such as water filtration and habitat restoration. He co-authored Infrastructure and Community, published by the Environmental Defense Fund. His later work included the Marine Living Structures Initiative, which developed modular, biologically engineered habitats for coral reefs.

Along with his studio team and collaborating engineers, Michael Singer led the creation of several infrastructure projects including flood walls, power plants and recycling facilities. His Sculptural Flood Wall in Grand Rapids, Michigan (1988) was a collaborative effort to reimagine a conventional engineered flood wall to preserve existing trees, filter stormwater and regenerate habitat. Singer’s 27th Avenue Solid Waste Transfer and Recycling Center (1993) in Phoenix, Arizona, with artist Linnea Glatt was an early precedent for how artists can help shape the vision of a new infrastructure facility and reimagine its program as an environmentally driven and community engaged civic asset. Writing in The New York Times, architecture critic Herbert Muschamp described the project as part of “an ambitious program that joins art to infrastructure,” noting its transformation of a landfill into a civic landmark. Singer’s studio later led the planning and initial design for the Solid Waste Authority of Palm Beach County's Renewable Energy Facility 2, which was completed in 2015. The SWA complex integrates a 1-million-gallon rainwater harvesting tank for facility process water, a LEED Platinum Visitor’s Center with a skybridge tour, green walls, and a parking lot solar array. Other regenerative infrastructure projects by Singer and his studio include the Living Dock (2009) and the South Cove (2012) in West Palm Beach, Florida, and the Living Shoreline Mangrove Planter (2015) in Lake Worth Beach, Florida. These built sculptural projects foster the regeneration of mangrove, oyster and seagrass habitat within human made structures.

The breadth of Singer’s work is documented in The Re-enchantment of Nature and Urban Space: Michael Singer Projects in Art, Design and Environmental Regeneration by Else Marie Bukdahl. The publication accompanied exhibitions including Michael Singer: Projects in Art, Design and Environmental Regeneration at the Utzon Center in Aalborg, Denmark (2011), and Engaging Architecture, Landscape and Ecological Renewal / The Work of Artist Michael Singer at the Danish Architecture Center in Copenhagen (2011–2012).

== Collections and awards ==
Singer received fellowships from the National Endowment for the Arts and the John Simon Guggenheim Memorial Foundation. In 2019, he received the Arts and Letters Award in Art from the American Academy of Arts and Letters.

His work is held in the permanent collections of numerous institutions, including:

- Museum of Modern Art (MoMA), New York
- National Gallery of Australia, Canberra
- Louisiana Museum of Modern Art, Denmark
