= Tony Price (artist) =

Tony Price (1937–2000) was a junk artist, painter, sculptor, self-styled "Atomic Artist" and outspoken anti-nuclear activist.

== Early life ==
Price was a born in Brooklyn, New York, along with his twin brother, Ted, and sister Carolyn to Thomas Edward Price and Katherine. After he finished high school he spent some time in the Marine Corps. After he was discharged in 1960, he traveled extensively, before arriving in Santa Fe in 1965.

== Nuclear art ==
After visiting Los Alamos National Laboratory in 1967 and discovering their salvage yard, he began to create utilitarian objects such as chairs and tables and musical instruments, especially wind chimes and gongs, out of their discarded scraps. He later moved on to creating sculptures, and his most famous works are a group of primitive-inspired masks created out of scrap metal, many of them based on Hopi kachinas. In 1983 filmmakers Glen Silber and Claudia Vianello completed a documentary on price titled "Atomic Artist" that aired nationally on PBS in 1986. In September 1986, Price was given a solo exhibition in the New Mexico Governor's Gallery at the state capitol. The New Mexico Museum of Art organized a major retrospective in 2004 that traveled to the United Nations in 2005.
