= Heidi Quante =

American interdisciplinary artist

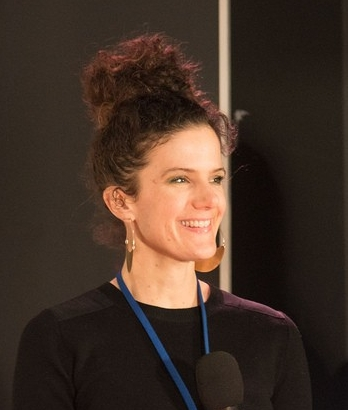
Quante, Paris, 2015

Heidi Quante is an interdisciplinary artist who has been designing environmental and human rights public engagement initiatives since 2003.

== Education ==
Quante attended the University of California, Berkeley and received a Bachelor of Arts in Cultural Anthropology and a Bachelor of Science in Ecology.

== Career ==
Her artwork is divided into two practices. One is personal, exploring her emotional and physical interactions with the changing environment. The other consciously engages the public in participatory artworks ranging in size from one on one personal interactions to large scale global participatory artworks. Her artworks often address social and environmental issues like climate change.

=== Creative Catalysts ===
Quante founded Creative Catalysts in 2013. Creative Catalysts collaborates with experts from diverse disciplines: art, science, community organizing and multimedia to design new initiatives for social challenges including climate change. Their initiatives seek to raise awareness, inspire dialogue and spark action on pressing social and environmental issues.

== Artworks ==
=== High Water Line ===
Quante is the co director of the High Water Line which supports individuals and communities at various levels to help them realize this innovative way of visualizing climate change.

==== The Bureau of Linguistical Reality ====
In 2014 Quante Co-Created the social engagement artwork The Bureau of Linguistical Reality with fellow artist Alicia Escott. The Bureau of Linguistical Reality is an ongoing social engagement artwork that collaborates with the public to create new words for feelings and experiences of living in the Anthropocene.

WeAreWater

Since 2016, Quante has been exploring diverse water sources that she is connected to. Uba Seo, the first audio video artwork of WeAreWater, was Official Selection of the 2022 Wild and Scenic Film Festival. Meditations on a Glacier, an audio video artwork on the source of Quante's drinking water, premiered at Swissnex in San Francisco in 2025 as part of the United Nations Year of the Glaciers.
