= Sustainable art =

Art that is produced with sustainability as a key principle

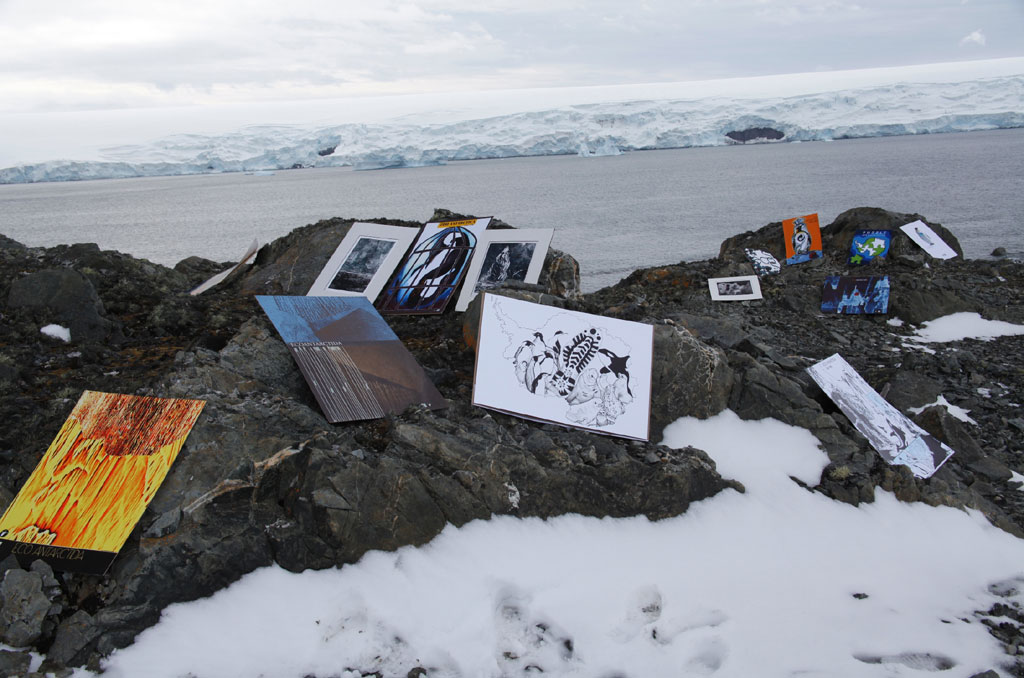
Eco art on display.

Sustainable art is art in harmony with the key principles of sustainability, which include ecology, social justice, non-violence and grassroots democracy. Through the combination of artistic expression, creativity, and eco-friendly approach, sustainable art aims to address and raise public awareness about environmental issues. Sustainable art practices range from environmentally friendly materials to contemporary technological solutions that reduce waste and improve the practicality and durability of the products. The most common materials used in sustainable art include natural pigments, minerals, and recycled plastic waste, which deal with environmental hazards effectively and are safe for human exposure.

== History ==
According to the contemporary art historians and curators Maja and Reuben Fowkes, the origins of sustainable art can be traced to the conceptual art of the late 1960s and early 1970s, which stressed dematerialisation and questioned the functioning of the art system. They also connect the rise of the concept of sustainability to the ending of the Cold War in 1989 and the emergence of a new awareness of the global character of ecological and social problems. Sustainable art adopts, according to these authors, a critical position towards some key practitioners in the land art movement of the 1960s, who showed little concern for the environmental consequences of treating the landscape like a giant canvas with a bulldozer for a brush. They have questioned the polemical division between 'autonomous' and 'instrumental' art originating with modernism, arguing that it is 'autonomy that gives art, as well as artists as social actors, the potential to be free and able to offer alternatives to dominant ideological paradigms.'

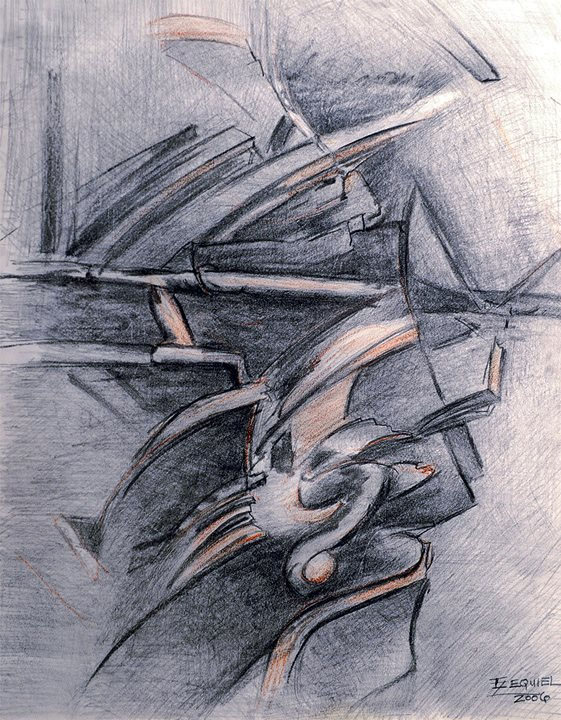
Sustainable by artist Ezequiel Jimenez.

Since 2005 there is a Sustainable Arts Biennale running at Ihlienworth near Hamburg, Germany, curated by the German conceptional artist and curator Samuel J. Fleiner.

There are a range of interpretations over the relations between art and sustainability, besides the term 'sustainable art' promoted by Maja and Reuben Fowkes: Other authors prefer the broader notions of 'sustainability arts' or 'art and sustainability' (e.g. Sacha Kagan and Volker Kirchberg). Still others explicitly rejected the use of the term 'sustainable art', referring instead to 'artistic work that inspires us to think about sustainability" (Margot Käßmann).

Professional discussion of the relationship of contemporary art to notions of sustainability blossomed across Europe in the early years 2000, with e.g. the conference of the German Society for Political Culture (Instituts für Kulturpolitik der Kulturpolitischen Gesellschaft e.V.), in January 2002 at the Art Academy of Berlin, and the 'Tutzinger Manifest'. An International Symposium on Sustainability and Contemporary Art took place at Central European University, in Budapest (Hungary) in March 2006. This was the first in a series of international symposia organised by Maja and Reuben Fowkes bringing together contemporary artists, philosophers, environmental sciences and activists to explore common ground around issues such as 'Exit or Activism' (2008), 'Hard Realities and the New Materiality' (2009) and 'Art, Post-Fordism and Eco-Critique' (2010). In March–April 2007 at the Leuphana University Lüneburg, the Arts Research Network of the European Sociological Association focused its attention on the recent movements and approaches to 'arts and sustainability' at its biennial conference.

Key texts in the emerging field of sustainable art include 'Kultur - Kunst - Nachhaltigkeit' (2002) by Hildegard Kurt and Bernd Wagner, ‘The Principles of Sustainability in Contemporary Art’ (2006) by Maja and Reuben Fowkes and 'Art and Sustainability' (2011) by Sacha Kagan. A collection of interdisciplinary analyses of the arts and cultures with relationship to sustainability is available in 'Sustainability: a new frontier for the arts and cultures' (2008) edited by Sacha Kagan and Volker Kirchberg.

Exhibitions devoted explicitly to "sustainable art" include e.g. ‘Beyond Green: Towards a Sustainable Art’ at the Smart Museum in Chicago in November 2005. For an analysis of the conflictual politics of sustainability and the ambiguity of the term sustainability (which oscillates between "ecological sustainability" and "economic sustainable development," see TJ Demos, “The Politics of Sustainability: Art and Ecology” (2009). For a recent account of the multi-faceted role of contemporary art in highlighting environmental issues, expressing criticism towards unsustainable factors in society, and offering imaginative solutions for the achievement of sustainability, see Maja and Reuben Fowkes's essay on 'Art and Sustainability' in Enough for All Forever (2012).

=== Sustainable art artists ===
Artists who engage with sustainable art include artists who are using non-toxic, sustainable materials in their art practices, as well as those who integrate conceptual ideas of sustainability into their work. Washington, DC–based glass sculptor Erwin Timmers incorporates some of the least recycled building materials into their work; structural glass. Ekaterina Orlovie is an artist who has used a sustainable, non-toxic material in her artwork before. Using an air purifying paint additive, named Photio, mixed with the paint Orlovie created a mural for California Clean Air Day in Riverside, California.

== Sustainable art practices and materials ==
Sustainability and art are vastly interlinked. Besides transforming an abstract idea into a tangible outcome, sustainable art also raises awareness about environmental issues and encourages new ways of thinking through the set of innovative practices and materials. As ecological considerations are at the core of this mission, practices often involve recycling and use of eco-friendly materials, including natural pigments, agricultural waste, and renewable substances.

=== Natural pigments ===
Natural pigments, opposed to synthetic dyes that lead to chemical waste and pollution, are biodegradable and have non-toxic components that are both environmentally friendly and safe for human health. Although they are mostly extracted from fruits and plants, natural pigments can also be derived from a variety of microbes and minerals. One of the most common pigments is authocyanin, found in red or blue fruits, such as blueberries and grapes. Authocyanin is a water-soluble natural pigment which exposure to light allows it to produce color, while chemical changes in pH value (potential of Hydrogen) lead to an increased diversity of color palette and intensity. This structure makes plant-based natural pigments an efficient alternative of synthetic dyes that are widely used in a number of industries, including fashion, cosmetics, and medicine.

=== Earth pigments ===
Earth pigments, a smaller category of natural pigments, are derived from minerals and have been an essential part of arts since prehistoric times. Early civilizations used natural minerals, like charcoal or rocks, as a means of paint found in cave paintings and rock art.

The available colors that could have been produced included shades of black, yellow, and red. These earth pigments are commonly referred to as “ochre” (Greek for yellow) and contain iron oxide and clay. The yellow color is produced through washing, while red ochre, for example, that appears naturally in volcanic areas, requires additional heating procedures. The length of the heating process determines the intensity and shade of the hue. Being one of the least expensive and yet most durable and long-lasting types of paint, ochres require only a small amount of effort to produce and are widely used in modern arts as well. The contemporary usage appears not only in paints, but also in the construction and coating industries.

=== Recycled plastic ===
The use of plastic waste in contemporary art is an ongoing trend that supports sustainability and encourages creative thinking. Especially in a modern setting where plastic takes up a high percentage in packaging materials, accumulated plastic waste is one of the biggest environmental pollutants. Because of its variety, plastic has been largely utilized in a number of artistic disciplines, ranging from different art installations to collages and sculptures.

Although it is sometimes considered challenging due to differences in quality and accessibility to recycle the plastic waste, the entire process enhances the artist’s creativity while working with a non-traditional material. Even when this method is not new and dates back to the 20th century where Marcel Duchamp, for example, integrated bicycle tires in his sculpture, it is nowadays equally widespread and efficient for reducing environmental harm.

== See also ==
- Land art
- Systems art
- Sustainable design
