= Sue Spaid =

American museum curator (born 1961)

Sue Spaid (born 1961) is an American curator and philosopher, currently based in Belgium.

Spaid’s thematic exhibitions feature all types of art, though she is most known for experiential exhibitions, such as “Action Station: Exploring Open Systems” (1995) at the Santa Monica Museum of Art; “Comestible Compost” (1998) at the Pavilions Marketplace in West Hollywood; “Cremolata Flotage” (1999) on the Andrew J. Barberi Staten Island Ferry; “An Active Life” (2000) at the Contemporary Arts Center, Cincinnati; “Hovering Above” (2008) and “Endurance: Visualizing Time” (2009) for the Abington Art Center Sculpture Park in Jenkintown, Pennsylvania; and “Microfibers” (2009) at Locks Gallery, Philadelphia. She has organized career surveys for Jim Isermann (1993, Sue Spaid Fine Art), Robert Overby (1994, Sue Spaid Fine Art), Lynne Berman/ Kathy Chenoweth (1997, Special K), Eileen Cowin (2000, Armory Center for the Arts) and Jim Shaw (2000, The Contemporary Arts Center, Cincinnati).

== Early life and education ==
Spaid was born in Pittsburgh and grew up in Saudi Arabia, where her father George Spaid worked for Saudi Aramco as a petroleum engineer. Her interest in contemporary art began while living in Austin, during the early eighties, but intensified when she moved to New York City in 1984, affording her regular visits to East Village and Soho galleries.

Spaid earned a B.S. in Chemical Engineering from the University of Texas at Austin in 1983, an M.A. in Philosophy from Columbia University in New York City in 1999, and a PhD in Philosophy from Temple University in Philadelphia in 2013 for the dissertation Work and World: On the Philosophy of Curatorial Practice.

== Career ==
Since 1984, Spaid has lived in New York City, Los Angeles, Cincinnati, Philadelphia and Baltimore, where she has been active in the art world as a collector, art writer, curator and adjunct professor. While Curator at the Contemporary Arts Center, Cincinnati (1999–2002), she curated fourteen solo shows, organized five thematic exhibitions and authored the book Ecovention: Current Art to Transform Ecologies to accompany the exhibition, co-curated with Amy Lipton. In 2010, she was awarded an Emily Hall Tremaine Exhibition Award to produce "Green Acres: Artists Farming Fields, Greenhouses and Abandoned Lots". In 2012, "Green Acres" opened at the Contemporary Arts Center, Cincinnati, Ohio, and traveled to the Arlington Art Center, Arlington, Virginia, and the American University Museum, Washington, DC.

Between 2010 and 2012, Spaid was Executive Director of The Contemporary, Baltimore. While at the Contemporary Museum, she published A Field Guide to Patricia Johanson's Works: Built, Proposed, Collected & Published and edited Contemporary Museum: 20 Years.

Spaid has taught courses at Art Center College of Design (1993–1998), Otis College of Art and Design (1996–1998), University of Cincinnati (2004–2006), Temple University (2006–2008), and Drexel University (2010).

As an independent curator, Spaid has organized exhibitions for artist-run spaces, university galleries, commercial galleries and museums, including the Abington Art Center, Armory Center for the Arts, Bellevue Arts Museum, Los Angeles Contemporary Exhibitions, Mississippi Museum of Art, P.P.O.W. Gallery, Santa Monica Museum of Art, SPACES in Cleveland, and The Suburban. In 2005, she and Patrizia Giambi discovered and documented the remains of Robert Smithson’s Asphalt Rundown (1969) in a quarry outside of Rome, Italy, an experience Spaid documented in Domus. During her 2005-2006 “Yes Brainer Tour,” she traveled via car through 38 states presenting “The Gist of Isness,” based on an essay published in X-tra and delivered at the 2006 Pacific Division Meeting of the American Philosophical Association in Portland, Oregon.

Spaid has curated shows within shows, “Migration Platform” within “Once Upon a Time in the West” (2007), curated by Mark Harris; “Artists’ Installation Instructions” appeared both in “appropriately enough” (2004) at Warsaw Projects, Cincinnati, OH and “view do” (2005) at the Suburban, Oak Park, IL.

=== Performance ===
Spaid's performance career began at Beyond Baroque, Venice, CA; where she read “This Aint No Manifesta” during Manifesto Night (1992, interpreted “Vindicating the Vulva” during Erotica Night (1996), and Tree-Top awarded cultural heroes (1997) during July 4 Readings. Tree-top is one of several alter egos (plus Pippi and Dragon-Princess) who have performed and exhibited since the mid-1990s. Spaid modeled outfits designed by Antonio Gomez-Bueno during “The Gomez-Bueno Spiritual Fashion Show” (1993); Gomez-Bueno and Pippi during the "Food House Fashion Show" (1994) and Lun*na Menoh in "He(ad)dress" (1997). The Dragon Princess launched her "presidential campaign" at the Lotus Motel (1995). In 1997, Spaid hosted the live talk-show “Trailblazing the Economies of Art” in the Barnsdall Art Park auditorium. She played a cameo role in Martin Durazo’s film Suck It Up (1998). As "Olga the May-Day Nymph", she performed only once at Dirt (1998), Los Angeles, CA. Works created by Tri Via, a collaboration between her alter egos were exhibited in “Grouptopia” (2001) at Warsaw Projects, Cincinnati, OH; and “Tasty Buds” (2003) at The Work Space, New York City, NY. In the mid-1990s, Spaid co-wrote for Coagula under the pen name Miles Tut-Hill.

In addition to collaborating with Alysse Stepanian on the multi-media event scourge.org at OnetoManyThree (1999), Spaid performed “Suitably Contrite” (1998) (Socrates' The Apology & Dave Soldier soundtrack) at TwoMANYtwo. In 2000, Jan Baum Gallery presented “Used and Amused,” which featured works by twelve artists who had used Spaid as their muse.

== Sue Spaid Fine Art ==
From 1990 to 1995, Spaid’s Los Angeles gallery presented shows by artists including Michael Joaquin Grey and David Schafer.

The New York Times featured Spaid as the cover image that accompanied Roberta Smith’s story “The Art World’s New Image,” December 29, 1992.

== Publications ==
Spaid currently contributes to the Flemish art magazine H art. From 2003-2012, she was a member of the Contributors Board for artUS, having written regularly for this LA art publication and its predecessor ArtText since 1997. She has also written for Art issues, Art in America, LA Weekly, Village Voice and New Art Examiner.

List of Books and Catalogues:

The Philosophy of Curatorial Practice, Between Work and World, (Bloomsbury Academic, 2020)

Ecovention Europe: Art to Transform Ecologies, 1957-2017 (Sittard: De Domijnen Hegendaagse Kunst, 2017)

Patricia Johanson's Environmental Remedies: Connecting Soil to Water (Millersville, Millersville University, 2016)

Green Acres: Artists Farming Fields, Greenhouses and Abandoned Lots (Cincinnati: Contemporary Arts Center, 2012)

A Field Guide to Patricia Johanson’s Work: Built, Proposed, Collected and Published (Baltimore: Contemporary Museum, 2012)

Ecovention: Current Art to Transform Ecologies (Cincinnati: Contemporary Arts Center, 2002)

Eileen Cowin: Work 1971-1998 (Pasadena: Armory Center for the Arts, 2000)

Under Construction: Rethinking Images of Identity (Pasadena: Armory Center for the Arts, 1995)
