= United States Society for Education through Art =

American national association

The United States Society for Education through Art (USSEA) is an American national association whose members work in curriculum development, teaching and research related to art education and cultural differences, and who share interests in art educational content and strategies which promote tolerance and appreciation of the arts of non-mainstream cultural peoples. The mission of the society is to promote greater understanding and respect for learners from all ethnic, minority, and socio-cultural backgrounds through research, art curricula, instruction, and practices that are inclusive and culturally sensitive.

The society provides a platform for networking and a resource base for art educators nationally and internationally, who seek to work collaboratively on projects of interest to multicultural or cross-cultural communities and students, publishes instructional resources for classroom teachers, encourages and sponsors cross-cultural research, and facilitates international and intra-national professional relationships through online sites, symposia, conferences, and publications.

Each year, USSEA honors one national and one international art educator, each of whom has demonstrated exemplary teaching, service, or research in the area of multicultural or cross-cultural art education with the Ziegfeld Art Education award. The Journal of Cultural Research in Art Education is a publication of USSEA that is made available to all members of the art educational profession. Through the website, members may access suggestions and recommendations for appropriate multi-culturally oriented K-12 art lessons, and receive up-to-date news and information about USSEA initiatives, programs and opportunities. Additionally, exhibitions of children's art from countries around the world are presented at national conferences of art educators and through an online gallery of children's art, which is organized by topical themes and maintained on the USSEA website.

== History ==
USSEA was founded in 1977 as an affiliate of the International Society for Education Through Art (InSEA) and the National Art Education Association (NAEA). The goals of USSEA reflect, on a national level, the goals of its international parent organization InSEA, which in turn, was inspired by the spirit of postwar hope and optimism of its parent affiliate UNESCO. In a paper describing the early history of InSEA, the motivational energy and overarching goals of UNESCO and InSEA are explained.

"The world had just come through a terrible and protracted war, one initiated by false philosophies working on ignorance through massive control of free speech. The impulse in 1945, to try to ensure that it did not happen again, and that people should understand each other better through education and all forms of cultural and scientific exchanges, the passionate emphasis on truth, justice, peace and the importance of the individual – these impulses were irresistible."

These sentiments, which gave root to InSEA in 1954, are also guiding principles of USSEA. Art educator Kenneth Marantz was instrumental in establishing the United States organization and served as its first president. Other founding members who served as officers included Maryl Fletcher De Jong, Larry Kantner, Eugenia Oole, Helen Patton, and Tom Sletterhaugh.

== Sponsored Activities ==
As a means of disseminating shared ideas about the importance of teaching art to increasingly diverse populations and to develop research agenda for determining effective practices of multicultural art education, USSEA began sponsoring conferences and symposia. Fourteen such events were held between 1977 and 2010. The topics addressed included "Limits and Extents of International Research in Art Education" (1977), "Art Education: The Pacific Basin" (1982), "International Aspects of Teaching Aesthetics and Critical Skills" (1987), "Indigenous People, Art, and Place: Interactions of Culture and Environment in Contemporary Life" (1994) and "Crossing Cultural, Artistic, and Cyber Borders" (2000), and "Youth and Community Development: How the Arts Serve Economically Impoverished Communities" (2010). The 1991 USSEA Symposium, "Beyond the Traditional in Art: Facing a Pluralistic Society," resulted in the publication of working papers and research agenda that helped focus cultural art educational research and practices during the late 20th and early 21st century.

Since 1986, USSEA has presented two annual awards in the name of Edwin Ziegfeld, founding president of InSEA (1954–1960) and NAEA (1947–1951), to honor an American art educator and a foreign art educator who have made distinguished leadership contributions to international art education. These awards are presented to the recipients during a USSEA Awards banquet held during the annual NAEA conference.

The first issue of the USSEA publication The Journal of Multicultural and Cross-cultural Research in Art Education was issued in 1983 with Larry Kantner as senior editor. In 2001, the title of the journal was changed to the Journal of Cultural Research in Art Education (JCRAE). Articles published in JCRAE focus on social/cultural research relevant for art education, including cultural foundations of art education, cross-cultural and multicultural research in art education, and cultural aspects of art in education. These areas may be interpreted in a broad sense to include arts administration, art therapy, community arts organizations, and other disciplinary and interdisciplinary approaches relevant to art education. Articles considered for publication may feature theoretical research and research in which qualitative and/or quantitative methods as well as other formats and strategies are employed. In addition to the publication of a journal, USSEA sponsors monographs and sponsors or endorses books that address issues of interest and concern to art educators.
