= Social Pool =

Artwork by Austrian artist Alfredo Barsuglia

Social Pool is an artwork created in 2014 by the Austrian artist Alfredo Barsuglia. The work consists of a swimming pool that is five feet deep, five feet wide, and eleven feet long. The pool is in an isolated location in the Mojave Desert in Southern California, United States.

The pool was open to anyone to use, but users of the pool must contact the West Hollywood art institute, the MAK Center for Art and Architecture, to obtain the GPS coordinates and a key to open the cover. As stipulated by the artist, only one person or a small group may use the pool and the key must then be returned to the MAK Center within 24 hours. Users must also take a gallon of water with them to replace any water that has evaporated from the pool. The exact location of the pool was originally intended to remain unknown to the general public, however, aerial photography from Google Maps reveals its location to be in southwestern San Bernardino County at approximately 34.4494°N 116.7239°W. The pool officially closed on September 30, 2014, though it continued to see use until it was vandalized in April or May 2016.

== Design ==
The pool is white in design and unadorned by signs. The title of the artwork is reflected in the pool's design; the size enables "one or two people to stand or sit on either of its sides" with a bench is incorporated into each side. The institute describes the walls of each segment of the pool as being "...so high that the seated person cannot easily see whoever sits in the adjacent space, despite the fact that they are just next-door."

The physical isolation of the pool has been likened to American land art installations in deserts, including Walter de Maria’s The Lightning Field in New Mexico, Robert Smithson’s Spiral Jetty, and Nancy Holt’s Sun Tunnels in Utah.

== Commentary ==
The MAK Center describes the pool as "Astutely intertwining the semantic constructs of contemporary art, the pool (the symbol of carefree wealth, even more so in the desert), relaxation and nature, Social Pool is a complex replica of the contradictions and ideology of contemporary society, where remoteness from others and quietude are luxuries for the ever-communicating city-dweller" and a work that "....simultaneously embodies the massive socio-economic changes that have taken place in the last forty years. It thus understands itself as the product of an economy in which privacy and immateriality have been fully commodified."

Barsuglia sees his pool as part of a critical commentary on California's swimming pools, stating that "In a desolate and drought-hit area, a pool is something absurd...Luxury goods are status symbols – things that are expensive but not important to survival."
