= The Long Shot (2025 film) =

2025 film by Austin Nichols

- Directed by: Austin Nichols
- Written by: Drew Mackintosh
- Produced by: Jennifer Kuczaj; Christian Sosa; Jon Wroblewski
- Starring: Ryan Hansen; Adrianne Palicki; Justin Chatwin; Reggie Bush
- Cinematography: Peter B. Kowalski
- Edited by: Noam Klement; Brian Scofield
- Music by: Sam Lipman
- Production companies: Roosevelt Film Lab; Pong Jane Productions
- Distributed by: Vantage Media
- Release dates: April 25, 2025 (DIFF); April 10, 2026 (United States)
- Running time: 95 minutes
- Country: United States
- Language: English

The Long Shot, previously titled The Salamander King, is a 2025 American sports comedy film directed by Austin Nichols in his feature directorial debut, from a screenplay by Drew Mackintosh. It stars Ryan Hansen, Adrianne Palicki, Justin Chatwin and Reggie Bush in a cameo role.

Set in Austin, Texas, the film follows an ensemble cast of eccentric and misfit locals trying to save their beloved golf course.

== Plot ==
Ray Mueller is a self-proclaimed lovable slacker who lives and works at the city’s historic municipal golf course, aka Muny. His world is turned upside down when Samantha Lambert, a pragmatic consultant, comes to town with the mission of determining whether the course has legitimate reasons to exist. On a quest to prove Muny's value, Ray and his group of misfits will have to face many obstacles, including Dylan Hench, an eccentric billionaire and tech guru with his own agenda, which happens to be Samantha's boyfriend.

== Cast ==
- Ryan Hansen as Ray Mueller
- Adrianne Palicki as Samantha Lambert
- Justin Chatwin as Dylan Hench
- Dulcé Sloan as Roberta Solomon
- Brad Leland as Councilman Hager
- Bill Wise as Dale Stockton
- Temple Baker as Travis Burnett
- Bobo Hoang as Danny Nguyen
- Christopher St. Mary as Quentin Loneman
- Aaron G. Hale as Jay Crowley
- Lilit Bush as Elise Crowley
- Joe Hursley as Sir James
- Reggie Bush as Dan Starling (cameo)

== Production ==
Initially, the project had been pitched as a tv series by the director Austin Nichols and writer Drew Mackintosh. They ultimately decided to turn it into a feature film and look for independent financing in order to have full creative control. The film's story is loosely inspired by the 'Save Muny' campaign, an ongoing community effort in Austin, Texas, dedicated to preserving the Lions Municipal Golf Course.

Principal photography began on May 28, 2024, and wrapped on June 20, 2024, after 20 filming days. The film was shot in and around Austin, Texas, in various locations including Mayfield Park, Krause Springs, Mount Bonnell and Willie Nelson's Cut-N-Putt.

== Release ==
The Long Shot had its world premiere at the Dallas International Film Festival on April 25, 2025. It also screened at the Austin Film Festival on October 25, 2025.

VMI Worldwide through their U.S. distribution arm Vantage Media acquired the domestic rights to the film and released it on digital and video on demand platforms on April 10, 2026.

== Reception ==
In her review for MovieWeb, Bianca Piazza gave a 3/5 rating. Although she thinks the film "offers little newness, its heart and levity may be worth it for those craving a heartily nostalgic and utterly buoyant viewing experience."

Ethan Padgett of Film Threat gave a 9/10 rating and said the film "is ripe for the summer season! It is another great golf comedy and deserves to be alongside Caddyshack and Happy Gilmore."

Kip Mooney of College Movie Review gave the film a rating of B and said The Long Shot "may not win any points for originality, but it scores plenty of laughs and goodwill."
