= Nancy Holt =

American artist (1938–2014)

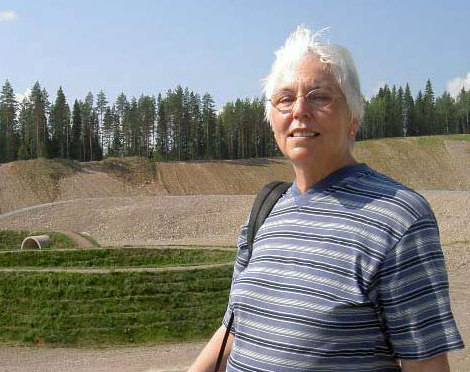
- Holt and her work, Up and Under, in Hämeenkyrö municipality, Finland
- Born: April 5, 1938; Worcester, Massachusetts, US
- Died: February 8, 2014 (aged 75); New York City, US
- Known for: Sculpture, photography, film, writing
- Movement: Environmental art and land art
- Spouse: Robert Smithson (m. 1963; died 1973)

Nancy Holt (April 5, 1938 – February 8, 2014) was an American artist most known for her public sculpture, installation art, concrete poetry, and land art. Throughout her career, Holt also produced works in other media, including film and photography. Since 2018, her legacy has been cared for by Holt/Smithson Foundation.

== Biography ==
Nancy Holt was born in Worcester, Massachusetts, in 1938. An only child, she spent a great deal of her childhood in New Jersey, where her father worked as a chemical engineer and her mother was a homemaker. She studied biology at Tufts University in Medford, Massachusetts. Nancy graduated in 1960 and went on a trip to Europe with her friends. Three years after graduating, she married fellow land art artist Robert Smithson in 1963. In 1968, Holt along with Robert Smithson and Michael Heizer visited the American West for the first time, which culminated in her photographic series Western Graveyards which focused on the cemeteries of Virginia City, Nevada and Lone Pine, California. This trip was a catalyst in formalizing her artistic language and location-based works.

Holt began her artistic career as a photographer and as a video artist. In 1974, she collaborated with fellow artist Richard Serra on Boomerang, in which he videotaped her listening to her own voice echoing back into a pair of headphones after a time lag, as she described the disorienting experience.

Her involvement with photography and camera optics are thought to have influenced her later earthworks, which are "literally seeing devices, fixed points for tracking the positions of the sun, earth and stars." Today Holt is most widely known for her large-scale environmental works, Sun Tunnels and Dark Star Park. However, she created site and time-specific environmental works in public places all over the world. Holt contributed to various publications, which have featured both her written articles and photographs. She also authored several books. Holt received five National Endowment for the Arts Fellowships, New York Creative Artist Fellowships, and a Guggenheim Fellowship. Holt along with Beverly Pepper was a recipient of the International Sculpture Center's 2013 Lifetime Achievement in Contemporary Sculpture Award. From 1995 to 2013, she worked and resided in Galisteo, New Mexico.

In 2008 Holt helped rally opposition to a plan for exploratory drilling near the site of Smithson's Spiral Jetty at the Great Salt Lake in rural Utah. After Smithson's death, Holt never remarried. Holt died in New York City on February 8, 2014, at the age of 75.

== Artistic style ==
=== The land art tradition ===
Holt is associated with earthworks or land art. Land art emerged in the 1960s, coinciding with a growing ecology movement in the United States, which asked people to become more aware of the negative impact they can have on the natural environment. Land art changed the way people thought of art; it took art out of the gallery or museum and into the natural landscape, the product of which were huge works engaging elements of the environment. Unlike much of the commercialized art during this time period, land art could not be bought or sold on the art market. Thus, it shifted the perspective of how people all over the world viewed art.

Land art was typically created in remote, uninhabited regions of the country, particularly the Southwest. Some attribute this popular location for land art to artists’ need to escape the turmoil in the United States during the 1960s and 70s by turning to the open, uncorrupted land of the West. Holt believed this artistic movement came about in the United States due to the vastness of the American landscape. As a result of earthworks not being easily accessible to the public, documentation in photographs, videos, drawings became imperative to their being seen. The first exhibit of contemporary land art was at the Virginia Dwan Gallery in New York in 1968. Other earth artists who emerged during this period include Robert Smithson, James Turrell, Walter De Maria, Michael Heizer, Dennis Oppenheim and Peter Hutchinson.

=== Perception of time and space ===
Holt's works of art often deal with issues of how people perceive time and space. The various monumental works she created blend with and complement their environment. Works such as Hydra’s Head do not merely sit in their environments, but are made of the land, stand on it and are created to be harmonious with the land. The pools in this work are at the top of concrete tubes imbedded in the ground. The land already at the site surrounds these pools. They reflect the natural landscape, while not disturbing it. Holt thought about human scale in relation to the works she created. People can interact with the works and become more aware of space, of their own visual perception, and of the order of the universe. Holt's works incorporate the passage of time and also function to keep time. For example, Annual Ring functions so that when sunlight falls through the hole in the dome and fits perfectly into a ring on the ground, it is solar noon on the summer solstice. At different times, the sun falls differently on the work and other holes in the dome align with celestial occurrences. Holt has said that she is concerned with making art that not only makes an impact visually, but is also functional and necessary in society, as seen in works like Sky Mound, which serves a dual function as a sculpture and park and it also generates alternative energy.

In her works, Holt created an intimate connection to nature and the stars, saying, "I feel that the need to look at the sky-at the moon and the stars-is very basic, and it is inside all of us. So when I say my work is an exteriorization of my own inner reality, I mean I am giving back to people through art what they already have in them."

== Collaboration ==
Collaboration with architects, engineers, construction crews and the like is an essential part of creating land art. Solar Rotary is a work located on the campus of the University of South Florida in Tampa, Florida. The work, consists of 20 ft (6.1 m). aluminum poles topped with a swirl of metal called a shadow caster, which casts a circle of light on a central seat when it is solar noon on the day of the summer solstice. On five days a year at different times, the shadow caster is designed to create a circle of light around plaques placed in the ground that mark important events in Florida's history. Thus, for Solar Rotary, Holt employed Dr. Jack Robinson, an archaeo-astronomer and professor to help her, among other things, to plot the sun's coordinates for the work. For almost all of Holt's works, she worked with a collaborator and or collaborators. For Dark Star Park, Holt coordinated with developer J.W. Kaempfer, Jr., of the Kaempfer Company, in integrating the design of his adjacent building, Park Place Office Building into her design for the park. She also worked in collaboration with an architect, landscape architect, engineers, and real estate developers on the work. For Rock Rings, Holt searched far and wide to find the right masons to work on the piece and also had local stone called schist, which was 250-million-years old, quarried by hand for the work. Despite all of the collaboration, Holt noted that she was always present for the construction of her artworks. in June 2012, she completed Avignon Locators, her first site-specific work made in France on the basis of the Missoula Ranch Locators: Vision Encompassed (1972). This work involved a team of academics, teachers and students, an astrophysist, a surveyor, a metalworker and an architect.

== Analysis of major works ==
=== Sun Tunnels ===
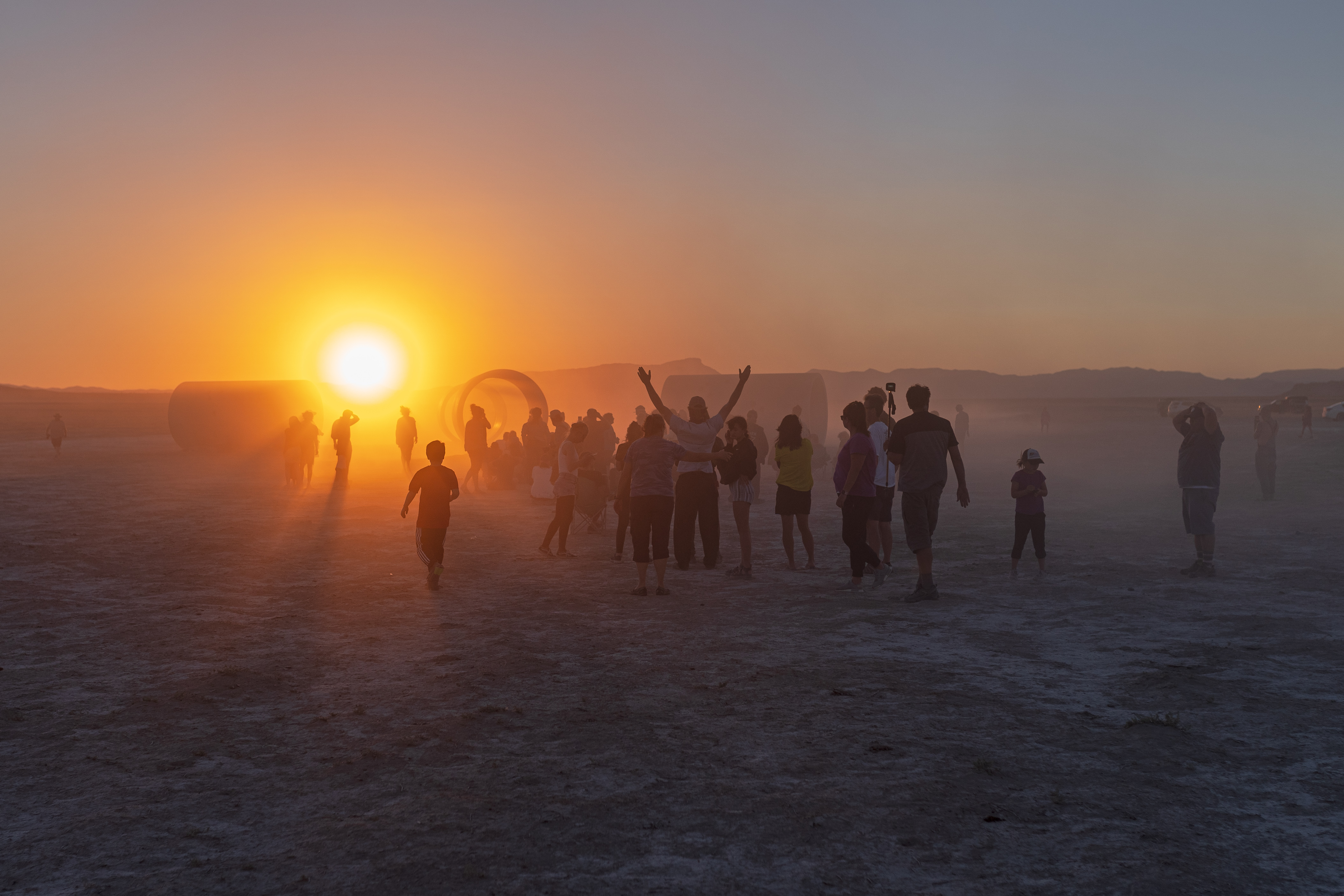
A small crowd views the summer solstice sunset on June 20th, 2021 at the Sun Tunnels.

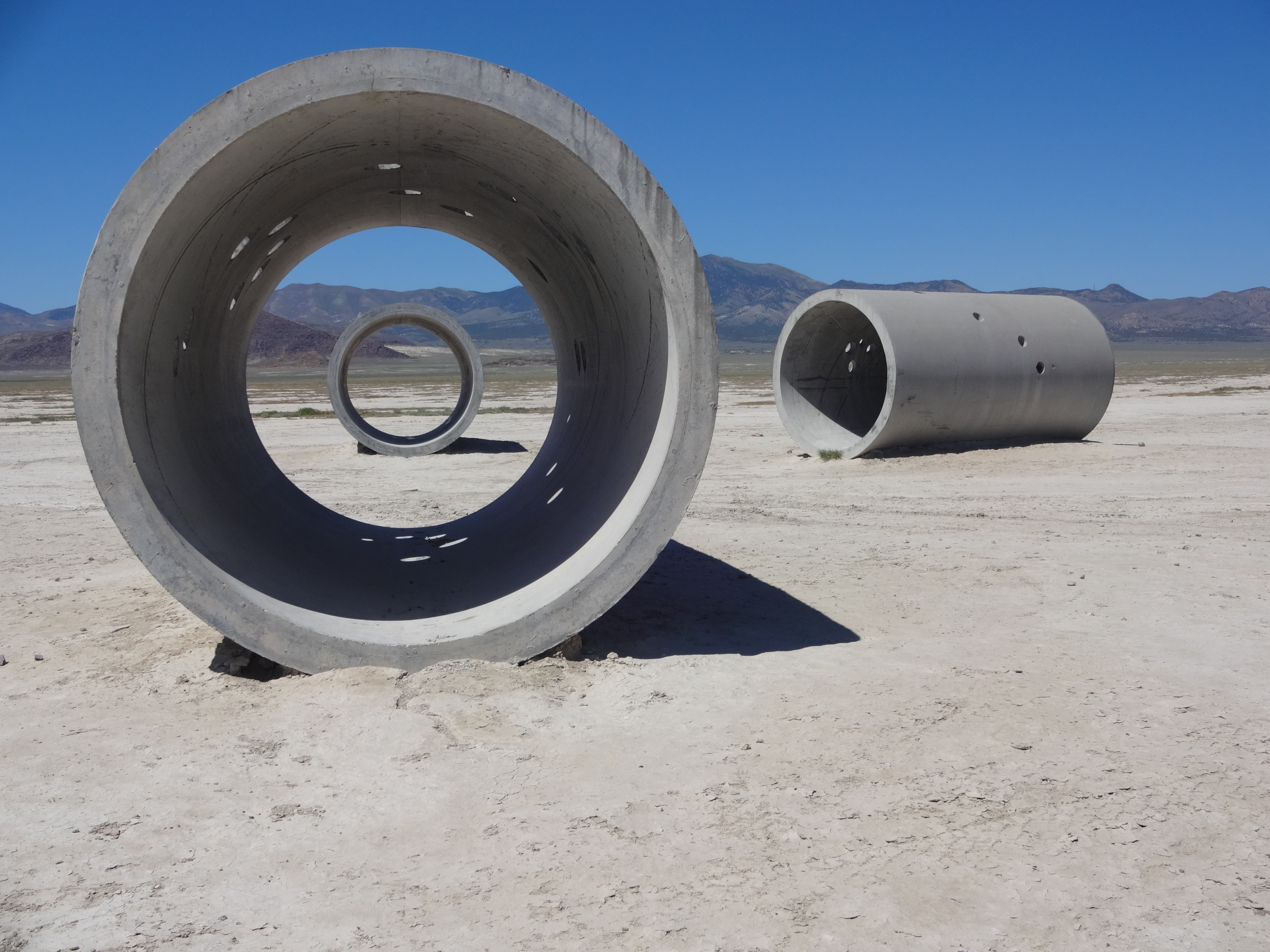
Sun Tunnels in June 2015.

Sun Tunnels is located in the Great Basin Desert outside of the ghost town of Lucin, Utah, at 41.303501°N 113.863831°W. The work is a product of Holt's interest in the great variation of intensity of the sun in the desert compared to the sun in the city. Holt searched for and found a site which was remote and empty.

"It is a very desolate area, but it is totally accessible, and it can be easily visited, making Sun Tunnels more accessible really than art in museums ... A work like Sun Tunnels is always accessible ... Eventually, as many people will see Sun Tunnels as would see many works in a city - in a museum anyway."

The work consists of four large scale concrete tunnels (18 feet or 5.5 metres long and 9 feet or 2.7 metres in diameter), which are arranged in an “X” configuration to total a length of 86 feet (26 m). Each tunnel is aligned with, variously, the sunrise or sunset, of the summer or winter solstice. Someone visiting the site would see the tunnels immediately with their contrast to the fairly undifferentiated desert landscape. Approaching the work, which can be seen up to 1.5 miles (2.4 km) away, the viewer's perception of space is questioned as the tunnels change views as a product of their landscape.

The tunnels not only provide a much-needed shelter from the sweltering desert sun, but once inside the effect of the play of light within the tunnels can be seen. The top of each tunnel has small holes, forming on each, the constellations of Draco, Perseus, Columba, and Capricorn, respectively. The diameters of the holes differ in relation to the magnitude of the stars represented. These holes cast spots of daylight in the dark interiors of the tunnels, which appear almost like stars. Holt said of the tunnels, "It’s an inversion of the sky/ground relationship-bringing the sky down to the earth." This is a common theme in Holt's work. She sometimes created this relationship with reflecting pools and shadow patterns marked on the ground, like in her work Star Crossed.

Dia Art Foundation acquired the work in March 2018. It is the first land art installation by a woman in Dia's collection. It is now considered one of Dia's 12 locations and sites they manage.

=== Dark Star Park ===
Dark Star Park was commissioned by Arlington County, Virginia, in 1979, in conjunction with an urban-renewal project. Construction of the work began in 1984. Holt worked with an architect, landscape architect, engineers and real estate developers on the project. The artwork is at once a park and a sculpture. Built on 2/3 acre (29,000 sq ft; 2,700 m^{2}) of land where a run-down, old gas station and warehouse once stood, Holt transformed the space. The park consists of five spheres, two pools, four steel poles, a stairway, a large tunnel for passage, a smaller tunnel for viewing only and plantings of crown vetch, winter creeper, willow oak, and earth and grass.

The forms stand in stark contrast to the busy and highly developed commercial area that surrounds the space. There are places to walk and sit within the park, giving a passersby a chance to escape from the urban environment. Dark Star Park is more socially interactive than Holt's other works. Holt paid attention to how people both inside and outside the park would see the spheres. The work alters the viewer's perception by using curvilinear forms, such as the walkways that mimic the curving roads surrounding the site. Walking in the park or driving by it, viewers may mistake spheres of different sizes to actually be the same size or one sphere may eclipse another. The tunneled passages into the park frame certain sculptural elements, as do the reflections in the pools. However, Holt made sure not to alienate the park entirely from its surroundings. The spheres are made of gunite (a sprayable mixture of cement and sand), asphalt, precast concrete tunnels, steel poles and stone masonry. These materials relate the park to the buildings located near the artwork.

The work explores the concept of time and our relationship to the universe. When approaching one of the spheres, a visitor to the park might be reminded of the lunar surface or when glancing at the quiet pools of water around the spheres, may relate them to craters. This is no coincidence. Holt held a fascination with solar eclipses, as well as in the shadows cast by the sun on the surface of the earth and the name of the park is a reference to the astronomical appearance of the large spheres that are its most distinct features. In speaking about the name Holt said, "It’s called Dark Star Park because in my imagination these spheres are like stars that have fallen to the ground-they no longer shine-so I think of the park/artwork in a somewhat celestial way." By engaging the viewer with these spheres and the other elements surrounding them in the park, Holt brought the vast scale of nature and the cosmos back to human scale. Time is also a major part of this work. Once a year on August 1 at 9:32 a.m., the shadows cast by two of the spheres and their four adjacent poles align with permanent asphalt shadow patterns outlined on the ground. This date was selected by the artist to commemorate the day in 1860 when William Ross bought the land that today is Rosslyn, Virginia, where the park is situated.

Holt took on the challenging task of playing many roles in the park's creation, becoming at once an artist, landscape designer and committee member for approving plans for a nearby building. To take on all three roles possibly had never been done before by an artist, thus the park and its designer remain important to the history of art.

"I was the landscape designer as well as the sculptor, so the whole park became a work of art. And I was on the committee to approve the architectural design of the building adjacent to the park. I don’t think either of these situations ever happened before for an artist, so that was unusual, and it broke new ground for public art."

The work was surveyed in June 1995. At that time “treatment was needed.”. Thus, seven years later, when the park was finally restored in 2002 it was long overdue.

=== Polar Circle and Star-Crossed ===
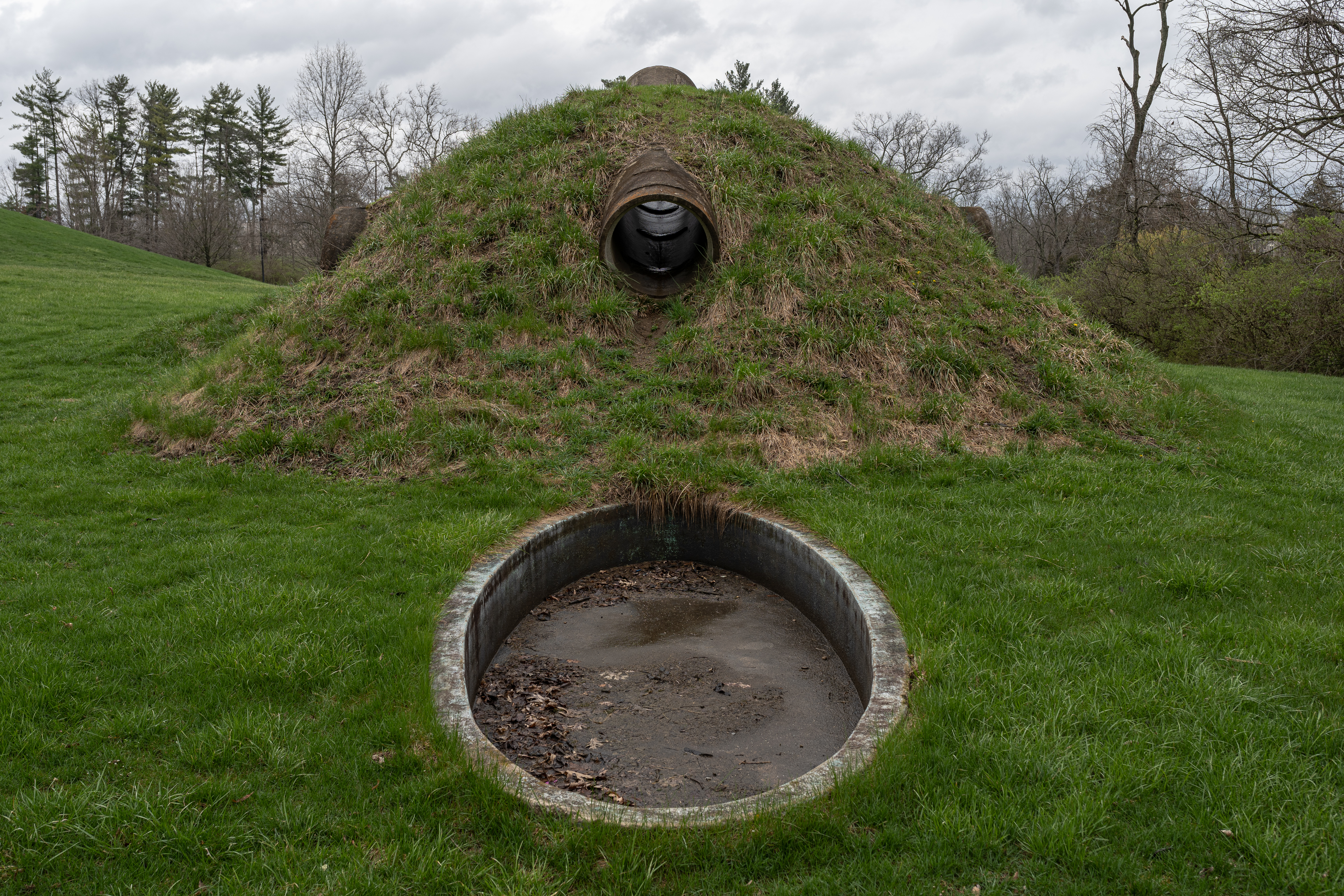
The reflecting pool and observation tunnel of Star-Crossed. The tunnel for walking runs horizontally through the mound from this vantage.

In 1979, Nancy Holt was commissioned to do two works on the grounds of Miami University in Ohio, the temporary work Polar Circle and the permanent sculpture Star-Crossed.

=== Solar Web ===
Holt's Solar Web (1984–89) was one of three projects chosen by the Arts Commission of Santa Monica, California, after receiving proposals from 29 artists in 1984. The works were to form a new Natural Elements Sculpture Park scattered along the southern half of Santa Monica's beach. Called Solar Web, the work would have stood up to 16 feet tall and been 72 feet long. It was a web-like network of black steel pipes pointed toward the ocean, designed to align with the sun and the planets in such a way that it marked the summer and winter solstices. The project was later abandoned after protests from oceanfront homeowners who complain the artwork will ruin their scenic views.

=== Flow Ace Heating ===
A functioning hot water system, Holt's Flow Ace Heating (1985) begins with a pipe that cuts through a gallery wall near the ceiling and grows into a complex configuration of linear form, punctuated by radiators, valve wheels, gauges and other instruments. The pipes (all warm to the touch) wrap around walls and extend into their rooms' centers where they blossom into large rectangles and loops.

=== Sky Mound ===
Located in Northern New Jersey, Sky Mound sits where a 57-acre (2,500,000 sq ft; 230,000 m^{2}), 100-foot-high (30 m) landfill once stood. The state's Hackensack Meadowland Development Commission (HMDC) asked Holt to reclaim the site in an effort to provide an environmentally safe spot for plant and animal life to reside and for humans to enjoy.

Still unfinished in April 2008, the landfill is to be turned into an earth sculpture and public park. The landfill has been covered with grass. Ten mounds stand upon the site, as well as steel poles, plants, and a pond, designed for the approximately 250 species of migratory birds that visit the area seasonally. There will eventually be wind indicators and gravel paths. On several astronomically significant dates each year, the work will provide its viewer with unique views of the sun, moon and several stars.

In addition, a series of arcing pipes will go down into the landfill, recovering methane from the 10 million tons of garbage below. This will provide an alternative source of energy for those in the community.

The yet to be completed Sky Mound’s location makes it visible and accessible to many people. Holt believed the work would increase awareness of the complex problem of how we dispose of our waste and trash. The unfinished work also raises questions about the sun, as every ecosystem depends on the sun and its energy for survival. In 1991, funding on Sky Mound was stopped to perform a technological study at the site; currently construction remains postponed.

From the Holt/Smithson Foundation web page, and Art in America (2024):

[Holt] planned to incorporate gravel paths in alignment with the solstices, a large gunite sphere encircled by a moat to represent the moon, methane flares visible from planes overhead, and a pond that would attract wildlife and drain surface water from the landfill. This pond is the only realized portion of Holt’s design—the rest is delayed indefinitely.

Mound can be glimpsed from the New Jersey Turnpike—the mound is now a solar farm, which at least aligns with Holt’s desire to model sustainability and closer connections to the cosmos.

== Films ==
Holt made a number of films and videos since the late 1960s, including Mono Lake (1968), East Coast, West Coast (1969), Swamp (1971) (in collaboration with Robert Smithson) and Breaking ground: Broken Circle/Spiral Hill, a video "guided by Smithson's film notes and drawings" and completed forty years on. Points of View: Clocktower (1974) features conversations between Lucy Lippard and Richard Serra, Liza Bear and Klaus Kertess, Carl Andre and Ruth Kligman and Bruce Brice and Tina Girouard. In 1978, she produced a 16mm color film documenting the seminal work Sun Tunnels.

=== Underscan (1974) - Videotape ===
Holt made Underscan in 1974 using still images of her aunt Ethel's home in New Bedford, Massachusetts, and an underscanning device to tell a story of aging and the passage of time. The images are manipulated through a process of videotaping, and then re-videotaping the monitor of the underscanning monitor screen, which distorts, elongates, and compresses the images. The video begins by zooming in on a blank monitor until the images appear to encompass the entirety of the screen. A voice-over of Holt reading letters received from her aunt between 1962 and 1972 accompanies the images. Along with the images, the letters themselves have been edited by Holt to include and exclude pieces of information which contribute to a theme of deterioration present in the video and the voice-over. The letters from Ethel Holt-Tate to her niece discuss Ethel's experience of maintaining her home, her health over the years, and the health of her roommates. The entirety of the voice-over is completed with Holt reading in a deadpan tone and metronome rhythm, which normalizes life and death as equivalent human experiences. The tone of the voice-over, combined with the mechanical scrolling of the underscanning monitor, distances the viewer and is in high contrast with the intimate content of the letters. Underscan challenges the idea that elderly women need to be cared for or are unproductive—the letters from Ethel detail how she is productive in her care for her home, both inside and out and is responsible for her own health. Underscan draws attention to the experiences of aging, the fragility of memory, and the connections we build by caring for each other. Importantly, Holt’s narration partitions the viewer’s relationship with her aunt Ethel. Presumably, upon receiving the letters, Holt’s internal dialogue is mediated through Ethel’s voice, through their personal interactions. On the other hand, the viewer cannot and would not recognize the voice of aunt Ethel— that relationship is kept private within Holt’s family. Underscan invites viewers into a series of intimate conversations, yet inherently keeps full intimacy at bay. In this way, Underscan’s dual nature lends it to quick, familiar connection—where viewer’s relate to the experience of aging—and disjunction, grasping at a relationship one can never be privy to.

== Selected artworks ==
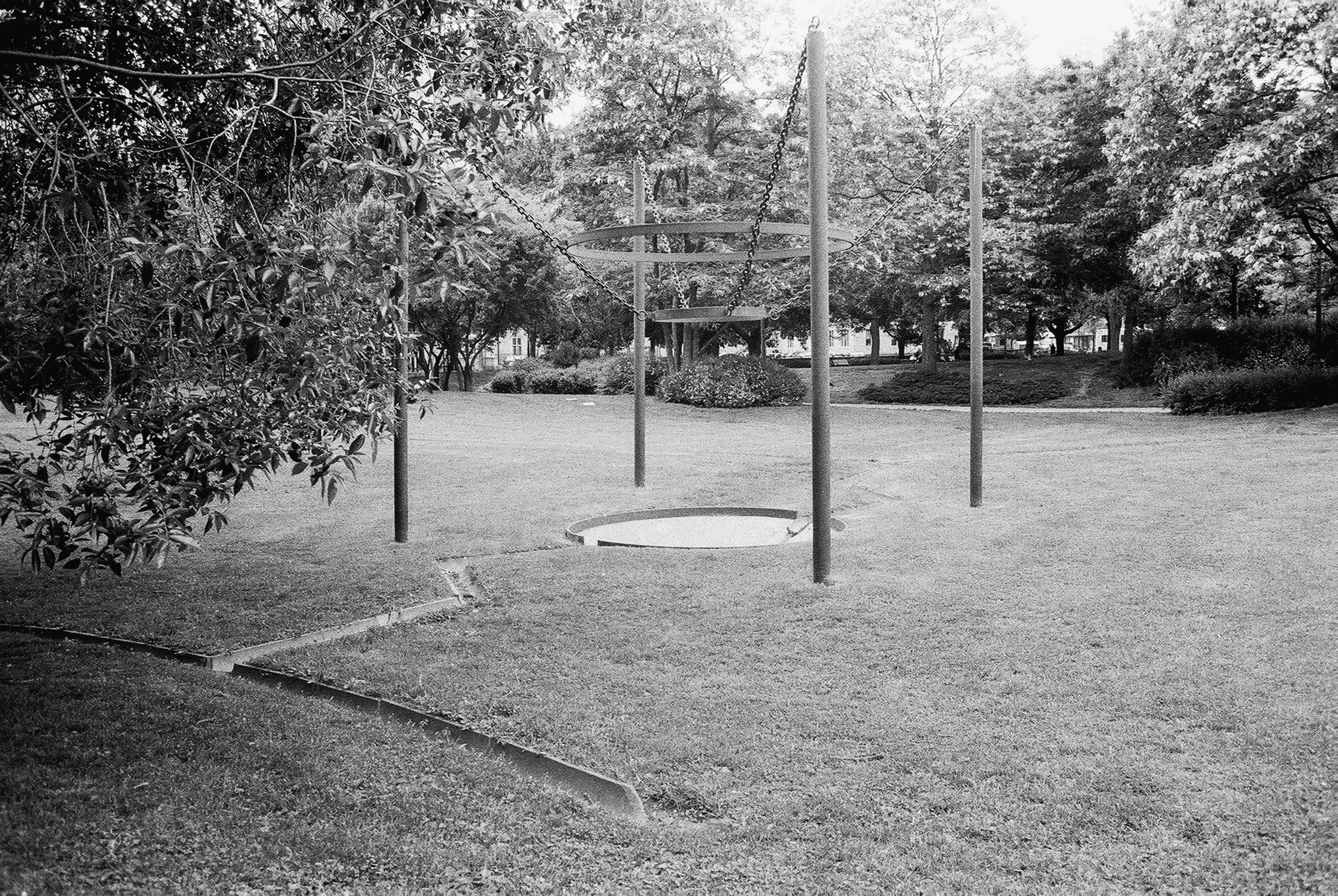
Catch Basin in Toronto, Ontario

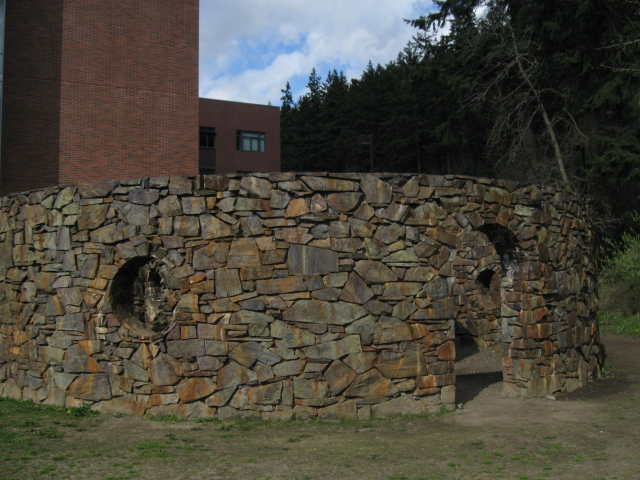
Rock Rings in Bellingham, Washington.

- Missoula Ranch Locators: Vision Encompassed (1972, dismantled), Missoula, Montana
- Sun Tunnels (1973–1976), Great Basin Desert, Utah
- Hydra’s Head (1974), Artpark, Lewiston, New York
- Stone Enclosure: Rock Rings (1977–78), Western Washington University Public Sculpture Collection, Bellingham, Washington
- Rock Rings (1977–1978), Western Washington University, Bellingham, Washington
- 30 Below (1979), Lake Placid, New York
- Wild Spot (1979–1980), Wellesley College Botanic Gardens, Wellesley, Massachusetts
- Star-Crossed (1979–1981), Miami University, Oxford, Ohio
- Dark Star Park (1979–1984), Rosslyn, Virginia
- Annual Ring (1980–1981), Saginaw Valley State University, University Center, Michigan
- Time Span (1981), Laguna Gloria Art Museum, Austin, Texas
- Catch Basin (1982), St. James Park, Toronto, Canada
- Electrical System II (1982), Bellman Circuit, Toronto, Canada
- Sole Source (1983), Dublin, Ireland
- End of the Line/West Rock (1985), Southern Connecticut State University, New Haven, Connecticut
- Astral Grating (1987), Fulton Street/Broadway-Nassau Subway Station, New York. Commissioned by Metropolitan Transportation Authority Arts for Transit
- Skymound (1988–present), Hackensack, New Jersey
- Ventilation IV: Hampton Air (1992), Guild Hall, East Hampton, New York
- Solar Rotary (1995), University of South Florida, Tampa, Florida
- Up and Under (1998), Municipality of Hämeenkyrö, Finland
- Avignon Locators (2012), Sainte-Marthe Campus, Avignon, France (official sculpture and event Website)

== Exhibitions ==
The first retrospective of her work, “Nancy Holt: Sightlines,” opened in 2010 at the Miriam and Ira D. Wallach Art Gallery at Columbia University and traveled to several other venues in the United States and Europe.

Some of her work was included in the Light and Language exhibition at Lisemore Castle Arts, Ireland in 2021. In 2022 the major survey Nancy Holt / Inside Outside launched at Bildmuseet, Umea University, Sweden, traveling to MACBA, Spain in 2023 with two accompanying publications in English and Spanish.

=== Selected solo exhibitions ===
- 1972 Art Gallery, University of Montana, Missoula Montana
- 1972 Art Center, University of Rhode Island, Kingston
- 1977 "Young American Filmmakers’ Series," Whitney Museum of American Art, New York, New York
- 1979 Rock Rings at Western Washington University
- 1985 Ace Gallery, Los Angeles, California
- 1989 Montpellier Cultural Arts Center, Laurel, Maryland
- 1993 John Weber Gallery, New York, New York
- 2010-13 "Nancy Holt: Sightlines" (international traveling exhibition), Miriam and Ira D. Wallach Gallery, New York, New York; Badischer Kunstverein, Karlsruhe, Germany; Graham Foundation for Advanced Studies in the Fine Arts, Chicago, Illinois; Tufts University, Medford, Massachusetts (e-press release); Santa Fe Art Institute (SFAI), Santa Fe, New Mexico; Utah Museum of Fine Arts, Salt Lake City, Utah
- 2012 "Nancy Holt: Photoworks," Haunch of Venison, London, United Kingdom
- 2013 "Nancy Holt: Land Art," Whitworth Art Gallery, University of Manchester, United Kingdom
- 2013 "Nancy Holt & Robert Smithson: England and Wales 1969," John Hansard Gallery, University of Southampton, United Kingdom
- 2013 "Nancy Holt – Selected Photo and Film Works," Contemporary Art Gallery, Vancouver, Canada
- 2023 "Nancy Holt / Inside Outside", MACBA, Barcelona, Spain.
- 2024 Tate Liverpool

=== Selected group exhibitions ===
- 1969 “Language III,” Dwan Gallery, New York, New York
- 1972 “International Art Exhibition,” Pamplona, Spain
- 1974 “Intervention in the Landscape,” Hayden Gallery, Massachusetts Institute of Technology, Cambridge
- 1977 Whitney Biennial, Whitney Museum of American Art, New York, New York
- 1981 “Summer Light,” Museum of Modern Art, New York, New York
- 1983 “Monuments and Landscapes: The New Public Art,” McIntosh/Drysdale Gallery, Houston, Texas
- 1985 “Artist as Social Designer,” Los Angeles County Museum of Art, California
- 1989 “Making Their Mark,” Cincinnati Art Museum, Cincinnati, Ohio; New Orleans Museum of Art, New Orleans, Louisiana; Denver Art Museum, Denver Colorado; Pennsylvania Academy of the Fine Arts, Philadelphia, Pennsylvania
- 1998 Wiener Kunstverein, Vienna, Austria
- 1999 “After Image: Drawing Through Process,” Museum of Contemporary Art, Los Angeles, California
- 2007 "Cosmologies," James Cohan Gallery, New York, New York
- 2012-13 "Ends of the Earth — Land Art to 1974," Museum of Contemporary Art, Los Angeles, California and Haus der Kunst, Munich
- 2013 "Light Show," Hayward Gallery, London, United Kingdom
- 2013 "The Whole Earth. California and the Disappearance of the Outside," Haus der Kulturen der Welt, Berlin, Germany

== Legacy ==
In 2014, the Holt/Smithson Foundation was founded to continue the creative and investigative spirit of the artists Nancy Holt and Robert Smithson, who, over their careers, developed innovative methods of exploring our relationship with the planet, and expanded the limits of artistic practice. Through public service, the Foundation engages in programs that increase awareness of both artists’ creative legacies, continuing the transformation they brought to the world of art and ideas.

Since 2021, Holt's estate has been represented by Sprüth Magers and Parafin.
