= Laguna Gloria =

Historic house in Austin, Texas, United States

- The Contemporary Austin - Laguna Gloria
- U.S. National Register of Historic Places
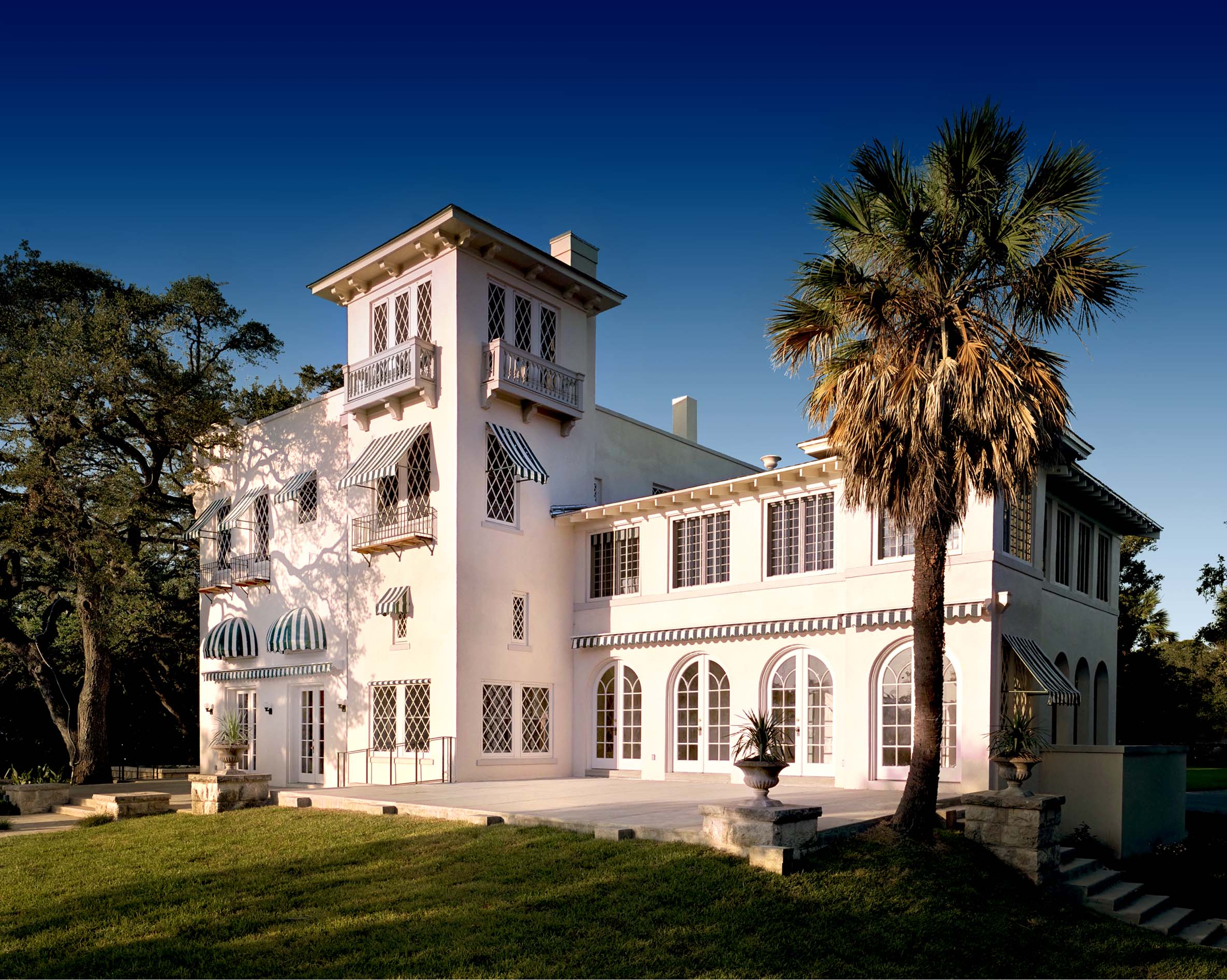

- Location within Texas
- Interactive map showing the location of Laguna Gloria
- Location: 3809 W. 35th St; Austin, Texas, USA
- Coordinates: 30°18′44″N 97°46′27″W
- Built: 1916
- Architect: Jack Johnson
- NRHP reference No.: 75002005
- Added to NRHP: December 6, 1975

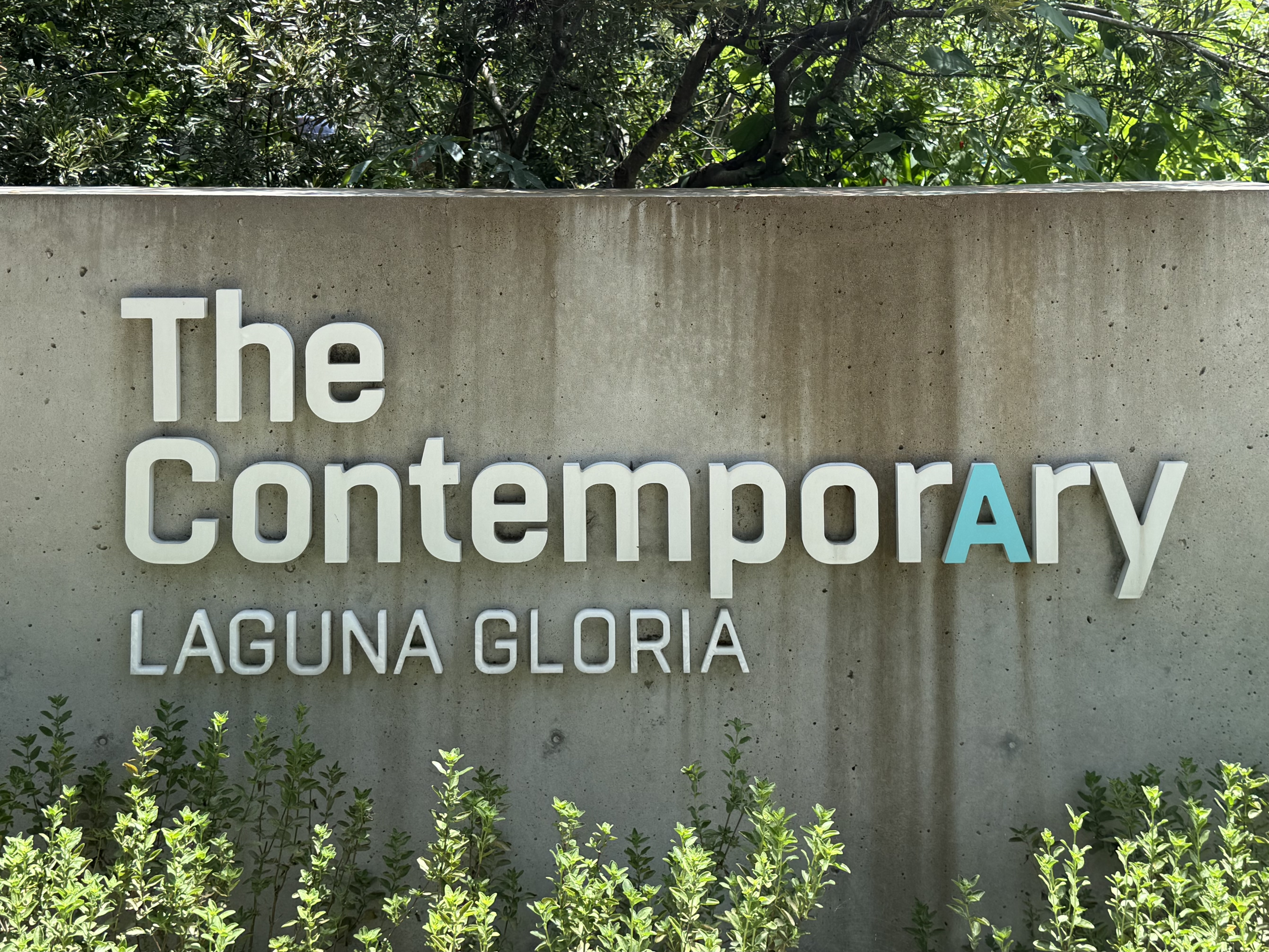

The Contemporary Austin - Laguna Gloria, formerly known as the AMOA-Arthouse at Laguna Gloria, is one of two sites of The Contemporary Austin. Once owned by Stephen F. Austin, the Laguna Gloria site is on state and national registers of historic places. The site consists of 14-acres on Lake Austin, including the restored 1916 Italianate-style Driscoll Villa that was the home of Clara Driscoll, the Gatehouse Gallery, and the extensive Betty and Edward Marcus Sculpture Park.

== History ==
Before the influx of white settlers, Native Americans visited the site for its nearby spring (today underwater). The land that includes the property was originally owned by Stephen F. Austin, who in 1832 (seven years before Austin was founded) wrote that he wished to build a home there. This never came to pass.

In 1914 the property was purchased by Hal Sevier, editor of the Austin American, with his new wife Clara Driscoll. They completed their villa two years later, inspired by a honeymoon visit to Lake Como in Italy. Clara, an avid gardener, spent many years planting native and foreign plants around the site and designing the terraced gardens that remain to this day. In 1943 Driscoll donated the homesite to be used as a city museum.

In 1961, the site was converted to the Laguna Gloria Art Museum and became an important part of the Austin arts scene. Soon after, the museum began offering art classes, and in 1983, a 5,300-square-foot (490 m^{2}) facility was built specifically for the growing art school.

In 1992, the institution changed its name to the Austin Museum of Art, and four years later, moved its primary exhibition space to 823 Congress Avenue, in the heart of downtown Austin. Laguna Gloria remained the site of The Art School, and in 2003, the Driscoll Villa was renovated and again became an exhibition space, focusing on local and regional artists.

The site is immediately adjacent to Mayfield Park, also on the National Register of Historic Places.

== Texas Historical Commission marker text ==
"This Mediterranean style villa was built in 1916 for Henry H. and Clara Driscoll Sevier. Named Laguna Gloria for a nearby lagoon off the Colorado River, the stuccoed home features a decorative window at San Jose Mission in San Antonio. In 1943 the site was conveyed to the Texas Fine Arts Assoc. by Clara Driscoll, best known for her efforts to preserve the Alamo. Her homesite is now owned by Laguna Gloria Art Museum." Recorded Texas Historic Landmark - 1983
