= Mayfield–Gutsch Estate =

Historic house in Texas, United States

- U.S. National Register of Historic Places
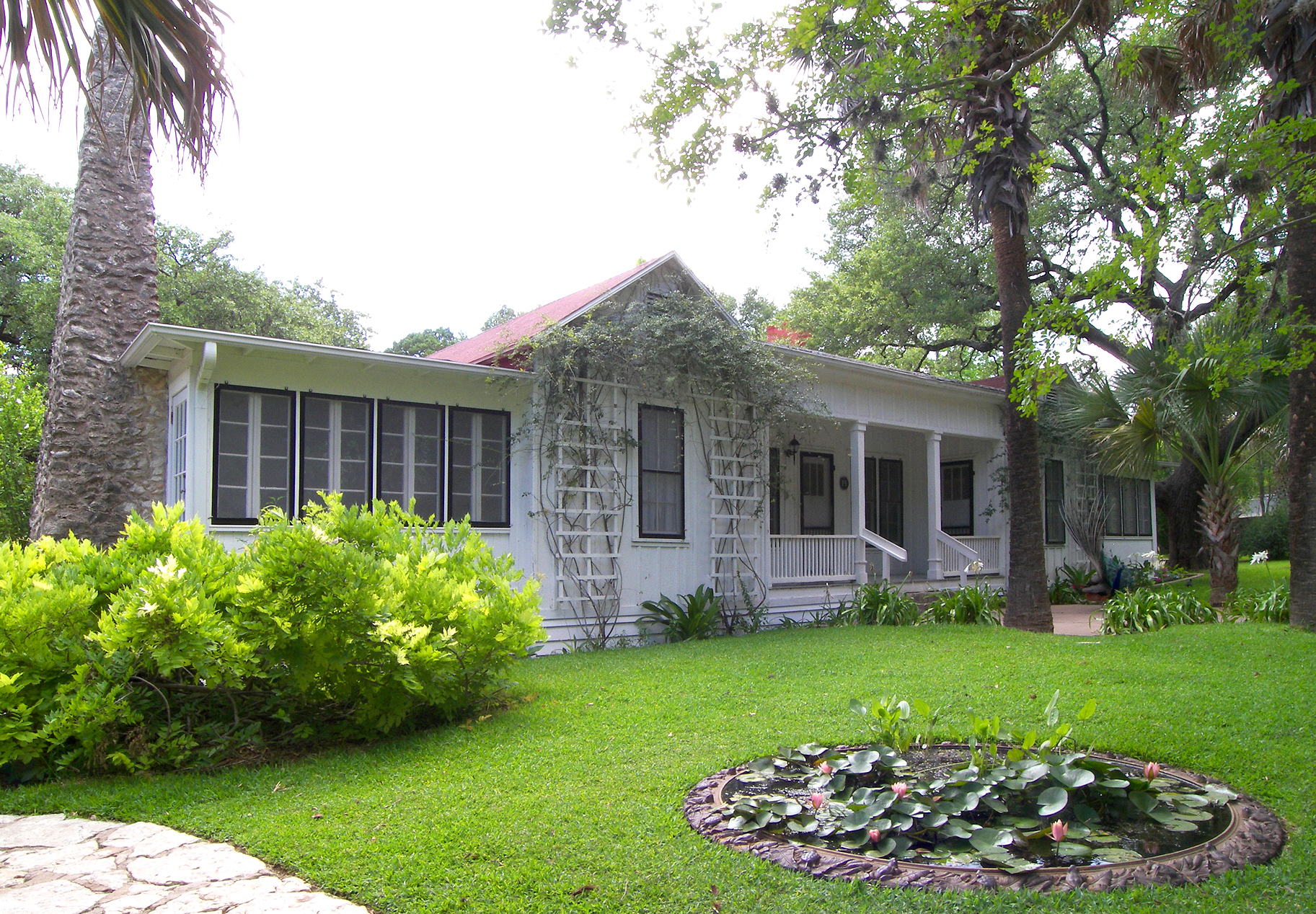

- Location within Texas Location within the United States
- Location: 3505 W 35th St, Austin, Texas
- Coordinates: 30°18′46″N 97°46′14″W
- Area: 23.3 acres (9.4 ha)
- Built: 1922
- NRHP reference No.: 94001159
- Added to NRHP: September 29, 1994

The Mayfield–Gutsch Estate, now named Mayfield Park, is a historic cottage, gardens and nature preserve in west Austin, Texas on a bluff overlooking Lake Austin. Originally built in the 1870s, the cottage was purchased by former Texas Secretary of State Allison Mayfield in 1909. In 1922, the house passed to Mayfield's daughter, Mary Frances, and her husband, University of Texas professor Milton Gutsch. They expanded the home, adding porches on three sides and, with the help of gardener Esteban Arredondo, greatly developed 2 acres (0.81 ha) of the property around their home into a botanical garden surrounded by a rock perimeter wall. When Mary Mayfield Gutsch died in 1971, the home and grounds were left to the City of Austin for use as a park. The property was listed on the National Register of Historic Places on September 29, 1994.

Mayfield Park is open to the public and is known for its free roaming peacocks on the property. The free-roaming peafowl at Mayfield have been a feature of the property since a pair was given to the Gutsch family in 1935. The cottage and gardens can be reserved for private events. The grounds are immediately adjacent to Laguna Gloria, home to the Austin Museum of Art.
