= Robert Smithson =

20th-century American artist

- Smithson at an unknown date
- Born: Robert Irving Smithson; January 2, 1938; Passaic, New Jersey, U.S.
- Died: July 20, 1973 (aged 35); Near Amarillo, Texas
- Education: Art Students League of New York
- Known for: Sculpture, Earthworks
- Notable work: Spiral Jetty, 1970
- Movement: Land art
- Spouse: Nancy Holt
- Patrons: Virginia Dwan

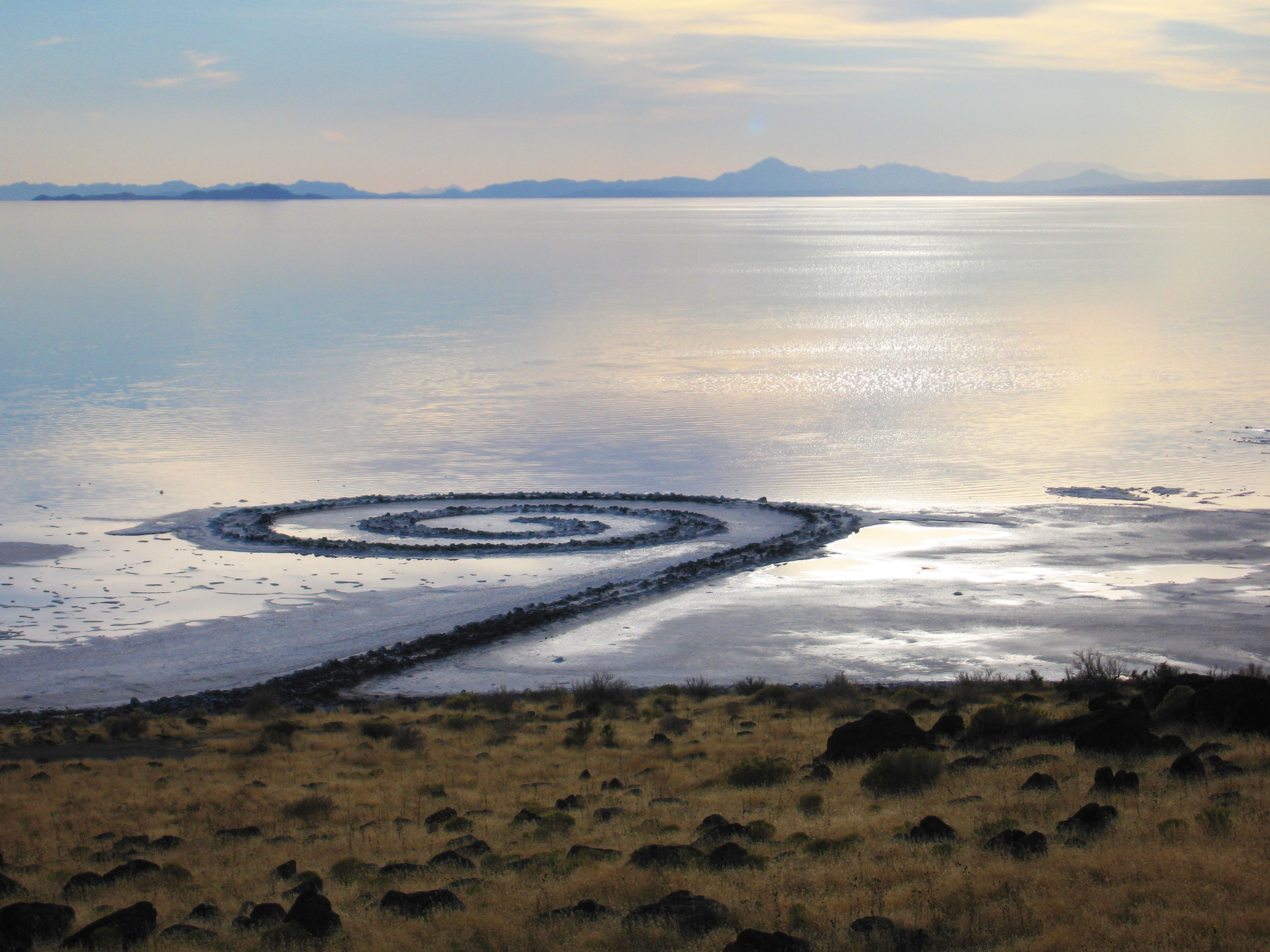
Robert Smithson, Spiral Jetty in 2004, Rozel Point, Great Salt Lake, Utah.

Robert Smithson (January 2, 1938 – July 20, 1973) was an American artist known for sculpture and land art who often used drawing and photography in relation to the spatial arts. His work has been internationally exhibited in galleries and museums and is held in public collections. He was one of the founders of the land art movement whose best known work is the Spiral Jetty (1970).

== Early life and education ==
Smithson was born in Passaic, New Jersey, and spent his childhood in Rutherford until he was nine. In Rutherford, the poet and physician William Carlos Williams was Smithson's pediatrician. When Smithson was nine, his family moved to the Allwood section of Clifton. He studied painting and drawing in New York City at the Art Students League of New York from 1954 to 1956 and then briefly at the Brooklyn Museum Art School.

== Career ==
=== Early work ===
He primarily identified as a painter during this time, and his early exhibited artworks had a wide range of influences, including science fiction, Catholic art and Pop art. He produced drawings and collage works that incorporated images from natural history, science fiction films, classical art, religious iconography, and pornography including "homoerotic clippings from beefcake magazines". Paintings from 1959 to 1962 explored "mythical religious archetypes" and were also based on Dante's Divine Comedy such as the paintings from 1959 Wall of Dis and The Inferno, Purgatory and Paradise, that correspond to the Divine Comedy's three-part structure.

After a break from the art world, Smithson reemerged in 1964 as a proponent of the minimalist movement. His new work abandoned the preoccupation with the body that had been common in his earlier work, and he began to use glass sheet and neon lighting tubes to explore visual refraction and mirroring. His wall-mounted sculpture Enantiomorphic Chambers was made of steel and mirrors and created the optical effect of a "pointless vanishing-point". Crystalline structures and the concept of entropy became of interest to him and informed a number of sculptures completed during this period, including Alogon 2, (1966) composed of ten units, the title of which refers to the Greek word for an unnamable, irrational number. Smithson's interest in entropy led him to write about a future in which "the universe will burn out into an all-encompassing sameness". His ideas on entropy also addressed culture, "the urban sprawl and the infinite number of housing developments of the post war boom have contributed to the architect of entropy". He called these urban/suburban sprawls "slurbs." Smithson viewed entropy as a form of transformation of society and culture, which is shown in his artwork, for example, the non-site pieces. Smithson became affiliated with artists who were identified with the minimalist or Primary Structures movement, such as Nancy Holt (whom he married), Robert Morris and Sol LeWitt.

=== Later work ===
==== Non-sites ====
In 1967 Smithson began exploring industrial areas around New Jersey and was fascinated by the sight of dump trucks excavating tons of earth and rock that he described in an essay as the equivalents of the monuments of antiquity. This resulted in the series of 'non-sites' in which earth and rocks collected from a specific area are installed in the gallery as sculptures, often combined with mirrors or glass. Works from this period include Eight-Part Piece (Cayuga Salt Mine Project) (1969) and Map of Broken Clear Glass (Atlantis) (1969). In 1968, he visited the American West for the first time with Nancy Holt and Michael Heizer to Virginia City, Nevada and Lone Pine, California. In September 1968, Smithson published the essay "A Sedimentation of the Mind: Earth Projects" in Artforum that promoted the work of the first wave of land art artists, and in 1969 he began producing land art pieces to further explore concepts gained from his readings of William S. Burroughs, J. G. Ballard, and George Kubler. The journeys he undertook were central to his practice as an artist, and his non-site sculptures often included maps and aerial photos of a particular location, as well as the geological artifacts displaced from those sites. Of these travels, several on-site works were produced, including Mirror Displacements, a series of photographs that illustrated his essay "Incidents of Mirror Travels in the Yucatan" (1969).

==== Writings ====
Smithson produced theoretical and critical writing in addition to visual art. In addition to essays his writings included visual-text formats such as the 2D paper work A Heap of Language, which sought to show how writing might become an artwork. In his essay Incidents of Mirror-Travel in the Yucatan Smithson documents a series of temporary sculptures made with mirrors at particular locations around the Yucatan Peninsula. Part travelogue, part critical rumination, the article highlights Smithson's concern with the temporal as a cornerstone of his work.

Other theoretical writings explore the relationship of a piece of art to its environment, from which he developed his concept of sites and non-sites. A site was a work located in a specific outdoor location, while a non-site was a work which could be displayed in any suitable space, such as an art gallery. Spiral Jetty is an example of a sited work, while Smithson's non-site pieces frequently consist of photographs of a particular location, often exhibited alongside some material (such as stones or soil) removed from that location.

As a writer, Smithson was interested in applying the Dialectical method and mathematical impersonality to art that he outlined in essays and reviews for Arts Magazine and Artforum and for a period was better known as a critic than as an artist. Some of Smithson's later writings recovered 18th- and 19th-century conceptions of landscape architecture which influenced the pivotal earthwork explorations which characterized his later work. He eventually joined the Dwan Gallery, whose owner Virginia Dwan was an enthusiastic supporter of his work. In the late 1960s Smithson's work was published in 0 to 9 magazine, an avant-garde publication which experimented with language and meaning-making.

==== Frederick Law Olmsted's influence ====
Smithson's interest in the temporal is explored in his writings in part through the recovery of the ideas of the picturesque. His essay Frederick Law Olmsted and the Dialectical Landscape was written in 1973 after Smithson had seen an exhibition curated by Elizabeth Barlow Rogers at the Whitney Museum entitled Frederick Law Olmsted's New York as the cultural and temporal context for the creation of his late-19th-century design for Central Park. In examining the photographs of the land set aside to become Central Park, Smithson saw the barren landscape that had been degraded by humans before Olmsted constructed the complex 'naturalistic' landscape that was viscerally apparent to New Yorkers in the 1970s. Smithson was interested in challenging the prevalent conception of Central Park as an outdated 19th-century picturesque aesthetic in landscape architecture that had a static relationship within the continuously evolving urban fabric of New York City. In studying the writings of 18th- and 19th-century picturesque treatise writers Gilpin, Price, Knight and Whately, Smithson recovers issues of site specificity and human intervention as dialectic landscape layers, experiential multiplicity, and the value of deformations manifest in the picturesque landscape. Smithson further implies in this essay that what distinguishes the picturesque is that it is based on real land. For Smithson, a park exists as "a process of ongoing relationships existing in a physical region". Smithson was interested in Central Park as a landscape which by the 1970s had weathered and grown as Olmsted's creation, and was layered with new evidence of human intervention.

Now the Ramble has grown up into an urban jungle, and lurking in its thickets are "hoods, hobos, hustlers, and homosexuals," and other estranged creatures of the city .... Walking east, I passed graffiti on boulders ... On the base of the Obelisk along with the hieroglyphs there are also graffiti. ... In the spillway that pours out of the Wollman Memorial Ice Rink, I noticed a metal grocery cart and a trash basket half-submerged in the water. Further down, the spillway becomes a brook choked with mud and tin cans. The mud then spews under the Gapstow Bridge to become a muddy slough that inundates a good part of The Pond, leaving the rest of The Pond aswirl with oil slicks, sludge, and Dixie cups.

In revisiting the 18th- and early 19th-century treatises of the picturesque, which Olmsted interpreted in his practice, Smithson exposes threads of an anti-aesthetic anti-formalist logic and a theoretical framework of the picturesque that addressed the dialectic between the physical landscape and its temporal context. By re-interpreting and re-valuing these treatises, Smithson was able to broaden the temporal and intellectual context for his own work, and to offer renewed meaning for Central Park as an important work of modern art and landscape architecture.

==== Industrial ruins and disrupted landscapes ====
While Smithson did not find "beauty" in the evidence of abuse and neglect, he did see the state of things as demonstrative of the continually transforming relationships between humans and landscape. He claimed, "the best sites for 'earth art' are sites that have been disrupted by industry, reckless urbanization, or nature's own devastation." Smithson became particularly interested in the notion of industrial decay within the spectrum of anti-aesthetic dynamic relationships which he saw present in the picturesque landscape. In his proposal to make process art out of the dredging of The Pond in Central Park, Smithson sought to insert himself into the dynamic evolution of the park. While in earlier 18th-century formal characterizations of the pastoral and the sublime, something like a "gash in the ground" or pile of rocks, if encountered by a "leveling improver", as described by Price, would have been smoothed over and the area terraformed into a more aesthetically pleasing contour. For Smithson, it was not necessary that the disruption become a visual aspect of a landscape; by his anti-formalist logic, more important was the temporal scar worked over by natural or human intervention. He saw parallels to Olmsted's Central Park as a "sylvan" green overlay on the depleted landscape that preceded his Central Park Defending himself against allegations that he and other earth artists "cut and gouge the land like Army engineers", Smithson, in his own essay, charges that one of such opinions "failed to recognize the possibility of a direct organic manipulation of the land.." and would "turn his back on the contradictions that inhabit our landscapes".

== Significant works ==
=== Spiral Jetty ===
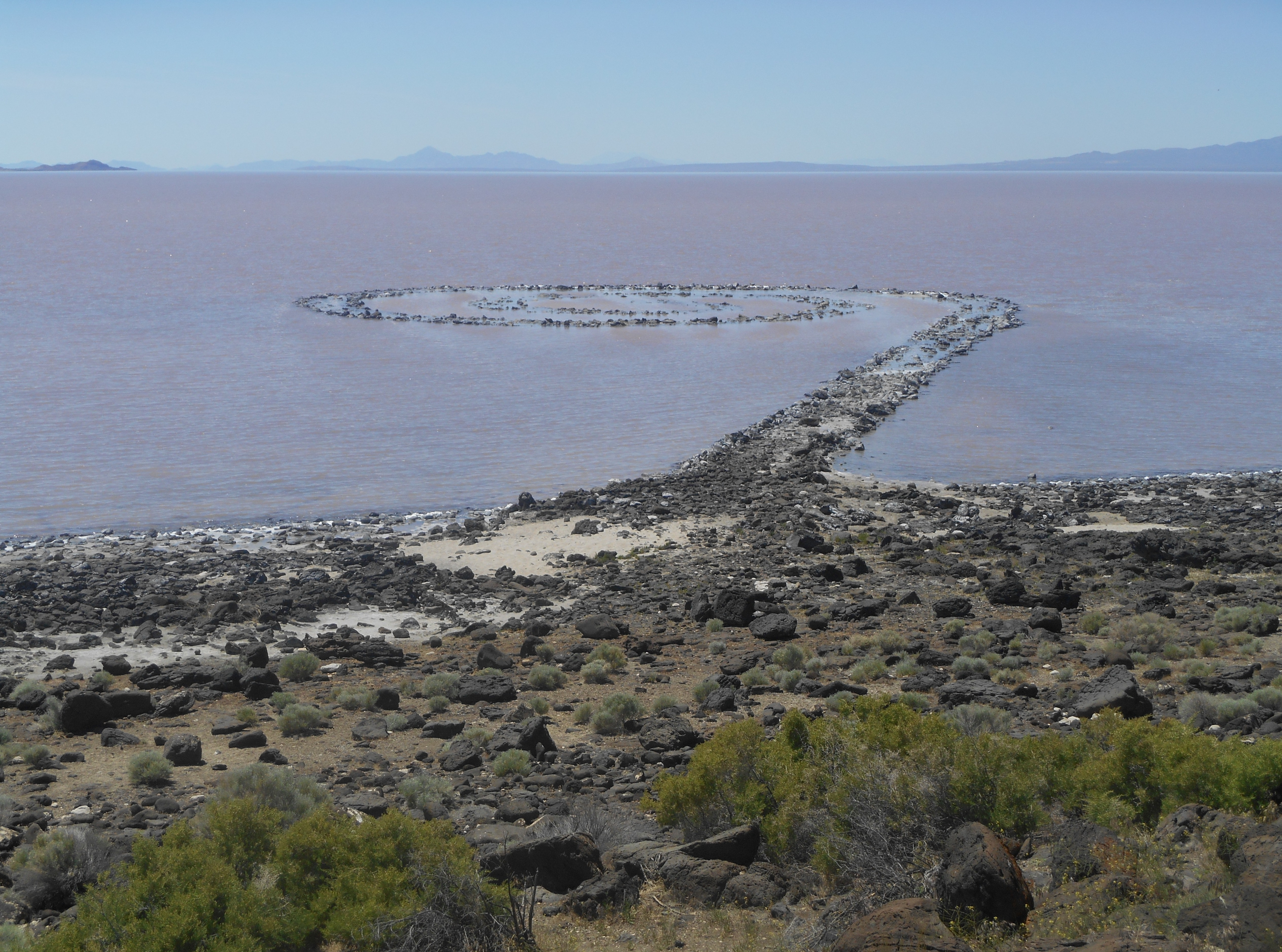
Spiral Jetty in June 2013

Spiral Jetty (1970) is a work of land art in the form of a 1,500-foot-long (460 m), 15-foot-wide (4.6 m) counterclockwise spiral of local basalt rocks and mud, forming a jetty that juts from the shore of the Great Salt Lake near Rozel Point in Utah. Over the years it has accumulated a patina of salt crystals when the level of the lake is low. Some art historians consider the Spiral Jetty to be the most important work by Smithson. He documented the construction of the sculpture in a 32-minute color film also titled Spiral Jetty. Smithson wrote that he deliberately chose the site due to its proximity to a derelict oil jetty. In later years oil and gas extraction has threatened the area.

=== Partially Buried Woodshed ===
Partially Buried Woodshed (1970) is an earthwork created at Kent State University in Kent, Ohio. The work consisted of a derelict woodshed on campus that he covered with earth until the central beam broke, illustrating the concept of entropy. By 2018, only a mound of dirt and the structure's concrete foundation remain. An informational plaque is located in a small wooded area immediately behind the Liquid Crystal Institute building on the Kent State University main campus.

=== Broken Circle/Spiral Hill ===
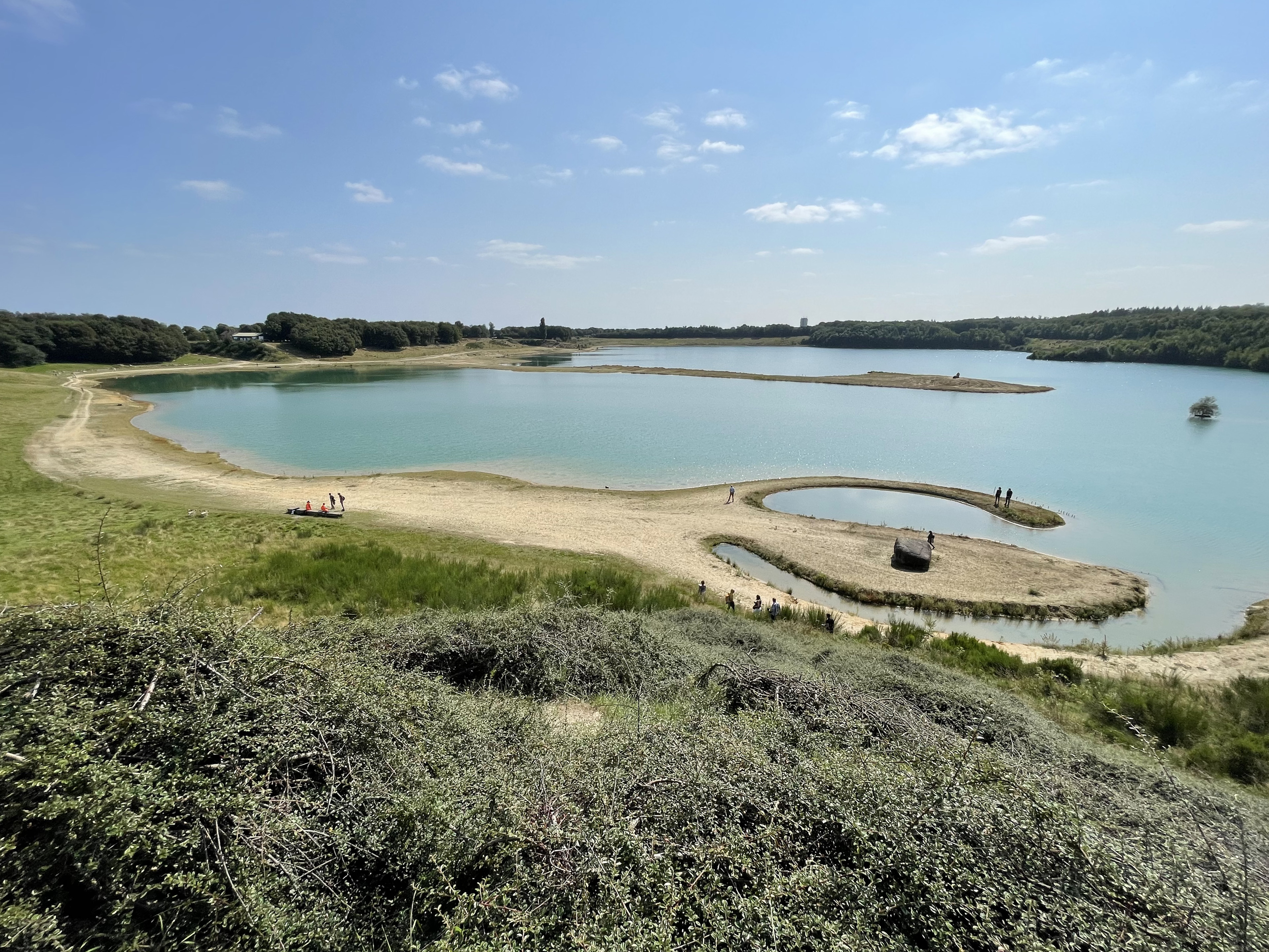
Robert Smithson, Broken Circle/Spiral Hill, Emmen, the Netherlands

In 1971 Smithson created Broken Circle/Spiral Hill in Emmen, the Netherlands as part of the Sonsbeek art festival. The subject of the 1971 Sonsbeek exhibition was Beyond Lawn and Order (Dutch: Buiten de perken). The Broken Circle earthwork was built in a quarry lake 10-to-15 feet deep. It was 140 feet in diameter, with the canal 12 feet wide, and built of white and yellow sand. The accompanying Spiral Hill is made of earth, black topsoil, and white sand, and is 75 feet in diameter at its base. The work is still being maintained and occasionally opened for visitors.

== Unrealized projects ==
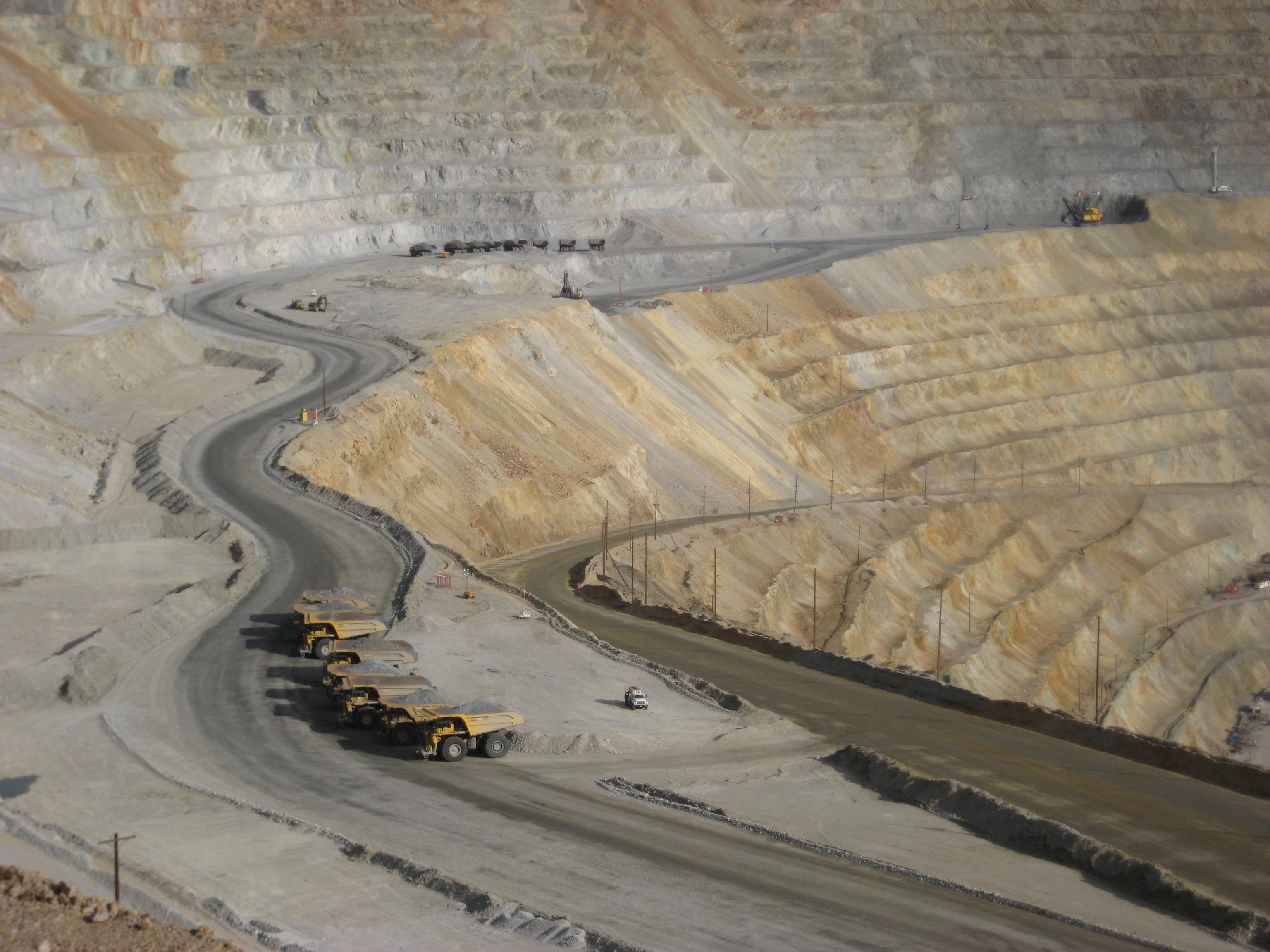
Bingham Copper Mine, Bingham, Utah

During his lifetime, Smithson created several proposals for projects that were unrealized, either due to their visionary nature, lack of support or their impracticality. Between 1966 and 1967 he produced Proposals for the Dallas-Fort Worth Regional Airport as concepts for "aerial art", monumental-scaled earthworks to be seen by air travelers. In 1970 Smithson created a series of drawings for Floating Island: To Travel around Manhattan Island. The proposed project consisted of a barge containing broken concrete or glass to be pulled by a tugboat around Manhattan. Other versions of the project were of a barge filled with earth and planted with trees and other vegetation. In 1971 he drew Towards the Development of a "Cinema Cavern", a design for a theater to be built inside a cave with spelunkers as the intended audience. In 1973 he designed the Bingham Canyon Reclamation Project, a visionary proposal for the three-mile-wide (4.8 km) copper pit mine in Utah owned by the Kennecott Copper Corporation. The mining company responded negatively to the proposal and it was never built.

== Collections ==
Smithson's work is held in numerous public collections around the world including the Museum of Modern Art, New York; the Smithsonian American Art Museum; Solomon R. Guggenheim Museum, New York; the Tate Modern, London; and the Whitney Museum of American Art, New York; among others.

== Death and legacy ==
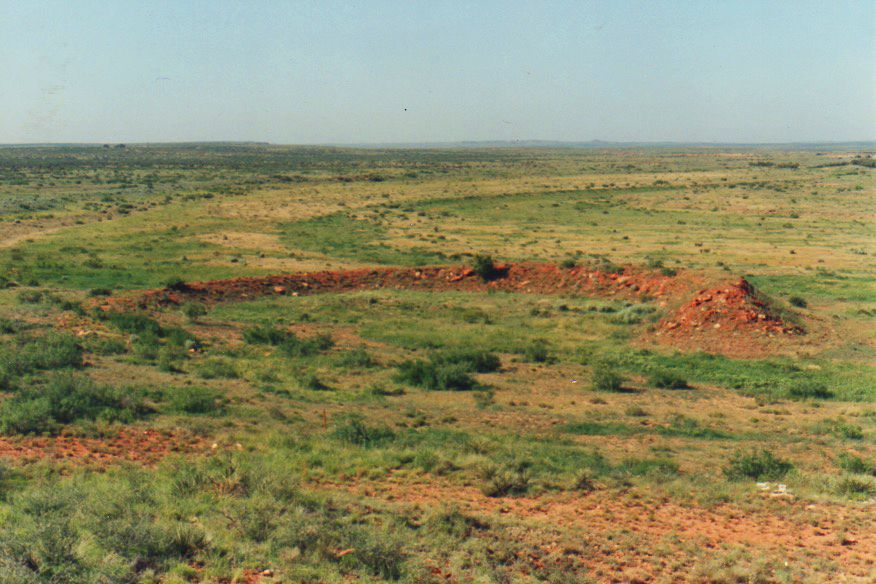
Amarillo Ramp in 1989

On July 20, 1973, Smithson, a photographer, and the pilot died in a light aircraft crash while inspecting the site of Amarillo Ramp on the ranch of Stanley Marsh 3 near Amarillo, Texas, in a Beechcraft Baron E55; the National Transportation Safety Board attributed the accident to the pilot's failure to maintain airspeed, with distraction being a contributing factor. The work was subsequently completed by Smithson's widow Nancy Holt, Richard Serra and Tony Shafrazi. It was originally built to rise from a shallow artificial lake, but the lake later dried up, and the earthwork has become overgrown and eroded.

Smithson has a following among many contemporary artists. Artists Tacita Dean, Sam Durant, Renée Green, Lee Ranaldo, Vik Muniz, Mike Nelson, and the Bruce High Quality Foundation have all made homages to Smithson's works.

In 2017 the Holt/Smithson Foundation was founded to preserve, through public service, the investigative spirit of the two artists who "developed innovative methods of exploring our relationship with the planet, and expanded the limits of artistic practice." The goal of the foundation is to "increase awareness of both artists' creative legacies".

== Gallery ==
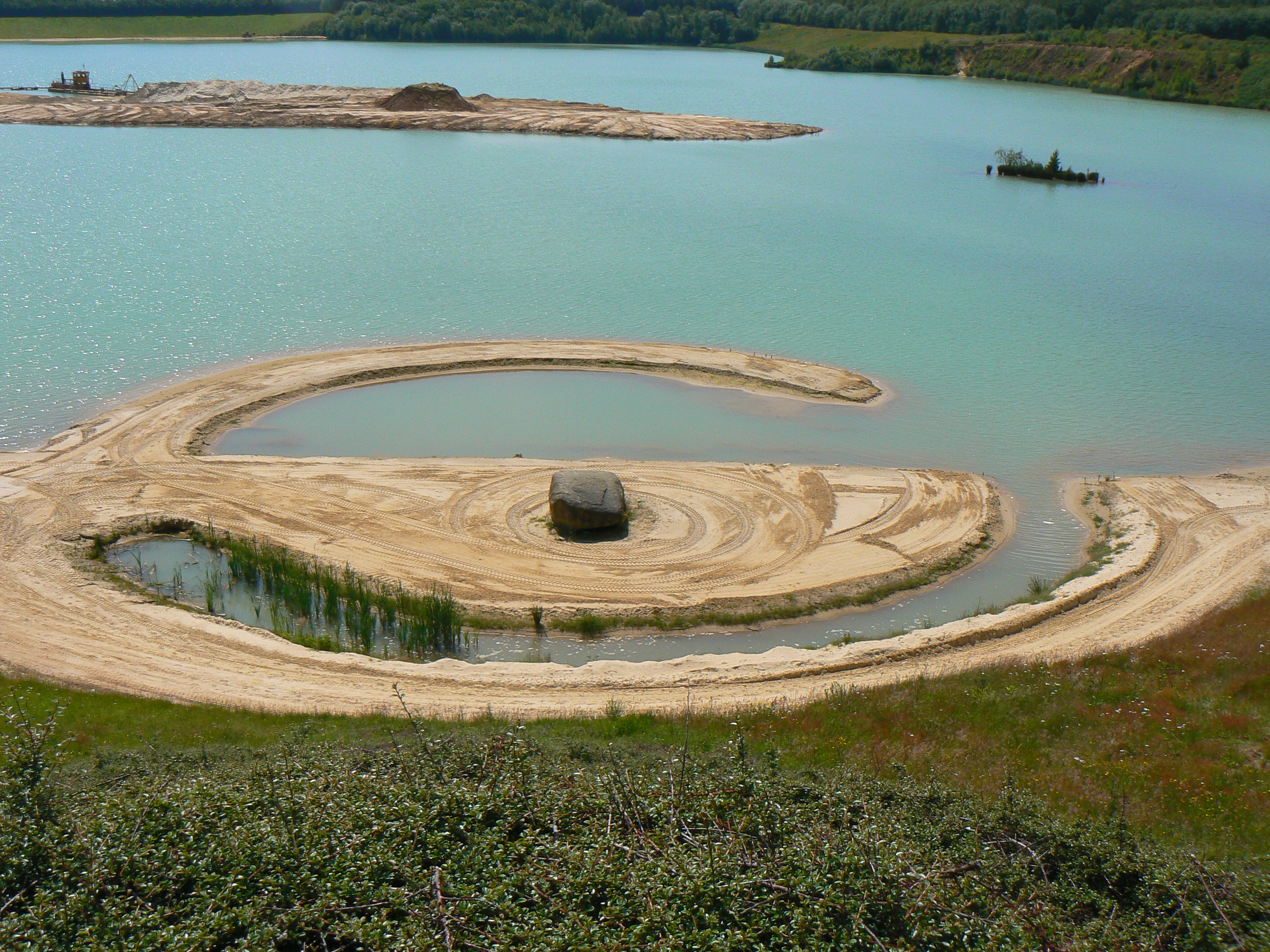
Broken Circle, Emmen, The Netherlands

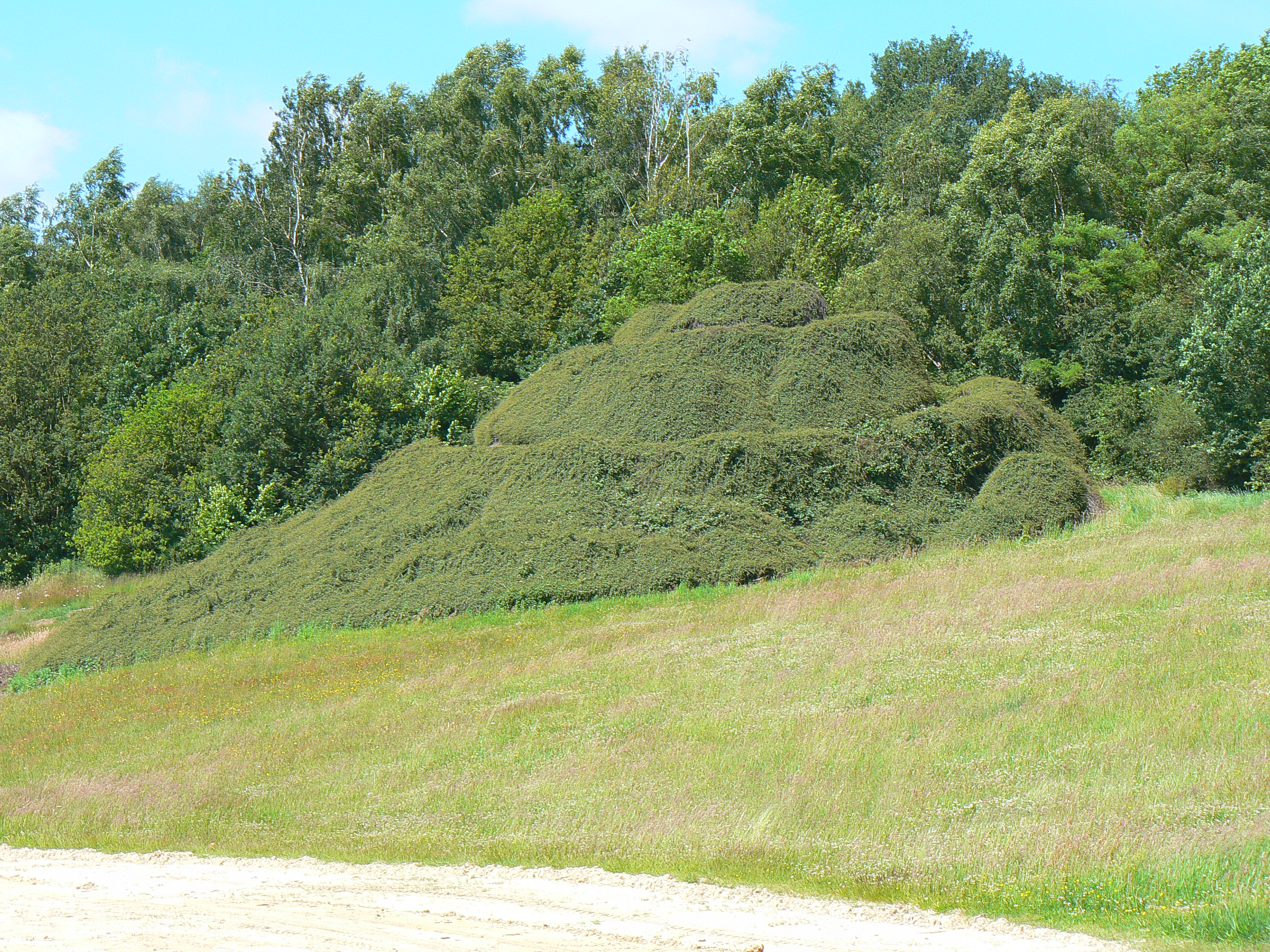
Spiral Hill, Emmen, The Netherlands

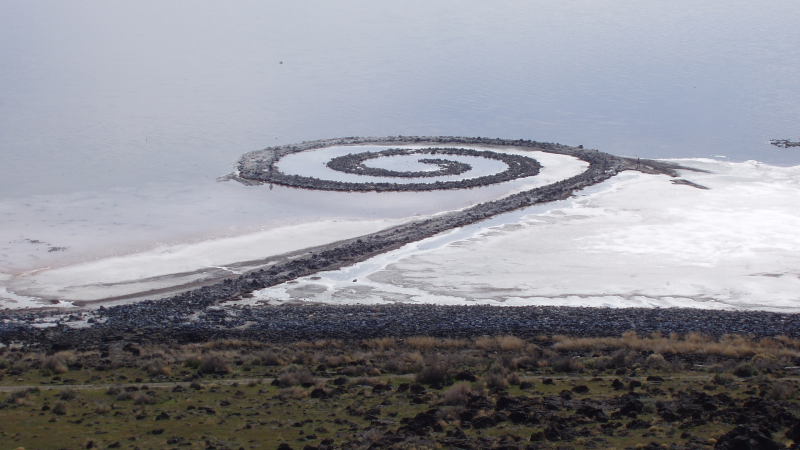
Spiral Jetty, Utah, US

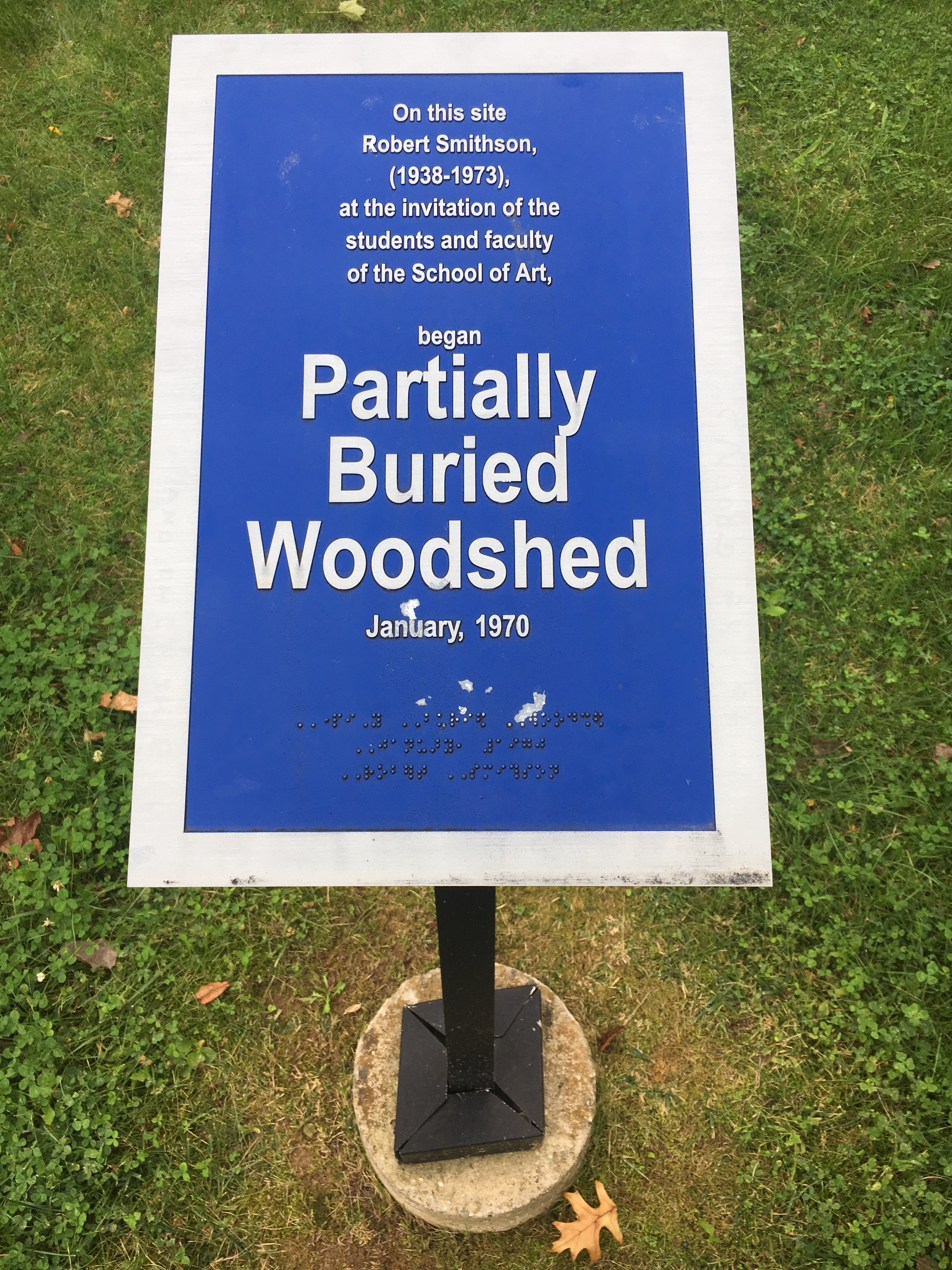
Partially Buried Woodshed plaque, Kent, OH, US

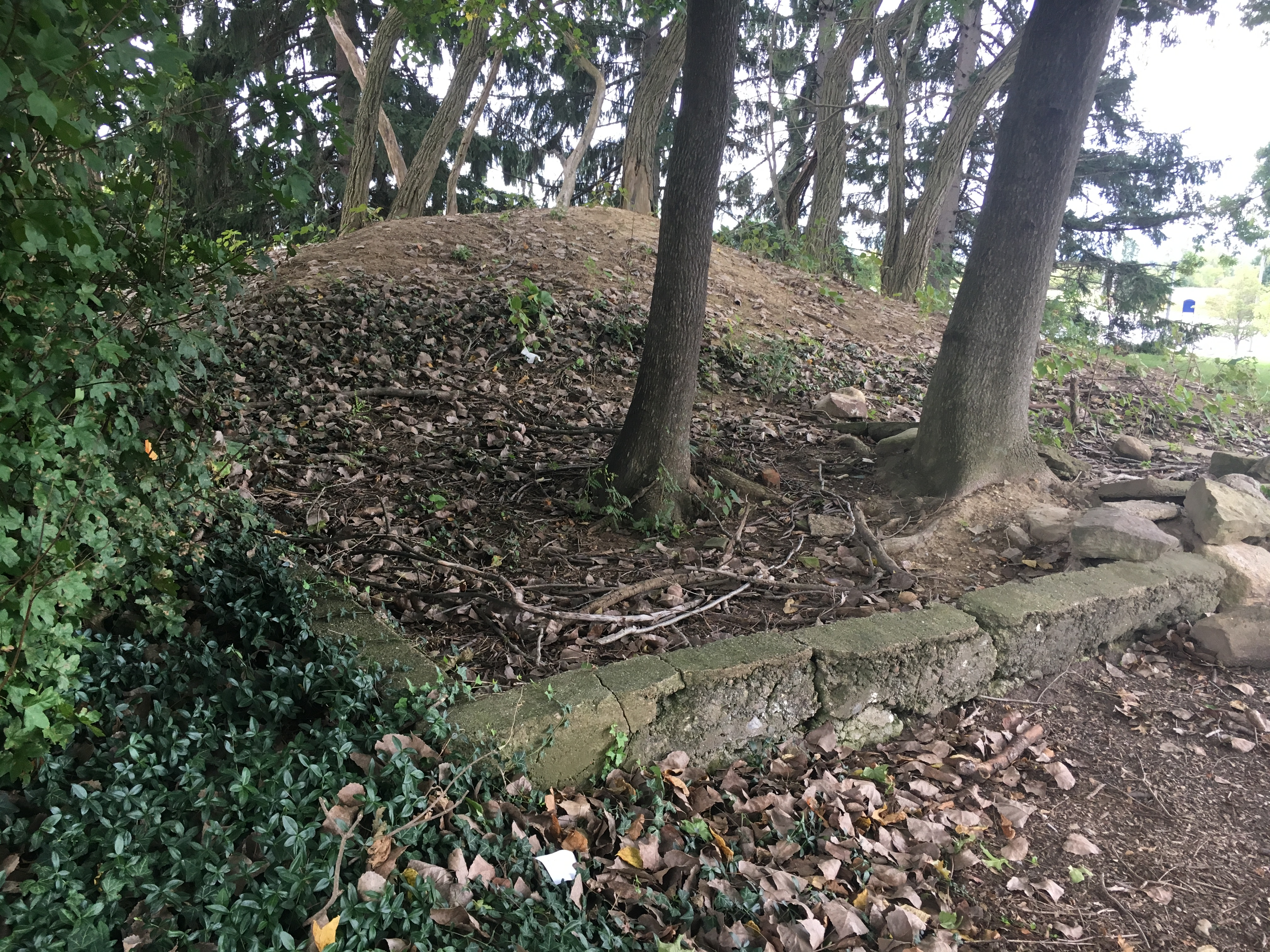
Partially Buried Woodshed remains, Kent, OH, US

== Bibliography ==
- Halley, Peter (May 1981), "Beat, Minimalism, New Wave, and Robert Smithson", Arts Magazine, New York
- Halley, Peter (1985), Robert Smithson: The Early Work 1959 - 1962, New York: Diane Brown Gallery, OCLC 11987681
- Busch, Julia M. (1974), A Decade of Sculpture: the New Media in the 1960s, Philadelphia: The Art Alliance Press, ISBN 0-87982-007-1, OCLC 804815
- Kimmelman, Michael (June 24, 2005), "Sculpture From the Earth, But Never Limited by It", The New York Times. Retrieved June 2, 2007.
- Smithson, Robert (1969), "Incidents of mirror-travel in the Yucatan", Artforum, vol. VIII, no. 1, ISSN 0004-3532, OCLC 1514329
- Smithson, Robert (1996), Flam, Jack D. (ed.), Robert Smithson: The Collected Writings, Berkeley: University of California Press, OCLC 32853450
- Roberts, Jennifer L. (September 2000), "Landscapes of Indifference: Robert Smithson and John Lloyd Stephens in Yucatan", The Art Bulletin
- Ingrid Commandeur and Trudy van Riemsdijk-Zandee: Robert Smithson: Art in Continual Movement. Alauda Publications, Amsterdam (2012), ISBN 978-90-815314-8-1
- Schwendener, Martha (June 29, 2012), "New Jersey Images, Unbound by Galleries", New York Times
- Crow, Thomas (2005), Robert Smithson (exhibition catalog), Los Angeles and Berkeley, California: The Museum of Contemporary Art, Los Angeles and the University of California Press, Berkeley, ISBN 0-520-24408-7
