= Lions Municipal Golf Course =

United States historic center

- U.S. National Register of Historic Places
- U.S. Historic district
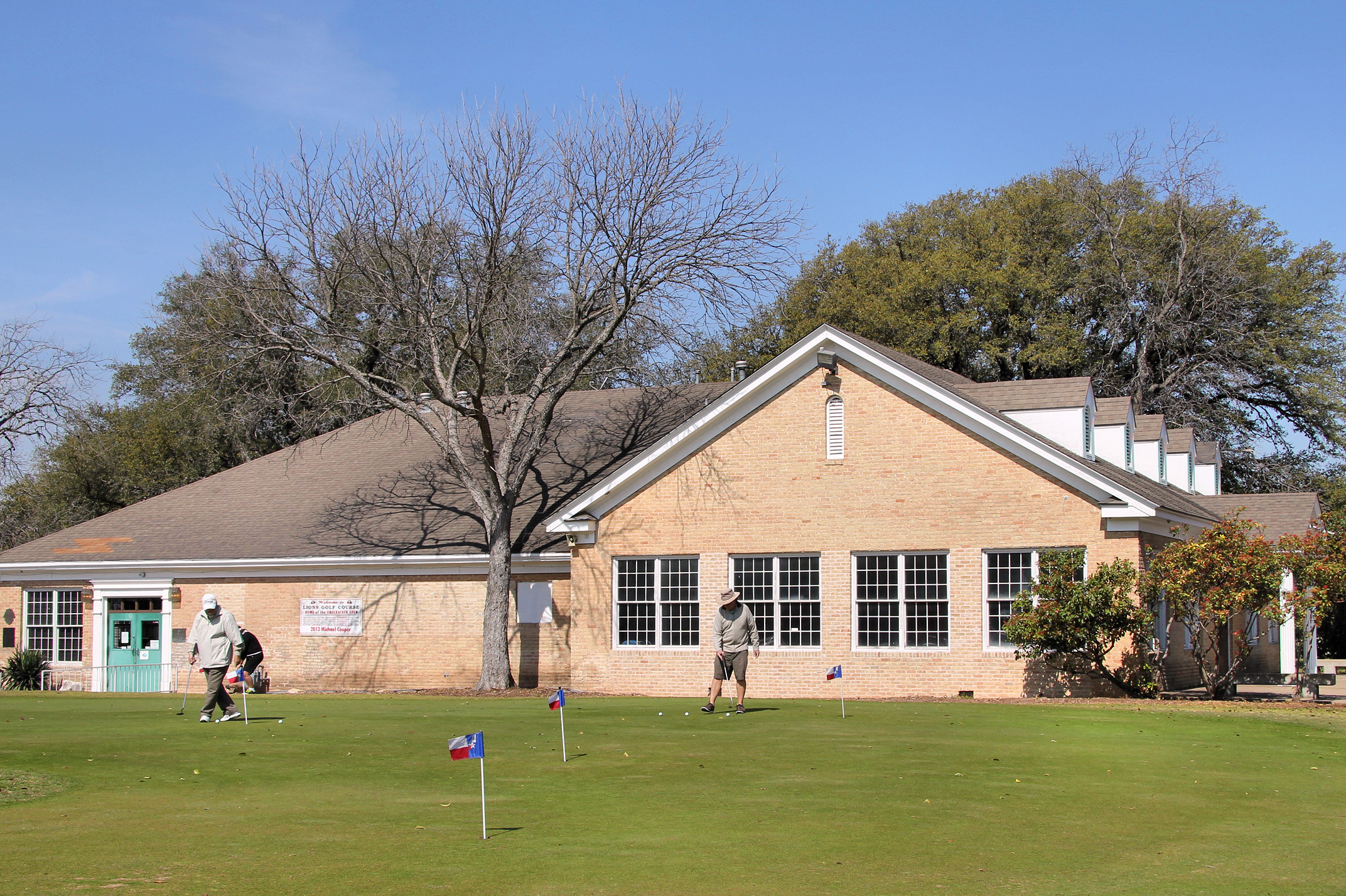
- The Lions Municipal Golf Course clubhouse and putting green
- Location: Austin, Texas
- Coordinates: 30.2922°N 97.7811°W
- Built: 1924
- NRHP reference No.: 100000757

Lions Municipal Golf Course, nicknamed Muny, is a municipal golf course at 2901 Enfield Road in Austin, Texas. The golf course occupies 141 acres of land the City of Austin leases from the University of Texas since 1937 as part of the greater Brackenridge Tract. The golf course has been subject to ongoing controversy due to the recommended termination of the current term by the University of Texas in 2019. A report commissioned by the city found that Muny's burdensome property lease payment is a primary challenge in operating Austin's public golf courses.

== History ==
Lions Municipal Golf Course was established in 1924 by Austin Lions Club members with a vision for a modern, inclusive municipal golf course. Lions Municipal was the first public golf course and clubhouse in Austin and would remain so until July 1949 when Austin's “North Side” Municipal Golf Course—today Hancock Golf Course—opened on the grounds of the old Austin Country Club. B. F. Rowe, recognized as the first Lions Club member to propose the municipal golf course, volunteered to oversee its design and construction. By the fall of 1924 the heavily wooded tract had been converted into an attractive nine-hole golf course. Construction of the back nine holes completed the course by September 1925. The course clubhouse, designed by Edwin C. Kreisle, opened in 1930.

The University of Texas golf team first competed in the Southwest Conference in May 1928 in a tournament held at Lions Municipal. Inaugural coach of the Longhorns golf team, Tom Penick earned two conference titles during his 1927–30 tenure. He also served as the head golf professional at Lions Municipal from 1927 to 1961. He was succeeded at UT by his brother Harvey Penick, the legendary golf coach who earned twenty NCAA conference titles during 1931–63. Lions Municipal would remain a favorite hometown course for the UT Golf Team. In April 1948, the UT golfers voted to play home matches with other Southwest Conference schools, as well as their own weekly challenge matches, at the Lions Municipal course.

On December 17, 1936, the Austin Municipal Golf and Amusement Association transferred their lease for the course to the City of Austin. Ever since the Association was dissolved on April 21, 1938, Lions Municipal Golf Course has been known by several names but often summarized with the nickname “Lions Muny” or, more succinctly, “Muny.” After assuming the lease from the Austin Lions Club, the City of Austin initiated a series of improvements to the course and grounds in 1936–39.

In 1972 UT regent Chairman Frank Erwin wanted to turn a profit on the 150-acre property. He sought to end the lease and sell the land to developers. Golfers and neighborhood activists joined forces with the city to stop the sale. One activist, Mary Arnold, was familiar with land-use history and knew that in 1910 when the George Brackenridge family donated the land there were conditions to prevent UT from selling the land. In 1973 after months of wrangling, the city and UT struck a deal that allowed the city to lease the land for 1$ a year until 1987. In return the city paid to upgrade and move Red River Street for UT.

The Save Muny organization was created in 1987 to assure Muny remained city owned and open to the public. Save Muny, the city and UT came to another temporary agreement in 1987. Rent would go up $175,000 a year and then would increase every five years, until it would be $425,000 a year in 2017. Save Muny sought a new deal in 1989. After negotiations the city's lease was extended to 2019. By 2008 the city was paying UT $345,600 a year. As of 2019 the city was paying UT $500,000 per year to lease the golf course land.

== Hogan's Hole ==
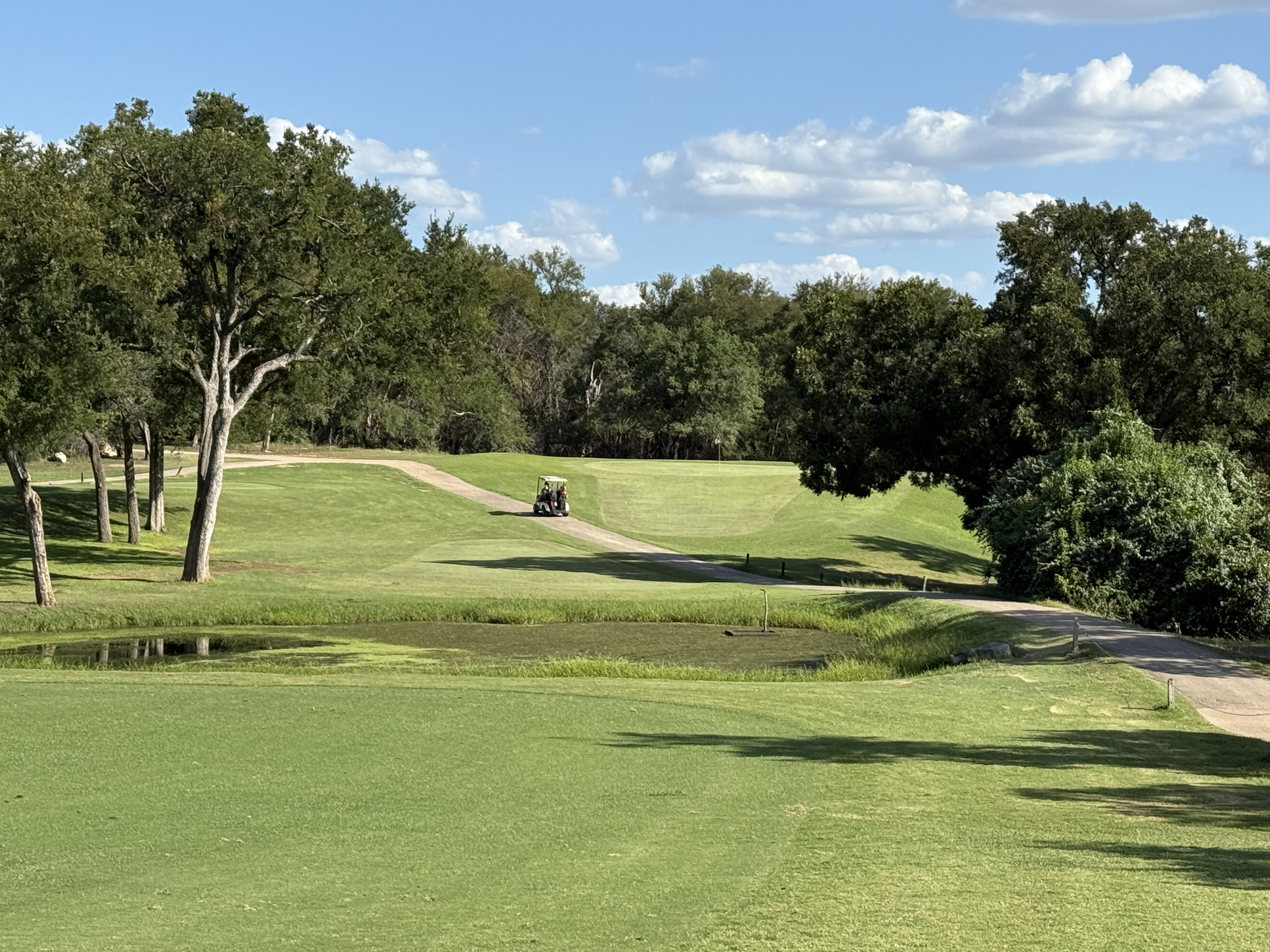
View from the fairway of the 16th hole at Lions Municipal Golf Course, Austin Texas

World Golf Hall of Famer, Ben Hogan, played with Harvey Penick (against Ed Hopkins and Morris Williams Jr.]) in an exhibition match at Muny in 1950 prior to the 1950 US Open. During the match, it is said that Hogan stood on the tee box of the daunting seventh hole (currently #16) and asked “Where’s the fairway?”. Albert Warren “Tilly” Tillinghast, eminent golf course architect, is said to have “emboldened” the seventh hole by moving the green up a hill and adding space for a water hazard. Tillinghast began a national tour of golf courses in the summer of 1935 as a consultant for the Professional Golfers' Association of America. He consulted at Lions Municipal in December 1936, praising the course as “very prettily situated” and suggesting changes to tees and greens on the third, seventh, and eighth holes. Hogan went on to birdie this now-famous Par 4, known as ‘Hogan’s Hole’. After the match, Hogan apparently signed a few autographs and commented that the course was “so good, it makes you think you’re not in Texas.”

== Desegregation of Muny ==
Muny was the first public golf course in the South to desegregate. As such, the course also plays a pivotal role in the history of race relations in public recreational spaces. The story of Muny's desegregation and its historical context strongly reverberates in our nation's culture and democratic traditions. African Americans helped to construct Muny and later worked at the course as caddies. But until 1950, African American golfers in Austin were relegated to playing golf in places like Rosewood Playground where there were complaints of golf balls hitting children as well as breaking windows and windshields.` In late 1950 – following the Supreme Court’s decision in Sweatt v. Painter but well before Brown v Board of Education – Muny quietly became the first desegregated public golf course in the southern United States.

Joe Louis golfing at Lions Muny

Mayor Taylor Glass recalled rushing to City Hall sometime during late 1950 to consult with two other council members (Mayor Pro Tem Bill Drake and Will Johnson) about whether to arrest two young African Americans who had walked on to play Lions Municipal Golf Course (Figure 18). Together they decided to let them play, and the two youths completed their round without interference or arrest. According to interviews with former African American caddies, blacks could play freely thereafter at Muny. The course regularly attracted black golfers from the region and across Texas. Joe Louis, the former heavyweight-boxing champion and, at that time, golf’s ambassador to black America, played the course in July 1953, shooting near par.

The desegregation of Muny and then other local facilities during 1950–1954 occurred without publicized debate or conflict, in contrast to the hostile resistance against the desegregation of public facilities that characterized many communities in the South. What occurred at Muny in late 1950 and early 1951 is without question the first instance in the Southern states of the old confederacy when a municipal golf course was integrated. Following Muny’s desegregation, the racial integration of other public facilities in Austin also occurred well before Brown v. Board of Education. In December 1951, the Austin public library system was integrated. And in 1952, three “precedent-breaking Negro fireman” were appointed and assigned to an integrated fire station on Lydia Street.

== Notable Tournaments and Players ==
Lions Municipal has hosted the Firecracker amateur tournament every year in July since 1945. Notable past champions include: Bill Penn (Texas Golf Hall of Fame), Randy Petri (PGA Tour), Ben Crenshaw (World Golf Hall of Fame and PGA Tour), Tom Kite (World Golf Hall of Fame and PGA Tour), and Omar Uresti (PGA Tour). During its long history, Muny has hosted (and drawn praise from) numerous distinguished golfers. In 1948, World Golf Hall of Famer Byron Nelson played at Lions Municipal and declared it to be “one of the finest courses in this part of the country”.

World Golf Hall of Famer Ben Crenshaw grew up in Austin, just blocks from Lions Municipal where he honed his game as a youth. He was the youngest player to win the Austin Men's City Championship in 1967, earning two more victories in 1968 and 1969 before retiring from the event. He played golf at the University of Texas, supporting team championships in 1971 and 1972. Crenshaw is the only player to win the NCAA individual championship in three consecutive years (1971–73). In 1972 he shared the honors with teammate Tom Kite. Winner of nineteen PGA Tour events and two-time Masters Tournament champion in 1984 and 1995, Crenshaw still returns regularly to play at Muny where he shares the course record at 61. Tom Kite is another World Golf Hall of Famer who developed as a player at Lions Municipal. After moving to Austin at age 13, he was Crenshaw's friend and All-American teammate at the University of Texas where he was coached by Harvey Penick. Kite won nineteen events on the PGA Tour, including the 1992 U.S. Open, and played on seven U.S. Ryder Cup teams, serving as captain in 1997.

== Save Muny Initiative ==
The SaveMuny initiative has slowly gained traction as the current lease over the course expires in May 2019. Potential commercial development of the course has been explored, which prompted the National Trust for Historic Preservation to include the course on its annual list of "11 Most Endangered Historic Places in America" in 2017. Ben Crenshaw has been adamant in his support for the preservation of Muny. In 2017, Crenshaw, a renowned golf course architect himself with his design partner Bill Coore, revealed a proposal to extensively renovate and restore Lions. This plan would have rerouted several holes back to their original direction and move the location of the clubhouse. This plan has not been enacted.
