= Spiral Jetty =

Earthwork sculpture by Robert Smithson

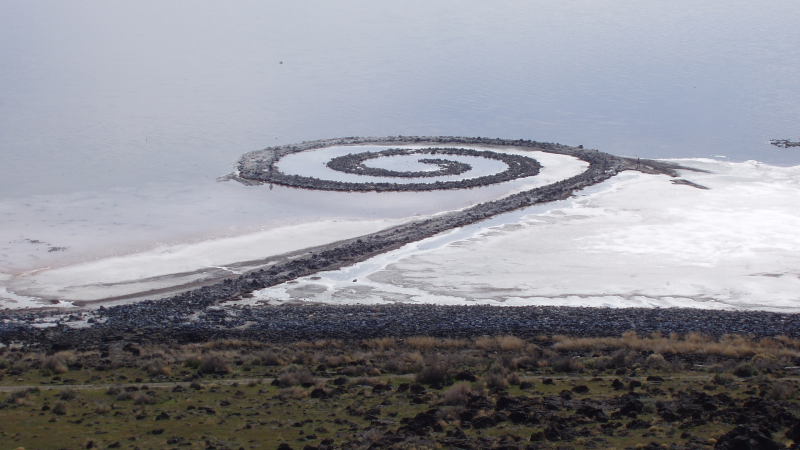
- Spiral Jetty from Rozel Point
- Artist: Robert Smithson
- Year: 1970
- Type: Sculpture
- Medium: Basalt rock, salt crystals, earth, water
- Dimensions: 4.6 m × 460 m (15 ft × 1500 ft)
- Location: Rozel Point, Great Salt Lake, Utah; 41.4377°N 112.6689°W
- Owner: Dia Art Foundation

Spiral Jetty is a work of land art constructed in April 1970 that is considered to be the most important work by American sculptor Robert Smithson. Smithson documented the construction of the sculpture in a 32-minute color film also titled Spiral Jetty. Built on the northeastern shore of the Great Salt Lake near Rozel Point in Utah entirely of mud, salt crystals, and basalt rocks, Spiral Jetty forms a 1,500-foot-long (460 m), 15-foot-wide (4.6 m) counterclockwise coil jutting from the shore of the lake.

In 1999, the artwork was donated to the Dia Art Foundation; it is one of 12 locations and sites owned by the foundation. Since its initial construction, those interested in its fate have dealt with questions of proposed changes in land use in the area surrounding the sculpture. In order to preserve the work, Dia asks that visitors not take existing rocks from the artwork, make fire pits, or trample vegetation. There are no facilities at the site, so visitors must carry any waste away with them.

== Description ==
The sculpture is built of mud, precipitated salt crystals, and basalt rocks. It forms a 1,500-foot-long (460 m), 15-foot-wide (4.6 m) counterclockwise coil originally jutting from the shore of the lake, though due to the drying of the lake, as of 2022 a mile of lakebed separates Spiral Jetty from the shore. Depending upon the water level of the Great Salt Lake, the sculpture is sometimes visible and sometimes submerged.

== Construction ==
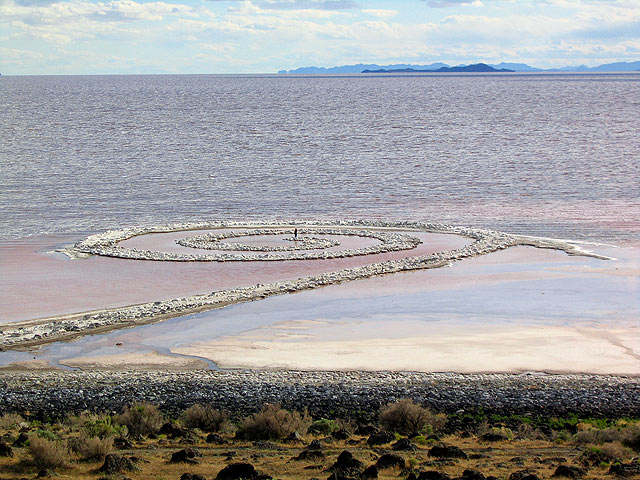
Person standing in the middle of Spiral Jetty, viewed from the shore

Smithson reportedly chose the Rozel Point site based on the blood-red color of the water and its connection with the primordial sea. The red hue of the water is due to the presence of salt-tolerant bacteria and algae that thrive in the extreme 27 percent salinity of the lake's north arm, which was isolated from freshwater sources by the building of a causeway by the Southern Pacific Railroad in 1959.

Smithson was reportedly attracted to the Rozel Point site because of the stark anti-pastoral beauty and industrial remnants from nearby Golden Spike National Historic Site, as well as an old pier and a few unused oil rigs. While observing the construction of the piece from a helicopter, Smithson reportedly remarked "et in Utah ego" as a counterpoint to the pastoral Baroque painting et in Arcadia ego by Nicolas Poussin.

To move the rock into the lake, Smithson hired Bob Phillips of nearby Ogden, Utah, who used two dump trucks, a large tractor, and a front end loader to haul the 6,650 tons of rock and earth into the lake. It is reported that Smithson had a difficult time convincing a contractor to accept the unusual proposal. Spiral Jetty was the first of his pieces to require the acquisition of land rights and earthmoving equipment. Phillips often told people that his best-known construction job was "the only thing I ever built that ... was to look at and had no purpose".

Phillips described the use of earth-moving equipment along the lakeside as "tricky", and said of Smithson that "I don't think he had done any geology work or anything on it. He just had in his mind what it should look like.... He just had the eye for it. I assume it was the artist in him." Work began on the jetty in April 1970. The work was constructed twice; the first time requiring six days. After contemplating the result for two days, Smithson called the crew back and had the shape altered to its present configuration, an effort requiring moving 7,000 tons of basalt rock during an additional three days.

Phillips' son appeared on the PBS Antiques Roadshow program in 2017 with a photograph and collection of documents related to the building of the project.

== Ownership ==
The sculpture was financed in part by a $9,000 USD grant from the Virginia Dwan Gallery of New York. In 1999, Spiral Jetty was donated to Dia. As owner and custodian of Spiral Jetty, the foundation maintains the lease from the Utah Division of Forestry, Fire & State Lands of state sovereign lands in Great Salt Lake upon which the artwork is sited.

Smithson died in a plane crash in Texas three years after finishing the Spiral Jetty.

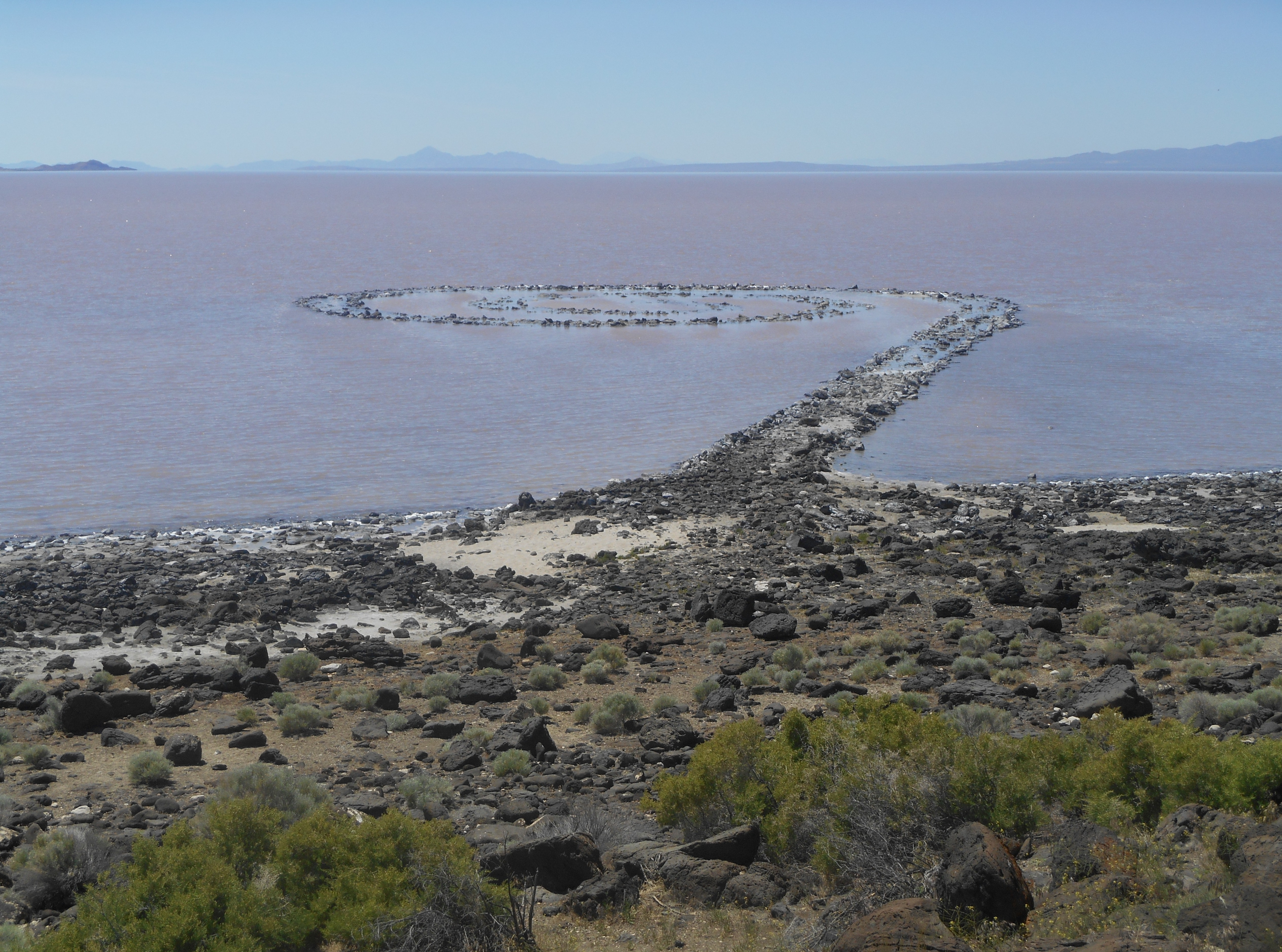
Spiral Jetty in June 2013

Dia, along with the Holt/Smithson Foundation, claim ownership of copyright for Spiral Jetty. However, the work itself does not meet the legal standard for copyrightable material, which in the United States includes the stipulation that a work must be "fixed" in a "tangible medium." While Spiral Jetty was created in a tangible medium, its inherent physical composition — piles of dirt, rocks, and salt that are subject to the erosive forces of the Great Salt Lake — means it is not fixed: "This lack of fixed form problematizes the work’s intellectual property protection. The heart of the work — the idea that it presents made manifest through an ephemeral environmental intervention — cannot be protected based on the guidelines provided under the Copyright Act." Dia can and does claim copyright over images of Spiral Jetty created by the foundation. However, due to the physical work's lack of copyright protection, visitors do not need permission to create or publish their own photographs of the sculpture.

== Preservation ==
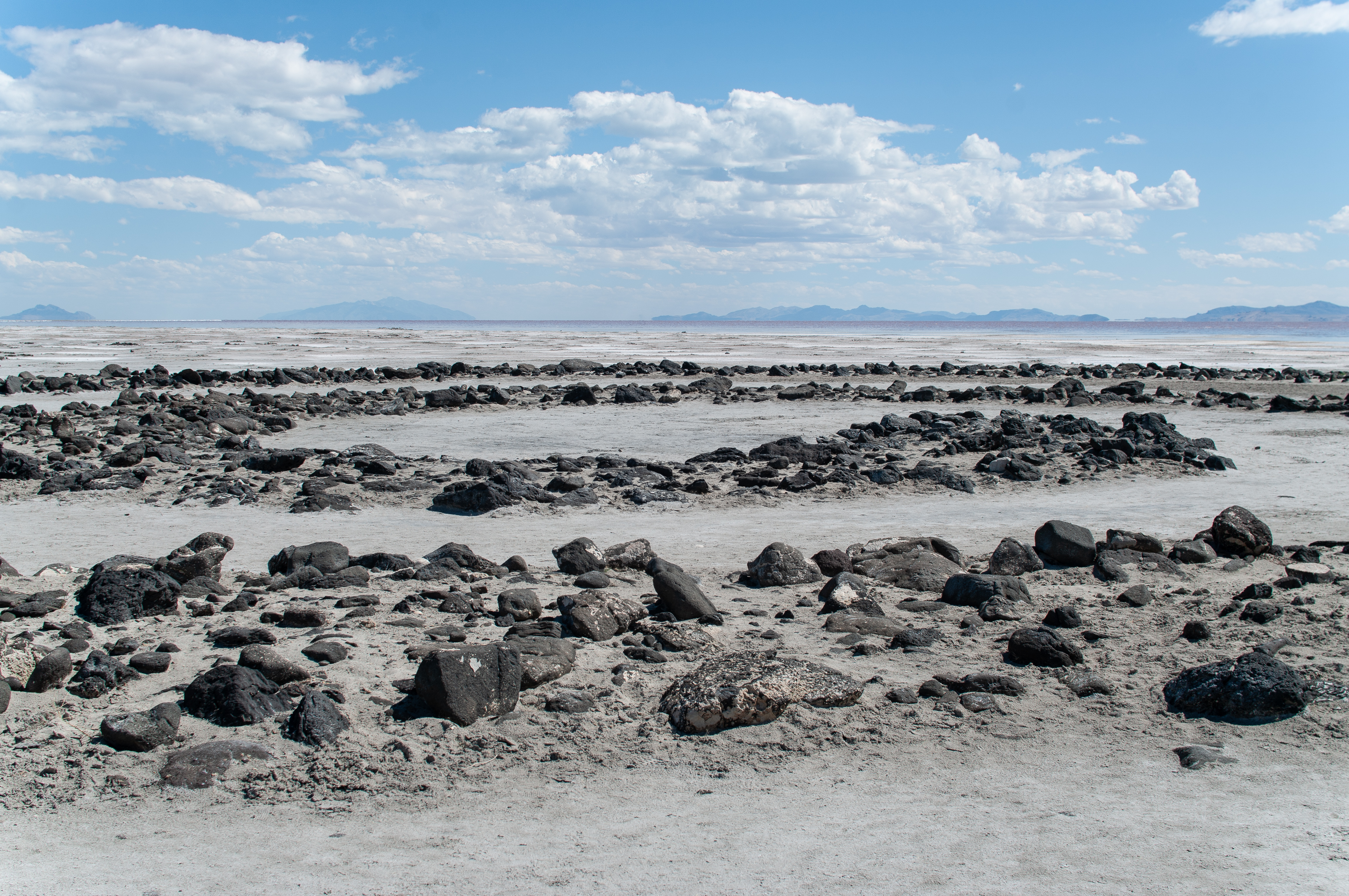
Approaching the dry Spiral Jetty on June 18, 2018

Preservation efforts for Spiral Jetty face considerable challenges due to the remote location of the site and its vulnerability to natural environmental conditions. These challenges are exacerbated by the impacts of climate change and increased tourism activity.

At the time Dia acquired Spiral Jetty, the work was fully submerged in the lake. Beginning in the early 2000s, however, sustained drought in Utah caused water levels to recede, and Spiral Jetty became visible for the first prolonged period in its history. As a result, the prominence of Spiral Jetty has risen dramatically over the past decade, increasing both the visitorship to the site and the public's interest in the artwork, at the local, national, and international levels.

Dia is committed to maintaining a photographic record of the work and documenting changes to the piece over time. Dia collaborates with two organizations in Utah, the Great Salt Lake Institute at Westminster College (GSLI) and the Utah Museum of Fine Arts (UMFA) at the University of Utah, who have been deeply involved in the advocacy of Spiral Jetty over the years.

In 2008, plans were announced for exploratory oil drilling approximately five miles from the jetty. This was met with strong resistance from artists, and the state of Utah received more than 3,000 emails about the plan, most of them opposing the drilling.

The year 2009 marked a collaboration between Dia and the Getty Conservation Institute, with the objective of creating a repeat photography system. This system was specifically designed to document the evolving changes taking place at the Spiral Jetty site and to closely monitor it for any conservation requirements.

Starting in late 2016, Dia initiated the practice of sharing aerial photographs of Spiral Jetty, captured twice a year since 2012. These photographs were taken from nearly identical vantage points as part of Dia's dedication to documenting the evolving changes of the artwork over time through photographic records.

The issue of preservation has been complicated by ambiguous statements by Smithson, who expressed an admiration for entropy in that he intended his works to mimic earthly attributes in that they remain in a state of arrested disruption and not be kept from destruction.

Dia's website states that visitors are prohibited from removing rocks from the artwork or from stepping on vegetation that is on the grounds of the artwork. Visitors are also prohibited from constructing fire pits near the artwork or on the parking lot. If caught, visitors will face strict fines. The website also states that visitors are instructed to carry out their waste.

== Film ==
External videos
- Smithson, Spiral Jetty, 1970, Smarthistory
- Sunrise over Spiral Jetty, J. Paul Getty Trust

In 1970 during the construction of the jetty, Robert Smithson wrote and directed a 32-minute color film, Spiral Jetty. The film was shot by Smithson and his wife Nancy Holt, and funded by Virginia Dwan and Douglas Christmas.

The film documented the construction process and also formed an ancillary artwork. Smithson combines his interest in geology, paleontology, astronomy, mythology and cinema, stating that he had an interest in documenting "the earth's history". In conjunction with filmed sequences of the jetty, Smithson incorporates footage of dinosaurs in a natural history museum and the ripped pages from a history text. During this scene, Smithson refers to the institutions of history: "the earth's history seems at times like a story recorded in a book, each page of which is torn into small pieces. Many of the pages and some of the pieces of each page are missing". Smithson's narrative supports an alternative view of historical discourse and the art object's placement or production outside of the museum institution. His writings also indicate that the helicopter film sequences over the jetty were a method of "recapitulating the scale of the jetty". By visually disorienting the viewer, Smithson is able to negate a time and place for the materiality of the artwork or create what he calls a "cosmic rupture". Through this state, the viewer is meant to be unable to categorize or classify the site, and will be left in a state free from the dialect of history.

The film has been described as Smithson's attempt to "leave the viewer with a sense that the monumental artwork is connected to a vast mental landscape of meanings and associations".

== Legacy ==
The work was named Utah's official state work of land art in 2017. April 2020 marked the Spiral Jetty's 50th anniversary, which Smithson referred to shortly before his death in 1973 as "the work of the decade". It was listed on the National Register of Historic Places in 2024.

== Criticism ==
The ephemeral nature of the Spiral Jetty (sometimes visible, sometimes submerged) sparked inquiries into the enduring influence of the artwork and the importance of its various representations, such as photographs, films, and essays. The photographs played a critical role in preserving and promoting the earthwork's growing renown, acting as the primary connection between the object and its state of being forgotten. Smithson's conceptual framework, centered around the concepts of temporality and entropy, emphasized the dynamic and destructive elements at play, often referencing the gradual decline and disintegration of the artwork. Through his essays and interviews, the artist articulated his awareness of these forces at work within his artistic practice. Borrowing from the term entropy, Smithson indicated that the earthworks were "suggestions of sites external to the gallery situation".

In his 1970 interview, Smithson mentioned his interest in working on raw materials with abstract geometrical forms. The ephemeral material changes the properties of the artwork over time, which could be regarded as process-oriented art. In the end, it "dramatizes the sense of context and discontext". With spiraling screw dislocation in the crystal formation and the enclosed nature of the Salt Lake, Smithson created a sense of containment and movement. The complexity of matter creates an irrational "surd" area. The idea of a closed space is established through the aesthetic concept of crystalline mapping.

Influenced by Wiener's system of feedback and entropy, Smithson was aware that the circulation of its photographs would have a tendency to move Spiral Jetty into an empty signifier without the signified. He mentioned in an interview, "If you make a system, you can be sure the system is bound to evade itself, so I see no point in pinning any hope on systems." Smithson realized the instability of fugitivity of one's surroundings but still required the viewers to apprehend them through their eyes and ears.

Over the decades since the unexpected submersion in 1972, Spiral Jetty has become known through its wide circulation of photographs. Scholars such as Roland Barthes, Walter Benjamin and Henri Bergson frequently debated the issue of timelessness and the fixation of its photographs and multiple referents as signifiers without the signified. Since the 1960s, the notion of life as a multi-formed complexity has challenged the concept of space as a static condition, leading to a reassessment of the notion of temporality. According to Manuel DeLanda, "Rocks and winds, germs and words, are all different manifestations of this dynamic reality...this single matter-energy expresses itself."

While time and space are seen as key in the discussion of modern sculpture, it raises challenges for analyzing Spiral Jetty through photographs as it suggests another temporality and hence different values.

As Krauss explains:

"In using the form of the spiral to imitate the settlers' mythic whirlpool, Smithson incorporates the existence of the myth into the space of the work. In doing so, he expands on the nature of that external space located at our bodies' centers, which had been part of the Double Negative's image. Smithson creates an image of our psychological response to time and of the way we are determined to control it by the creation of historical fantasies. But the Spiral Jetty attempts to supplant historical formulas with the experience of a moment-to-moment passage through space and time."

However, the site experience and the referents are not self-sufficient, as art historian Ann Morris Reynolds says:

Although I acknowledged that these descriptions were partial and distanced from their referent ... I still felt they provided visual and conceptual proxies, images and ideas, that seemed sufficient. September for the very first time, I was deeply aware of the fact that neither my on-site experience nor the descriptions that I was familiar with, both old and new, were self-sufficient or even clearly distinct.

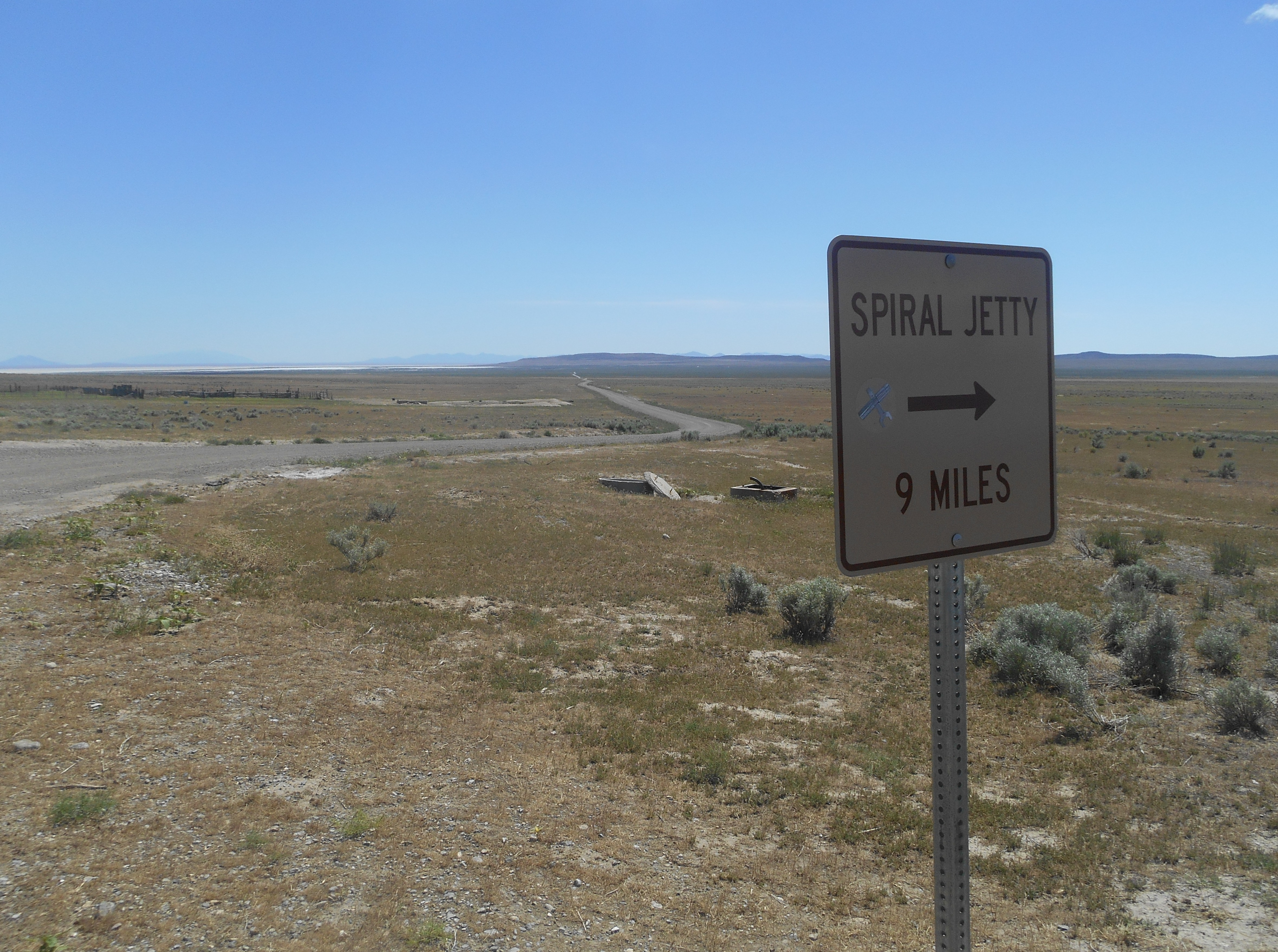
Road sign to Spiral Jetty

As time has passed since the completion of the Spiral Jetty, the photographs have become the most accessible and vivid remnants of the artwork. However, they no longer serve as helpful maps leading to a physical location; instead, they have become signs that direct viewers to an apparitional and chemically vanished object. Lunberry questions the grounding and ontological location of the Spiral Jetty, suggesting that its various manifestations, including photographs, essays, films, and the actual earthwork, refer to each other but do not fully settle on a singular object. He states:

The photographs thus remain as utterly believable substitutes, authentic apparitions, all that has been needed to restore to our eager eyes the vanished earthwork, raise the form once and for all from out of the waters that both reflect and conceal the Spiral Jetty, affirm and deny its place upon the lake.

The disappearance of the earthwork raises perplexing questions about the significance and impact of its material absence. The photographs, the essay, and the film become intertwined with the submerged earthwork, but what happens to the object itself when all that remains are these representations? Additionally, the disappearance of thousands of tons of stone and soil raises the challenge of accounting for such a massive fact. Lunberry continues:

Then, looking into our own desiring eyes, we may begin to wonder if the issue of seeing itself - the Spiral Jetty's appearance or disappearance, its ontology as an object or an image - has finally proven itself to be far more intricate and involved than initially imagined. If Henri Bergson is to be believed and "perception is only a true hallucination", then where would we have to go, what would we have to do to locate the precise vanishing point of Smithson's Spiral Jetty, to arrive at the site of our own craving, to see the source of our own hallucination?

Lunberry suggested that there is a "dialectical play arises in the process of creating affective awareness" Lunberry's affective memories were primarily produced by his own picture of the Spiral Jetty, and an active recall of his past conscious and unconscious memories of seeing the Spiral Jetty years after his last visit. Similar to Krauss, Lunberry's viewing experience involved an imaginary voyage, except that he is aware of temporality: Spiral Jetty has vanished. Lunberry stated, "the effect of a ghost whose mysterious apparitions

During and after the completion of the work, Gianfranco Gorgoni documented the Spiral Jetty with Smithson. Since 2012, the present owner of the Spiral Jetty, the Dia Foundation, has committed to annual aerial documentation. Smithson was confident that "if the work is strong enough and photographed properly, it is fed back into mass distribution".
