= Ecofeminist art =

Artistic practices grounded in ecology

Ecofeminist art emerged in the 1970s in response to ecofeminist philosophy, that was particularly articulated by writers such as Carolyn Merchant, Val Plumwood, Donna Haraway, Starhawk, Greta Gaard, Karen J. Warren, and Rebecca Solnit. Those writers emphasized the significance of relationships of cultural dominance and ethics (Merchant, Plumwood, Donna Haraway) expressed as sexism (Haraway), spirituality (Starhawk), speciesism (Warren, Gaard), capitalist values that privilege objectification and the importance of vegetarianism in these contexts (Gaard). The main issues Ecofeminism aims to address revolve around the effects of a "Eurocentric capitalist patriarchal culture built on the domination of nature, and the domination of woman 'as nature'. The writer Luke Martell in the Ecology and Society journal writes that 'women' and 'nature' are both victims of patriarchal abuse and "ideological products of the Enlightenment culture of control." Ecofeminism argues that we must become a part of nature, living with and among it. We must recognize that nature is alive and breathing and work against the passivity surrounding it that is synonymous with the passive roles enforced upon women by patriarchal culture, politics, and capitalism. Ecofeminist art is an art form that showcases the intersectionality of gender, environmentalism, and social justice. It grabs ideas and concepts from the original term "ecofeminism," which was created to highlight the parallels between the historic oppression and exploitation of both women and the environment. This art style can be presented in many different mediums, including performance art, original literary pieces, and visual art displays. In simpler terms, ecofeminist artwork is environmental art created by a woman who values gender equality and a stronger representation of nature.

The relevance of Ecofeminism was discussed in feminist art programs at the college and university level, including at the Institute for Social Ecology at Goddard College, Vermont. In the United States, as far back as 1962, an overwhelming series of lawsuits against the corporate world came from the kitchens of mothers and grandmothers. In 1964, Brazilian women set up the Acào Democràtica Feminina Gaucha, which soon evolved into an advocacy group for sustainable agriculture. Women around the world were coming together to break the "continuum of Eurocentric patriarchal capitalist exploitation of natural resources, women, and of indigenous peoples."

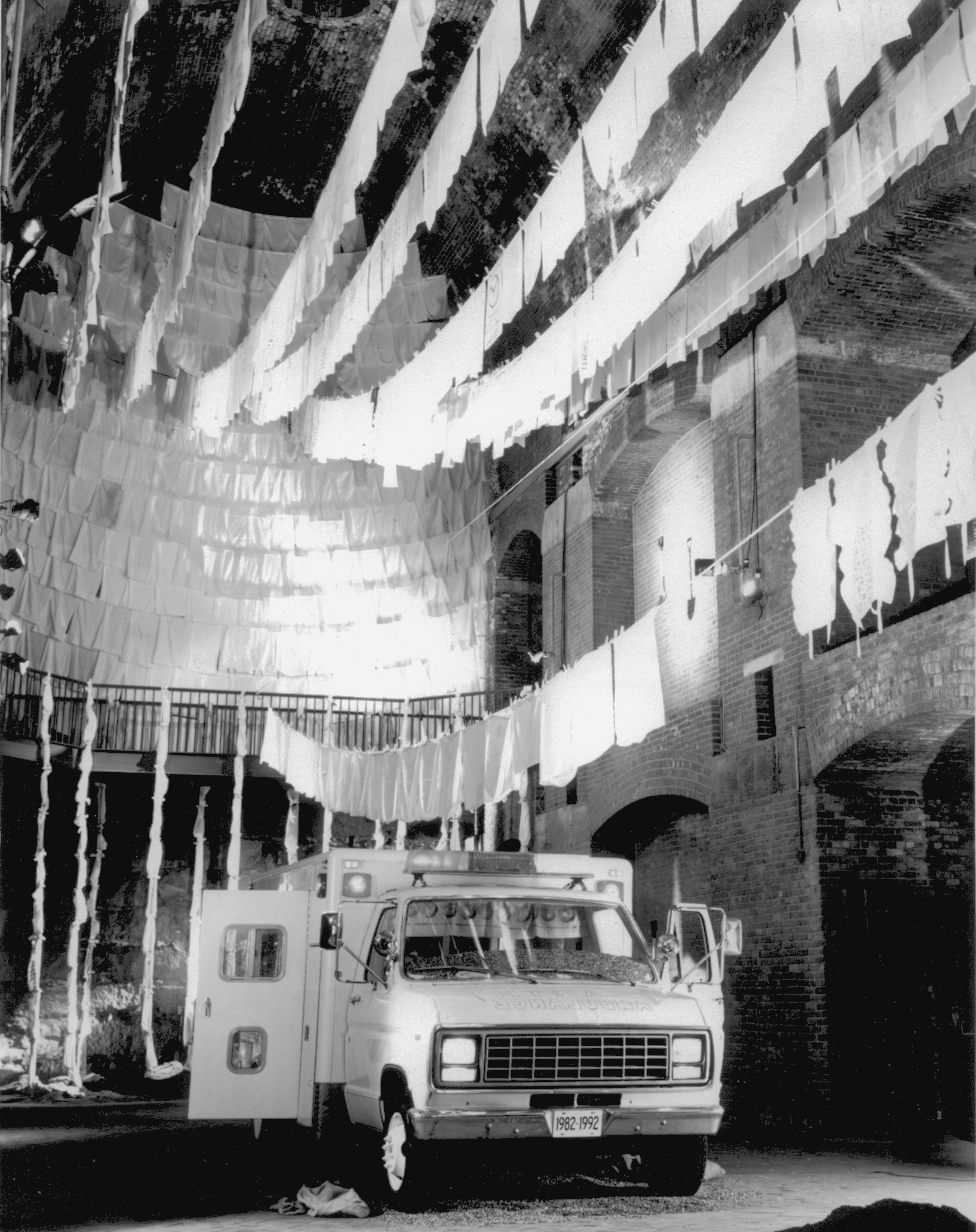
Earth Ambulance by Helène Aylon (1982 - 1992)

== Overview ==
The work of ecofeminist writers helped inspire many early male and female practitioners in the ecological art movement to imitate their concerns about a more horizontal relationship to environmental functions in their practices. The feminist art writer Lucy Lippard, who was writing for the Weather Report Show she curated, which included many ecological artists and some ecofeminist artists from the list below (2007 Boulder Museum of Contemporary Art), commented on how many of those artists were women.

One of these women mentioned is Agnes Denes, an ecofeminist artist most well known for her piece, "Wheatfield - A Confrontation: Battery Park Landfill, Downtown Manhattan" from 1982. This piece is a collection of photos taken in and around a 2-acre wheat field planted, maintained, and later harvested for the last time by the artist herself in lower Manhattan, New York, just two blocks from Wall Street. Denes planted the wheat field in the middle of a landfill that would soon become Battery Park City, set along the Hudson River. Her intention in this project was to draw attention to issues of ecological concern, such as clearing land for more housing, leading to more complex issues of food insecurity and world hunger. The city of Manhattan began construction in the area following the artists' final harvest in August of 1982, building high-rise apartment buildings on top of the landfill to provide housing for the growing population of future residents living in New York City. During the period this project was being created, wheat fields and the agriculture industry as a whole were seen by society as a symbol of economic success, representing an abundance of food and introducing global trade and commerce. Agnes Denes created this piece to depict that even the most successful urban system could not exist or be maintained without traditional agriculture, emphasizing the importance of calling attention to our 'misplaced priorities' in society.

Authors who have written about ecofeminist artists most prominently include Gloria Feman Orenstein.

The Women's Environmental Art Directory (WEAD) is a compendium of women who self-identify as environmental artists. Jo Hanson and Susan Leibovitz Steinman initiated it in the 1990s to credit women artists who the mainstream art world might not recognized. In addition to artists, ecofeminist thinking influenced some curators, such as Amy Lipton, co-curator of ecoartspace with Tricia Watts.

== List of prominent ecofeminist artists ==
- Helene Aylon
- Betty Beaumont
- Jackie Brookner
- Betsy Damon
- Agnes Denes
- Mary Beth Edelson
- Harriet Feigenbaum
- Donna Henes
- Patricia Johanson
- Jo Hanson
- Cecilia Vicuña
- Natalie Jeremijenko
- Eve Andree Laramee
- Stacy Levy
- Lenore Malen
- Mary Mattingly
- Ana Mendieta
- Eve Mosher
- Beverly Naidus
- Neozoon (artist collective)
- Aviva Rahmani
- Jatun Risba
- Rachel Rosenthal
- Mierle Laderman Ukeles
- Faith Wilding
- Linda Weintraub
- Shai Zakai
- Lily Reeves

== See also ==
- Ecovention
- Environmental art
