= Jo Hanson =

American artist (1918–2007)

- Born: August 1, 1918; Carbondale, Illinois, U.S.
- Died: March 13, 2007 (aged 88); San Francisco, California, U.S.
- Resting place: Bolinas, California, U.S.
- Known for: Environmental art

Jo Hanson (1918–2007) was an American environmental artist and activist. She lived in San Francisco, California. She was known for using urban trash to create works of art.

== Biography ==
Jo Hanson was born on August 1, 1918, in Carbondale, Illinois. She moved to California in 1955, first living in Marin County, before settling in San Francisco in the early 1970s where she purchased and restored Nightingale House, located on Buchanan Street to landmark status. Hanson obtained a Master of Education from the University of Illinois and a Master of Fine Arts from San Francisco State University.

Hanson died at her home, of cancer, on March 13, 2007, in which she was remembered by SFGate as a "green activist" who used street trash in her work.

== Career ==
As an extension of her work on the Nightingale House, Hanson set out to address the litter on her street. Her commitment to sweeping the sidewalk outside her home evolved into a public art project and citywide initiative against littering. Hanson's work was known for incorporating the detritus she collected while sweeping. She analyzed and classified what she found as a way of documenting daily life in her district and felt that it reflected a disconnect between the consumption and production of goods and the natural world.

For six years during the 1980s Hanson was a vocal member of the San Francisco Arts Commission pushing for the inclusion of underrepresented artists in the city's art collections, specifically women and people of color. She also played a key role in saving the murals of Coit Tower, and the restoration of the murals at Golden Gate Park's Beach Chalet.

In 1990 Hanson conceived of and initiated the establishment of the artist-in-residence program at Recology. The residency assists artists who use discarded materials in their art and raises public awareness about recycling. Its launch coincided with the introduction of curbside recycling in San Francisco due to state legislation passed in 1989. Approximately 200 artists have participated in the program including Michael Arcega, Jane Kim, Estelle Akamine, Terry Berlier, Val Britton, Dee Hibbert-Jones, Packard Jennings, Kara Maria, Hector Dionicio Mendoza, Sirron Norris, Isis Rodriguez, Stephanie Syjuco, and Nomi Talisman. Recology has also influenced the development of similar programs such in Philadelphia and Portland.

Hanson co-founded Women Eco Artists Dialog (WEAD), a directory of artists and researchers working with environmental themes in 1996. In a 1980 Artweek magazine opinion piece, Suzanne Lacy discussed the performative aspects and results of Hanson's process:

"In the process of doing the work, her intentions clarified, and the media became the means to communicate them. She offered public support and appreciation to street workers, a heightened awareness of our visual environment, and encouragement for individual and community responsibility in the maintenance of clean streets. Magazine interviews and television news coverage alerted the San Francisco audience to these intentions, certainly, and to one other: consistently identifying herself with her profession, Hanson created a work linking social concerns with art in a directly accessible manner."

A 2002 profile on Hanson in Body & Soul stated: "Part sociology, part ecology, Jo Hanson's artwork reflects her curiosity and understanding of how living things—people, plants, animals—live and work together. She remains excited by the newer artists and the new collaborative projects springing up all over."

== Awards ==
Hanson was awarded with a National Endowment for the Arts Artist's Fellowship in 1977, a Visual Arts Project Grant in 1979. In 1992 Hanson was awarded a Lifetime Achievement Award from the Northern California Women's Caucus for Art. The Fresno Art Museum Council of 100 recognized her as a Distinguished Woman Artist in 1998. The National Women's Caucus for Art honored her with an Outstanding Achievement in Visual Arts award in 1997.

== Works ==
Hansons work has been exhibited at The San Francisco Museum of Modern Art, Oakland Museum of California, Fresno Art Museum and Corcoran Gallery of Art among others.

“Her personal act of sweeping her sidewalk grew into a celebrated public art practice and citywide anti-litter campaign. Hanson compiled volumes of urban detritus that are now recognized as an artistic tour de force which raised community awareness as it chronicled rapidly changing demographics.”

One of Hanson's best known works is Crab Orchard Cemetery, a re-creation of her ancestral cemetery in Illinois, which opened at the Corcoran Gallery of Art in Washington, D.C., in 1974. Crab Orchard Cemetery has subsequently shown in two posthumous solo exhibitions at the Peninsula Museum of Art, in 2009 and again in 2021. It was exhibited again in 2025–26 at the Fresno Art Museum.

== Archives ==
Hanson's archives are located with several institutions including the Smithsonian Archives of American Art. Crab Orchard Cemetery is in the permanent collection of the Fresno Art Museum. It was acquired as a gift from the Peninsula Museum of Art in San Bruno, California in 2023.

== Bibliography ==
- Carlton, Josephine, Life Messages: inspirations for the woman's spirit, New York: MJF Books, 2002. ISBN 9781567316087
