= Fresno Art Museum =

Coordinates: 36.7708°N 119.7739°W

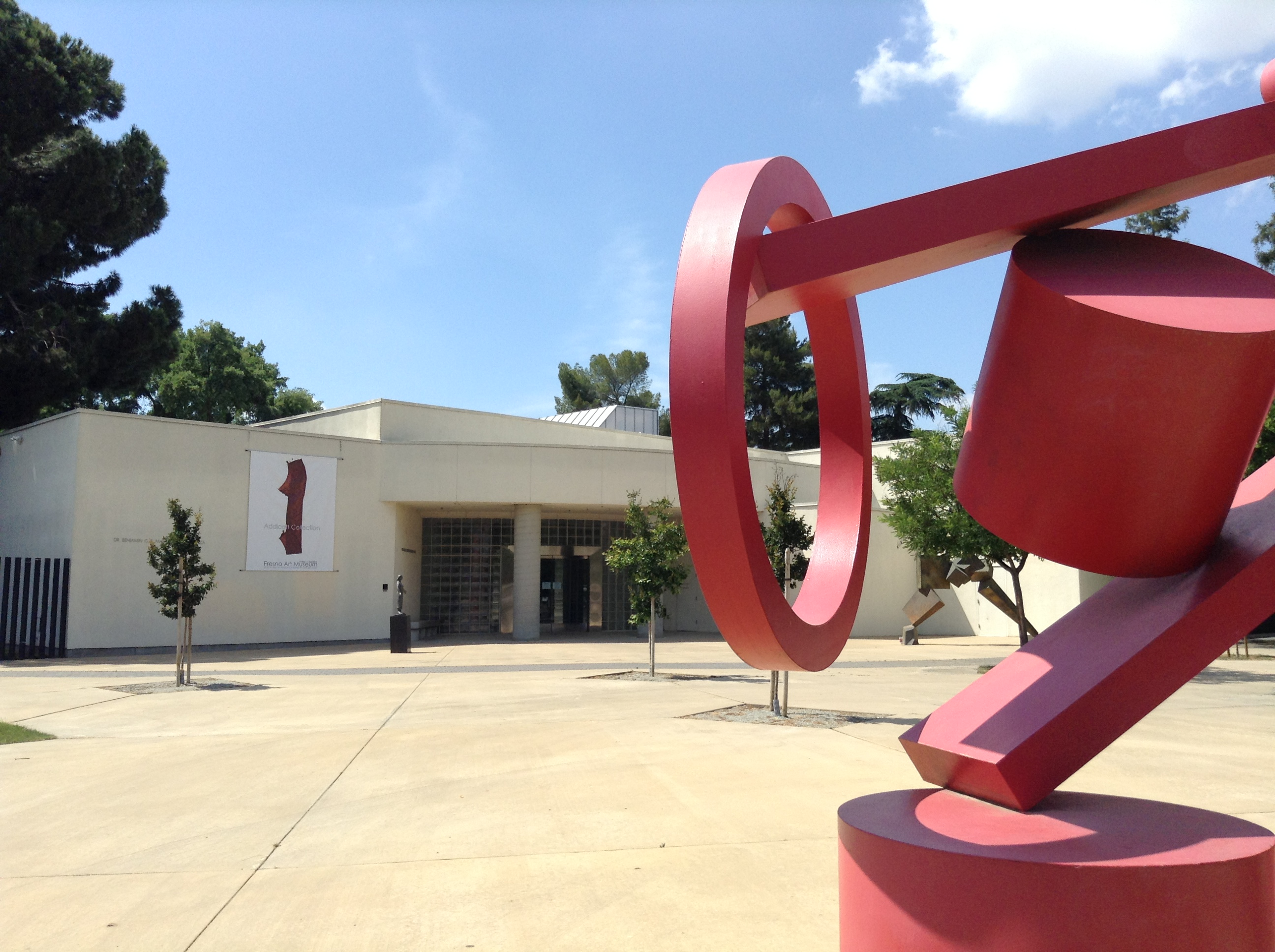
- Former names: Fresno Arts Center (until 1985); Fresno Arts Center and Museum (until 1988)
- Established: 1948; 78 years ago
- Location: 2233 N First St, Fresno, California, United States
- Type: Art museum
- Accreditation: American Association of Museums
- Architect: David Horn
- Website: www.fresnoartmuseum.org

The Fresno Art Museum is an art museum in Fresno, California. The museum's collection includes contemporary art, modern art, Mexican and Mexican-American art, and Pre-Columbian sculptures.

== Mission statement ==
"The Fresno Art Museum offers a dynamic experience for appreciating art. The Museum welcomes, inspires, and educates a diverse regional audience through significant exhibitions, thought-provoking programs, and meaningful interactions with artists and the creative process."

== History ==
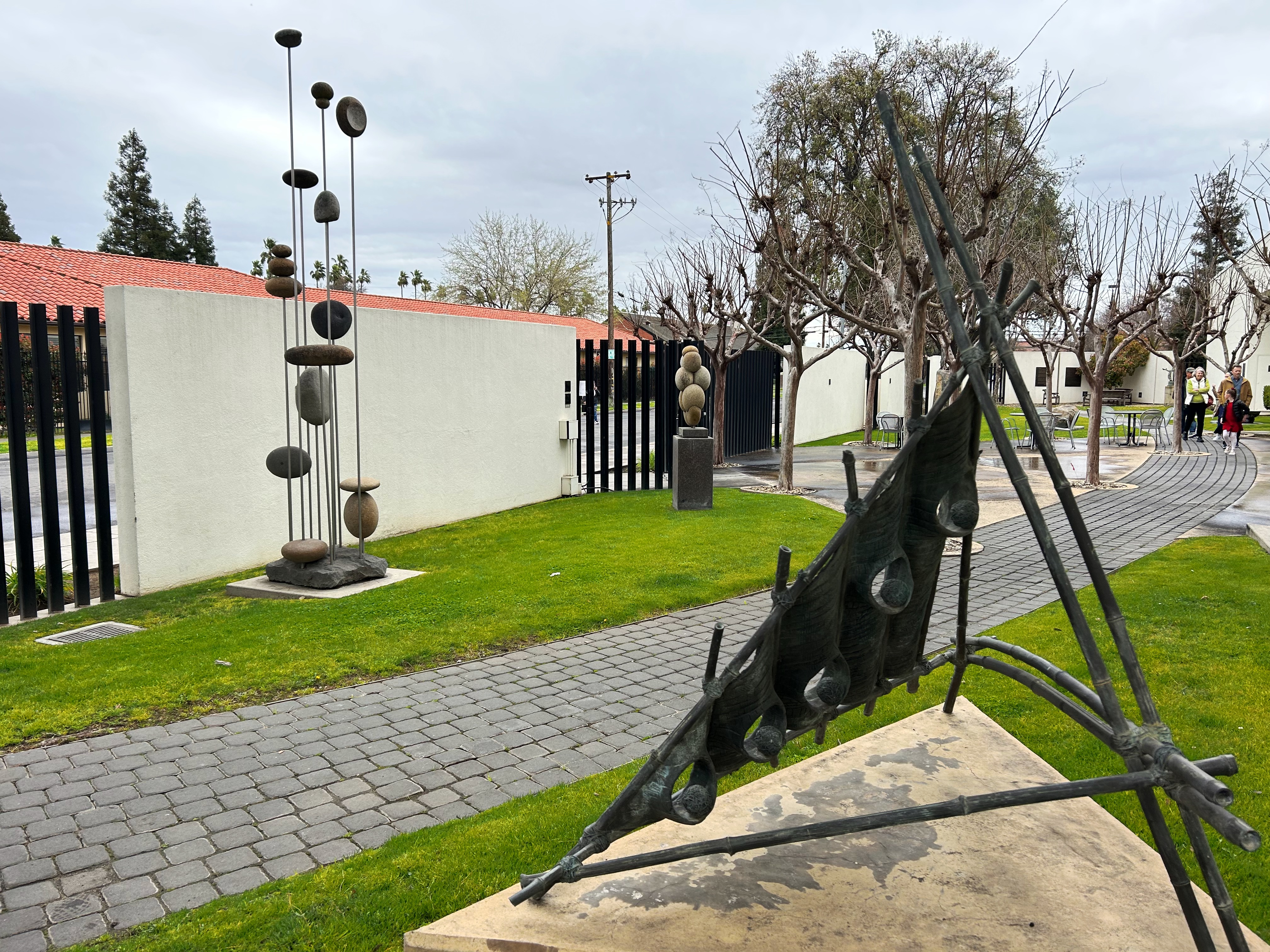
Fresno Art Museum Sculpture Park

The museum traces its history back to the Fresno Art League, a group of local artists that was founded in 1948 and that gathered sufficient community support to incorporate as the Fresno Art Center in 1949. The group established a permanent space to occupy in 1956. With help from Fresno Mayor Gordon Dunn, a historic three-story dwelling called the W. R. Price home was moved to city owned property called "Radio Park" north of downtown Fresno. The city agreed to lease the land for $1 per year and maintains the building exterior and the grounds.

The American Association of Museums granted the Art Center accreditation in 1973. The Museum has continued to maintain its accreditation, most recently being reaccredited in 2016.

In 1985 the Board of Trustees changed the Center's name to Fresno Arts Center and Museum, and then again in 1988 to the Fresno Art Museum. Robert Barrett, the museum's director and curator from 1980 to 1994, was the driving force behind the museum's expansion, collection growth, establishment of an endowment fund, growth in adult education through a partnership with Fresno City College, and even attempted to raise the museum and tourism in an initiative called "Arts to Zoo".

The museum held a successful $2 million funding drive to add a 14,000 square feet (1,300 m^{2}) outdoor gallery of sculptures. Construction began in June 2000.

=== Permanent Collection ===
The Fresno Art Museum's permanent collection preserves and protects over 3,600 works. The main focus of the permanent collection and exhibitions is on modern and contemporary artworks (painting, sculpture, prints, photographs, and other media) from the 20th and 21st centuries, Mesoamerican artifacts from Mexico and the Andes, and modern and folk art of Mexican origin. The Permanent Collection includes works by Ansel Adams, Ruth Asawa, Salvador Dalí, Diego Rivera, Charles Gaines, Robert Cremean, Maynard Dixon, August Madrigal, Clement Renzi, Norman Rockwell, Varaz Samuelian, Andy Warhol, among others.

== Noteworthy artists and exhibitions ==
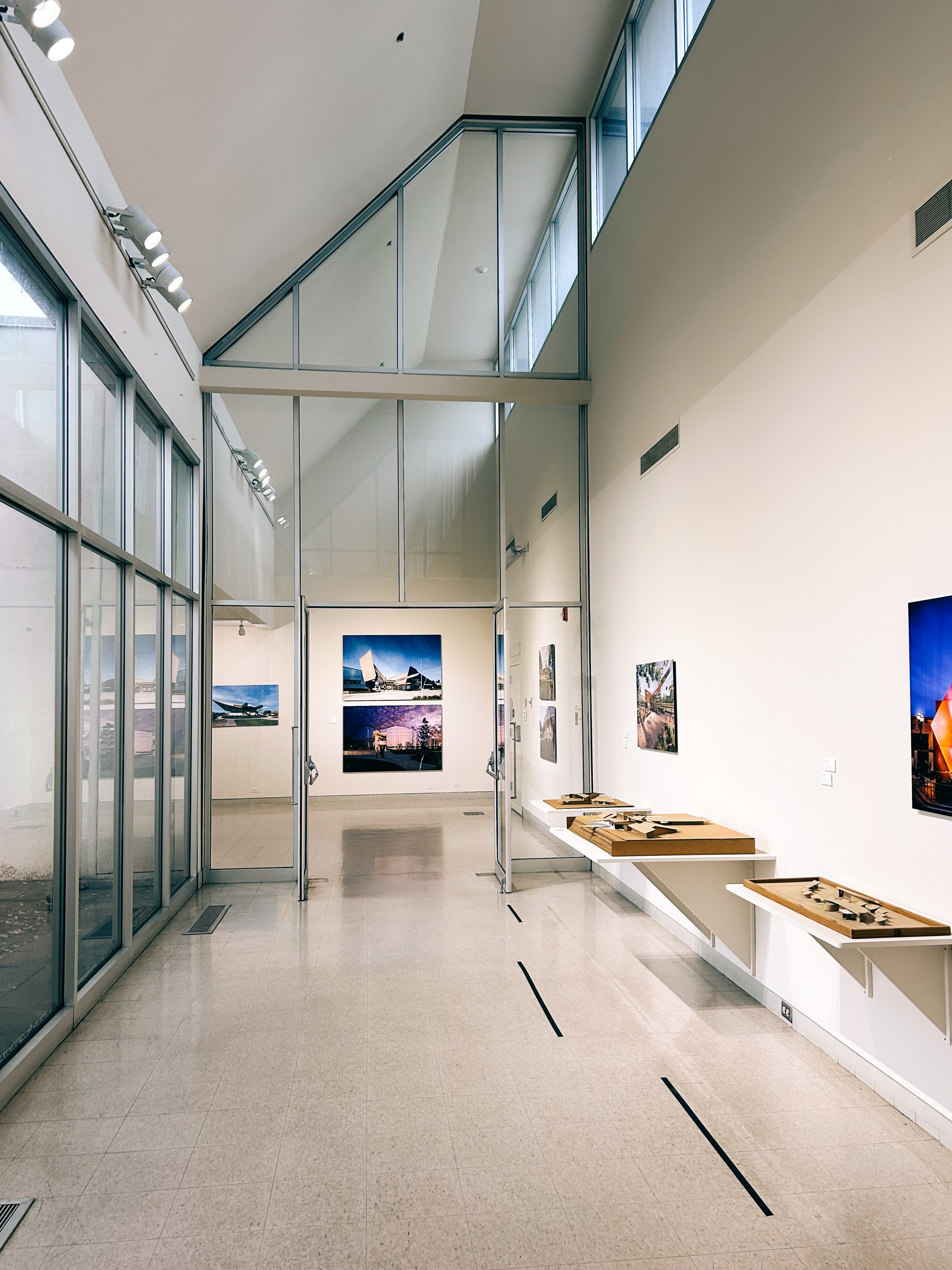
Fresno Art Museum Interior

The Fresno Art Museum became renowned for its exhibitions of Feminist Art going from an unknown "art center" to nationally known with an exhibit of the artist Judy Chicago's The Dinner Party. Judy Chicago brought Fresno's attention to women artists when she taught the first feminist art class in the country at California State University, Fresno.

=== The Council of 100 and the Distinguished Woman Artist Award ===
The Council of 100 presents the Distinguished Woman Artist Award annually to a woman artist who has spent thirty or more years in the studio and has created a unique and prestigious body of work. The Fresno Art Museum was the first museum in the United States to devote a full year of their exhibition schedule 1986/87, exclusively for women artists.

In order to finance the cost of this year of exhibitions, it was necessary to match a grant for $25,000. Robert Barrett, the executive director of the museum, suggested the means to raise the funds; to enlist 100 women from the community, each of whom would donate $250 to the museum for this project. Weekly meetings were scheduled to inform the invited women about the project and their involvement with it. The group would be called the Council of 100. Over one hundred women participated and many of those women continue to support this program today.

Since the spring of 1988, the Fresno Art Museum's Council of 100 has honored the following internationally recognized artists with the annual Distinguished Woman Artist Award and Exhibition:

- 1988 - June Wayne
- 1989 - Helen Lundeberg
- 1990 - Ruth Weisberg
- 1991 - Viola Frey
- 1992 - Inez Johnston
- 1993 - Betye Saar
- 1994 - Rachel Rosenthal
- 1995 - Ruth Bernhard
- 1996 - Bella Feldman
- 1997 - Claire Falkenstein
- 1998 - Jo Hanson
- 1999 - Inez Storer
- 2000 - Angie Bray
- 2001 - Ruth Asawa
- 2002 - Ruth Rippon
- 2003 - Nancy Genn
- 2004 - Olga Seem
- 2005 - Junko Chodos
- 2006 - 20th Anniversary: 18 Profiles
- 2007 - Gwynn Murill
- 2008 - June Schwarcz
- 2009 - Joan Tanner
- 2010 - Kathryn Jacobi
- 2011 - Amalia Mesa-Bains
- 2012 - Arline Fisch
- 2013 - Ann Page
- 2014 - Mildred Howard
- 2015 - Margaret Lazzari
- 2016 - Hung Liu
- 2017 - Joan Schulze
- 2018 - Kay Sekimachi
- 2019 - Heather Wilcoxon
- 2020 - Cancelled due to COVID-19
- 2021 - Cancelled due to COVID-19
- 2022 - Kim Abeles
- 2023 - Martha Casanave

The caliber of these honorees has elevated the status of the Council of 100's Distinguished Woman Artist Award and has brought the Fresno Art Museum national recognition from many organizations including the National Women's Museum in Washington, D.C.

=== Any Given Child ===
In September 2012, the Fresno Unified School District became the tenth national test site for the John F. Kennedy Center's Any Given Child initiative. The purpose of the initiative is to provide a high quality arts education for students K-12 across an entire school district, city government, and local arts community, aided by the Kennedy Center. The Fresno County Office of Education is the governing organization of all schools in Fresno County and facilitates the implementation of this program through its Visual and Performing Arts department. The Fresno Art Museum and the Visual and Performing Arts department have formed a partnership to provide a direct visual arts experience to every third grade student in Fresno Unified. The pilot program was first implemented in spring of 2013, allowing 1,348 third graders to tour the Museum and participate in specially designed curriculum. The 2014-2015 school year saw 6,099 third grade students come through the Museum as part of the Any Given Child Program.

Part of the programming the Any Given Child program is one exhibition that runs for the entire school year, specifically chosen and headed towards the Any Given Child curriculum. The tours include a classroom experience where each child creates an art project based on the theme of the Any Given Child exhibition. There is a reception held near the end of the school year for the students and their families at the Museum to showcase the chosen artworks.
