= Judy Shintani =

Na Omi Judy Shitani is a Japanese American artist working with historical issues

Na Omi Judy Shintani is a Japanese American artist whose work focuses on storytelling and remembrance of people who were imprisoned, her initial focus being Japanese Americans incarcerated during World War II. Shintani is known for creating interactive works about historical issues.

== Early life and education ==
Na Omi Judy Shintani, also known as Judy Shintani, was born in Ames, Iowa. Her father is from Poulsbo, Washington and her mother is from Honolulu, Hawaii. Shintani's father's family had an oyster farming business that was lost in the 1940s when they were taken to Camp Tulelake during World War II. Eventually, Shintani's family ended up settling in the Central Valley of California. It was here that her mother became the first Asian American elementary school teacher in Lodi, California, and her father worked in television broadcasting. Shintani grew up in a small, central valley region, before she moved away to the Bay Area for college.

Shintani has a Bachelor of Science in Graphic Design, from San José State University and a Masters of Transformative Art from John F. Kennedy University, Berkeley.

== Career ==
Shintani is the recipient of many awards. Her work has been exhibited nationwide. She is the founder of the Kitsune Community Art Studio in an old dairy barn in Half Moon Bay, California.

Shintani is a member of the Asian American Women's Artist Caucus, WEAD (Women Eco Artists Directory), and the Northern California Women's Caucus for Art. She is a member of the collective Sansei Granddaughters, a group of five Japanese American women making art about their ancestors' internment during World War II.

Shintani's artwork focuses on remembrance, storytelling, and connection. The assemblages and installations are used to create performances and facilitate social interactive activities that produce stories that shine light on important issues. The subjects of her work are predominantly made up of people who were imprisoned and their memories, along with the thoughts of their families, therefore, Shintani has focused a large part of her career on researching and producing artwork that will give a voice to these internal memories or hidden stories about history. Shintani's career exploration of Japanese American history has expanded to include other cultures whose children have been incarcerated in America. Working with communities is important to Shintani, as she believes that art can lead someone in search of their identity. This community involvement occurs as viewers of Shintani's artwork are encouraged to participate and become art collaborators through interacting with the artwork and providing feedback on their thoughts.

During World War II, President Franklin Roosevelt issued Executive Order 9066, which caused 120,000 mostly Japanese- Americans to be evacuated and imprisoned in 10 incarceration camps. This executive order directly impacted Shintani's family, which is why her work tries to acknowledge repressed emotions, memories, and feelings about this time. As an individual whose family faced this trauma, Shintani considers her art a personal process of transforming and healing for herself and her family. Shintani is working to try and take people beyond the words written in a textbook and look at personal experiences and how to use this material to show how the past connects to what is happening today.

Curator Gail Enns writes about Shintani's work in the exhibition Shadows from the Past, "Na Omi Judy Shintani brings to light injustice and invigorates compassion and connections between many different communities that have been labeled ‘the other’ whenever someone has to be scapegoated during times of economic stress and chaos."

For the exhibition The New Domestic, Gail Enns states, "Judy Shintani uses cultural objects and transforms them to reflect the loosening connection to her ancestry and culture and the dissection of stereotypes. Instead of adorning the body, serving the deconstructed garments become symptoms of a broader social discomfort and represent not only the personal space but also the liminal space where the transformation of tradition, culture, and structure takes place."

The curator for Resilience & Identity, a 2016 solo exhibition at the Peninsula Museum of Art writes, "Shintani’s work addresses the imprisonment of Japanese Americans during World War II, bringing to light memories, repressed emotions, and current feelings about this period in U.S. history. Her unique sculptural pieces include reclaimed wood and barbed wire, illuminated lanterns, deconstructed kimonos and more. Her newest series Illuminations expresses the personal reflections of the Sansei—the generation born to those who were incarcerated. Shintani surveyed them, asking questions such as "How does this history affect your life and what would you like to ask your family members about their experience?" She quickly received over 200 responses. It became apparent that this 3rd generation of Japanese Americans has much to say on the topic."

About Shintani's 2017 exhibition at Springfield College, the William Blizzard gallery director writes, "This exhibition creates space for learning, understanding, and questioning the historical injustice that touched Shintani’s family. During the hysteria of World War II, President Roosevelt issued Executive Order 9066, which resulted in the evacuation of 120,000 mostly Japanese-Americans and their imprisonment in 10 incarceration camps. Shintani's art brings to light memories, repressed emotions, and current feelings about that time. The installation opens a window into those personal feelings and experiences. This exhibit will have interactive components for the viewer. The exhibit is dedicated to Shintani's father, Kazumi Shintani. As a narrator of culture, Shintani focuses on remembrance, connection, and storytelling. She works with whatever best expresses the story: organic and recycled materials, textiles, and ethnic remnants. Shintani often collaborates with the community for understanding and healing."

Dream Refuge for Children Imprisoned was a 2019 solo exhibition at the Triton Museum of Art in Santa Clara, California. The installation comprises life-size drawings of children sleeping in a circle, which is a symbol of healing and inclusion, along with a few children sleeping on the floor in the middle of the circle. The drawings represent Japanese American Concentration Camps during World War II (in which her father is represented); Central American children, who are living at the United States border, separated from their families and imprisoned; and Native American boarding school children, who were taken from their families and denied their culture. In addition to the installation, recordings of stories and personal experiences of individuals who lived through these times are playing in the room. This exhibition was meant to be a healing installation that would shine light on the hard times of incarceration in the United States history.

In 2022 Shitani was invited to curate Tanforan Incarceration 1942; Resilience Behind Barbed Wire. This exhibition is inside the San Bruno BART Station." The exhibit supports a deeper understanding of the impact of the Executive Order 9066 (1942), and the subsequent incarceration during World War II of persons of Japanese descent, specifically those from the Bay Area who were held at the Tanforan Detention Center. The exhibit gives voice to incarceree memories and hidden stories of this time."

== Solo exhibitions ==
- 2014 Healing Adornment, Harbor Gallery, Half Moon Bay, CA
- 2015 Storytelling and Ritual, Santa Fe Internment Camp, Santa Fe Art Institute, Santa Fe, NM
- 2016 Resilience & Identity, Peninsula Museum of Art, Burlingame, CA
- 2017 Stories of Displacement Community Art Project, University of Pittsburgh, Pittsburgh, PA
- 2017 E09066 Then They Came for Us, William Blizzard Gallery, Springfield College, Springfield, MA
- 2017 Shining Light on Remembrance, Ruth's Table, San Francisco, CA
- 2019 Dream Refuge for Children Imprisoned, Triton Museum of Art, Santa Clara, CA

== Awards ==
- 2012 Peninsula Arts Council Diamond Award for Donor sponsor- Coastside Doctors without borders art fundraiser.
- 2014 Asian Pacific Islander Cultural Center Sponsorship Award
- 2014 ISKME Big Ideas Fest Artists in Residence
- 2015 Artist in Residence Santa Fe Art Institute
- 2017 Fellowship, Vermont Center for Art
- 2019 Artist in Residency, San Joaquin Delta College, Stockton, CA
- 2023 California Arts Council Independent Artist Fellowship
