= Women Eco Artists Dialog =

U.S. nonprofit organization

- Formation: 1996
- Founder: Jo Hanson, Susan Leibovitz Steinman and Estelle Akamine
- Founded at: San Francisco, California
- Purpose: Directory of female identified artists and researchers working with environmental and social justice issues
- Website: weadartists.org

Women Eco Artists Dialog (WEAD) is 501(c)(3) non-profit arts organization focused on environmental and social justice art by female identified artists and researchers.

== History ==
WEAD (originally called Women Environmental Artists Directory) was founded in 1996 by Jo Hanson, Estelle Akamine, and Susan Leibovitz Steinman as a printed reference directory for entities interested in finding artists working with environmental issues. Currently the directory takes form as a website with member-managed portfolios. The directory lists a wide variety of activist feminist artists, such as Agnes Denes; Mierle Ukeles; Betsy Damon; Jackie Brookner; Marina DeBris, a trashion artist; Betty Beaumont, often called a pioneer of environmental art; Lauren Elder, Judith Selby Lang; Robin Lasser; Jan Rindfleisch, Shai Zakai and Minoosh Zomorodinia.

WEAD has been listed among the best projects relating to environmental art, and has sponsored a number of exhibits about activist eco art.

Co-founder Jo Hanson was instrumental in founding the San Francisco Recology Artist in Residence Program, located at the San Francisco dump. The WEAD co-founders were featured in a discussion about women artists of the American West whose art was about current social concerns.

== Publications ==
WEAD publishes an annual environmental and social justice magazine which focuses on such topics as dirty water and the legacy of atomic energy. Guest editors have included: Dr. Elizabeth Dougherty, founder of Wholly H2O, and speaker at events such as Pacific Gas and Electric Company conference on water conservation and Tuolumne County's conference on greywater; and Dr. Praba Pilar. Notable magazine contributors and featured artists include Mildred Howard and Linda Weintraub, the author of well known books on art and activism such as To Life!.
