= Zakai =

Zakai or Zakkai (Hebrew: זכאי) is a Hebrew surname. Notable people with the surname include:

- David Zakai (1886 – 1978), member of the Second Aliyah, Hebrew teacher, Histadrut leader, Jewish journalist and publicist
- Johanan ben Zakai, Mishnah rabbi
- Mira Zakai (1942–2019), Israeli contralto
- Moshe Zakai (born 1926), Israeli scientist
- Shafrira Zakai (born 1932), Israeli voice actress and translator
- Shai Zakai
- Shmuel Zakai (born 1963), Israeli general
- Yehezkel Zakai (born 1932), Israeli politician

== See also ==
- Ben Zakkai
- Zakai Zeigler (born 2002), American basketball player
