= Shintani =

- Pronunciation: Shintani

Origin
- Origin: Japanese
- Region of origin: Japanese

Shintani (written: 新谷 lit. new valley ) is a Japanese surname. Notable people with the surname include:

- Judy Shintani, Japanese American artist
- Kaoru Shintani (新谷 かおる; born 1951), Japanese manga artist
- Mayumi Shintani (新谷 真弓; born 1975), Japanese actress and voice actress
- Midori Shintani (薪谷 翠; born 1980), Japanese judo wrestler
- Ryōko Shintani (新谷 良子; born 1981), Japanese voice actress and singer
- Tadahiko Shintani (新谷 忠彦; born 1946), Japanese linguist
- Takuro Shintani (新谷 卓郎; 1943 – 1980), Japanese mathematician
- Terry Shintani (born 1951), American physician, attorney, nutritionist, professor, author, lecturer, radio show host and community advocate in Hawaii
