= Enrique Chagoya =

Mexican-born American painter, printmaker and educator

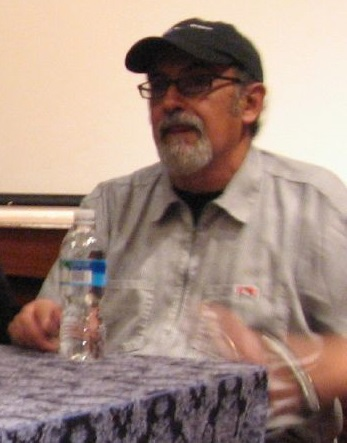
- Enrique Chagoya (2008)
- Born: 1953 (age 72–73); Mexico City, Mexico
- Education: National Autonomous University of Mexico; San Francisco Art Institute; University of California at Berkeley
- Employer: Stanford University
- Spouse(s): Jeanine Kramer, Kara Maria

Enrique Chagoya (born 1953) is a Mexican-born American painter, printmaker, and educator. The subject of his artwork is the changing nature of culture. He frequently uses shocking imagery, irony, and Mesoamerican imagery to convey his points. Chagoya teaches at Stanford University in the department of Art and Art History. He lives in San Francisco.

== Biography ==
Enrique Chagoya was born in Mexico City in 1953. His father, who worked at the Banco de México, taught young Chagoya how to draw. He was instrumental in Chagoya's pursuit of art. His father’s office was filled with forged bank notes and plates, forming almost a museum of forgery. Exposure to this material was Chagoya's first exposure to the concept of appropriation.

Chagoya was partly raised by an Amerindian nurse who helped him to respect the indigenous people of his country and their history. According to Wendy Edelstein, Chagoya "immersed himself in pop culture from both sides of the border, including Spanish translations of North American TV shows ranging from The Lone Ranger to I Love Lucy to The Twilight Zone. And like many boys, the draw of comic books - both American and Mexican - proved irresistible to him."

On June 10, 1971, when Chagoya was in high school, he took part in a student demonstration for rights and reform. A paramilitary group known as Los Halcones (hawks) beat the demonstrators with sticks, shot them, and attacked them with knives, ultimately killing over 120 students, including the wounded in their hospital beds. This violent response became known as the Corpus Christi Massacre. Chagoya barely escaped by leaping over a shop's closing gate. Chagoya says this experience taught him “how dangerous it could be to have a critical mind and how deadly it could be to use my freedom to demonstrate and to use my freedom of expression — rights granted in the Mexican Constitution.”

Chagoya studied economics at the National Autonomous University of Mexico in Mexico City from 1971 to 1974. Its faculty included eminent scholars, including political refugees from Latin American countries. At this time, he also created political cartoons that were published in union newsletters, experience that would be useful in his subsequent career as an artist. As a student, Chagoya was sent to work on rural development projects with a focus on economics, an experience that strengthened his interest in political and social activism. While attending a rural development program he married an American sociologist working on the same program, Jeanine Kramer.

In 1977, Chagoya and his first wife Jeanine Kramer visited McAllen, Texas. He spent time organizing farmworkers in 1978 in the Rio Grande Valley in Texas. In 1979, Chagoya immigrated to the United States to Berkeley with his wife, who needed medical treatment. “I did not emigrate,” he explained, “I was imported.” Chagoya worked as a freelance illustrator and graphic designer. In 1984, he earned a BFA degree at the San Francisco Art Institute; and in 1987 a MFA degree at the University of California at Berkeley. From 1987 to 1990, Chagoya served as the director of San Francisco's Galería de la Raza. He began teaching in 1990.

He received the Stanford University's the Dean's Award in the Humanities in 1998. In 2000, Chagoya became a citizen of the United States. As of 2016, he was a full time professor in the department of Art and Art History at Stanford University.

== Artistic Career ==
One critic called Chagoya "a stupendous draftsman and printmaker... an obsessive scholar and bricolager of Mesoamerican codices... a highly promiscuous mixer of cultures, an up-ender of artistic hierarchies, and a brilliant and caustic political satirist."

Appropriation is a central component of Chagoya's artistic practice. It has been argued that "In our wired era of ubiquitous information and perpetual image bombardment, all of human history, cultural production included, is online and available for plunder: to sample, remix, recycle and repurpose." In this context, Chagoya has been singled out as "a rare artist who can exploit this vast archive to make distinctive works that speak eloquently to our contemporary condition."

=== Large Scale Pastel Series ===
Chagoya was one of the 1,000 artists that joined in the “Artists Call Against U.S. Intervention in Central America” in 1984 in New York, which commemorated a massacre in El Salvador in 1932. Chagoya, who had been an abstract artist in Mexico, considered his large pastel Their Freedom of Expression. The Recovery of Their Economy a political statement rather than an artwork, but it served as the starting point of his career as a political artist.

In the drawing, Chagoya placed President Ronald Reagan's head on a large Mickey Mouse and Henry S. Kissinger's head on a mini-mouse. Together, they paint slogans on a wall with blood derived from butchered corpses, which are partially evident in two bloody buckets. The drawing, which the artist compared to a big “editorial cartoon,” was reproduced in Artforum and other art publications. The 80" x 80" format with its black-and-red color scheme served as a template for other drawings that were featured in Chagoya's MFA exhibition at UC Berkeley, as well as many subsequent artworks.

Double Agent, another large pastel from 1989, features President George H. W. Bush (former Vice President under Ronald Reagan, and C.I.A. director before then) as a mock superman, but his superpowers are utilized to traffic cocaine into the United States, in reference to the Iran-Contra Affair. Other imagery refers to the human victims of his illicit arms sales to Nicaragua.

Nose Job, another pastel from 1989, features an extremely long-nosed, hence "lying" Ronald Reagan with a diminutive body based on Walt Disney's Pinocchio. His companion mini-Pinocchio holds an image of a human ear in a futile effort to hide his donkey ears. Chagoya chose a harmless-looking body to reflect the manner in which politicians, as he put it "represent themselves to the public."

Tribute to Posada, made for a Day of the Dead exhibition in 1989, honors one of Mexico's famous popular artists, who is also a favorite of the artist. Chagoya's small skeletal self-portrait is dwarfed by a monumental one. Both have red eyes.

Chagoya characterizes another large pastel called Civilización y Barbarie (Civilization and Barbarism) from 1992 as a response to several massacres conducted by El Salvador's military dictatorship, which was supported by the United States. Two seated, decapitated bodies are holding their own heads, which rest in plates set on a blood-covered table. The smaller one's hands are nailed to his head. These features refer to an event recounted in a book by Noam Chomsky: a woman discovered her decapitated family members at a table, grasping their own heads; the child's hands were nailed to his head.

A large untitled pastel from 2004 is a commentary on the Iraq war, based on Disney's Snow White and the Seven Dwarfs. All of the figures (mostly from President George W. Bush's cabinet) are small, save for a gigantic Bush, who represents Dopey.

=== Codex Series ===
Works in Chagoya's Codex Series refer to Mesoamerican manuscripts. These take the shape of two forms: "accordion," folded screens created as lithographs, or large sheets, made on amate paper, which was used in pre-Columbian times. Chagoya made his first Codex works around the time of the quincentenary of Christopher Columbus’s first landing in the Americas in 1492.

In 1994's Uprising of the Spirit, a large acrylic and oil on amate paper, (collection of the Los Angeles County Museum of Art), Chagoya pits Superman (who is discarding his pilgrim disguise) against Nezahualcoyotl, the indigenous poet-king of Texcoco. Chagoya's point is that Pilgrims and Spanish Conquistadors were the first North American "illegal aliens," and that contemporary undocumented immigrants in the U.S. should be treated with humanity rather than demonized. This painting is an example of what Chagoya calls Reverse Anthropology, which reverses the coventional colonizer-to-colonized relationship.

The Governor’s Nightmare, from 1994, is a large (48 x 72") acrylic and oil on amate paper painting that refers to the anti-immigrant policies of Governor Pete Wilson of California. Chagoya's source material for this painting was the post-contact cannibal repast illustrated in the Codex Magliabechiano, a mid-16th century work rendered on European paper. In Chagoya's version, Mictlantecuhtli, the Aztec death god, is seated atop a blood-smeared Aztec pyramid. He holds a giant, modern salt shaker, which he used to sprinkle Mickey Mouse, who is bound and served up on a large plate. The severed head of Gov. Wilson in displayed in a food dish.

Another large painting from 1994, called Xenophobic Nightmare in a Foreign Language, an image based on a print of a cannibal barbecue by Theodore de Bry, depicts Gov. Wilson three times.

Chagoya's controversial artwork "The Misadventures of the Romantic Cannibals", is an accordion codex that portrays a female figure with a Christ-like head in a context of suggestive sexual content. It is part of a ten-artist exhibit called "The Legend of Bud Shark and His Indelible Ink," featuring artists for which he served as printer. When it was on display in the Loveland Museum, a city-run art museum in Loveland, Colorado, it (one of a limited edition of 30 lithographs), was the subject of protests. According to the National Coalition Against Censorship (NCAC), some city council members, as well as religious groups and individuals hoped to have Chagoya's artwork removed. The NCAC defended the work's exhibition on First Amendment grounds. The work was not censored by the museum, but it was destroyed by Kathleen Folden, 56, a truck driver who drove to Loveland from Kalispell, Montana specifically to destroy the artwork. On October 6, 2010, she used the crowbar to smash the case that enclosed it, before tearing the artwork. According to the artist the work is a commentary on the Catholic sex abuse cases. The woman went to court on October 15, 2010. Folden was ordered to pay $2,991 in restitution. The vandalized artwork was not replaced, to the artist's regret.

After Jonathan Wiggins, the pastor of the Resurrection Fellowship Church, emailed Chagoya, the artist created a "loving" portrait of Jesus for his church, which was unveiled to the congregation with applause.

'Liberty Club in the Sky', (2005) hard ground and spit bite aquatint and etching with drypoint by Chagoya

Another controversial artwork includes "The Enlightened Savage Guide to Economic Theory" (2009–10). This artwork includes imagery of murdered children, suspended from meat hooks, in a scene reminiscent of a butcher shop. In addition, this work includes two monstrous figures fighting, one with the head of George Washington and the other with the head of Saddam Hussein, referencing Middle Eastern conflicts over oil. This codex-inspired work is done on handmade amate paper. The use of cannibalism is shocking, but draw attention to present-day social issues such as cultural appropriation and the barbarism that often accompanies.

Chagoya contributed a chapter dedicated to sign systems in indigenous codices in the catalogue to the 2001 exhibition The Road to Aztlán, organized by the Los Angeles County Museum of Art.

=== Prints ===
Chagoya's two favorite printmakers are the Spaniard Francisco Goya and the Mexican José Guadalupe Posada. He describes them as the originators of modernism. Though their lives did not overlap, he brought them together in a print called Goya Meets Posada (Goya conoce a Posada). The artists are shaking hands, accompanied by imagery from two of their most famous prints. The character known as Catrina, originated by Posada, stands between them, while bulls fall from the sky (a reference to a Goya print known as the "Rain of Bulls"). Chagoya depicts himself as child skating by, in the lover right of the image.

Chagoya has transformed more than 30 of Goya's prints. According to some commentators, his works shows the relevance of Goya to our times, and sometimes the fewest changes he makes result in the most powerful works. Chagoya's first homage to Goya, Contra el bien general (Against the common good), illustrated below, was made in 1983, during his time as an undergraduate at the Art Institute of San Francisco. In this work, Chagoya substituted Ronald Reagan's head for that of a scribe that had bat wings instead of ears.

The print Grande el Sombrero from 2012 refers to a Spanish expression that means “big shoes to fill.” Chagoya inserts his own greatly undersized head into a Goya self-portrait, seemingly demonstrating his own inadequacy.

=== Paintings ===
Chagoya's 5-foot-by-7-foot painting of Jesus, a resurrected figure floating in a white robe that holds a banner with a single word: "love," was gifted by the artist to the Resurrection Fellowship in Loveland, Colorado in 2011. According to Chagoya, the painting was received by the congregation with a standing ovation.

Chagoya’s Bathroom Painting of 2018 depicts President Donald Trump in a surreal manner that has been described as "a monstrous Salvador Dalí-like hemorrhoid head (replete with pustules and varicose veins) emerging from a knobby buttock-neck."

'Against the Common Good II' (1983), etching and aquatint by Chagoya

His work often includes political themes that are developed using subversion and wit to convey the message. One work that exemplifies this political leaning is “Detention at the Border of Language” (2023). This painting utilizes various effects, such as a visual glitch, pop culture figures, and historical abstract elements. The larger than life Mayan mask dominates the focal point of the piece, leading to a sense of dominance by indigenous culture over the painting. This painting depicts three Native Americans, who are in the process of abducting a feminine Donald Duck character. Donald Duck likely serves as an allusion to former President Donald Trump. The Native Americans are in a canoe named "Border Patrol". This is an inversion of the traditional understanding of Border Patrol and immigration, and creates a political statement.

== Awards ==
In 2021, Chagoya was awarded the Guggenheim Foundation Fellowship.

In 2021, Chagoya was entered into the National Academy of Design, NYC.

He is the recipient of a Tiffany Fellowship.

== Exhibitions ==
=== 2019 ===
- Everyone is an Alienígeno at Florida Gulf Coast University Art Gallery, Fort Meyers, FL. Solo exhibition.
- Detention at the Border of Language at the Coulter Gallery, Department of Art and Art History, Stanford University, Stanford, CA. Solo exhibition.
- Eye to I: Selfportraits From 1900 to Today at Smithsonian National Portrait Gallery. Group exhibition.

=== 2020 ===
- Detention at the Border of Language at the Triton Museum in Santa Clara, CA. Solo exhibition
- The Seven Deadly Sins/Utopías Coloniales at Anglimh/Trimble Gallery in San Francisco, CA. Solo exhibition.
- (Re)Print: Five Print Projects at the International Print Center in New York, NY. Group virtual exhibition.

=== 2021 ===
- Double Trouble at Sonoma Valley Museum of Art. Collaboration with artist Kara Maria.
- Printing the Revolution! At the Smithsonian Museum of American Art in Washington. Group exhibition.

=== 2022 ===
- Detention at the Border of Language at Edgewood College Gallery in Madison, WI.

=== 2024 ===
- Xican-a.o.x. Body, Pérez Art Museum Miami, Florida

== Collections ==
- Santa Barbara Museum of Art
- Honolulu Museum of Art
- Los Angeles County Museum of Art
- Metropolitan Museum of Art
- di Rosa
- Museum of Modern Art
- Museum of Sonoma County
- National Museum of American Art
- San Francisco Museum of Modern Art
- Brooklyn Museum
- New York Public Library
- San Jose Museum of Art
- Art Institute of Chicago
- Arkansas Arts Center
- Whitney Museum of American Art
- Williams College Museum of Art
- Crocker Art Museum
- Fine Arts Museums of San Francisco.
