= Nancy Genn =

American artist

- Born: 1929 (age 96–97); San Francisco
- Education: University of California, Berkeley
- Website: www.nancygenn.com

Nancy Genn is an American artist living and working in Berkeley, California known for works in a variety of media, including paintings, bronze sculpture, printmaking, and handmade paper rooted in the Japanese washi paper making tradition. Her work explores geometric abstraction, non-objective form, and calligraphic mark making, and features light, landscape, water, and architecture motifs. She is influenced by her extensive travels, and Asian craft, aesthetics and spiritual traditions.

== Early life and education ==
Nancy Genn was born in 1929 in San Francisco, California. She recognized early that she would pursue a career as an artist. Her mother, Ruth Wetmore Thompson Whitehouse, was a painter and UC Berkeley alumna who played a leadership role in the San Francisco Women Artists organization. Genn studied at San Francisco Art Institute (then California School of Fine Arts) with painter Hassel Smith, and at the Art Department at the University of California, Berkeley (1948–49) with Professors Margaret Peterson and John Haley, and fellow students Sam Francis and Sonya Rapoport. In 1949 she married Vernon “Tom” Genn, an engineer raised in Japan, with whom she had three children.

== Career ==
Genn's first noted solo exhibition was in 1955 at Gump's Gallery in San Francisco. She received international recognition through her inclusion in French art critic Michel Tapié’s seminal text Morphologie Autre (1960), which cited her as one of the most important exponents of post-war informal art.

In 1961, Genn began creating bronze sculptures using the lost-wax casting method. Influenced by noted sculptor and family friend Claire Falkenstein, who used open-formed structures in her work, Genn cast forms woven from long grape vine cuttings, and produced vessels, fountains, fire screens, a menorah, a lectern, and, notably, the Cowell Fountain (1966) at UC Santa Cruz. In 1963 her sculptural work was exhibited with Berkeley artists Peter Voulkos and Harold Paris in the influential exhibition Creative Casting curated by Paul J. Smith at the Museum of Contemporary Crafts, New York.

Genn was one of the first American artists to express herself through handmade paper, first receiving wide recognition via exhibitions at Susan Caldwell Gallery, New York, beginning in 1977, and in traveling exhibitions with Robert Rauschenberg and Sam Francis. In 1978-1979, supported by the National Endowment for the Arts and Japan Creative Arts Fellowship, she studied papermaking in Japan, visiting local paper craftspeople, working in Shikenjo studio in Saitama Prefecture, and exhibiting her work in Tokyo. She also learned techniques from Donald Farnsworth of Magnolia Editions, Oakland. She is recognized for the layering and dimensionality of her paper works, achieved through her original tearing technique, known as the ”Genn method.”

Beginning in 1989, Genn shifted focus and began her Planes of Light series of abstract, layered, light-filled paintings and works on paper inspired by architecture and sacred spaces. This work uses asymmetrical abstract planes to suggest architectonic spaces and incorporates collaged fragments of maps and undecipherable scripts. Meanwhile, she continued to make use of a wide variety of media including gouache, casein, mono-printing, vitreography, collage, and ceramics.

Retrospectives of Genn's work include Planes of Light (2003) at the Fresno Art Museum, CA and the extensive exhibition Architecture from Within (2018) at Palazzo Ferro Fini, Venice, Italy, which included an illustrated monograph by curator Francesca Valente. She shows with Marignana Arte Gallery in Venice, Italy.

== Selected solo exhibitions ==
Genn's solo exhibitions include:

- 2023: Nancy Genn: A Painting Survey, Works from the Late 1950s through 2023, David Richard Gallery, New York, NY
- 2023: Nancy Genn : Beyond the Grid, Palazzo Collicola, Spoleto, Italy
- 2022: Nancy Genn : Handmade Paper 1981-1988, Marignana Arte, Venice, Italy
- 2021: Inner Landscapes, Marignana Arte, Venice, Italy
- 2020: Consonance, Space Mater Gallery, Todi, Italy
- 2019: Museo di Ca’ Pesaro, Galleria Internazionale d’ Arte Moderna, Venice, Italy
- 2018: Architecture from Within, Palazzo Ferro Fini, Venice, Italy
- 2016: Waterfalls, Vessel Gallery, Oakland, CA
- 2003: Fresno Art Museum, Fresno, CA, curated by Jacquelin Pillar
- 1999: Mills College Art Museum, Oakland, CA, curated by Catherine Crum
- 1984: Andrew Crispo Gallery, New York, NY
- 1983: Kala Art Institute, Berkeley, CA
- 1981, 79, 77: Susan Caldwell Gallery, New York, NY
- 1980: Inoue Gallery, Tokyo, Japan
- 1976: John Bolles Gallery, San Francisco, CA
- 1976: Los Angeles Institute of Contemporary Art, Los Angeles, CA
- 1971: Oakland Museum of California, Oakland, CA
- 1970: Richmond Art Center, Richmond, CA
- 1966: Cowell College Gallery, UC Santa Cruz, Santa Cruz, CA
- 1963: M. H. de Young Memorial Museum, San Francisco, CA
- 1961: San Francisco Museum of Modern Art, San Francisco, CA
- 1960: David Cole Gallery, San Francisco, CA
- 1955: Gump's Gallery, San Francisco, CA

== Selected group exhibitions ==
Genn's work has been included in the following group exhibitions:

- 2023: West Coast Women of Abstract Expressionism, Berry Campbell Gallery, New York, NY
- 2023: Painting of the Edges of America since the 1950s: Five Bay Area Women Painters, David Richard Gallery, NY
- 2022: Poetry is not a Luxury, Minnesota Center for Book Arts, Minneapolis, MN
- 2022: The Most Beautiful Mistake You Can Make, Carl Cherry Center for the Arts, Carmel, CA.
- 2020: Poetry is not a Luxury, San Francisco Center for the Book, San Francisco, CA
- 2020: Breakfast Group, Carl Cherry Center for the Arts, Carmel, CA
- 2019: Ideal-Types Chapter 2, Marignana Arte, Venice, Italy
- 2019: Poetry is not a Luxury, Center for Book Arts, New York
- 2018: W.W.W. What Walls Want, Marignana Arte, Venice, Italy
- 2017: Waterlines, New Museum, Los Gatos, CA
- 2014: Breakfast Group, Richmond Art Center, Richmond, CA
- 2010: Prints Byte; The Cutting Edge of Printmaking, SOMARTS Gallery, San Francisco, CA
- 2006: Reflections on a Legacy: Vitreographs from Littleton Studios, Turchin Center for the Visual Arts, Boone, NC
- 2006: Magnolia Editions: Woven Transcriptions, Fresno Art Museum, Fresno, California
- 2002: Five Women Artists: Four Generations, One Family, DL Gallery, Seoul, South Korea
- 1982: Making Paper, American Craft Museum (traveling exhibition)
- 1982: New American Paperworks, curated by Jane M. Farmer, University of Houston (traveling exhibition)
- 1982: Elegant Miniatures from San Francisco and Japan, Kyoto, Japan and San Francisco, CA
- 1983: Seoul/San Francisco: Prints and Drawings, National Museum of Modern and Contemporary Art, Seoul, Korea
- 1973: San Francisco Printmakers, Cincinnati Art Museum, Cincinnati, Ohio
- 1971: Contemporary American Prints and Drawings, San Francisco Museum of Art, San Francisco, CA
- 1965: Art in Religion, Museum West, San Francisco, CA
- 1963: New Images of San Francisco, M. H. de Young Memorial Museum, San Francisco, CA
- 1963: Creative Casting, curated by Paul J. Smith, Museum of Contemporary Crafts, NY
- 1963: Images of Woman, Oakland Museum of California, Oakland, CA
- 1960: Winter Invitational, California Palace of the Legion of Honor, San Francisco, CA
- 1955: Twentieth Century Drawings, Stanford Art Gallery, Stanford University, Stanford, CA

== Awards ==
Genn has received the following awards:

- Council of 100 Distinguished Woman Artist Award, 2003
- Visiting Artist American Academy in Rome, 1989,1994, 2014
- United States/Japan Creative Arts Fellowship, Japan-United States Friendship Commission, 1978-1979
- HUD Award for Design Excellence, U.S. Dept. of Housing and Urban Development, 1968
- Phelan Award, De Young Museum, San Francisco, 1963
- Ellen Hart Bransten Award, San Francisco Women Artists, 1952

== Collections ==
Genn is represented in the following collections:

- Achenbach Foundation, California Palace of the Legion of Honor, San Francisco, CA
- Albright-Knox Art Gallery, Buffalo, NY
- American Craft Museum, New York, NY
- Brooklyn Museum, Brooklyn, NY
- Berkeley Art Museum and Pacific Film Archive, Berkeley, CA
- Crocker Art Museum, Sacramento, CA
- Fondazione Georgio Cini, Venice, Italy
- Fresno Art Museum, Fresno, CA
- International Center of Aesthetic Research, Italy
- Library of Congress, Washington, DC
- Los Angeles County Museum of Art, CA
- Mills College Art Museum, Oakland, CA
- Museum of Modern Art, New York, New York, NY
- Museo di Ca’ Pesaro, Venice, Italy
- New York Public Library, New York, NY
- New York University Art Collection, NY
- Oakland Museum of California, Oakland, CA
- Palazzo Ferro Fini, Venice, Italy
- San Francisco Museum of Modern Art, CA
- Smithsonian American Art Museum, Washington, DC
