= Ben Zakkai =

Ben Zakkai, sometimes ben Zaccai, ben Zakkay, etc. (Hebrew: בֶּן זַכַּאי, literally "son of Zakkai" is a Hebrew patronymic and surname. Notable people with the name include:

- David ben Zakkai (died 940 CE) was an exilarch, leader of the Jewish community of Babylon
- Talila Levi Ben-Zakkai (1930–2023), Israeli theater actress, journalist and screenwriter
- Yohanan Ben Zakkai (1st century CE), tanna, an important Jewish sage during the late Second Temple period

== See also ==
- Zakai
