= Kara Maria =

American visual artist

- Born: Kara Maria Sloat; 1968 (age 56–57); Binghamton, New York, US
- Education: University of California, Berkeley
- Known for: Painting, works on paper, printmaking
- Spouse: Enrique Chagoya
- Awards: Artadia Award, University of California, Berkeley Eisner Prize
- Website: Kara Maria

Kara Maria, The Sea, The Sky, The You and I, (blue whale), acrylic on canvas, 26" x 26", 2021.

Kara Maria (born 1968), née Kara Maria Sloat, is a San Francisco-based visual artist known for paintings, works on paper and printmaking. Her vivid, multi-layered paintings have been described as collages or mash-ups of contemporary art vocabularies, fusing a wide range of abstract mark-making with Pop art strategies of realism, comic-book forms, and appropriation. Her work outwardly conveys a sense of playfulness and humor that gives way to explicit or subtle examinations—sometimes described as "cheerfully apocalyptic"—of issues including ecological collapse, diminishing biodiversity, military violence and the sexual exploitation of women. In a 2021 review, Squarecylinder critic Jaimie Baron wrote, "Maria’s paintings must be read as satires [that] recognize the absurdities of our era … These pretty, playful paintings are indictments, epitaphs-to-be."

Maria has exhibited at venues including the Contemporary Arts Museum Houston, de Saisset Museum, Nevada Museum of Art, and Sonoma Valley Museum of Art. Her work belongs to the public art collections of the Fine Arts Museums of San Francisco, Berkeley Art Museum and Pacific Film Archive, and San Jose Museum of Art, among others. She is married to artist Enrique Chagoya.

== Education and career ==
Kara Maria Sloat was born in 1968 in Binghamton, New York. She moved to San Francisco in 1990 to attend the University of California, Berkeley, earning a BA in 1993, followed by an MFA in 1998, both in art practice.

After graduating, Maria began to exhibit her work, gaining wider recognition in the early 2000s with appearances in group shows at the Contemporary Arts Museum Houston, Katonah Museum of Art, and Oakland Museum of California, among other venues. Following initial solo shows at Patricia Sweetow (San Francisco, 1998) and Cité internationale des arts (Paris, 1999), she began exhibiting at Catharine Clark Gallery (San Francisco), where she had five solo shows between 2001 and 2018. In her later career, she has had solo exhibitions at Recology (2015), Anglim/Trimble Gallery (2021), Sonoma Valley Museum of Art (2021) and the de Saisset Museum (2022), as well as two surveys, "Head Over Heels" (2016, California State University, Chico) and "Rhapsody" (2022, Museo Italo Americano).

In addition to her artmaking, Maria has taught at California College of the Arts, University of California, Berkeley and San Francisco State University.

== Work and reception ==
Maria's art draws on diverse art historical influences—various modes of abstraction, Pop art, Japanese woodblock prints—as well as the formative 1970s pop culture of her youth, including comic books and artistic toys such as Lite-Brite, Spirograph and Colorforms. Her work arose in the aftermath of the 1980s and 1990s postmodern ethos of mixing styles—in her case, those of artists Jackson Pollock, Ellsworth Kelly, Roy Lichtenstein, Philip Guston, Gerhard Richter and Sigmar Polke have been cited. However, writers suggest that unlike postmodern artists, Maria does not use a pastiche of styles ironically or self-referentially, but rather employs them like distinct notes in music—formal tools that are temporally co-existent and equally relevant. Curator Kelly Lindner described Maria's work as a "cacophony of symbols, motifs and painterly gestures" tethered to socio-political concerns by interjections of detailed, realistic imagery. She noted, "Maria's pluralistic approach to abstraction offers a counterpoint to time specificity … a painting style no longer necessarily represents a particular time period."

Kara Maria, Un Jeu, acrylic on canvas, 39" x 51", 1999.

=== Work (1998–2013) ===
Maria's early, largely abstract works were described by San Francisco Chronicle critic Kenneth Baker as "post-Pop Art" with color field painting titles (e.g., Pink/Green, 1998) that "packed comic-strip explosions and speed lines into otherwise elegant color patterns." With paintings such as Boom and Un Jeu (both 1999), she began moving toward more raucous palettes, graphic, cartoon-like representations, and cultural and social commentary. For example, the pink, orange and purple Boom juxtaposed the title exclamation, bursts and smoke trails with stars inscribed with white line drawings of women's hands and genitals and a phallic lavender missile; Un Jeu was a multilayered work incorporating a television interruption pattern, looping arabesques, silhouettes of rabbits and pistols, and black dots suggesting either droppings or ammunition pellets. In a different series, Maria—then a vegetarian—depicted cuts of meat based on grocery store flyer imagery, including a deck of nudie cards in which she replaced women's torsos with slabs of meat.

In subsequent work, presented in the solo exhibitions "Paradise Lost" (2007) and "Dystopia" (2008), she shifted to detailed, realistic renderings of emotionally charged figures and objects that often dominated backdrops featuring assorted abstract and Pop art gestures. These paintings uncomfortably merged war iconography (soldiers, fighter jets, camouflage patterns and references to the Abu Ghraib torture scandal), the palpable flesh of pornography, and consumer culture imagery (e.g., Gas Pump, 2007) to visceral effect. The painting Hot and Bothered (2007) juxtaposed a decorative mandala alongside pink, purple and white Richter-like squeegee pulls of paint, from under which soldiers bearing weapons and provocatively posed nude women peeked out, creating a candy-coated, even playing field conflating military violence with the sexual exploitation of women. In a review of the "Dystopia" show, the San Francisco Chronicle's Reyhan Harmanci wrote, "The energy in her paintings is intense: Maria has pushed the meeting of naked women and instruments of war past comfort, and the images can shock." In her exhibitions "Inviting the Storm" (2009) and "Artwarpornica" (2012), Maria expanded upon these themes, introducing concern for the state of the environment into the work.

=== Environmental and endangered species-related work ===
Kara Maria, So Solve the Mystic Sun, (ocelot), acrylic on canvas, 60" x 60", 2017.

In 2014, Maria was an artist-in-residence at Recology—the City of San Francisco dump—where she was challenged to create a body of work using only discarded materials. Scavenging canvases and mass-produced artworks and overpainting them with recycled acrylic paint, she discovered a new theme. She embedded carefully rendered portraits of animals that inhabited or passed through the site (e.g., seagulls, raccoons, hawks) into brightly colored compositions of disjointed, swirling abstract forms that conveyed the constantly churning, tumultuous quality of the facility. The paintings mixed playfulness with a more somber awareness of neglect, displacement and peril—expressed by seemingly unaware creatures directly gazing out from the canvas—that spoke to the interconnection of humans, animals and habitats through consumption and waste. She extended these works to include a wider range of animals (e.g., primates, rhinos, bats and leopards) and painterly gesture (starburst explosions, spiraling vapor trails, hard-edged quasi-cubist spaces, paint smears and Lichtenstein-like dots and stripes) in the exhibition "Haywire" (2015), which was likened in a review to a pop surrealist requiem over "dystopian resignation."

In her exhibitions "Post-Nature" (2018), "Regarding Extinction" (2021) and "Precious and Precarious" (2022), these paintings evolved into miniature, Audubon-like depictions of lone endangered-species animals from around the world, in part inspired by Elizabeth Kolbert’s book The Sixth Extinction: An Unnatural History (2014), which detailed a contemporary, projected species loss unequaled since the dinosaur extinction. These creatures were often barely visible amid what David M. Roth described as "gonzo-poetic abstract landscapes—pastiches of gestural abstraction, Pop Art, action-comic iconography and natural history rendered in retina-tingling colors—[that] are meticulously crafted exercises in well-ordered chaos." Among the species depicted were the polar bear (Not Fade Away, 2014), wide-eyed primates (Mayday (tarsier), 2017), bees lost among geometric shapes, gestural marks and an assault weapon (Trump’s Bee, 2017), and whooping cranes fending off abstract paint smears and SUVs (An Exercise of Freedom, 2018). The Sea, The Sky, The You And I (Blue Whale) (2021) depicted a whale floating on a tie-dye-like canvas suggesting the depths of the ocean, but showered with fireworks-like, Op art-ish blue, purple and magenta dots.

Writers have noted in these works a clear visual metaphor of restrained versus feral: disarmingly unperturbed animals rendered with great control that serve as calm, still points dominated by and dwarfed within decidedly unnatural, heterogeneous abstract tangles. They suggest that the jolting disparity conveys not only a sense of habitats stripped of all familiar markers—and of the low priority humans place on animals—but also hint at an AI-influenced future of nature under siege and hopelessly degraded. David Roth contended that the scenes of catastrophic disarray made viewers witnesses if not accomplices and "functioned as fire-breathing polemics, arguments against the fiction that life can exist apart from or outside of nature." Jaimie Baron wrote, "Maria’s vibrant works serve as a weirdly joyful and kinetic rendition of this impending animal death, perhaps akin to the second line in a New Orleans jazz funeral."

== Collections and awards ==
Maria's work belongs to the public art collections of the Berkeley Art Museum and Pacific Film Archive, Cantor Arts Center, Crocker Art Museum, de Saisset Museum, di Rosa Center for Contemporary Art, Fine Arts Museums of San Francisco, Mills College Art Museum, Museo Italo Americano, Nevada Museum of Art, and San Jose Museum of Art, among others.

She has been awarded residencies at the de Young Museum, Djerassi, Headlands Center for the Arts, Montalvo Arts Center and Recology. She has received awards and grants from Artadia (2001), SF Weekly (Masterminds Grant, 2008), and the University of California, Berkeley (Eisner Prize in Art, 1997). In 2020, she was invited as a guest artist for the "Los Angeles Billboard Show" organized by The Billboard Creative, and has been commissioned to create public artworks for San Francisco General Hospital and the San Francisco Arts Commission.
