= Nightingale House =

Coordinates: 37.77177°N 122.42718°W

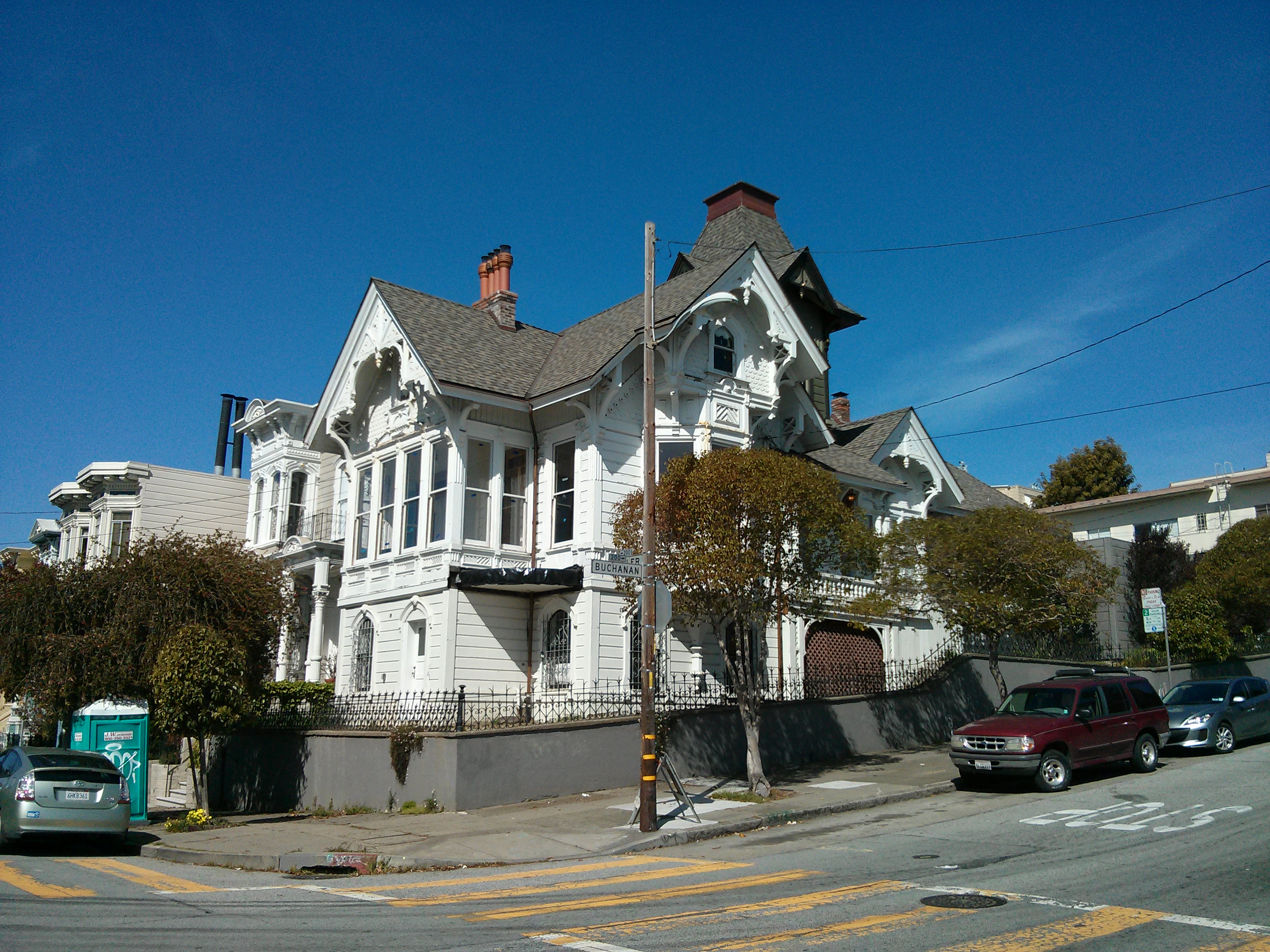
- Nightingale House under renovation

- Location within San Francisco County

General information
- Type: House
- Location: 201 Buchanan Street; San Francisco, California
- Completed: 1882

Design and construction
- Architect: John Marquis

San Francisco Designated Landmark
- Designated: 19 April 1972
- Reference no.: 47

The Nightingale House is a Victorian era Queen Anne and Eastlake style house, located at 201 Buchanan Street in San Francisco, California, United States.

== History ==
The 4400 square foot home was designed by architect John Marquis and built in 1882. The name comes from its original owner, John Nightingale (1823–1912). The structure was designated as a San Francisco landmark in October 1972.

Notably the last resident of this house was San Francisco Arts Commissioner and San Francisco artist Jo Hanson, who died March 13, 2007.

== See also ==
- List of San Francisco Designated Landmarks
- Lower Haight neighborhood
