= Junko Chodos =

Japanese-American artist (born 1939)

- Born: Junko Takahashi; 1939 (age 86–87); Tokyo, Japan
- Education: Waseda University & State University of New York
- Known for: Fine art
- Movement: Centripetal Art
- Website: www.junkochodos.com

Junko Chodos (born 1939) is a contemporary artist born and educated in Japan and residing in the United States since 1968. Her works represent a wide variety of techniques and styles, ranging from pencil, pen, and collage, to works done with acrylic.

Chodos has had solo exhibitions featured at the Tokyo Central Museum, the Long Beach Museum of Art, the USC Pacific Asia Museum, the Fresno Art Museum, the Museum of Contemporary Religious Art in St. Louis, and numerous other museums and galleries in Japan and in the United States.

== Life and career ==
Junko Chodos was born Junko Takahashi in Tokyo, Japan, in 1939. Her experience during World War II affected her later life and art. She grew up in a household where Shinto, Buddhism and Christianity were strong influences. She was a member of the first post-war generation of "commoners" allowed to attend the Gakushūin, the Imperial school.

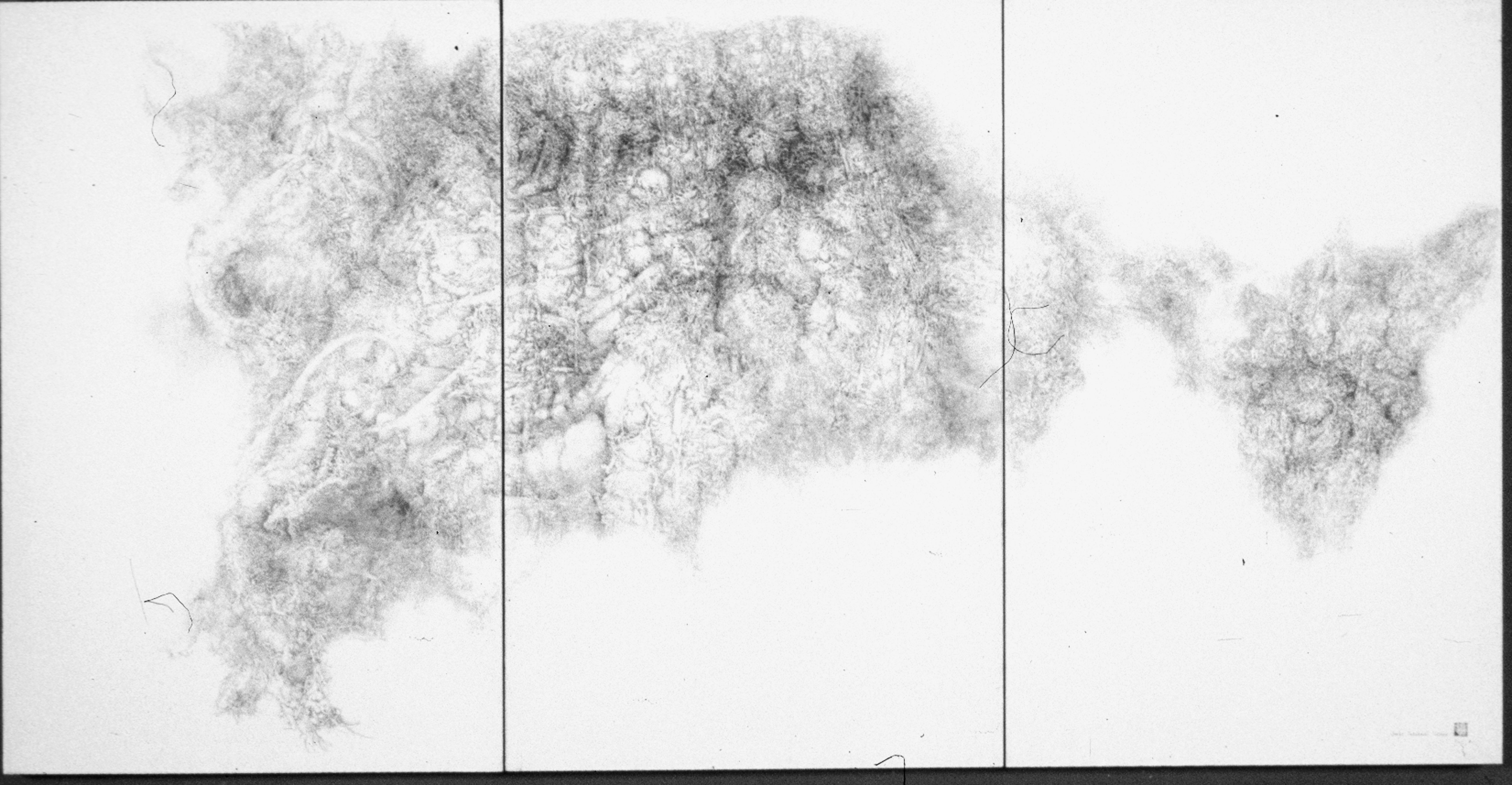
Dead Flower Series, No. 8, Byoobu, Pen-and-ink with wash. Permanent Collection of the Pacific Asia Museum.

Chodos studied at Tokyo's Waseda University from 1963-1968. She graduated with a BA in Art History and Philosophy. At Waseda, she studied under Professor Shigeo Ueda, noted translator of Martin Buber into Japanese, and took an interest in his writings of philosophy.

After leaving Japan in 1968, Chodos migrated to California, calling herself a "spiritual refugee". She then attended the State University of New York, Buffalo. Later, in 1971 she married Rafael Chodos, a lawyer and author in biblical studies and the aesthetics of fine art.

In an article in the Winter 2003 issue of CrossCurrents, Chodos wrote:

To seek justice, to be courageous, to be ethical in other words, to choose rational universal standards over loyalty towards the group is to be a traitor in Japan, and these individuals break the biggest taboos of the totalitarian society. I experienced these aspects of Japanese society as a form of persecution and as a threat to my own integrity. That is why I left Japan and became a spiritual refugee.

As Junko Chodos developed her style. she coined the term Centripetal Art to describe the philosophical basis of her art, which she defined as art created by an artist who strives towards her center and encounters divine presence there.

=== Exhibitions and Publications ===
Chodos' solo exhibit from 1995 "In the Forest of Amida Budda" was described by William Wilson in the Los Angeles Times as a "small but impressive solo." This exhibition featured works that appeared similar to Japanese scrolls. Chodos painted on top of Mylar with inks and acrylics to get a unique texture for these works.

Chodos published Metamorphoses: The Transformative Vision of Junko Chodos, a catalog of the one-person exhibition of the art of Junko Chodos at the Long Beach Museum of Art in the Fall of 2001. The book featured full-color high-quality reproductions and five critical essays. The works included a selection from collages to mylars included in her "Esoteric Buddhism" series, inside CD jewel boxes. The book won "Best Art Book of the Year - First Prize"" from Independent Publisher in 2002.

In 2005, the Museum of Contemporary Religious Art in Missouri presented a 30-year retrospective of her work titled "Junko Chodos: The Breath of Consciousness". The exhibition title referenced a recurrent image in her work: the lungs. The exhibition included complex drawings of roots and dead flowers and works from a 1991 series, "Requiem for an Executed Bird". In the same year, the Fresno Art Museum Council of 100 gave Junko Chodos The Distinguished Woman Artist Award. The award is given to a woman who "has spent thirty or more years in the studio and has created a unique and prestigious body of work."

Her influences include Paul Klee, Willem de Kooning, Matthias Grünewald, Albrecht Dürer and Japanese calligraphy, as well as the authors Rainer Maria Rilke, Herbert Read and Martin Buber. In 2010, Chodos was named a Fellow of the Society for the Arts, Religion and Contemporary Culture.

== Centripetal Art ==
Junko Chodos has termed her art as "Centripetal" in nature. The New Republic defines centripetal artists as artists "whose preoccupation is directed to a dramatization of their accidental or willful individualism". A centripetal painter "believes in self-illumination, improvisation, speaking for himself alone", they "look to museums when not at mirrors". Junko Chodos herself defines it as "art created by an artist who strives towards her center and encounters Divine Presence there, where people go beyond the barriers of ethnicity, gender, religious denominations, dogma, and of confined ideas of blood and soil.

In 2008, Junko and her husband formed the Foundation for Centripetal Art to spread its ideas.
