= Lenore Malen =

American artist

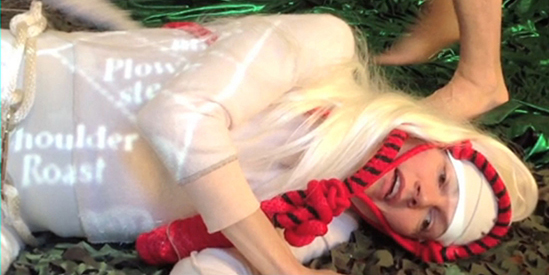
- Malen in a performance still from Don't Go Through That Door in 2013
- Born: New York City
- Education: Skidmore College; University of Pennsylvania Arts and Sciences
- Known for: Installation, Video, Performance
- Awards: Guggenheim Fellowship, New York Foundation for the Arts Fellowship
- Website: www.lenoremalen.com

Lenore Malen is an American artist who creates video installations, photography, and performance. Malen was awarded a Guggenheim fellowship and a NYFA Grant in Interdisciplinary Art in 2009.

== Early life and career ==
Malen was born and lives and works in New York City. Malen's father, Philip J. Levitt, was a music critic and several uncles were artists, including the printmaker Edwin Kaufman and the Works Projects Administration painter Lionel Stern. Malen received a BA degree from Skidmore College in art history, and an MA in art history from the University of Pennsylvania (1972). She began her career as a painter, curator and art critic, exhibiting at the Aldrich Contemporary Art Museum and writing for Arts Magazine under the editorship of Richard Martin. From 1990 to 1996, Malen served as executive editor of Art Journal, published by the College Art Association.

In January 2017 review in The Brooklyn Rail, writer Ann McCoy describes the scope of Malen's work, "Lenore Malen is an artist of extraordinary intelligence, compassion, and depth. Her work bridges biology, ecology, philosophy, performance, political science, and a wide range of literature."

== Artwork ==
=== Painting and sculpture (1979–1999) ===
During this period, Malen exhibited her minimalist paintings at the Aldrich Museum of Contemporary Art, Ridgefield, CT; The Locks Gallery, Philadelphia, PA; Galerie Fabian Carlsson, Gôteborg, Sweden; Frank Marino Gallery, New York City, NY; M13 Gallery (Howard Scott), New York City, NY; and Michael Walls Gallery, New York City, NY.

=== Games (1998–1999) ===
Beginning in 1998, Malen's interest in games inspired a series of site-specific works and artists' books that engaged the viewer as a direct participant. Her book Opportunity Knocks (1998), produced to coincide with an exhibition at Rutgers University, was described by critic Nancy Princenthal in Art on Paper (1998) as having a "distinctive blend of urgency and fatalism played for laughs." In 1999, the photographs from Opportunity Knocks were featured in a window exhibition at Printed Matter, New York, NY. Other game-based projects include "Magnetic Map" (1999), created for Art in General New York; "The Lottery" (1999), an exhibition she curated for Rotunda in Brooklyn; and illustrated short stories for France-Fiction, Paris.

=== The New Society for Universal Harmony (1999–present) ===
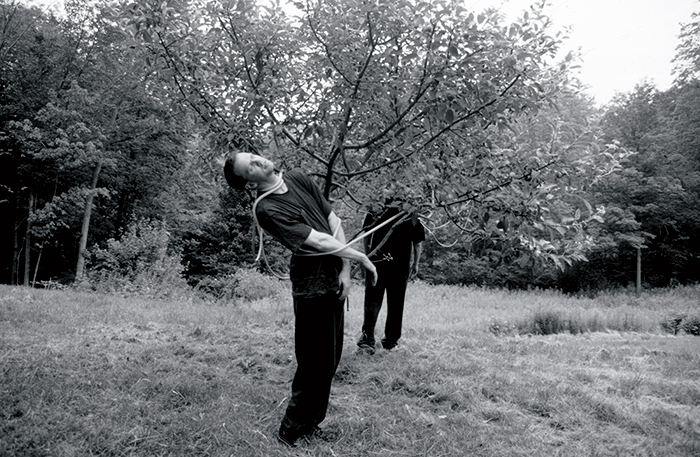
photograph from The New Society for Universal Harmony, 2005

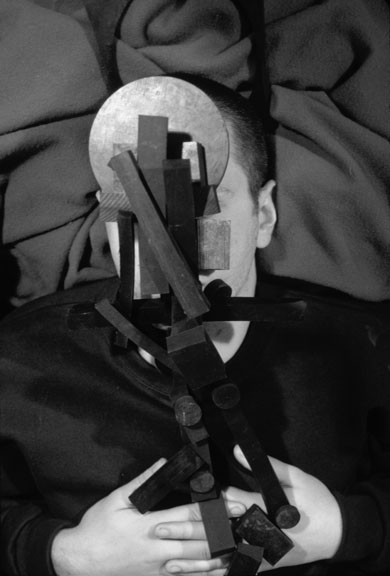
photograph from The New Society for Universal Harmony, 2005

In 1999, Malen initiated the ongoing project The New Society for Universal Harmony, a fictive reinvention of La Société de l'harmonie universelle, founded by Franz Mesmer in Paris in 1784. The art critic, Gary Indiana has written on Malen's work describing it as a metaphorical utopian fiction of the life of Mesmer. The New Society for Universal Harmony uses pseudo-documentary photos, video and audio transcriptions, testimonials, case histories and other devices drawn from historical reenactment, to archive the functioning of Malen's reinvention of Mesmer's 18th century utopian society.*

In 2005, Granary Books published Malen's book, eponymously titled The New Society for Universal Harmony. The book's black and white photographs illustrate a range of influences – from the Kinsey Institute's archives, stills from Peter Weiss's 1967 theatrical production and film Marat/Sade and photographs by 19th-century French anatomist Guillaume-Benjamin-Amand Duchenne de Boulogne, to the photographs of the 19th-century photographer Carleton Watkins.

The New Society also functions as an actual society of artists and actors who perform the reenactments and rituals, whose documented activities survive as artworks. The New Society produces Malen's collaborative projects such as La Société de l'harmonie universelle, Harmony as a Hive, and I am the Animal, all of which explore utopian themes.

==== La Société de l'harmonie universelle (1999–2008) ====
Originally commissioned in 1999 as a photo and text work for Paris' 9/9 revue d'art practique, it was presented in New York City as a performance at the College Art Association, Apex Art, Artists Talk on Art, Participant, Inc. (2005), and Location One (2007). Featured on Jochen Gerz' web-based anthology-of-art, it was exhibited at the Centre Pompidou and other museums. The photographic prints were installed at Castle Gallery, New Rochelle, New York; Klenova Castle, Klatovy, Czech Republic; and Trynarstarka Tower, Lublin, Poland. A 2004 solo exhibition presented at the Slought Foundation, Philadelphia, PA, traveled to the Schick Art Gallery, Skidmore College, Saratoga Springs, NY and CUE Art Foundation, New York City, New York in 2007. In 2008, Wesleyan University's Zilkha Gallery presented the multi-media installation "Lenore Malen and the New Society for Universal Harmony."

In addition, The New Society has been featured in numerous publications and on television. In Fall 2002, the writer Jonathan Ames wrote a short story for BOMB Magazine about his visit to The New Society in Athol Springs, New York. In 2005, Malen performed for the BBC as Doctor Mesmer in Miriam Margolyes's television production Dickens in America]. The Anthology of Art included Malen's "The Magnetic Reconnection Experiment", 2001, in its archive of 156 artists and theorists from all over the world.

==== Harmony as a Hive (2007–2009) ====
Toward the end of Malen's CUE Art Foundation exhibition, she presented a live performance that explored the social structure of the beehive as a model of utopia. Following this performance, Malen began raising bees in Hudson, NY.

==== I Am the Animal (2009–2012) ====
I Am The Animal, Part I (2009) is a 22-minute documentary on beekeepers in the Hudson Valley, New York. Subsequently, Malen broadened her focus to an exploration of the philosophical differences and exclusions between animals and humans. A three-channel immersive video installation, I Am The Animal, Part II attempts to reverse anthropomorphism by re-imagining human culture as a hive through the co-mingling of historic, documentary and mass-media footage. It was installed at the Mediations Biennale in Poznan, Poland (2012); Tufts University Art Gallery, Medford, MA (2011); and Wave Hill, NY (2010).

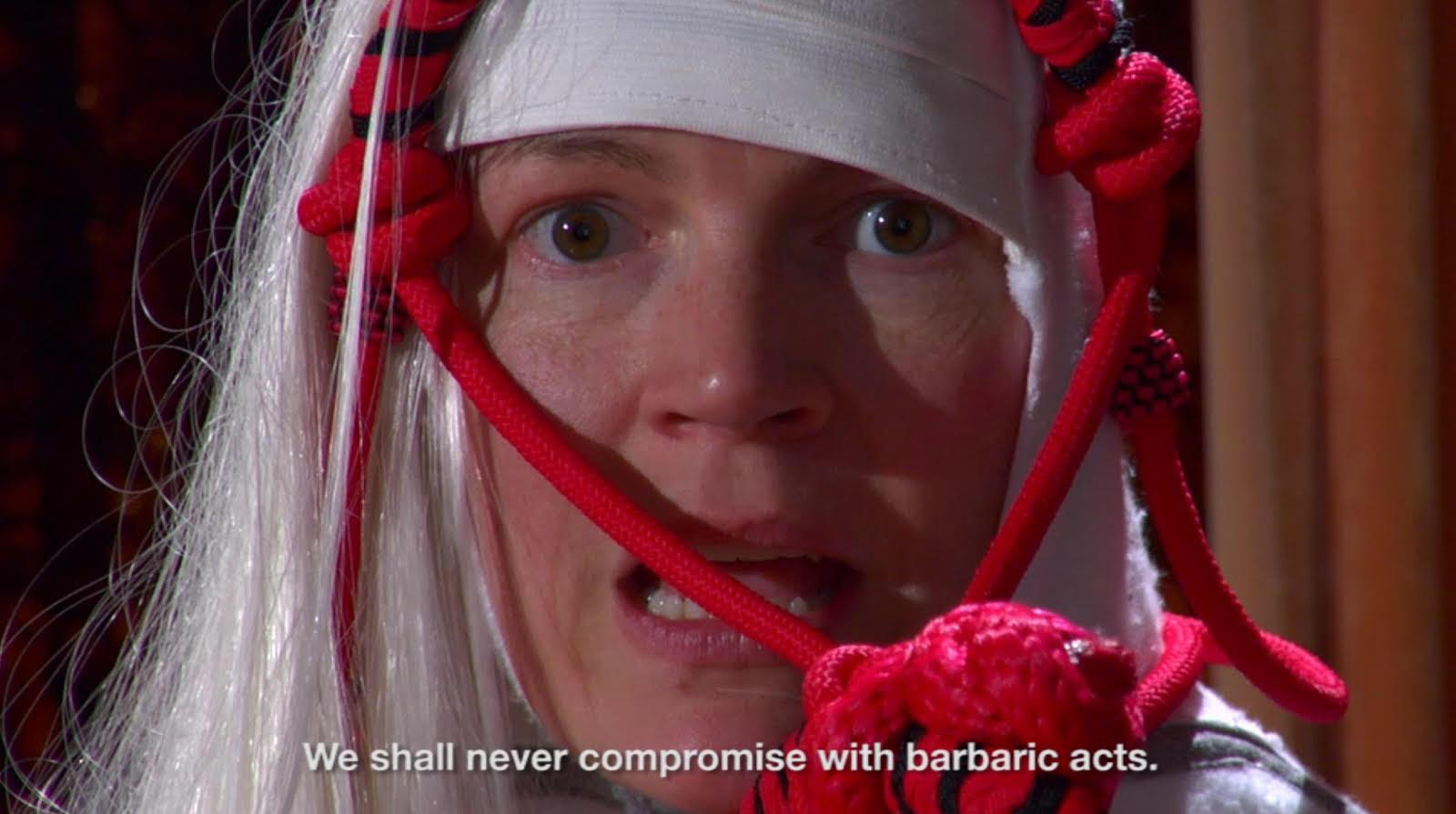

==== Scenes from Paradise (2015–2017) ====
Scenes from Paradise is a dark comedy presented in multiple formats: a film, live performances, and three-channel video installations, which are variously titled Reversal, The Reason of the Strongest is Always the Best, So we'll no more go a rowing by the light of the moon and Scenes From Paradise. In every format Eden, the cautionary tale, is made newly relevant by the ticking clock of climate change, habitat loss and extinction. The entire project was inspired by a 15th-century manuscript illumination discovered on the internet.

The Brooklyn Rail reviewed Malen's Scenes of Paradise in January 2017. In the review Ann McCoy states "In Scenes from Paradise we return to Eden for a course correction, we have forgotten that we share the same web of life for survival." In Artforum (January 2017) the art critic Nicholas Chittenden Morgan wrote: "Understanding language as political, Malen presents inter-species relationships without sentimentality. Her affective tools — satire, Biblical absurdism, and the compassion it took to found The New Society for Universal Harmony . . . are worth holding onto. . . ." Malen's work is also featured in a 2015 review from an artist-run blog, Romanov Grave.

Scenes from Paradise has been exhibited at Studio10, Brooklyn, NY in January 2017 and was performed live at Art Omi International Art Center in July 2016.

== Teaching, residencies, fellowships ==
Malen is an associate teaching professor in the MFA Fine Arts Program at Parsons The New School For Design, where she has taught since 1991. She previously taught at RISD, Cooper Union, Bennington College, University of the Arts and Arcadia University. Between 1990 and 2003 Malen was awarded residences at Yaddo, New York; Blue Mountain Center, New York; and held a Hand Hollow Foundation Fellowship at the Fine Arts Work Center in Provincetown, Massachusetts (1998). She was a visiting artist at the Vermont Studio Center in 1997, and a senior fellow at the Terra Foundation, Giverny, France, in 2001.
