= Terry Berlier =

American artist

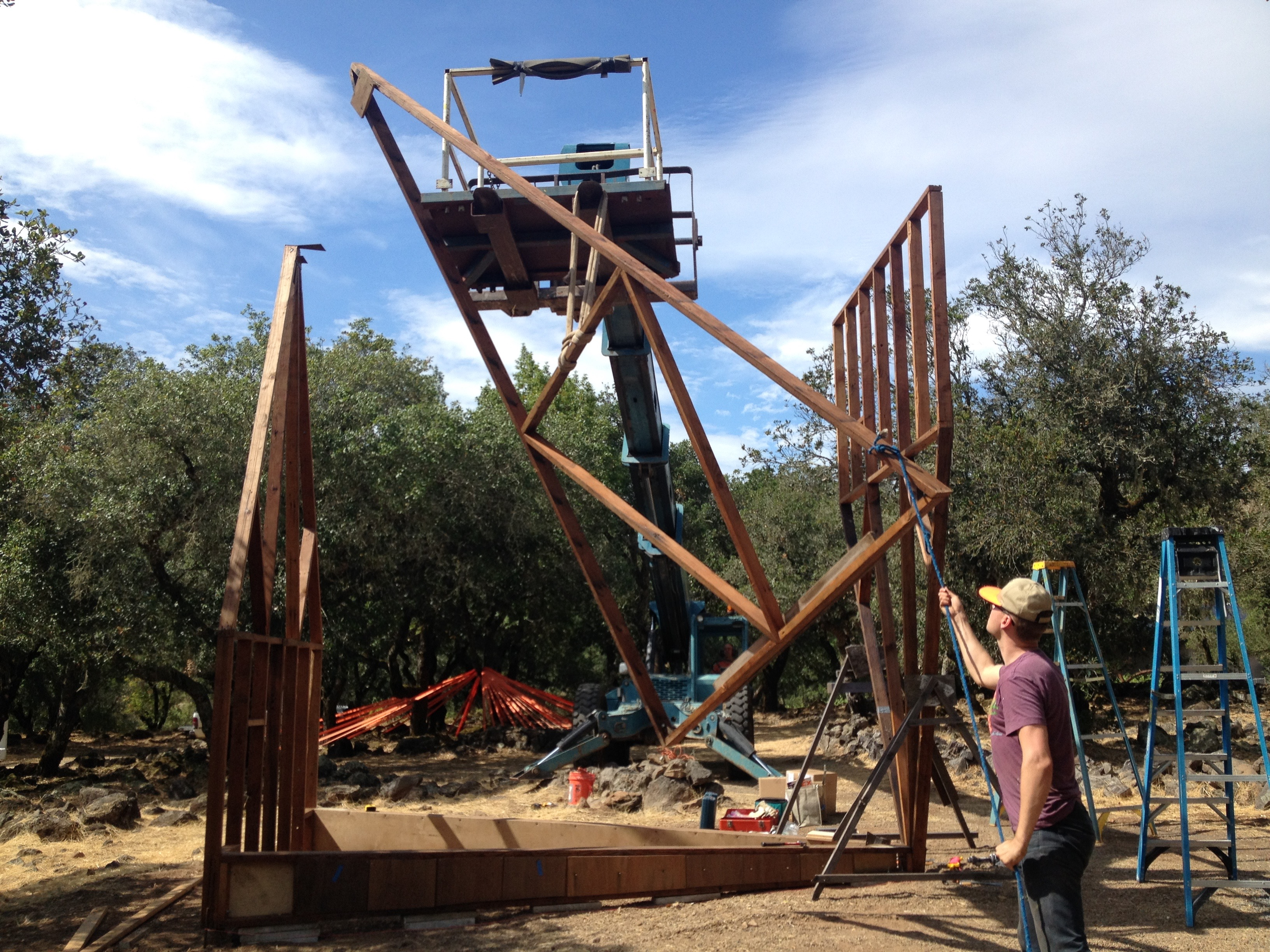
- Installing "This Side Up, Handle With Care"
- Born: 1972 (age 53–54); Cincinnati, Ohio
- Education: Miami University; University of California, Davis
- Notable work: "Log-rhythms" (2013); Where The Beginning Meets The End (2012)
- Website: Official website

Terry Berlier (born 1972, in Cincinnati, Ohio) is an artist and sculptor whose work addresses themes of the environment and queer practice. Her work incorporates kinetic, sound based media, video, installation, and performance to address these themes.

== Life ==
Berlier holds a Bachelor of Fine Arts (BFA) from Miami University in Ohio and a Master of Fine Arts (MFA) from the University of California, Davis where she studied art with Annabeth Rosen, Lucy Puls, Douglas Kahn, Mike Henderson, Lynn Hershman Leeson, and Tirza True Latimer and studied queer theory with Gayatri Gopinath.

She has taught in the Stanford University Department of Art and Art History since 2007, and is currently a Full Professor and the Director of the Sculpture Lab. She was the Director of Graduate Studies from 2022-25.

She was a volunteer for the United States Peace Corps in Jamaica from 1995 to 1997.

In 2011-12, she participated as an artist-in-residence at San Francisco Recology's Art At The Dump program, and since 2013 has served on its board.

== Work ==
Gender, joinery, and ecology are at the heart of Berlier's practice as a visual artist. She is invested in how objects can be queered and their meaning altered. Kinetic and sound sculptures in particular are central to her practice, and Berlier uses sculptural and installation elements to spark dialogues on wellbeing, human relationships, consumption, and survival.

An early work from 1998, Two Pan Tops Can Meet, reclaimed a homophobic saying she encountered while working as a Peace Corps Volunteer in Jamaica. The proverb “two pan tops can’t meet” was a perplexing, humorous, and perilous warning that Berlier could not come out for fear of her personal safety. In the pan lid she discovered an everyday object that could be queered; it made sound when struck and allowed her to speak back to a heteronormative culture. This led to a series where she repurposed discarded pan lids, collaborated with composers to resound queer futures with these sound sculptures.

Berlier uses everyday and found objects in her work to raise questions about gender, as well as consumption and ecology. She served on the Recology Artist in Residency board in San Francisco, highlighting concerns with the environment and sustainability.

== Solo exhibitions ==
Berlier has 20 solo exhibitions on her CV spanning from 2000 to 2021. She has exhibited her work all over the United States, as well as Japan, Norway, and Spain.

A recent project, A Kind of Ache (2021), commissioned by and took place at The Clarice gallery at the University of Maryland in collaboration with composer Sarah Heinnes and the band The Living Earth, who played music during the show. The piece was performed at EMPAC, Experimental Media + Performing Arts Center at Rensselaer Polytechnic Institute (RPI), Troy, NY in 2023. In 2017 her exhibition Resounding Desire Lines was featured at the Center for New Music in San Francisco, CA. Her sculptures, designed with kinetics and interactivity, were displayed as a part of the Maker Music Festival. In 2014 at the Weston Art Gallery in Cincinnati, Ohio her exhibition Time Slip displayed two of her large-scale works that represent the environment and time perception: Standard Time and Not So Solid Earth. Her exhibition Sounding Board (2012) at the Thomas Welton Art Gallery at Stanford University displayed four of her kinetic sculptures, including Play, This Side Up Handle With Care, a treehouse sculpture. During her Recology Residency in San Francisco, CA, Berlier exhibited with other artists in residency Donna Anderson Kam and Ethan Estess. her sculptures were ones that "metaphorically excavate and honor these [modern] inventions and our intertwined relationships to them." In 2012, Berlier had a solo exhibition, Even the Windmills are Weakening, at Recology AIR San Francisco aka the Dump. Here, artists create pieces using recycled materials while in residence for four months. Berlier created over seventeen new sculptures while at Recology. One of her earliest solo exhibitions that gained coverage was Open Secret (2011) at the San Francisco Arts Commission Grove Street Gallery. This exhibition featured found web photos of nuclear waste and nuclear plants as a response to nuclear issues.

== Group exhibitions ==
Berlier has done many collaborations with other artists. Her most recent work, Pulled Apart, was featured in the University of San Francisco's Thacher Gallery. This collaboration piece interweaved mechanical movement and sound to demonstrate an exploration of human connection and identity. In 2019 she was in a group show with other artists including Mungo Thomson on an exhibition in Sacramento's Verge Gallery which was curated by Francesca Wilmott, and was also accompanied by the two-volume book, Slant Step Book: The Mysterious Object and the Artworks. In 2011, she worked on Perfect Lovers. This is a large, 30 foot long piece that symbolizes time.
