= Varaz Samuelian =

Varaz Samuelian Վարազ Սամվելյան
- Born: Varazdat Samuel Samuelian; 1917; Yerevan, Armenia, Russian Empire
- Died: November 7, 1995 (age 78); Fresno, California, United States
- Occupations: writer, painter and sculptor
- Spouse: Ann

Varazdat Samuel "Varaz" Samuelian (Armenian: Վարազդատ Սամվելի "Վարազ" Սամվելյան, 1917 – November 7, 1995) was a prominent Armenian American writer, painter and sculptor.

== Life and works ==
Of Armenian descent, Varaz Samuelian was born in Yerevan, Armenia. His parents were survivors of the Armenian genocide.

Samuelian eventually settled in France. During his time in Paris, Samuelian studied with renowned painters such as Othon Friesz, André Lhote and Fernand Léger. During World War II he was a German prisoner of war.

Samuelian eventually settled in California in 1946. When arriving in California he moved to Burlingame to be closer with his brother. It was during this period in his life where he began to paint. He turned his painting hobby into a business as a sign painter. Due to his success as a sign painter, he eventually moved to Belmont, California. Samuelian eventually met his wife Ann there.

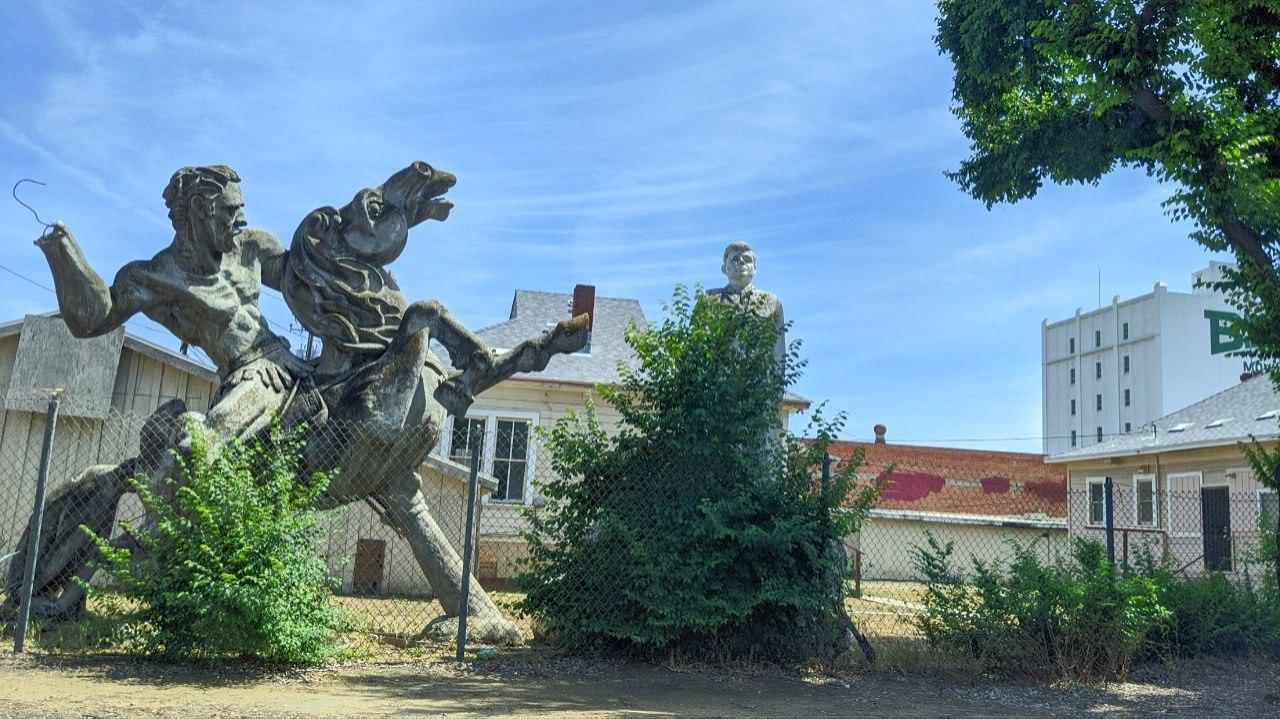
Samuelian's Abandoned Statue of David of Sassoun near Highway 41 and Van Ness in downtown Fresno, California USA

Varaz Samuelian estimated that during his career he created a thousand works of art, including a monumental statue of the Armenian folkloric legend David of Sassoun in front of the Fresno County Courthouse. He is also noted for his bronze bust of William Saroyan at the entrance of the Fresno Convention Center.

Varaz Samuelian was a writer of several books, including one on his relationship with William Saroyan entitled Willie and Me.

He died on November 7, 1995, at the age of 78.

== Legacy ==
In 1965 William Saroyan wrote a short novel dedicated to Varaz Samuelian entitled Who is Varaz?

The Varaz Samuelian Cultural Center, named after him, was inaugurated in the village of Artik, Shirak Province, in Armenia on September 1, 2010. The building is 6,000 square feet and serves as a cultural resource center for the village. The center contains an art gallery, auditorium and a computer room.

== Writings ==
- A history of Armenia and my life: Writing and drawing (1978)
- Neutron bomb and what is art (1978)
- Circus: 96 water colors (1980)
- Willie and Varaz: Memories of my friend William Saroyan (1985)
