= Betty Beaumont =

Canadian-American artist

- Born: January 8, 1946 (age 80); Toronto, Ontario, Canada
- Education: California State University, Northridge (B.A. 1969); University of California Berkeley (M.A. 1972)
- Known for: Minimalist artist, Conceptual artist, Installation artist, Ecological artist

Betty Beaumont (born January 8, 1946) is a Canadian-American site-specific and conceptual installation artist, sculptor, and photographer. She is an internationally recognized artist known to explore cross-disciplinary media, interweaving the environmental, social, economic, political, and the architectural. Beaumont lives and works in New York City.

Beaumont's diverse body of work challenges global social awareness, as well as socioeconomic and ecological practices. Beaumont is involved with investigating solution-based sustainability strategies that reflect contemporary, historic, and cultural perspectives and environmental and social conditions.

One of Beaumont's most notable works is the environmental installation Ocean Landmark (1978–1980), a grand-scale underwater project. The installation consists of 17,000 neutralized coal fly-ash blocks strategically submerged three miles off Fire Island National Seashore to lay on the floor of the Atlantic Ocean, creating an artificial habitat for marine life.

== Early life and education ==
Born in Toronto, Ontario, Beaumont emigrated with her family to Los Angeles at an early age. She attended California State University, Northridge where she graduated with a bachelor's degree in 1969. Beaumont earned her master's degree from College of Environmental Design in the School of Architecture at the University of California, Berkeley in 1972 before moving to Chicago and then to New York City in 1973, where she currently resides. In 1976, Beaumont built a film set for Andy Warhol at The Factory, worked part-time with filmmaker Barbara Kopple, and danced at Brooklyn Academy of Music with Twyla Tharp in Half the Hundreds, as well as Anna Halprin at the San Francisco Museum of Modern Art.

== Work ==
Beaumont has described art as central to shaping the world. "[Art] asks questions, provokes imagination and presents new paradigms for thought and meaning. The flow from the specific, concrete, and technical, to the abstract, meditative and lyrical characterizes my work."

Beaumont's work questions and seeks to bring awareness to various worldviews and perspectives, often through the lens of the shared human frameworks of language, image, and object.

Many of her projects contain bodies of work in themselves, as she continues to return to contemporary questions that provoke her to expand on these threads of ideas using new technological tools.

=== Works (1969–1980) ===
While a graduate student at the School of Architecture at the University of California, Berkeley, Beaumont documented the 1969 Santa Barbara oil spill through a series of black and white photographs called Steam Cleaning The Santa Barbara Shores… Her photographs captured the destruction of the shoreline ecosystem by the power washing oil from the rocks with high-pressure steam hoses.

The image is partnered with a work from 2001 entitled Timeline of Global Oil Spills 1960-2004, a stark black and white pigment print that graphically lists the many major global oil spills in a poetic timeline.

Her earliest work paralleled the growth of the West Coast women's art movement of the late 1960s and early 1970s.

Time spent living in the high desert mesas with the Native American Hopi led her to an exploration of society's interactions with nature and the environment. In the early 70s she began a series of site-specific outdoor installations, which sought to re-establish a relationship between people and their environment and were inspired in part by Lacanian psychoanalysis and Merleau-Ponty's phenomenology.

In 1977, Beaumont created Cable Piece, forming an enormous iron ring of 4,000 feet of cable measuring 100 feet in diameter, which was left to bury itself slowly in the ground on a farm in Macomb, Illinois. The rust content of the ring affected the growth pattern of the soil, over time transforming the metal ring into a lush grass circle. The ring configuration suggested technological and mythological connections with the Fermi Laboratory, a neutron accelerator plant located nearby, and Native American burial and ceremonial mounds of the Midwest.

Beaumont's 1977 work Found Words is a record of found fragments originating from anonymous people and their unknown activities. After nine months of photographing the fragments, the systemic work began when the first one was brought into her studio. It began a collection, which culminated in a series of 116 hand-made paper works and collaboration with Hiroaki Sato who translated 9 months of autobiographical fragments. After exhibitions at the National Museum of Modern Art in Tokyo (1977) and Kyoto (1978), a collaboration with poet and linguist Kyoko Iriye that translated the found images into the closest Japanese language character. The project culminated in a box set of paper works and a comprehensive artist's book, featuring English text by Beaumont translated into Japanese by Hiroaki Sato.

In 1978, Beaumont created a set of chromogenic prints entitled Love Canal USA. Hooker Chemical Company had used the Love Canal, near Niagara Falls, New York, as a dumping site for several decades. The waste eventually seeped into and contaminated the neighborhood's soil and groundwater, leading to a host of health problems for residents. Her photographs of deserted and boarded houses surrounding Love Canal addressed the concepts of community identity, what "home" is to those dispossessed, and the reclamation of a history propelled by pollution and corporate neglect that sought for it to be erased.

A decade of large-scale studio sculptures, shown at the National Museum of Art in Tokyo and in Kyoto, as well as a decade of five outdoor concept-based performative site-works, culminated in the grand-scale Ocean Landmark (1978–1980), which also dealt with the issues of reclamation and the future, working through the one toward the viability of the other. This art-and-science collaboration is a trans-disciplinary environmental artwork that recycles waste, establishes a habitat for fish, is fished and continues to feed people, is a model for new industry that considers industrial ecology, and is a vision of how to revitalize the coastal fishing industry.

=== Ocean Landmark (1978–1980) ===
Beaumont's Ocean Landmark (1978–1980) was a $3 million project that was jointly sponsored by the US Department of Energy, The Smithsonian Institution, Bell Labs, Columbia University's Lamont Doherty Earth Observatory, National Endowment for the Arts Fellowship, America the Beautiful Fund, Media Bureau, and in-kind contributions.

She collaborated with a team of scientists and engineers who were experimenting with coal-waste and ways to stabilize the industrial byproduct in water. She in turn proposed the concept of processing waste material into an underwater sculpture that would function as an artificial reef that would create a place where people might come and fish. Rendered inert, the waste material was laid 70 feet below the Atlantic Ocean's surface and became a lush underwater garden.

Although the grand-scale sculpture, strongly influenced by feminism, psychoanalysis, and cognition is not visible to viewers, the submersive installation of the project can be experienced through a VRML representation, produced by Beaumont and other participants in 2000, through New York University's Interactive Telecommunications Program (ITP).

Ocean Landmark is listed as a "fish haven" on the National Oceanographic and Atmospheric Administration (NOAA) coastal navigational map and has received a volume of critical attention in publications and articles like Phaidon's Land and Environmental Art edited by Jeffrey Kastner, Art Press (1987), Heresies Magazine (1988), and The Wall Street Journal (1990) among others.

=== Works (1984-present) ===
In the following years, Beaumont worked to develop Windows on Multinationals (1984–1987), Toxic Imaging (1987) and El Otro Sendero (1988). These ambitious and extensively researched combined-media installations deal with the poisoning of mental and physical health, the uprooting of social structures, economic and political corruption, environmental pollution and media manipulation.

In 1989, Beaumont began working on a project that would continue to develop and expand for the next two decades. Titled A Night in Alexandria...The Rainforest...Whose Histories Are They Anyway?, Beaumont created a transformative and cautionary dissertation on the meaning of loss.

Beaumont created a list of over 150 personally significant books and collected replicas from bookstores. The books were treated, burned, displayed, and arranged in over thirty feet of floor to ceiling shelving. Through the metaphor of fire and the social horror of book burning, the project grieves the irretrievable loss of species (DNA) contained in the rainforest, as irretrievable as the loss of the ancient body of knowledge contained at the Library of Alexandria—both sources of encyclopedic information.

For the first anniversary of the Velvet Revolution in Prague, Beaumont created the installation Voices (Whose What Which) (1990) at the Stalinov Pomnik. The opening was attended by Vaclav Havel. This work invites the viewer to participate in a visual dialogue questioning the origins and location of voice by exploring public language in a public place.

A founding member of REPOhistory, she coordinated and produced, with other artists, the medical section of Choice Histories (1992) installation at Artists Space.

In 2004, Beaumont created Camouflaged Cell Concealment Sites, a series of color photographs documenting camouflaged cell towers disguised as everyday sights such as palm trees, water towers, and cacti throughout various climates like Azusa, California; Phoenix, Arizona; Atlanta, Georgia; and Sparta, New Jersey. She seeks to examine the extent in which greenwashing exhibits itself throughout natural environments and a reconsideration of preconceptions.

In 2006, Beaumont created Boxed In/Boxed Out: The Mobile Studio Project, an ambitious solo installation pointing to the suburbanization of Manhattan following the displacement of artists and demolition of historic architecture in favor of large-scale condos, which was held across from the NY Stock Exchange in the Lower Manhattan Cultural Council's (LMCC) 3,000 square-foot Swing Space.

In 2008, Beaumont had a solo exhibition at the New Arts Program in Kutztown, PA, entitled Who Will Our Children Sing Songs About in 100 Years?, an installation that consisted of four geometric sculptures: a line (parallel to the floor), a circle, a triangle and a rectangle, all constructed of children's chairs. The colors for the four chair-arranged geometries relate directly to the flag colors of nations with the fastest explosion or implosion of population change: USA, Africa, China, and India, while Children's XO laptops display world clock counters.

A related work, Way (2009), contains 21 variations of the word Way paired with WHOSE, WHAT, WHICH in Swahili, Hindi, Chinese, and English written on 500-sheets of a wall-mounted, tear-off-sheet tablet. The work is one in a series using tear-off-sheet tablets. As each sheet is torn, the work is changed to reveal one of the permutations challenging the viewer to re-examine their beliefs, actions or inactions, tolerance of misinformation and potential to effect change- while the pile reflects viewer participation.

With the Great Recession in 2008, Beaumont began an ongoing sculpture project to address consumerism, the construction of identity, and the seismic global economic shift on a personal level. Untitled (Crushed), a work consisting of one-hundred-plus unique works- crushed branded shopping bags collected by Beaumont, presents the bags as deconstructed fetishized icons of beauty and the branding of identity.

A related work, the sculptural assemblage Prêt-à-Porter, is a societal construct of identity. The work consists of a collection of international shopping bags, a rolling double clothes rack, and hangers. The branded shopping bags are hung with tags naming the individual who contributed the bag. The highly designed and produced bags are surrogates for both garment and identity, while each nametag labels a person with a specific branded identity.

In June 2012, the entire Alexandria... series was presented together for the first time at the Library of Alexandria in Egypt (the physical installation having been previously shown at MoMA PS1 and at Hudson River Museum). The newly designed recently built Bibliotheca Alexandrina at the site of the ancient library was an ideal venue for the exhibition of the Alexandria... series, which included the new Global Lost Libraries (2012), sequential projections of photographs of volumes Beaumont had burned, accompanied by live readings of the contents of global lost libraries. Four prints plus a 148-page digital catalog are now in the permanent archives of the Bibliotheca Alexandrina.

Inspired by her experience in Egypt during the country's 2012 election week and of demonstrations at Cairo's Tahrir Square, she created Arab Voices in 2012. Four words—Whose, What, Which, and My—were translated into Arabic and were placed in various locations on four walls. The installation examined, questioned, and expanded the newly established public sphere of connection and interchange through the possibilities of voice. Arab Voices built upon a range of her previous works that promote audience participation, some of which include WAY and Voices and Morals, Ethics, Values.

Studio Papers Redux – It Makes My Head Spin & My Heart Sing (2013) is a personal series of works that were a celebration of Beaumont's forty years of working in her New York City studio since 1973. Shredded and altered studio papers spanning those forty years- project research, descriptions, proposals and notes- were shredded and combined with musical instruments. Beaumont has said that the installation was informed by a dream she had the first week moving to NYC. "My possessions were on fire, yet were not destroyed, and were burning—a surrealist image of energy."

In early 2016, an exhibition at the DiMattio Gallery in Monmouth, New Jersey presented installation studies for a project addressing language attrition. These conceptual studies include site-specific arrangements of wooden sound columns (made of reclaimed organ pipes, which would play audio of songs in endangered languages). This project furthers Beaumont's continuing interest in the erosion of human knowledge and the cultural amnesia that accompanies the loss of languages.

== Exhibitions ==
Before receiving her master's degree in 1972 from UC Berkeley, Beaumont's work had been exhibited in New York City at the Museum of Contemporary Crafts, now the Museum of Arts and Design, and in London at the Camden Art Center.

Since 1972, Betty Beaumont's work has been included in solo and group exhibitions around the world. Her installations and art works have also been widely displayed and realized in numerous New York City galleries and museums.

A Night in Alexandria... installation at MoMA PS1 (1989).

An installation as part of the Ocean Landmark series marked the beginning of Beaumont's relationship with Damon Brandt Gallery in 1990 and subsequent artworks that the project inspired were shown at venues worldwide including Queens Museum, New York; Hudson River Museum, New York; Ota Gallery, Tokyo; Bea Voigt Gallery, Munich; and the French Embassy, Yaoundé, Cameroon.

In 1994, Beaumont began exhibiting with Colin de Land at American Fine Arts Gallery. The John Gibson Gallery began to represent her in 2002 and placed several of her works in important collections in Europe and the United States.

In 2002, the Puffin Foundation, NEA, and NYU supported production of work and a trip to Cuba for the installation of the large-scale diptych, Steam Cleaning the Santa Barbara Shore –the Worst Oil Spill in U.S. History + Time Line of Global Oil Spills 1960 –2004 (2002). This photographic work was exhibited at the National Library José Martí in Havana.

In the Netherlands, Museum Het Domein, presented her video installation 5 Works. The performance images from her 1989 work Riverwalk were exhibited at ESSO Gallery, New York City (2004).

In 2015, a selection of photographs taken by Beaumont of WAC participants in the 1992 March for Women's Lives in Washington, DC were printed and exhibited at a solo exhibition at Northampton Community College in Bethlehem, PA.

A selection of her group exhibitions include: National Museum of Modern Art, Japan (1977, 1978); Internacional de Muestras de Bilbao, Spain (1983); Damon Brandt Gallery, New York City (1988, 1989); Bea Voigt Galerie, Germany (1993); Whitney Museum of American Art, New York (2001); Museo Tamayo, Mexico (2001); Bibliotheca Nacional Jose Marti, Cuba (2002); Museum Het Domein, Netherlands (2004); Yaoundé, West Africa (2008); Galerie Erna Hecey, Belgium (2009); Guided By Invoices Gallery, New York (2012–13); Carriage Trade Gallery, New York, (2009, 2010, 2011, 2012, 2013, 2014); White Box, New York (2014); and DiMattio Gallery, New Jersey (2016).

Select solo exhibitions include: Galleri Stenström, Sweden (1978); Academy of Science and Art Gallery, Yugoslavia (1982); Richard Demarco Gallery, Scotland (1984); Performance Space, Massachusetts (1986); Stalinuv Pomnik, Prague (1990); Rochdale Art Gallery, England (1992); Galleri Göran Engström, Sweden (1996); John Gibson Gallery, New York (2001, 2003); New Arts Program, Pennsylvania (2008, 2015); Bibliotheca Alexandrina, Egypt (2012); Gallerie Heike Strelow, Germany (2014); 3A Gallery, New York (2014); Northampton College, Pennsylvania (2015).

Her work is included in the collections of the Bibliotheca Alexandrina in Alexandria, Egypt, the Museum of Modern Art in New York City, the Museum of the Art Institute of Chicago in Illinois, the Louisiana Museum of Modern Art in Humlebaek, Denmark, Ringier in Zurich, Switzerland, Vescom BV in Deurne, Netherlands, and Centre Pompidou-Metz, France.

== Awards and honors ==
Beaumont has received many awards, fellowships and grants. Some of which include six National Endowment for the Arts Fellowships (1973, 1977, 1980, 1985, 1997, 2002), four New York State Council for the Arts grants (1983, 1988, 1991, 2004, 2015), and three Pollock-Krasner Foundation Grants (1993, 1998, 2007), NYSCA Fellowship (1988), State University of New York at Purchase Faculty Support Award (1989), a Creative Capital Grant (2000), a World Parks Endowment Grant (2001), and a Puffin Foundation Grant (2002), New York Foundation for the Arts Sponsored Project Grant (2012).

Beaumont has served as a member of the Board of Advisors for the Art & Technology Program at the New York Hall of Science as well as on the Board of Directors of Women Make Movies. She is one of the artists featured in the video Totalitarian Zone (1991) by Czechoslovak film/video maker, Václav Kučera. Beaumont is also one of the 400 women artists listed in the Women Environmental Artists Directory.

She is a frequent conference panelist on subjects involving environmental art and collaborative projects and has worked with numerous venues including ArtSci99 Symposium, Columbia University, Bell Labs/Lucent Technologies, Interactive Telecommunications Project, and Japan Radio Network WMBS. Reviews of her work have appeared in Art Monthly, New York Magazine, The New York Times, NY ARTS, The Village Voice, Vita Nova Tokyo, Z Magazine and zingmagazine among others.

== Teaching ==
Beaumont taught sculpture at the School of the Art Institute of Chicago from 1972 to 1973, and at the University of California, Berkeley in 1976. She was an assistant professor of 3D Media at State University of New York (SUNY) at Purchase from 1985 to 1990, where she was awarded a Professor of the Year Award by the Purchase Student Union. She taught in the MFA program at the City University of New York (CUNY) at Hunter College from 1989 to 1993, and was an Arts Program faculty member at New York University's Gallatin School of Individualized Study from 1998 to 2001. She also served as a Graduate and Undergraduate Advisor at Gallatin from 1998 to 2007. In 2001, she was a visiting instructor at the Columbia University Graduate School of Architecture. In 2006, Beaumont was awarded a Distinguished Alumni Award from University of California, Berkeley.

== Art Research Collaboration ==
Beaumont is the founder of Art Research Collaboration (ARC), a non-profit organization that promotes and develops large-scale media and environmental projects that could otherwise not be realized. ARC's projects are diverse but they are connected by an interest in how new technologies can embrace humanity and nature. ARC's definition of the environment is all encompassing- personal, political, social, spiritual, physical, cultural, and economic. Two such projects are A Night in Alexandria… The Rain Rainforest… Whose Histories Are They Anyway? and Ocean Landmark. ARC is currently developing a project addressing language attrition and revitalization.

== Readings ==
- Betty Beaumont; Marilu Knode; Rochdale Art Gallery (Rochdale, England). Betty Beaumont : Changing Landscapes : Art in an Expanded Field : 26 August-23 September 1989 (Rochdale, Lancashire, England : Rochdale Art Gallery, 1989) (Worldcat link: ) OCLC 79731156
- Barbara C Matilsky; Queens Museum of Art. Fragile Ecologies : Contemporary Artists' Interpretations and Solutions (New York : Rizzoli International, 1992) (Worldcat link: ) ISBN 0-8478-1592-7; ISBN 978-0-8478-1592-0
