= Peninsula Museum of Art =

Californian non-profit art museum

Coordinates: 37.594782°N 122.382228°W

The Peninsula Museum of Art (2003–2023) was a 501(c)(3) non-profit art museum located on the San Francisco Peninsula in California.

== History ==
The Peninsula Museum of Art was founded by Ruth Waters and a group of working artists in 2003. It was first located at the Manor House in Twin Pines Park in Belmont, California. In 2004 it officially incorporated as the Peninsula Museum of Art and was granted 501(c)3 status.

In 2005 a building fund was established with seed monies from Charles Homer. In 2013 the museum completed renovation on an 18,000-square-foot complex in Belmont, California which housed both the museum and the Peninsula Art Institute. Together, the museum and Institute comprised five gallery spaces, a library, a classroom, a store and 30 working artists’ studios. Ruth Waters was the museum's Founder, chair and executive director from 2003 to 2020. The Burlingame location permanently closed in 2020 due to loss of lease for high density urban housing development.

In 2021 the museum found a new location in The Shops at Tanforan in San Bruno, California under the leadership of several previous board members. The San Bruno location closed in 2023.
