= Recology =

American waste management company

Recology Inc.
- Company type: Private
- Industry: Integrated Resource recovery
- Founded: 1920
- Headquarters: San Francisco, California, United States
- Area served: United States
- Key people: Sal Coniglio
- Revenue: ▲US$1 billion (2018)
- Number of employees: approx 3,700 people (2021)
- Website: www.recology.com

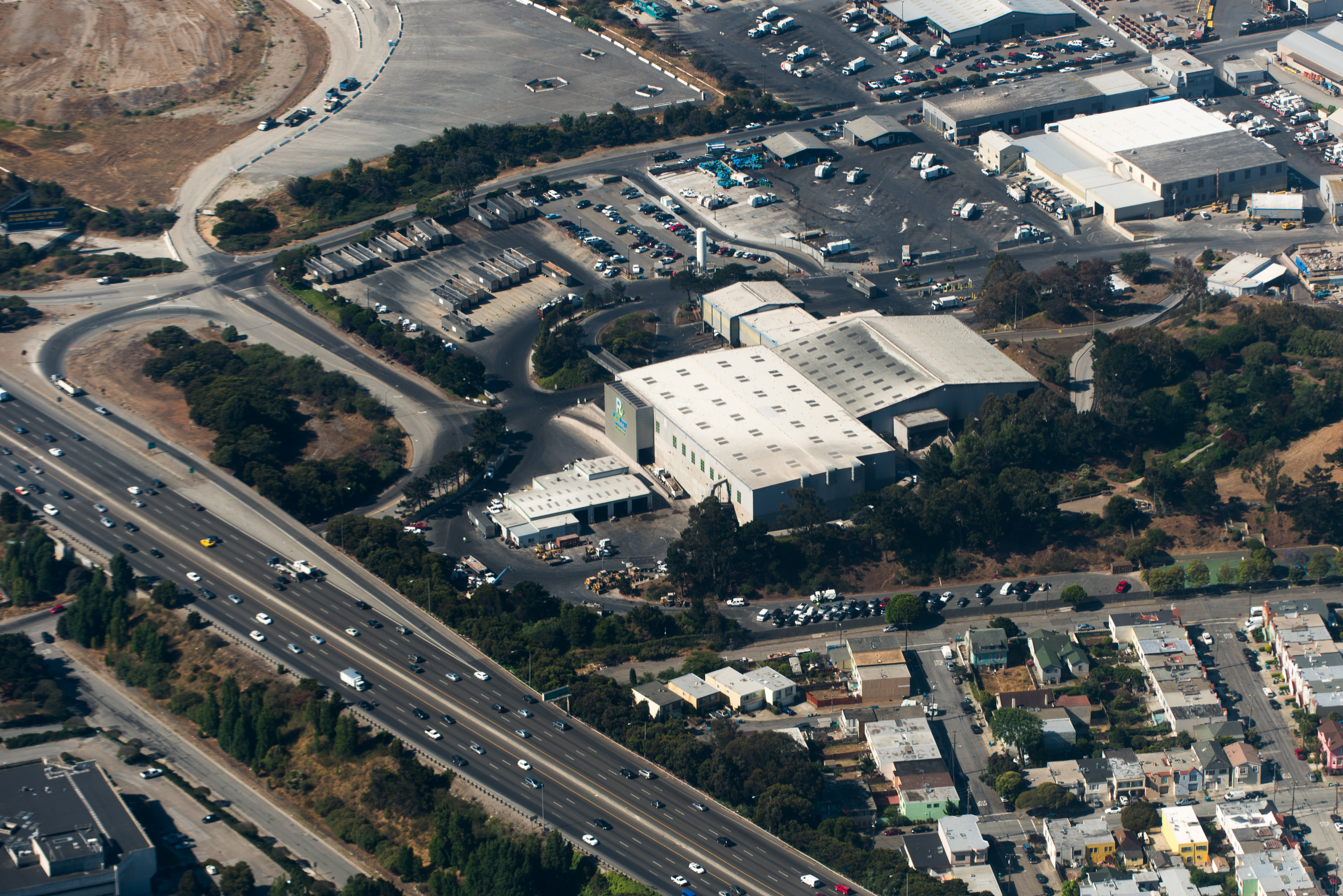
Aerial view of Recology San Francisco, Recology's dump/transfer station

Recology Inc., formerly known as Norcal Waste Systems, is an American waste management company headquartered in San Francisco, California. The company collects and processes municipal solid waste, reclaiming reusable materials. The company also operates transfer stations, materials recovery facilities (MRFs), a number of landfills, and continues to spearhead renewable energy projects. Recology is the largest organics compost facility operator by volume in the United States.

Recology Inc. is the parent to approximately 40 operating companies, including Recology San Francisco, Recology King County (Seattle), and Recology Portland.

== Description ==
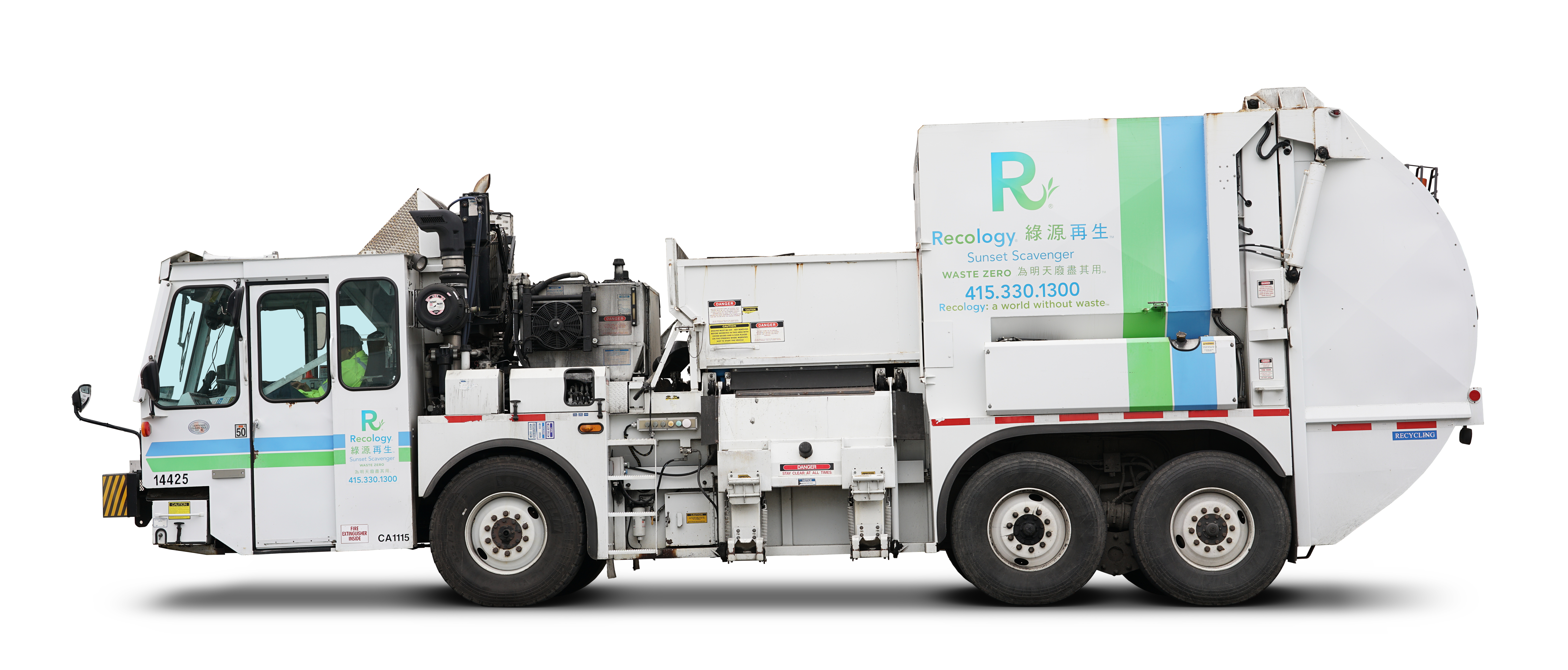
A Recology waste collection truck in San Francisco

Recology promotes recycling, composting, and other waste-reduction programs to minimize the amount of materials sent to landfills.

Just south of San Francisco, Recology brings solid and residential waste from Recology San Mateo County to the Shoreway Environmental Center, a large, multi-purpose recycling center and Materials Recovery Facility that is operated by South Bayside Industries (a division of Alameda County Industries), a joint venture between Recology and Potential Industries.

In early 2009, after an investigation, the company obtained a court order against various organized illegal "poachers" who were raiding curbside recycling containers to sell the contents for scrap.

As of 2015, the company employed approximately 3,000 employees, with revenues of approx $800 million. The company is 100% employee-owned through an employee stock ownership plan (ESOP).

== History ==
The company has a long history in the Bay Area, and holds a no-bid contract for garbage collection in San Francisco. In 1932, the city granted a permanent concession to the city's 97 independent garbage collectors; shortly thereafter those 97 independents banded together to form the company that would become Norcal Waste Systems. Since that time, the company has held a permanent no-bid, no-franchise-fee contract to collect the city's garbage and recyclables. The company works closely with SF Environment to achieve the city's diversion and sustainability goals.

In 2012, San Francisco voters considered Proposition A, a ballot measure that would have put the city's waste collection to five separate competitive-bid contracts. Residents Tony Kelly and retired Judge Quentin Kopp collected enough signatures to put Proposition A on the city's ballot. Prop A was overwhelmingly voted down, with 77% of the vote going for the continuation of Recology's services.

In 2021, subsidiaries of Recology operating in San Francisco were assessed $36 million in criminal penalties following a corruption scandal involving bribery and fraud.

== Artist in Residence Program ==
Founded in 1990 by Recology and environmental artist Jo Hanson, the Recology San Francisco Artist in Residence Program allows local artists, chosen by an advisory board made of arts professional, to use materials found in its materials recovery and processing facilities to create art. It was the first, and for a long period, only such program in the United States. The residency has since become highly competitive, hosting artists from the Bay Area.

Among the program's alumni are Nathaniel Stookey, who composed Junkestra, a classical music composition for thirty instruments made out of the company's refuse, Terry Berlier, who now sits on the board of the program, muralist Sirron Norris, and filmmaker Nomi Talisman. The PBS NewsHour highlighted the AIR Program in their Canvas series in 2019.

== See also ==
- Recycling in the United States
- Resource recovery
