= Shai Zakai =

Israeli photographer and artist

Shai Zakai שי זכאי
- Born: 1957 (age 68–69); Tel Aviv, Israel
- Education: Hadassah Academic College; Hebrew University of Jerusalem
- Known for: Photography

Shai Zakai (Hebrew: שי זכאי) is a photographer, artist, and ecological activist known for her artworks involving water reclamation.

== Life ==
Zakai was born in Tel Aviv in 1957. She studied at Hadassah College, Jerusalem and at Hebrew University.

== Work ==
Zakai's best-known piece of art is Concrete Creek, a three-year project started in 1999 that documented the cleanup of a concrete-polluted creek in the Valley of Elah. The piece includes video and photo documentary of the cleanup, as well as a sculpture created from the cleaned-up waste.

Zakai founded the Israeli Forum for Ecological Art in 1999 to encourage the development of ecological art in Israel and the world.
