= Andrew Rogers (artist) =

Australian sculptor and land artist

Andrew Rogers is a contemporary Australian sculptor. He is the creator of the world's largest contemporary land art undertaking. Titled Rhythms of Life, the project commenced in 1998 and at present comprises 51 massive stone structures across 16 countries on seven continents, and has involved over 7,500 people.

== Rhythms of Life ==
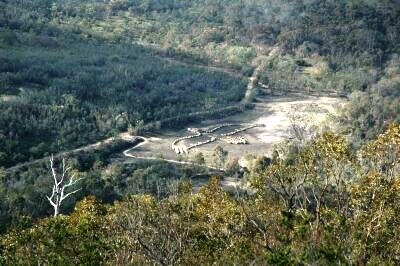
Bunjil geoglyph at the You Yangs, Lara, Australia. The creature has a wing span of 100 metres and approximately 1500 tons of rock was used to construct it.

The title of the project, the Rhythms of Life is derived from Rogers' early bronze sculptures.

Of particular note is a site in Cappadocia, Turkey, where between 2007 and 2011 Rogers completed the "Time and Space" geoglyph park. The thirteen structures comprise more than 10,500 tons of stone and, in total, the walls measure approximately 6 kilometres (4 mi) in length. The structures that lie furthest apart are separated by a distance of 2.5 km (1 1/2 mi).

Rogers' Rhythms of Life project is the largest contemporary land-art undertaking in the world, forming a chain of 51 stone sculptures, or geoglyphs, around the globe: 18 sites in disparate exotic locations from below sea level and up to altitudes of 4,300 metres (14,100 ft). Up to three geoglyphs, ranging in size up to 40,000 square metres (430,000 ft^{2}), are located at each site. To date the project has involved over 7,500 people in 16 countries across seven continents.

Monumental geoglyphs have been constructed since 1998, forming a chain of 51 drawings on the earth visible from space. Outside Melbourne, in Geelong, a "Rhythms of Life" site was commissioned in association with the 2006 Commonwealth Games. In China the "Rhythms of Life" walls stretch 2.1 kilometres (1.3 mi).

In the book "Andrew Rogers Geoglyphs Rhythms of Life", author Eleanor Heartney, New York-based, award-winning art writer and independent art critic, describes Rogers' land art undertaking:

"The geographic and historic sweep of the works constructed as part of the Rhythms of Life project is unprecedented in its scale and ambition. Taken together, the geoglyphs have been erected in every kind of climate, and have responded to geographical environments as distinct as Nepal’s Himalayan Mountains, China’s Gobi Desert, the volcanic mountains of Iceland and the harsh Israeli desert."

According to Hannes Sigurdsson, Director of the Akureyri Art Museum in Iceland:

"The Rhythms of Life project by Australian artist Andrew Rogers is the largest contemporary land-art project in the world, forming a chain of stone sculptures, or geoglyphs, around the globe. Monumental geoglyphs have been constructed in ten countries to date: Israel, Chile, Bolivia, Sri Lanka, Australia, Iceland, China, India, Turkey and Nepal. Future locations will include the United States, United Kingdom, Eastern Europe and Africa. By completion, the project will have involved over 5,000 people on six continents. The Rhythms of Life sculptures are optimistic metaphors for the eternal cycle of life and regeneration, expressive and suggestive of human striving and introspection. The geoglyphs embrace a wide cultural vision that links memory and various symbols derived from ancient rock carvings, paintings and legends in each region; they punctuate time and extend history into the distant future while delving into the depths of our heritage in pursuit of the spiritual. The exhibition at the Akureyri Art Museum in Iceland is the first general survey of the project".

Lilly Wei, an independent curator based in New York City, writes:

"Rogers believes that accelerating environmental changes with their potentially catastrophic consequences are much less avoidable these days and therefore much more heeded. Hopefully, he is right. Since the inception of his geoglyphs, it has been one of the artist's purposes to point to the irreplaceable beauties of the earth, both existent and man-made. By creating contemporary megaliths as markers, Rogers insists on the need to preserve this natural and artistic heritage for ourselves and for the future".

Three examples of the 'Rhythms of Life' geoglyphs are:

1. "The Ancients" This geoglyph is derived from a "pictureglyph" of a pre-Columbian deity known as "El Señor de los Báculos" located in the Rio Loa area near Calama, Chile. The pictureglyph is attributed to the Tiwanaku (also spelled Tiahuanaco) culture that developed between the years 300 and 900 AD. The geoglyph is located at an altitude of 8,100 feet (2,500 m) above sea level, on the Llano de la Paciencia (Plain of Patience), 13 km from the town of San Pedro de Atacama.
  The stone walls forming this geoglyph, constructed from volcanic rock and clay, are 1,200 metres (3,900 ft) long.
  This image forms part of the pastoral cosmology. The sun cuts across this "pictureglyph" at the solstice.
2. "The Rhythms of Life" This geoglyph is located at 2,603 metres (8,540 ft) on the Cordillera de la Sal (Salt Mountains), which rise from the Llano de la Paciencia, and form the head of the Valle de la Luna (Valley of the Moon), a geological formation of lunar appearance, approximately 14 km from the town of San Pedro de Atacama.
3. "Ancient Language" This geoglyph is about 80 by 2.8 metres (262.5 by 9.2 ft) high, and is inspired by an Aguadan (700-900AD) petroglyph carved into stone at the Pampa Vizcachilla archaeological site, in the surrounding area of Yerbas Buenas, 20 km from the Rio Grande.

== Satellite imagery ==
Rogers' works are of such proportions that they have been captured in photographs taken by satellite from distances between 440 and 770 km (270 and 480 mi) above the earth's surface. They can be easily observed in Google Earth's satellite imagery which has been used to create a tour of the 'Rhythms of Life' Land art project.

== Works ==
=== Solo exhibitions and displays ===
- 2019—Scott Livesey Galleries, Armadale, Victoria, Australia: Kairos
- 2019—Dominik Mersch Gallery, Sydney, New South Wales, Australia: Frisson
- 2019—Deakin University Art Gallery, Burwood, Victoria, Australia: Retrospective Andrew Rogers Evolution
- 2018—National Gallery of Australia, Canberra, Australia: Andrew Rogers maquettes and Sculptures 1996–2016
- 2017—European Cultural Centre, Collateral Exhibition to the 57th Venice Biennale, Palazzo Mora, Venice, Italy: We Are
- 2017—National Gallery of Victoria, Melbourne, Australia: We Are
- 2017—Mossgreen Gallery, Armadale, Victoria, Australia: We Are
- 2015—Geelong Gallery, Geelong, Australia: Geoglyphs - the land art projects of Andrew Rogers
- 2015—McClelland Sculpture Park+Gallery, Langwarrin, Australia: Andrew Rogers A Retrospective -

Maquettes 1996–2015

- 2014—University of Sydney, Australia: individuals, donated from artist, found in front of the Faculty of Law Building
- 2013—Dag Hammarskjöld Plaza, City of New York, New York, USA: Individuals, May - September
- 2013—Elgiz Cagdas Sanat Müzesim, Istanbul, 18 April – 18 June
- 2012—Center for Contemporary Arts Santa Fe, New Mexico, USA: Rhythms of Life
- 2012—Aidekman Arts Center, Tufts University Art Gallery, Massachusetts, USA: Global Land Art: Projects by Andrew Rogers
- 2012—Hammer gallery, Zurich, Switzerland: Rhythms of Life
- 2012—Nevada Museum of Art, Nevada, USA: Andrew Rogers Contemporary Geoglyphs
- 2011—Art Gallery, Istanbul, Turkey: Andrew Rogers Time and Space
- 2011—Momentum, Berlin, Germany: Time and Space: Drawing on the Earth
- 2011—18th Street Arts Center, Santa Monica, California USA: Time and Space
- 2009—White Box Gallery, New York, USA: Andrew Rogers: Odysseys and Sitings (1998–2008)
- 2008—William Mora Galleries, Richmond, Australia
- 2007—Poprad, Slovakia: Rhythms of Life I-VII
- 2007—Akureyri Art Museum, Akureyri, Iceland: Rhythms of Life I-VII
- 2007—James Gray Gallery, Santa Monica, California USA
- 2007—William Mora Gallery, Richmond, Australia
- 2005—Victorian Arts Centre, Melbourne, Australia
- 2004—Grounds for Sculpture, New Jersey, U.S.A.
- 2004—Gomboc Sculpture Park, W.A. Australia
- 2003—Deakin University "Rhythms of Life" Survey Exhibition, Victoria, Australia
- 2002—Auronzo di Cadore, Italy
- 2002—Le Venezie, Treviso, Italy
- 2002—Mudima Foundation, Milan, Italy
- 1999—Boritzer Gray Hamano, Santa Monica, California, USA "Rhythms of Life"
- 1998—Embassy of Australia, Washington, United States of America, "Rhythms of Life"
- 1997—Lauraine Diggins Fine Art, Victoria, Australia, "Rhythms of Life"
- 1994—Meridian Gallery, Victoria, Australia "Of Freedom & Will"
- 1993—Meridian Gallery, Victoria, Australia "Mankind in the Gesture of an Individual"

=== Selected group exhibitions ===
- 2022—Sculpture by the Sea, Sydney, NSW, Australia
- 2021—Scott Livesey Galleries, Prahran, Victoria, Australia
- 2019—Sydney Contemporary, Sydney, NSW, Australia
- 2019—Desert x 2019, Parallel Project, Rhythms of Life, Yucca Valley, California, USA
- 2018—Sculpture by the Sea, Sydney, NSW, Australia
- 2018—Wynne Exhibition, Art Gallery of New South Wales, Australia
- 2017—Sculpture by the Sea, Bondi, Sydney, NSW, Australia
- 2017—Sculpture by the Sea, Barangaroo, Sydney, NSW Australia
- 2017—Mossgreen Gallery, Armadale, Victoria, Australia* 2016—Sculpture Inside, Sculpture by the Sea, Cottesloe, WA, Australia
- 2015—Sculpture by the Sea, Bondi, Sydney, NSW, Australia
- 2015—Gasworks, Victoria, Australia: From Nature* 2014—Sculpture By the Sea, Sculpture Inside, Cottesloe, WA, Australia
- 2014—Lorne Sculpture Biennale, Victoria, Australia
- 2013—Art Miami, Miami, Florida, USA
- 2013—Sculpture by the Sea, Sydney, NSW, Australia
- 2013—Sydney Contemporary, Sydney, Australia
- 2013—Pulse Art Fair, New York, USA
- 2013—Art Stage Singapore, Singapore
- 2012—Scope Basel, Switzerland
- 2012—The Wynne Exhibition, Art Gallery of New South Wales
- 2011—The Sculpture Foundation and the City of West Hollywood, California USA: Elemental
- 2011—Sculpture by the Sea, Sydney, NSW, Australia
- 2011—Sculpture by the Sea, Aarhus, Denmark
- 2011—Scope Basel, Switzerland
- 2011—Rassegna Internazionale Di Scultura Di Roma
- 2010—Sculpture by the Sea, Sydney, NSW, Australia
- 2010—Scope Basel, Switzerland
- 2010—Art Karlsruhe, Germany
- 2009—Yeshiva University Museum, New York, US
- 2008—Soho Galleries, Sydney, NSW, Australia
- 2007—Sculpture By the Sea, Cottesloe, WA, Australia
- 2007—Soho Galleries, Sydney, NSW, Australia
- 2007—Corniche Art Fair, Venice, Italy
- 2006—Soho Galleries, Sydney, NSW, Australia
- 2005—Soho Galleries, Sydney, NSW, Australia
- 2004—Soho Galleries, Sydney, NSW, Australia
- 2004—Geelong Art Gallery, Victoria, Australia
- 2003—Soho Galleries, Sydney, NSW, Australia
- 2002—Art Singapore - Contemporary Asian Art, Singapore
- 2002—Soho Galleries, Sydney, NSW, Australia
- 2001—SOFA Chicago, US
- 1998—Grounds for Sculpture, New Jersey, US
- 1998—La Trobe University, Victoria, Australia
- 1997—Sculpture at Heidelberg Medical Centre, Victoria, Australia
- 1994—4th Australian Contemporary Art Fair

=== Awards (finalist) ===
- 2018—Wynne Prize, Art Gallery of New South Wales
- 2014—McClelland Contemporary Sculpture Survey & Award, Langwarrin, Victoria, Australia
- 2012—Mt Buller Sculpture Award, Victoria, Australia
- 2012—Wynne Prize, Art Gallery of New South Wales
- 2012—McClelland Contemporary Sculpture Survey & Award, Langwarrin, Victoria, Australia
- 2011—Sculpture by the Sea, Sydney, NSW, Australia
- 2011—Sculpture by the Sea, Aarhus, Denmark
- 2010—Sculpture by the Sea, Sydney, NSW, Australia
- 2007—Contempora2, Sculpture Award at Docklands, Melbourne, Australia
- 2007—Sculpture by the Sea, Cottesloe, WA, Australia
- 2006—Sculpture by the Sea
- 2005—McClelland Contemporary Sculpture Survey & Award
- 2004—Chicago Navy Pier Walk
- 2004—Helen Lempriere National Sculpture Award
- 2003—McClelland Survey and Sculpture Park, Victoria, Australia
- 2002—Sculpture by the Sea, Sydney, NSW, Australia
