= Land art =

Art movement of the 1960s and 1970s

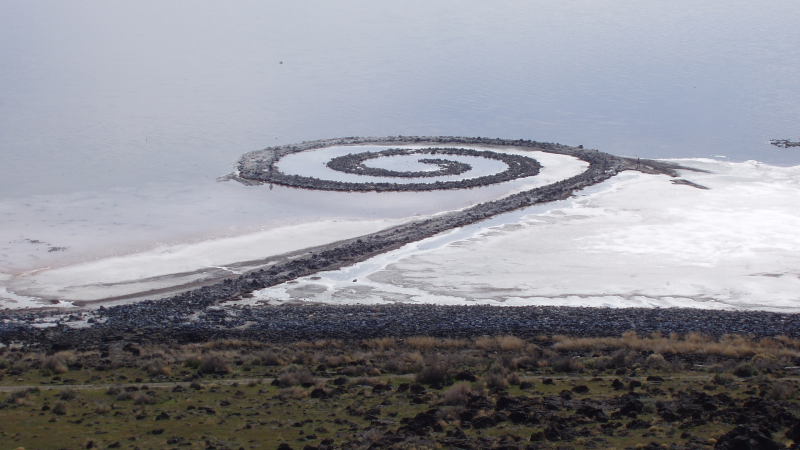
Spiral Jetty by Robert Smithson from atop Rozel Point, Utah, in mid-April 2005.

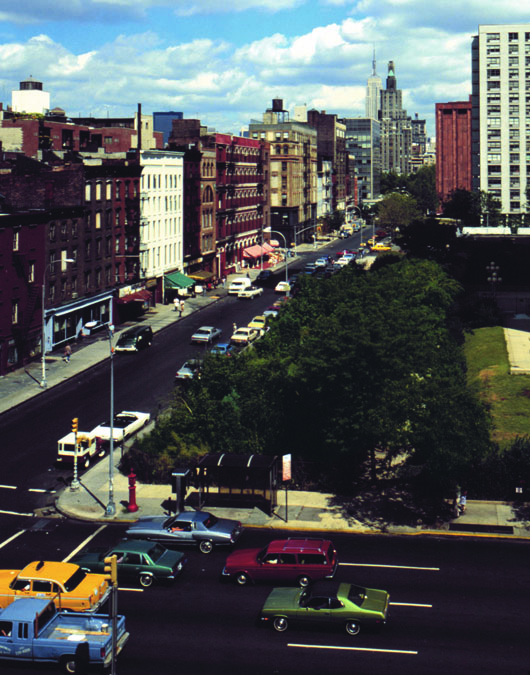
Time Landscape by Alan Sonfist, at LaGuardia and Houston Streets in Manhattan, 1965-present.

Land art, variously known as Earth art, environmental art, and Earthworks, is an art movement that emerged in the 1960s and 1970s, largely associated with Great Britain and the United States but that also includes examples from many other countries. As a trend, "land art" expanded the boundaries of traditional art making in the materials used and the siting of the works. The materials used are often the materials of the Earth, including the soil, rocks, vegetation, and water found on-site, and the sites are often distant from population centers. Though sometimes fairly inaccessible, photo documentation is commonly brought back to the urban art gallery.

Central concerns of the art movement include the rejection of the commercialization of art-making and enthusiasm with an emergent ecological movement. The beginning of the movement coincided with the popularity of the rejection of urban living and its counterpart, and an enthusiasm for that which is rural. Included in these inclinations were spiritual yearnings concerning the planet Earth as home to humanity.

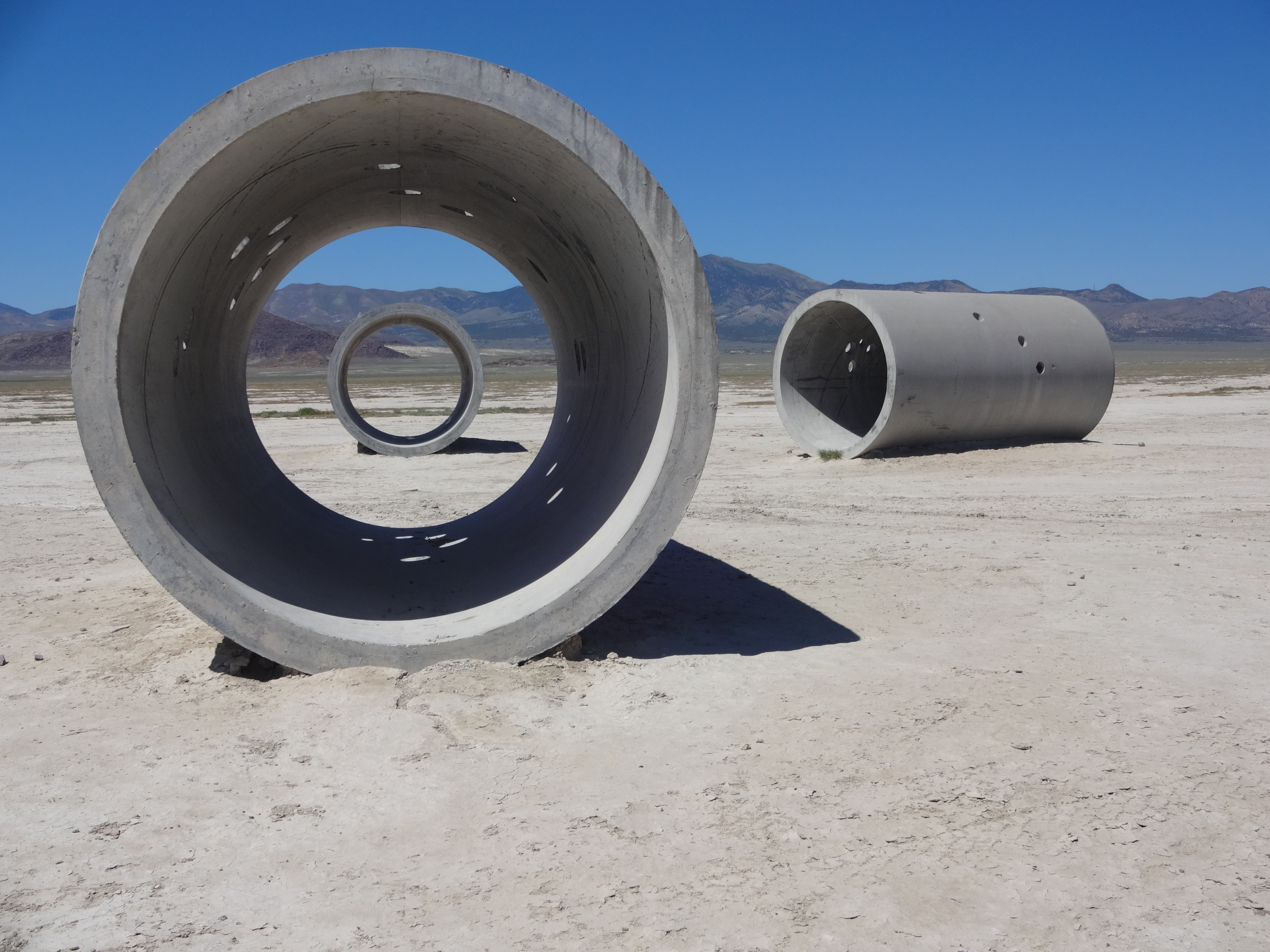
Sun Tunnels by Nancy Holt in Utah.

== Form ==
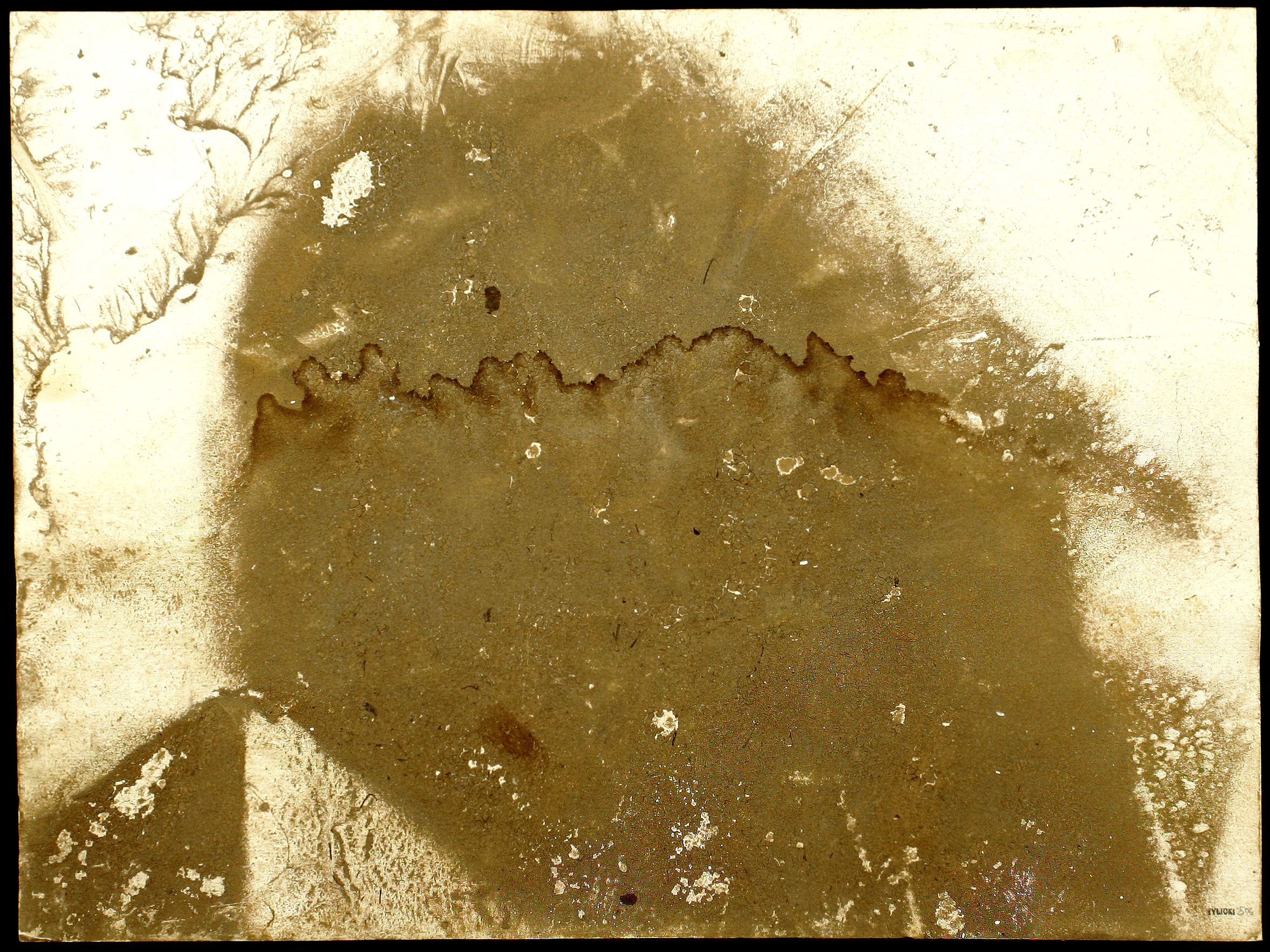
Museum paper board left on the bank of the river for 4 days. By Jacek Tylicki, S.W. of Lund, Sweden, 473 X 354 mm. 1981.

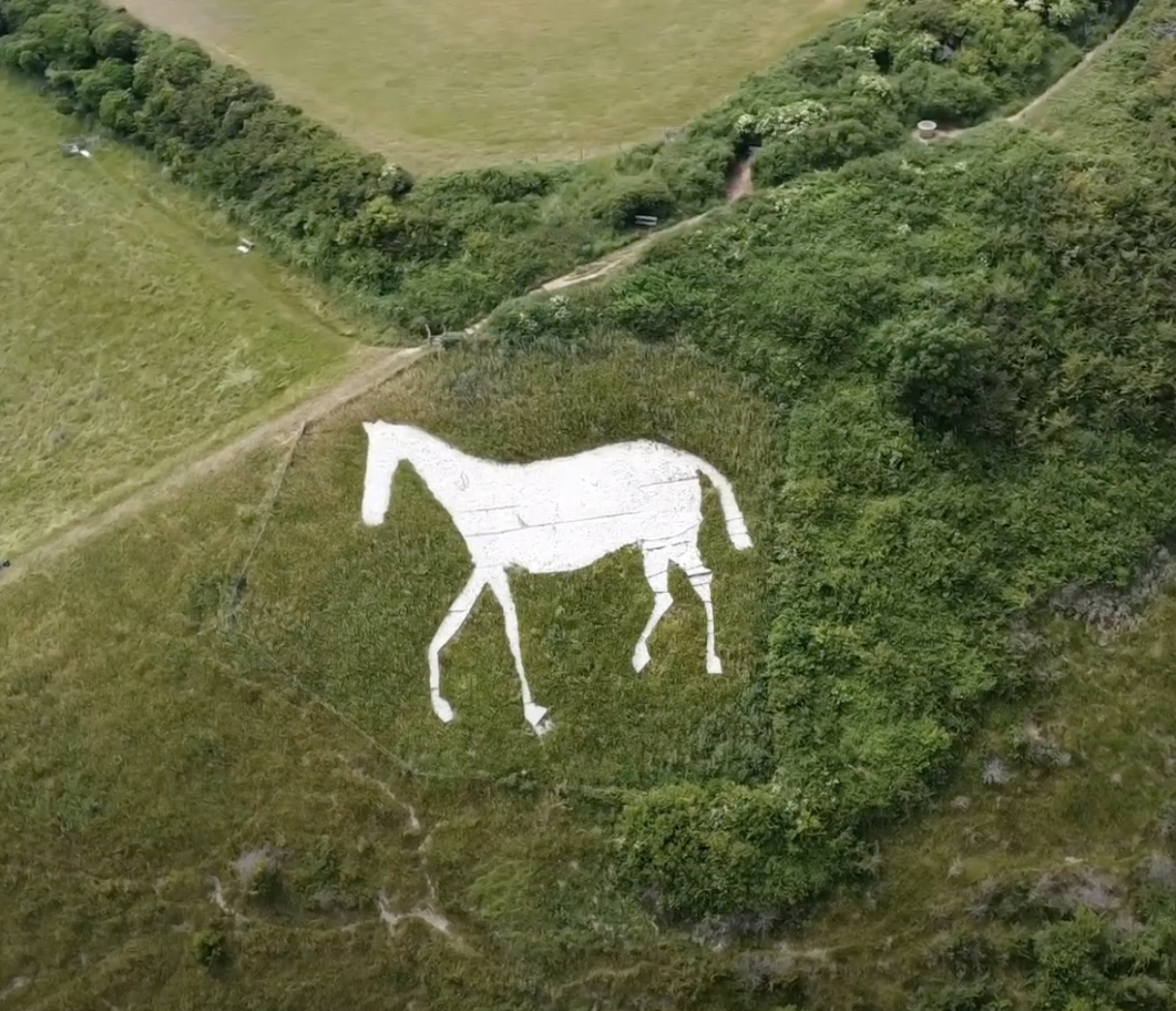
The Litlington White Horse, an earthwork that utilizes the natural geology of the South Downs as an artistic medium.

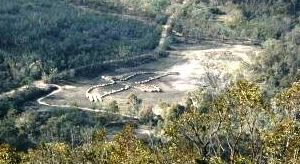
Bunjil, a geoglyph at the You Yangs, Lara, Australia, by Andrew Rogers. The creature has a wing span of 100 metres and 1500 tonnes of rock were used to construct it.

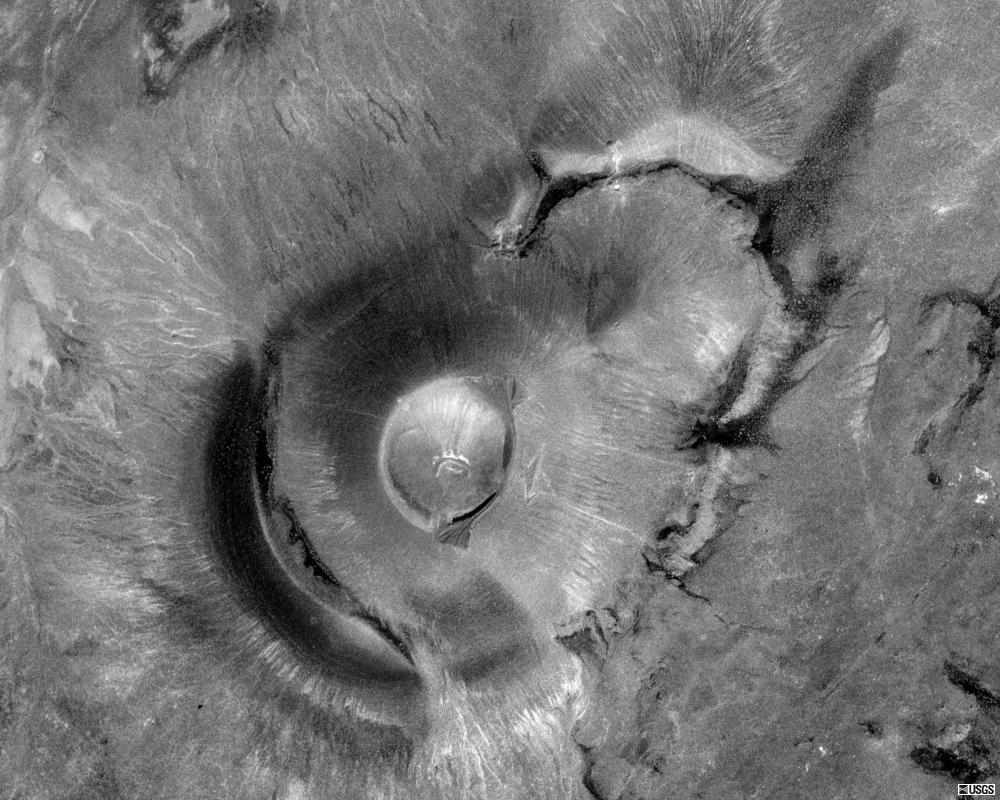
Satellite view of Roden Crater, the site of an Earthwork in progress by James Turrell, outside Flagstaff, Arizona.

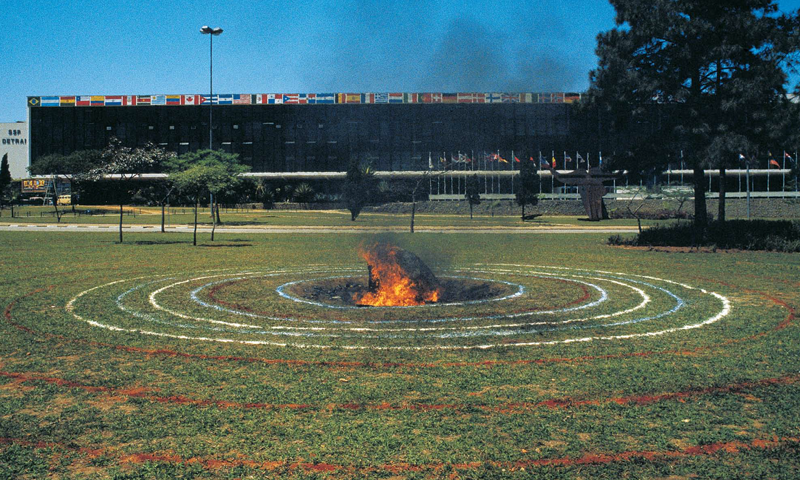
Meteorite by Milton Becerra in Ibirapuera Park, XVIII Biennial of São Paulo, Brazil (1985).

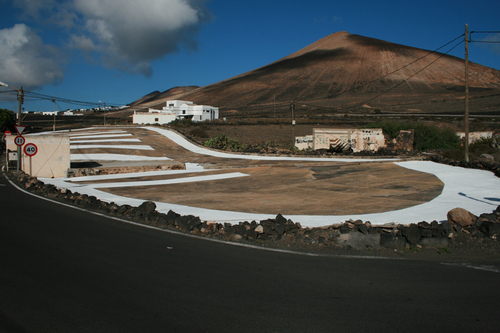
Side Effect XI, by Eberhard Bosslet, Tias, Lanzarote, (2008).

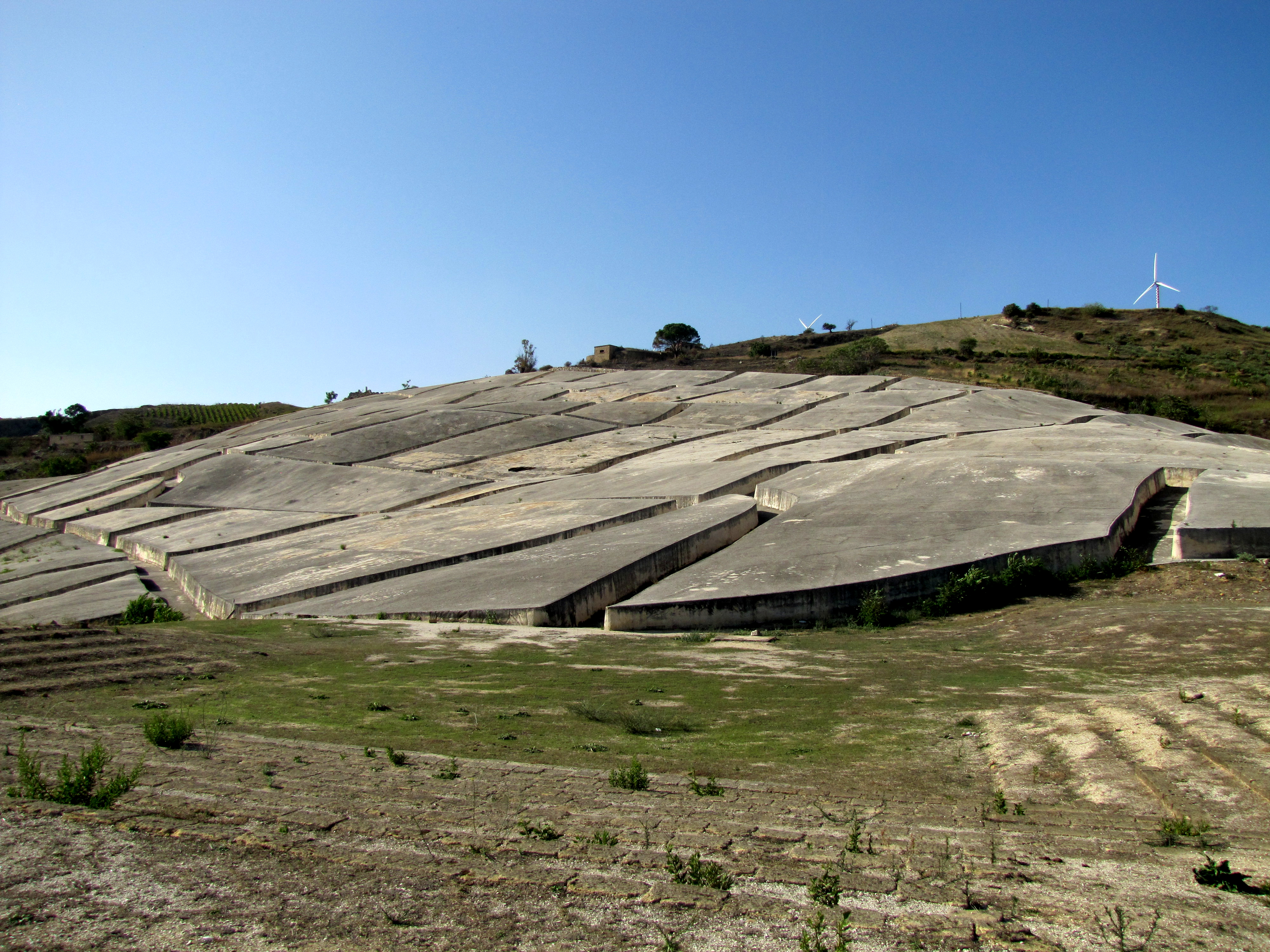
Grande Cretto, by Alberto Burri, Gibellina, (1984-1989).

Star Axis, looking north toward the entrance to the Star Tunnel: By Charles Ross, New Mexico, (1971–in progress).

The art form gained traction in the 1960s and 1970s as land art was not something that could easily be turned into a commodity, unlike the "mass produced cultural debris" of the time. During this period, proponents of land art rejected the museum or gallery as the setting of artistic activity and developed monumental landscape projects which were beyond the reach of traditional transportable sculpture and the commercial art market, although photographic documentation was often presented in normal gallery spaces. Land art was inspired by minimal art and conceptual art but also by modern movements such as De Stijl, Cubism, minimalism and the work of Constantin Brâncuși and Joseph Beuys. One of the first earthworks artists was Herbert Bayer, who created Grass Mound in Aspen, Colorado, in 1955.

While Land Art emerged as a formal movement in the 1960s, it draws on much older traditions of hill figures and geoglyphs. The Litlington White Horse in East Sussex is a 20th-century example of an earthwork created through the 'subtractive' method of cutting into the hillside to reveal the natural chalk beneath. As a site-specific work, its form is dictated by the slope of the downland, and it requires ongoing maintenance to prevent the surrounding vegetation from reclaiming the image—a key theme in the relationship between Land Art and the natural environment.

Many of the artists associated with land art had been involved with minimal art and conceptual art. Isamu Noguchi's 1941 design for Contoured Playground in New York City is sometimes interpreted as an important early piece of land art even though the artist himself never called his work "land art" but simply "sculpture". His influence on contemporary land art, landscape architecture and environmental sculpture is evident in many works today.

Alan Sonfist used an alternative approach to working with nature and culture by bringing historical nature and sustainable art back into New York City. His most inspirational work is Time Landscape, an indigenous forest he planted in New York City. He created several other Time Landscapes around the world such as Circles of Time in Florence, Italy documenting the historical usage of the land, and at the deCordova Sculpture Park and Museum outside Boston. According to critic Barbara Rose, writing in Artforum in 1969, he had become disillusioned with the commodification and insularity of gallery bound art. Dian Parker wrote in ArtNet, "The artist's ecological message seems more timely now than ever, noted Adam Weinberg, the director emeritus of the Whitney Museum of American Art. 'Since the '60s, [Sonfist has] continued to push forward his ideas about the land, particularly urgent right now with global warming all over the world. We need solutions to climate change not only from scientists and politicians but also from artists, envisioning and realizing a greener, more primordial future.'"

It has been noted that 2010's through 2020's environmental ideals and efforts can go against the intent of some land art to simply exist within the environment, subject to natural forces of entropy, such as Spiral Jetty. This appears to counter-intuitively promote environmental protection via these man made structures. Recent efforts to preserve land art bring into question its original purpose and openness to change (including disappearance). "The spiral jetty is surely a quaint monument…But the impulse to rescue and preserve it defines it as fine art like nothing else. Don't be surprised if someone wants to cover it with a plastic bubble-dome…A further irony– with plans for nearby oil-drilling upsetting artists, eco-activists and community people, preserving the unnatural jetty form as an icon of Earth art has become a wedge against extracting this natural earth product from the ground."

Other modern exhibitions, such as the Fly Ranch exhibition in 2021, focus on how their art affects their surroundings with modern environmental ideals in mind. This exhibition focused on making art pieces that also functioned as animal shelters, solar farms that don't take up huge spaces, planters, and water cleaners. This was accomplished by critically thinking about how they would implement their pieces, and by extension, the green energy they would use or represent.

In 1967, the art critic Grace Glueck writing in The New York Times declared the first Earthwork to be done by Douglas Leichter and Richard Saba at the Skowhegan School of Painting and Sculpture. The sudden appearance of land art in 1968 can be located as a response by a generation of artists mostly in their late twenties to the heightened political activism of the year and the emerging environmental and women's liberation movements.

One example of land art in the 20th century was a group exhibition called "Earthworks" created in 1968 at the Dwan Gallery in New York. In February 1969, Willoughby Sharp curated the "Earth Art" exhibition at the Andrew Dickson White Museum of Art at Cornell University, Ithaca, New York. The artists included were Walter De Maria, Jan Dibbets, Hans Haacke, Michael Heizer, Neil Jenney, Richard Long, David Medalla, Robert Morris, Dennis Oppenheim, Robert Smithson, and Gunther Uecker. The exhibition was directed by Thomas W. Leavitt. Gordon Matta-Clark, who lived in Ithaca at the time, was invited by Sharp to help the artists in "Earth Art" with the on-site execution of their works for the exhibition.

Perhaps the best known artist who worked in this genre was Robert Smithson whose 1968 essay "The Sedimentation of the Mind: Earth Projects" provided a critical framework for the movement as a reaction to the disengagement of Modernism from social issues as represented by the critic Clement Greenberg. His best known piece, and probably the most famous piece of all land art, is the Spiral Jetty (1970), for which Smithson arranged rock, earth and algae so as to form a long (1500 ft) spiral-shape jetty protruding into Great Salt Lake in northern Utah, U.S. How much of the work, if any, is visible is dependent on the fluctuating water levels. Since its creation, the work has been completely covered, and then uncovered again, by water. A steward of the artwork in conjunction with the Dia Foundation, the Utah Museum of Fine Arts regularly curates programming around the Spiral Jetty, including a "Family Backpacks" program.

Smithson's Gravel Mirror with Cracks and Dust (1968) is an example of land art existing in a gallery space rather than in the natural environment. It consists of a pile of gravel by the side of a partially mirrored gallery wall. In its simplicity of form and concentration on the materials themselves, this and other pieces of land art have an affinity with minimalism. There is also a relationship to Arte Povera in the use of materials traditionally considered "unartistic" or "worthless". The Italian Germano Celant, founder of Arte Povera, was one of the first curators to promote land art.

"Land artists" have tended to be American, such prominent American artists in this field included Carl Andre, Alice Aycock, Walter De Maria, Hans Haacke, Michael Heizer, Nancy Holt, Peter Hutchinson, Ana Mendieta, Dennis Oppenheim, Andrew Rogers, Charles Ross, Alan Sonfist, and James Turrell. Turrell began work in 1972 on possibly the largest piece of land art thus far, reshaping the earth surrounding the extinct Roden Crater volcano in Arizona. The most prominent non-American land artists are the British Chris Drury, Andy Goldsworthy, Richard Long and the Australian Andrew Rogers. Western United States was a significant location for land artists, as the open frontiers and deserts offered by the country were seen as canvas' or testing beds for land artists.

In 1973 Jacek Tylicki begins to lay out blank canvases or paper sheets in the natural environment for the nature to create art. Some projects by the artists Christo and Jeanne-Claude, who are famous for wrapping monuments, buildings and landscapes in fabric, have also been considered land art by some, though the artists themselves considered this incorrect. Joseph Beuys's concept of "social sculpture" influenced "land art", and his *7000 Eichen* project of 1982 to plant 7,000 Oak trees has many similarities to land art processes. Rogers' "Rhythms of Life" project is the largest contemporary land-art undertaking in the world, forming a chain of stone sculptures, or geoglyphs, around the globe – 12 sites – in disparate exotic locations (from below sea level and up to altitudes of 4,300 m/14,107 ft). Up to three geoglyphs (ranging in size up to 40,000 sq m/430,560 sq ft) are located in each site.

Land artists in America relied mostly on wealthy patrons and private foundations to fund costly projects or were commissioned by these patrons and foundations to create artwork; Walter de Maria's Lightning Field (1977) was commissioned by The Dia Art Foundation. With the sudden economic downturn of the mid-1970s and land art not being inherently marketable in the commercial art market, funds from these sources largely stopped. With the death of Robert Smithson in a plane crash in 1973, the movement lost one of its most important figureheads and saw a prominent decline.

Works of land art tended to take a long period of time to complete with many remaining unfinished. As Charles Ross continues to work on the Star Axis project, which he began in 1971. Michael Heizer in 2022 completed his work on City, and James Turrell continues to work on the Roden Crater project. In most respects, "land art" has become part of mainstream public art and at times the term "land art" is misused to label any kind of art in nature. Even if conceptually not related to the avant-garde works by the pioneers of land art.

The Earth art of the 1960s were sometimes reminiscent of much older land works, such as Stonehenge, the Pyramids, Native American mounds, the Nazca Lines in Peru, Carnac stones, and Native American burial grounds, and often evoked the spirituality of such archeological sites.

== Contemporary land artists ==
- Lita Albuquerque (born 1946)
- Betty Beaumont (born 1946)
- Milton Becerra (born 1951)
- Marinus Boezem (born 1934)
- Chris Booth (born 1948)
- Eberhard Bosslet (born 1953)
- Alberto Burri (1915-1995)
- Mel Chin (born 1951)
- Christo and Jeanne Claude
- Walter De Maria (1935-2013)
- Lucien den Arend (born 1943)
- Agnes Denes (born 1931)
- Jan Dibbets (born 1941)
- Harvey Fite (1903-1976)
- Barry Flanagan (1941-2009)
- Hamish Fulton (born 1946)
- Andy Goldsworthy (born 1956)
- Michael Heizer (born 1944)
- Stan Herd (born 1950)
- Nancy Holt (1938-2014)
- Peter Hutchinson (born 1930)
- Patricia Johanson (1940-2024)
- Junichi Kakizaki (born 1971)
- Dani Karavan (1930-2021)
- Maya Lin (born 1959)
- Richard Long (born 1945)
- Robert Morris (1931-2018)
- Vik Muniz (born 1961)
- David Nash (born 1945)
- Ugo Rondinone (born 1964)
- Dennis Oppenheim (1938-2011)
- Georgia Papageorge (born 1941)
- Beverly Pepper (1922-2020)
- Tanya Preminger (born 1944)
- Andrew Rogers (born 1947)
- Charles Ross (born 1937)
- Richard Shilling (born 1973)
- Nobuo Sekine (1942-2019)
- Michael Singer (1945-2024)
- Robert Smithson (1938-1973)
- Alan Sonfist (born 1946)
- Tang Da Wu (born 1943)
- James Turrell (born 1943)
- Jacek Tylicki (born 1951)
- Nils Udo (born 1937)
- Bill Vazan (born 1933)
- Hannsjörg Voth
- Strijdom van der Merwe (born 1961)

== See also ==
- Ecofeminist art
- Ecological art
- Ecovention
- Environmental art
- Environmental sculpture
- Geoglyphs
- Hill figure
- Land Arts of the American West
- Petroglyph
- Rock art
- Independent public art
- Site-specific art
- Tree shaping
