= Star Axis =

Earthwork sculpture by Charles Ross

- Artist: Charles Ross
- Year: 1971–
- Medium: Earth, sandstone, granite, concrete, bronze and stainless steel
- Movement: Land art, conceptual art
- Dimensions: 11 stories tall, 0.1 mile wide
- Location: 35.26445°N 105.08727°W
- Owner: Land Light Foundation
- Website: www.staraxis.org

Charles Ross, Star Axis. Looking north up the Star Tunnel; earth, sandstone, granite, concrete, bronze, stainless steel; 11 stories high, 0.1 mile wide; (1971–in progress).

Star Axis is an earthwork by American sculptor Charles Ross designed for observing the stars and considered to be a defining example of land art. The roughly eleven-story architectonic sculpture and naked-eye observatory is situated on a mesa in the eastern plains of the New Mexico desert. It incorporates five main elements that include apertures framing several earth-to-star alignments, which allow a visitor to experience them in human scale. Ross conceived the project in 1971, began construction in 1976, and as of fall 2022, had targeted 2025 for its completion. Art historian Thomas McEvilley places the work in the lineage of monuments of archaeoastronomy such as the Great Pyramids, Stonehenge, El Caracol, Chichen Itza and the 15th-century Ulugh Beg Observatory. Curator and writer Klaus Ottmann has described Star Axis as "a summary of Ross's lifelong pursuit of the dynamics of human interaction with light and the cosmos."

== Background ==
Charles Ross (born 1937) is known for conceptual sculpture that employs geometry, time, scientific concepts and natural processes. His art harnesses natural light and planetary motion in order to record and reveal optical, astronomical and perceptual phenomena. He initially studied physics and mathematics (BA, 1960) before turning to sculpture (MA, 1962) at University of California, Berkeley. As an artist, Ross emerged in the 1960s at the advent of minimalism and is considered a forerunner of "prism art." His bodies of work include: installations in which he choreographs solar spectrum moving through architectural spaces by way of large prism sculptures that he fabricates; "Solar Burns", created by focusing sunlight through lenses onto wooden planks; paintings made with dynamite and powdered pigment; and "Star Maps."

Many of the artists associated with land art, including Ross, were involved with minimalist and conceptual art and had a connection to Virginia Dwan and the Dwan Gallery. Ross's professional relationship with Dwan began in 1967 and included: exhibitions between 1968 and 1971 (when the gallery closed); their joint project, the Dwan Light Sanctuary (1996); and her longstanding financial support of Star Axis.

== Description and concept ==
Star Axis is a complex architectural sculpture that is roughly eleven stories high, one-tenth mile wide, and composed of earth, granite, sandstone, concrete, bronze and stainless steel. It is situated on a 400-acre site within a 76,000-acre cattle ranch in the New Mexico desert. The work and its views are carefully constructed to align with astronomical phenomena, recalling ancient structures that are also aligned to the sun and stars.

The sculpture's "Star Tunnel" is the central feature, a 147-step, nine-story stairway, exactly parallel to Earth’s axis. Ascending the Star Tunnel stairs, a visitor can "walk through" and experience all of the orbits of Polaris—the current north star—throughout the Earth’s 26,000-year cycle of astronomical precession. When a viewer enters the Star Tunnel at bottom, the aperture at the top appears to be the size of a dime held at arm’s length and frames the smallest circumpolar orbit of Polaris corresponding to the view in the year 2100 CE. As a visitor climbs the stairs, they can see increasingly larger views of the sky framing larger and larger circumpolar orbits of Polaris. The aperture is a 40-inch oculus—the width of the human field of peripheral vision when standing right in front of it. At this proximity to the aperture, at the top of the Star Tunnel stairs, it frames Polaris’s largest circumpolar orbit 13,000 years from now and 13,000 years in the past.

Charles Ross, Star Axis. Solar Pyramid with triangular entrance to the Hour Chamber; earth, sandstone, granite, concrete, bronze, stainless steel; 11 stories high, 0.1 mile wide; (1971–in progress).

The Star Tunnel is entered through an enormous excavation of two 30-foot-tall, curved sandstone walls rising up to an elliptical opening that traces the path Earth's axis draws throughout precession. The other chambers of Star Axis embody additional celestial phenomena. The relatively small "Equatorial Chamber" is located at the bottom of the Star Tunnel and frames the passage of the sun on the equinox through an opening at the top enabling viewers to also observe the stars that travel directly above the equator. The top third of the Star Tunnel continues into the 52-foot-high "Solar Pyramid," whose angles were determined by the summer and winter solstices. It casts shadows like a sundial, marking daily and seasonal sun movements on the bowtie-shaped, exterior "Shadow Field," which is bounded by the tracings of the longest shadow at winter solstice and the shortest at summer solstice. Inside the Solar Pyramid in the "Hour Chamber," which includes a 29-foot-high, 15˚ triangular aperture framing one hour of the earth’s rotation; in that time, any given star will take sixty minutes to arc from the opening’s left (west) edge to the right (east) edge, while Polaris remains at the apex due to the alignment of the structure.

Ross has called Star Axis a work of "earth/sky art," rather than land art, stating "this art, this architecture, is an instrument for perception—a place to sense how the earth's environment extends into the space of the stars." His concept involved gathering various star alignments in different time scales and building them into sculptural forms, so that enormous celestial cycles could be experienced and felt at human scale. In 1986, Michael Brenson described Ross's concept as "enabl[ing] a visual experience to involve the entire body. Walking through the tunnel and up the stairway would be, in effect, like walking into the eye of a telescope. The artist wants the natural observatory to be a doorway to the stars."

In 2021, Artforum critic Dan Beachy-Quick wrote of the effect of Star Axis, "It is this radical tension between the universe, the tool, and the human by which Star Axis gains its great power. The structure in the spare elegance of its geometry invokes the ancient temple, pyramid, ziggurat … the presence of something unfathomably larger than oneself."

== History and construction ==
Charles Ross, Star Axis. Looking north toward the entrance to the Star Tunnel, a stairway exactly parallel to Earth's axis; earth, sandstone, granite, concrete, bronze, stainless steel; 11 stories high, 0.1 mile wide; (1971–in progress).

Ross conceived Star Axis in 1971, as an outgrowth of his work on a series of drawings about the Egyptian pyramids and their star alignments, which piqued an interest in the geometry of earth-star alignments, particularly the south-to-north celestial pole. He spent the next five years making drawings, consulting with astronomers and engineers, and searching the American southwest for a place within open, vast land that suggested "standing at the boundary between the Earth and the stars." In 1976, he discovered the project's site in the New Mexico desert. While driving on backroads of a private ranch, he was approached by a cowboy on horseback whose father owned the vast expanse of land; he soon secured the use of a 400-acre parcel with the owner, W.O. Culbertson Jr., a former state representative, cattle rancher and member of the National Cowboy Hall of Fame, who to Ross's surprise, sparked to his idea for a naked-eye observatory. Ross told the New York Times's Kay Larson that he picked this site, "because the land and sky seemed equal in weight... This piece is about having your feet on the ground and your head in the sky."

Construction began in 1976, with the building of a five-mile dirt road. Between 1976 and 1980, Ross excavated a seven-story-deep half-cone out of the mesa, seeking to "enter the Earth to reach the sky." Since starting, he has alternated between summer oversight of construction and winters in New York. When at Star Axis, he lives on-site with his wife, artist Jill O'Bryan (and during the work's first decade, with his former wife, artist Elizabeth Ginsberg). The construction has generally been undertaken with small, four-to-six-person crews and local stonemasons, several of whom have worked on the project for decades.

Ross has contributed funding to Star Axis through sales of his other artwork, the support of patrons like Virginia Dwan (a sponsor since its inception), and donated building materials. In more recent years, the project has also been financed with foundational support from organizations including the Andy Warhol Foundation, John Simon Guggenheim Memorial Foundation, Someland Foundation and Thaw Charitable Trust. In 2017, Ross sold a large portion of his Manhattan loft to partially finance the nonprofit Land Light Foundation, directed by O'Bryan, which has raised money for the project and will maintain the site for perpetuity.

As of July 2026, Ross has stated that the work will be complete by winter 2026.
