= Milton Becerra =

Venezuelan artist

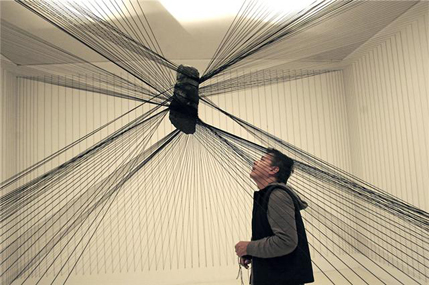
- Born: 10 August 1951 (age 75); Tachira, Venezuela
- Movement: In situ, Plastic Arts, Land art, Op art, Installation art, Environmental art, String sculpture

Milton Becerra (born 1951) is a Venezuelan artist who pioneered land art in Venezuela in the 1970s.

== Early works ==
He graduated from the Cristóbal Rojas School of Arts (1972) under the Jesús Soto promotion. From 1973 to 1980 Milton Becerra was assistant-partner in the workshops of the renowned masters Carlos Cruz-Diez and Jesús Soto. He participated in his first collective exhibition when he was still a student. He studied art trends such as Concrete, Neo, Kinetic, Generative and "Op-art". In 1973 he opened his first solo exhibition "Vibro-hexagonal Volume" that included a sound atmosphere presented at the Ateneo de Caracas, that won him the prize of the Third National Exhibition of Young Artists.

He applies this knowledge to the development of irregular shapes called Hexagon Geometry or "Hexagonometry", based on the arrangement of different modules in space based on Kasimir Malevich's "White Cube" theory, and Ludwig Wittgenstein's "Tractatus logico-philosophicus" concepts that investigates colors, their behavior in space and the division of forms through color ranges. On the resulting works, Venezuelan art historian Alfredo Boulton (1908–1995) wrote: “Milton Becerra's works characterize a concern about the volumes and strong structures, that accompany subtle chromatic features. We are, thus, in front of a solid object, but at the same time light and fragile.”

Concerned about nature and the enormous legacy of Venezuela's indigenous peoples, Milton Becerra is able, in his first solo exhibition, to fuse the traditions of Venezuelan primitive cultures with the modernity of the artistic trends of the time. Milton Becerra does not discriminate on the aesthetic aspects, on the contrary makes them coexist, transcending the artistic harmony and visual resources of primitive cultures with geometric abstraction and the Venezuelan artistic kinetic movement, relevant at that time.

Meteorite Ibirapuera Park, XVIII Biennial of São Paulo, Brazil (1985).

Three years later Milton Becerra presented at the Caracas Museum of Contemporary Art his work "Programmed Modules", where he expresses his concerns towards land intervention by photography. Under this context, in the 70s, the early works of Milton Becerra come into view, placed in suburban areas of Caracas, on the blurred boundaries between city and forest, or high pastures and the streambeds, or in the city's last streets and homes, or in the Colonia Tovar, or in La Mariposa dam. Although these were, at the time, actions and interventions, these pieces later became Photographic Series, and constitute—beyond themselves—his first plastic and poetic approach to the vision of nature and earth as sacred, conducive to mystical experiences and filled with the cultural memory of silenced or vanished peoples. Skulls of these vanished can be represented in coded ways, as in the theme of vanitas or in contemporary art, sometimes so marked by primitivism that the material takes precedence over the location. This is how Milton Becerra presented us in this way at the Montpellier Botanical Garden. This starting point characterizes later the context of his artworks. Milton Becerra is considered one of the pioneers of Land Art in Venezuela, a contemporary art movement that uses elements of nature or its environments to produce a reaction in the spectator observing the landscape presented and intervened by the artist.

== Land Art ==
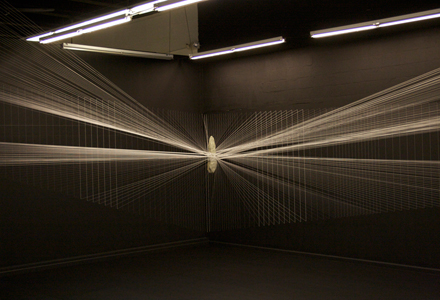
Ale'ya Durban Segnini Gallery Miami 2009.

Born in London, the European Land Art movement had extremely different concerns to those in Latin America. The Land Art in the old continent pursues to take the viewer to an isolated spot where nature dwells in itself, away from the hustle and influence of large cities. Latin American artists—and Milton Becerra has been consistent throughout his dilated career in this regard— intend Land Art to reach for our roots and become part of the soil that sustains us. Milton Becerra, concerned about the ecology, conducted at this stage works such as "A Blanket for the Meadow" in Caracas' residential area, Lomas de Prados del Este; and "Analysis of a Process in Time", in the El Valle parish, where he denounces the effects of pollution and deterioration of the landscape. Towards the 80s Milton Becerra relocated to Paris and developed a new perspective of his art, based on his research and perception of the Amazonian Yanomamo ethnicity customs. That is when his usual patterns and fabrics, impregnated with modernity, gave a twist that led to the development of his distinguishable Site-specific art, recognized anywhere in the world, from this artist born in Venezuela's Táchira state. The mixture of fibers and fabrics with other organic elements like rocks, led him to develop series as "Chin-cho-rro" (1995), "Gotas" (Drops 1990) and "Nidos" (Nests 1995). In each of these works the artist appeals to the concept, and then he interprets it and nourishes it with abstractionist and geometric forms, where the light waggling of inert bodies defy the laws of gravity and create a formidable artistic piece. Chin-cho-rro's and Esfera pre-colombina Site-specific art the Museum of Contemporary Art and Design in San José, Costa Rica (1995)—under the invitation of Ms. Virginia Pérez-Ratton (1950–2010) not only showed to the public Milton Becerra's interpretation of traditional hammocks used by indigenous groups, but also rested on them stones, as rigid bodies of those men and women who died of the Xawara endemic plague and had, as funeral beds, these pendulous webs.

== Environmental art ==
Milton Becerra knows the path that as an artist he is following, and proudly acknowledges that he is taking uncommon Venezuelan art to all latitudes. It is impossible for him not to feel attached to his country, especially his beloved Amazonas, with each piece he makes. Milton Becerra was also invited by Alfons Hug, coordinator of the collective exhibition "Art Amazon", organized by Germany's Goethe Institute during the first United Nations Conference on Environment and Development Earth Summit, ECO-92), at the Museum of Modern Art in Rio de Janeiro. For that exhibition he focused on the Upper Orinoco River, the Amazon Federal Reserve, the Yanomamo territory, and he immersed himself into an experiment, as a fully anthropological workshop, developing the theme "Xawara Yanomami – XXI Century". Between 1992 and 1994 the sample was presented at the Museum of Art in Brasilia, Brazil; the Ludwig Museum of Art Forum International, Aachen, Germany; Technische Sammlungen, Dresden, Germany; and Statliche Kunsthalle, in Berlin, Germany.

== Permanent monumental works ==
- Tepú-mereme, Pontevedra Museum, Galicia Spain (1996);
- Esfera pre-colombina, Museum of Contemporary Art and Design, San José, Costa Rica (1995);
- Nointel Lotus, Château Nointel, France (1994);
- Oro Doble Spiral, Kistermann family, Aachen, Germany (1994);
- Dorado constellation, Rohrbach Zement Museum, Dotterhausen, Germany (1991);
- O, Noa-Noa Foundation, Caracas, Venezuela (1990);
- O, Die Stimme in der Kunst Klinikverwartung, Bad-Rappenau, Germany (1989);
- Meteorite, Ibirapuera Park, XVIII Biennial of São Paulo, Brazil (1985);
- Homenaje a la constelación del águila y las cinco águilas blancas, Mariano Picon Salas Museum, Albarregas Park, Mérida, Venezuela (1985).

== Awards ==
- Omar Carreño conceptual art prize, College of Architects of Venezuela, Caracas (2014)
- AICA International Award for projection, Venezuela (2008)
- Honorable Mention EST92, Tijuana, México (1998)
- Distinction Art Salon, 50 Years Central Bank of Venezuela, Caracas (1990)
- Ephemeral Art First Prize, II Biennale de Guayana Jesus Soto Museum, Ciudad Bolivar, Venezuela (1989)
- "O” Klinikverwartung Acquisition Prize, Bad Rappenau, Germany (1989)
- Second prize III Biennial Sculpture Museum Francisco Narvaez, Porlamar, Venezuela (1986)
- First prize II Biennial Sculpture Museum Francisco Narvaez, Porlamar (1984)
- Salon Award for Young Artists House Guipuzcoana, La Guaira Venezuela (1983)
- Mariscal Ayacucho Foundation Venezuela, scholarship award to study leave in Paris (1980)
- Procurement IV National Art Salon of Young Artists, INCIBA Award, Caracas, Venezuela (1975)
- First Prize III Art Exhibition of Young Artists Gallery La Rinconada, Caracas, Venezuela (1973).

== Monographic ==
- Susana Benko, Artistic Education, Edition Larense, Venezuela (2009)
- "Analysis of a process in time", Foundation Cultural Chacao, Caracas, Venezuela (2007)
- Christine Frérot "Contemporary art from Latin America1990-2005" Edition L'Harmattan, (2005)
- Juan Carlos Palenzuela "Sculpture in Venezuela 1960 – 2002" Citibank, Caracas, Venezuela (2002)
- Paco Barragan "The art that comes" Editions group auctions XXI, Madrid, Spain (2002)
- Yvonne Pini "Fragments of memory Latin American artists think past" Edition Uniandes, Bogotá (2001)
- René Derouin "By a culture of territory" Editions l'Hexagone, Québec, Canada (2001)
- Juan Carlos Palenzuela "Ideas about the Visible" Edition in the care of the author, Caracas, Venezuela (2000)
- Enrique Viloria Vera "Milton Becerra- origins" Editions Pavilo, Caracas, Venezuela (1999)
- Vision of Latin American art in the Decade of 1980, UNESCO, Lima, Peru (1994)
- Alfredo Boulton "History of the painting in Venezuela" Edition Armitano, Caracas, Venezuela (1979)
- Roberto Guevara "Art for a new scale" Edition Lagoven, Caracas, Venezuela (1979
- Jorge Glusberg Young Generation" Argentina (1976).

== Publications reviews (selections) ==
- Christian Chambert, Konstuetenskaplis pag 38/39 Bulletin, Switzerland (1984)
- François Julien "Artmania" L'Officiel hommes Paris, France (1990)
- Berta Sichel "The New Past" Atlántica, Nº 6 Las Palmas, Grand Canarias (1994)
- Reynaldo Roels jr "Arte Amazonas" Humboldt Nº 112 Bonn, Germany (1994)
- Susana Benko "Milton Becerra – Identidad" Art Nexus Nº 27 Bogota, Colombia (1998)
- BIT – OIT International Labour Office sectorielles 1 edition Geneva, Switzerland (1999)
- Juan Carlos Palenzuela "Milton Becerra Galería IUFM Confluences" Art Nexus Nº 37 Bogota (2000)
- Carlos Acero Ruiz "El Mundo Mágico de Milton Becerra" ARTes Nº 3 St. Domingo, R.Dominican (2002)
- Antonio Zaya, Portafolio "Ximetriamazonica" Atlántica – Las Palmas, Grand Canarias (2003)
- "Homenaje à Pierre Restany " exposición Milton Becerra- Update nº 4 – París, Francia (2003)
- Amalia Capoto "Milton Becerra-Lost Paradise" Arte al día Nº 102 – Miami, EE.UU (2004)
- Marina D. Whitman "Milton Becerra" Surface Design volumen 29 Nº1 pag / 50-51– Miami. (2004)
- Lorenzo Dávalos "Silente perplejidad" revista GP N°8, pag /arte-Caracas, Venezuela (2007)
- Patricia Avena Navarro "Arqueología de lo visible e invisible" Arte al día N°138 –Miami, EE.UU (2012).
