= Charles Ross (artist) =

American sculptor (born 1937)

- Born: December 17, 1937 (age 88); Philadelphia, Pennsylvania, US
- Known for: Sculpture, Land art, public art, drawing, painting
- Notable work: Star Axis, Dwan Light Sanctuary, Harvard Business School Chapel, Year of Solar Burns
- Spouse(s): Jill O'Bryan (1995–current), Elizabeth Ginsberg (1977–1986)
- Awards: Guggenheim Fellowship, Andy Warhol Foundation
- Website: charlesrossstudio.com

Charles Ross, Star Axis. Looking north toward the entrance to the Star Tunnel, a stairway exactly parallel to Earth's axis; earth, sandstone, granite, concrete, bronze, stainless steel; 11 stories high, 1/10th mile across; (1971–in progress).

Charles Ross (born 1937) is an American contemporary artist known for work centered on natural light, time and planetary motion. His practice spans several art modalities and includes large-scale prism and solar spectrum installations, "solar burns" created by focusing sunlight through lenses, paintings made with dynamite and powdered pigment, and Star Axis, an earthwork built to observe the stars. Ross emerged in the mid-1960s at the advent of minimalism, and is considered a forerunner of "prism art"—a sub-tradition within that movement—as well as one of the major figures of land art. His work employs geometry, seriality, refined forms and surfaces, and scientific concepts in order to reveal optical, astronomical and perceptual phenomena. Artforum critic Dan Beachy-Quick wrote that "math as a manifestation of fundamental cosmic laws—elegance, order, beauty—is a principle undergirding Ross’s work … [he] becomes a maker-medium of a kind, constructing various methods for sun and star to create the art itself."

Ross has exhibited at venues including the Museum of Modern Art, PS1, Dwan Gallery, Museum of Contemporary Art, Los Angeles, and Museum of Contemporary Art, Chicago. His artworks are collected by the Whitney Museum of American Art, Centre Georges Pompidou, and Los Angeles County Museum of Art, among other institutions. In 2011, he was named a Guggenheim Fellow. He lives and works in SoHo, Manhattan and New Mexico with his wife, painter Jill O'Bryan.

== Background ==
Ross was born December 17, 1937, in Philadelphia and grew up in the nearby suburb of Glenside. He studied physics for two years at Penn State before transferring to the more liberal University of California, Berkeley in 1958. In 1960, he graduated with a BA in mathematics, but was already moving towards art after taking a sculpture course to fulfill a liberal-arts requirement; he was attracted to the medium as a means of making abstract ideas physical.

After earning an MA in sculpture from Berkeley in 1962, he spent the early years of his career in New York, initially producing assemblage works concerned with balancing shape and form. He was one of the original artist residents to join the historically significant artist cooperative at 80 Wooster Street organized by Fluxus founding member George Maciunas; the cooperative has been credited by cultural observers with the development of Manhattan's SoHo neighborhood into an art-world hub. After moving to San Francisco, Ross began his longstanding investigation of light in 1965, with the creation of large-scale prisms assembled in his warehouse studio.

He returned to New York in 1967 and began showing at the noted Dwan Gallery—prominent in both the minimalism and land-art movements—after being introduced to Virginia Dwan by conceptual artist Sol LeWitt, whom critics cite as an influence in Ross's work. Ross showed there until 1971 when the gallery closed, and continued a professional relationship with Dwan that culminated in their joint 1996 project, the Dwan Light Sanctuary. In the early 1970s, he began showing at other galleries, including the John Weber Gallery in New York, and conceived his large-scale earthwork project, Star Axis, which is still under construction. At that time he also purchased a larger, top-floor studio on Wooster Street, where he made some of his first solar burns on the roof. In subsequent years, he has shown at Franklin Parrasch in New York and Parrasch Heijnen in Los Angeles.

Charles Ross, The Colors of Light, The Colors in Shadows; prism column: acrylic and optical fluid, 100" x 14" each side); painted white column: wood, 90" x 12" each side); John Weber Gallery, 1979.

== Work ==
Critics note in Ross's work a juxtaposition of aesthetic and conceptual appeal with the immediacy of natural forces that he records and displays. It has been described as a "cocktail of science and art," employing sculpture as an instrument for perception. Curator and writer Klaus Ottmann has written that all of Ross's work emanates from "an early and enduring excitement about geometry" and a "preoccupation with the substance of light, the existence of its physical, quantum, and metaphysical expressions." Ross's major bodies of work consist of prism sculptures, Solar Burns using focused sunlight, the earthwork Star Axis, solar spectrum installations, explosion works made with powdered pigments, and "Star Maps."

=== Early work and prism art ===
Ross's early work varied in both focus and materials, and included sculpture, environments, and collaborations with the experimental Judson Dance Theater and choreographer Anna Halprin. This work often showed an interest in process and motion—recurring themes in his art—as in Room Service (1963), a large, dynamic sculpture he created for a Judson Dance performance, which evolved in response to the movement of dancers.

In 1965, after a detailed dream about building a prism, Ross made a complete break from his assemblage work. He began using acrylic to construct transparent geometric forms of varying shapes filled with liquid that functioned as prisms—his first foray into the light-themed work that would be the enduring focus of his career. He showed prism works in solo exhibitions at Dilexi Gallery (1965, San Francisco), Park Place Gallery (1966, New York), and Dwan Gallery (1968, 1969, 1971). His early prisms were modestly scaled, minimal variations on cubes that functioned as geometric objects and perceptual vessels, displaying different views and perspectives within their shapes. The subsequent "Prism Walls" (tall prism columns set side-by-side with space between them) and Coffin (1968)—a large pentagonal, human-sized piece—were increasingly complex in terms of their fragmentation and dislocation of perspectives. A 2020 Artforum review of the early prism works described them as offering a threshold into "a mode of contemplation that is exceedingly elemental, nearly imperceptible … Ross's humble objects are an art of philosophic passivity. They let enter into them the forces that enter us all [and] give us a glimpse of the cosmic realities that more truly house our lives."

In his later work with prisms, Ross became interested in them as transmitters of light rather than objects. These works spread white light into the solar spectrum, creating a dynamic interaction between the prisms, the sun's movement across the sky, and viewers, notably in the Dwan Light Sanctuary (1996). The sanctuary is a structural artwork located in Montezuma, New Mexico, on the campus of the United World College, and a collaboration with Virginia Dwan and architect Laban Wingert. The circular structure has an open interior and a ceiling that is twenty-three feet in height. It includes design elements that echo traditional religious architecture, but was conceived by Dwan as a secular space and contains no specific symbology. Ross contributed solar spectrum artwork in the form of 24 enormous prisms strategically placed in the structure's apses and skylights, as well as astronomical design elements such as the building's orientation. Aligned with the sun to project different seasonal spectrum events and to evolve throughout the day with the earth's turning, the prisms cast immense rainbows in slashing patterns and shades that move around the room's curved plaster walls.

Charles Ross, Year of Solar Burns (March 20, 1992–March 20, 1993), 366 painted wooden planks, 10" x 20", with solar burns; permanent installation, Chateau d'Oiron, France, 1994.

=== Solar Burns ===
In the 1970s, Ross introduced a new body of work, his "Solar Burns" which employed an opposite approach to the prisms by focusing light rather than spreading it. His process has been described as that of a catalyst—creating an instrument that removed his own presence as artist and enabled material representations of the raw power of sunlight "drawn by the sun itself." Beginning on the autumnal equinox of 1971, he meticulously recorded a year's worth of daily solar burns on carefully positioned, fire-treated white planks of wood exposed to sunlight passing through a large lens. Each day's burn resulted in charred impressions with delicate, multidimensional feathered edges reflecting variations in weather patterns, day length, and factors related to the orientation of the Earth's axis in time. He titled the 366-plank work Sunlight Convergence/Solar Burn: The Equinoctial Year, September 23, 1971–September 22, 1972 and showed it in a solo exhibition at John Weber Gallery. According to art historian Thomas McEvilley, pop artist Andy Warhol brought The Rolling Stones' Mick Jagger to the opening, where they searched out the planks corresponding to their birthdays. Warhol later commissioned Ross to create a burn series of the month corresponding to his astrological sign, Leo.

Ross's most well-known solar burn installation is Year of Solar Burns (1994), commissioned by the French Ministry of Culture for permanent installation in the fifteenth-century Chateau d'Oiron in the Loire Valley. It includes 366 solar burns (one per day) hung on the site's walls and a bronze inlay in the floor, which reflects and recreates Ross's discovery that laying each solar burn end to end for the year formed a double spiral. In later solar burn pieces, he has explored various mathematical phenomena, including the number 137 (coined "the God number" by physicist Richard Feynman), magic squares, and the Fibonacci sequence. Art in America's Jan Ernst Adlmann wrote that Ross's 2012 exhibition "Solar Burns" (Gerald Peters Gallery) translated "mathematical mystifications" and a purely scientific demonstration of "the sun’s flaring majesty into a work of abstract, searing beauty."

=== Star Axis ===
In 1971, Ross conceived of his large-scale earthwork project, Star Axis, an architectonic sculpture and naked-eye observatory situated on the eastern plains of New Mexico that Klaus Ottmann regards as "a summary of Ross's lifelong pursuit of the dynamics of human interaction with light and the cosmos." The complex and massive sculpture comprises five architectural chambers and is roughly eleven stories high, one-tenth mile across, and composed mainly of granite and sandstone. The sculpture and its views are carefully constructed to align with astronomical phenomena such as the vernal equinox sunrise, echoing ancient structures that are also aligned to the sun and stars. Ross discovered the site in 1976 and secured its use with the owner of the land, W.O. Culbertson Jr., a former state representative, cattle rancher and member of the National Cowboy Hall of Fame. He began work on Star Axis that year, and has since alternated between summer oversight of the construction and winters in his New York studio; as of late 2021, work was ongoing and reported to be near completion.

The chambers and apertures of Star Axis frame several earth-to-star alignments, revealing a human scale within enormous celestial cycles. For example, as visitors ascend the central "Star Tunnel", a 147-step stairway parallel to Earth’s axis, they can experience all of the circumpolar orbits of the north star, Polaris, throughout the 26,000-year cycle of axial precession. The "Star Tunnel" is mostly open to the sky with a circular aperture at the top framing all of Polaris's circumpolar orbits. The sculpture's other chambers include: an "Equatorial Chamber" that frames the passage of the sun on the equinox through an opening at the top; the "Hour Chamber," which frames one hour of the earth's rotation through a triangular opening; and the to-be-completed "Shadow Field," which holds all of the shadows cast throughout the year by another feature, the "Solar Pyramid," a tetrahedron built to solstice alignments.

Dwan Light Sanctuary; collaboration of Virginia Dwan (concept), Charles Ross (solar spectrum artwork and astronomical alignments), Laban Wingert (architecture); 24 acrylic prisms filled with optical fluid, 1996, United World College, Montezuma, New Mexico.

=== Solar Spectrum and other commissions ===
Ross has produced more than twenty permanent, site-specific commissions, including works in Japan, Australia, and throughout the United States. He created Rock Bow (1983) for a Chicago rapid-transit station—a 22-foot prism column that refracts sunlight entering the station through a dome with a 100,000-pound Indiana limestone base. His solar spectrum commissions use multiple large-scale prisms strategically placed to choreograph sunlight through their spaces. Lines of Light, Rays of Color (1985, Plaza of the Americas, Dallas) is a solar spectrum installation with 36 acrylic and optical fluid prisms, each weighing about 450 pounds, located in the skylights and window walls of an atrium. Other installations include Light, Rock and Water (1986, San Diego), a wall of prisms installed on a polished granite pedestal rising from a black-tiled pool of water; and Light Line (1987, San Francisco Airport), a 76-foot-long prismatic sculpture suspended across a large skylight, which projects the solar spectrum into the terminal in continually changing patterns.

In 1992, Ross created Solar Spectrum, commissioned by architect Moshe Safdie for his round, non-denominational The Class of 1959 Chapel at the Harvard Business School. The installation uses a tracking system that realigns its prisms to meet morning and afternoon light; its light-emanating solar spectrum—along with that of the Dwan Sanctuary—have been described as counterpoints to the Rothko Chapel's light absorbing murals, all three serving as spaces of contemplation. Ross also created Spectrum 12 (1999) for Saitama University in Japan, and Spectrum 8 (2004) for the National Museum of the American Indian (NMAI); the NMAI work features a "ladder" of eight prisms within a tall atrium window that cast spectrums into a circular space designed for ceremonial performances. The installation Spectrum Chamber, (2018, Museum of Old and New Art, Tasmania) was a collaboration with architect Nonda Katsalidis. It employs a Corten steel cube with notches cut into it that house thirteen prisms refracting sunlight into rainbows across white porcelain-tile interior walls.

=== Films and other work ===
Ross made two films in the 1970s: the 25-minute Sunlight Dispersion (1971) and the 8-minute Arisaig (Solar Eclipse) (1972). The New York Times described the former as combining scientific filming technology with "a truly artistic appreciation of colors" in its recording of prismatic changes of hue on a cup, chair, room and hand.

In the 1970s and 1980s, Ross also introduced new bodies of drawings and paintings. His performative "Explosion Drawings" were visualizations of the interaction of light and matter at the smallest scale, which referenced Richard Feynman's diagrams demonstrating principles in quantum mechanics. He created them by sprinkling powdered pigments in twelve spectrum colors on top of dynamite Primacord and fuses, then detonating them, causing the pigments to be thrust down into the paper and upward in dispersed clouds. His "Star Maps" (1975/1986) are two-dimensional maps of the universe forming a human-sized sphere when assembled, which he created from 428 photographs from an atlas of the stars covering the celestial sphere from pole to pole; he showed them in the exhibition "Lo Sapzio" at the Venice Biennale in 1986.

== Recognition ==
Ross's work belongs to the public collections of the Berkeley Art Museum, Herbert F. Johnson Museum of Art, Indianapolis Museum of Art, Los Angeles County Museum of Art, Musée National d'Art Moderne (Centre Pompidou, Paris), Museum Kunstpalast (Germany), National Gallery of Art, Nelson-Atkins Museum of Art, Nevada Museum of Art, New Mexico Museum of Art, Walker Art Center, Weisman Art Museum, and Whitney Museum, among others.

He has received fellowships and grants from the Guggenheim Foundation, Thaw Charitable Trust, and Andy Warhol Foundation, among others. Ross as featured in the film Troublemakers: The Story of Land Art (2015).
