= Lárus List =

Lárus H. List (born 27 February 1956, in Reykjavík), is an artist resident in Háteigur, Akureyri in the north-east of Iceland. List worked in the Akureyri Art Museum for six years under the guidance and tuition of then director Haraldur Ingi Haraldsson. List has been described by Morgunblaðið art critic Bragi Ásgeirsson as "a colourful child of nature who goes his own way carried off on a spark of natural talent".

In 2007 the U.S. supermarket chain Wal-mart initiated legal proceedings against List to retain the domain wa1mart.com, claiming that the artist is typosquatting on a domain similar to its own walmart.com. The only difference between the two domains is a one digit '1' replacing the letter 'L'.

List, who is represented by British Lawyer Graham Ross, claims that the domain was registered in relation to a painting entitled Wa1m-ART which was displayed in Kling og Bang Gallery in Reykjavík. The painting is based on Leonardo da Vinci's Mona Lisa. List said the idea behind his Mona Lisa-based artwork was to criticize American greed and cultural hegemony and that Wal-Mart's lawsuit has proven his point.
