= Alan Sonfist =

American artist

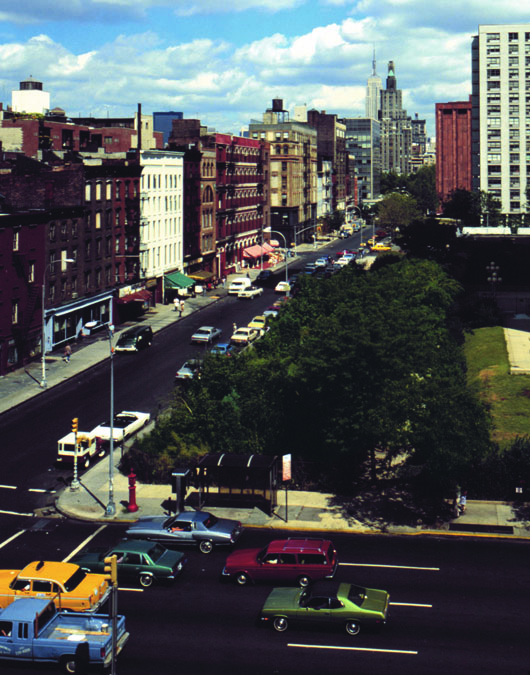
- Time Landscape of New York
- Born: March 26, 1946 (age 80); Bronx, New York City
- Known for: Sustainable Art
- Movement: Environmental Art, Land Art

Alan Sonfist (born March 26, 1946) is a New York City based American artist best known as a "pioneer" and a "trailblazer" of the Land or Earth Art movement.

He first gained prominence for his "Time Landscape" found on the corner of West Houston Street and LaGuardia Place in New York City's Greenwich Village. Proposed in 1965, "Time Landscape" the environmental sculpture took over ten years of careful planning with New York City. It was eventually landmarked by the city. It has often been cited as the first urban forest of its kind. More recently, Sonfist has continued to create artworks within the natural landscape, inaugurating a one-acre (4,000 m^{2}) landscape project titled "The Lost Falcon of Westphalia" on Prince Richard's estate outside Cologne, Germany in 2005.

In Nature: The End of Art, environmentalist Jonathan Carpenter writes that "To review the public sculptures of Alan Sonfist since the 1960s is to witness the reemergence of the socially aware artist. His sculptures reassert the historical role of the artist as an active initiator of ideas within society. Each of his artworks fundamentally redefine what sculpture is, who the artist is, and how art should function for its public."

== Life and career ==
Sonfist was raised in the South Bronx. His work derives from an early childhood anxiety towards deforestation. As the Financial Times writes: "One of the pioneers of environmental art, Sonfist's passion for nature was triggered by his childhood nearby a hemlock forest, which has now died. 'I watched it disappear as people tried to improve upon it,' he tells me sadly. A gentle soul in a pinstriped suit and straw trilby, he believes nature is safest 'when left to be like it is'."

Attending Ohio State University, he studied with Gestalt psychologist Hoyt Sherman. His research there concerned the language of visual culture and its relationship with human psychology. He later attended Hunter College, where he received a master's degree in art. Later, he went on to pursue a Research Fellowship in visual studies at MIT, Cambridge, MA.

Beginning with his first major commissioned work, "Time Landscapes" in Greenwich Village, NYC, Sonfist received critical acclaim for his innovative use of urban spaces to design havens of nature and green art. His early work in the 1960s and 1970s helped pioneer the burgeoning movement of site-specific sculpture. After his breakthrough Time Landscape of New York, Sonfist gradually built a reputation as a father of the environmental art movement, presenting a new and unique harmony between ecology and artistry. In 1971, Joshua Taylor, Director of the American Museum of Art, wrote of "Autobiography of Alan Sonfist", a one-person exhibition at the Smithsonian Institution, "... some--like Alan Sonfist ... have reacted to a cosmic consciousness by returning to specific nature in its smallest detail. For art in America, the landscape has meant freedom and expansion, or, when useful, discipline and concentration. But once the artist took possession of his environment, the natural bounty of America was never far from the surface of his art."

His 1971 work, Leaves Met the Paper in Time complemented Time Landscape in its themes. The piece consists of sheets of dyed paper paired with real leaves of the same shade. While the paper retained its color, the leaves lost theirs over time, which Eleanor Heartney explains as "suggesting the apparent triumph of technology over nature while memorializing the original state of the now shriveled leaves."′

His first major publication was on his lecture series at the Metropolitan Museum of Art in 1969. Sonfist edited "Art in the Land: A Critical Anthology of Environmental Art," which was republished in Europe and Asia due to its reception by critics and artists alike. He has been included in multiple major international exhibition catalogs such as the Dokumenta, the Venice Biennale, and the Paris Biennale. Recently, Dr. Robert Rosenblum wrote an introduction to Sonfist's "Nature: The End of Art" which was distributed by Thames and Hudson, and published by Gil Ori.

Throughout his career, Sonfist has given several keynote speeches for public and private events and organizations such as Pennsylvania State University, the Southern Sculpture Conference, and the American Landscape Association in Miami. He has been a featured speaker in numerous symposiums at major institutions and conferences including the Metropolitan Museum of Art, the Boston Museum of Fine Arts, the Midwest College Association, the U.N. Ecological Conference in São Paulo, Brazil, and the Berlin Ecology Conference. Sonfist has been a featured lecturer at numerous major institutions including the Whitney Museum of Art, the Nelson-Atkins Museum of Art, and the Museum of Contemporary Art of Chicago.

In 1987 he was invited to Italy to carry out his land art project at the Gori Collection, Circles of time

Sonfist has received major awards and grants from private and governmental organizations including the National Endowment for the Arts, the Graham Foundation for Art and Architecture, the Chase Manhattan Bank Foundation, and the U.S. Information Agency. Sonfist's works are included in many international public collections such as Skulpturen Park Köln (Cologne Sculpture Park) in Germany and Villa Celle, in Tuscany, Italy. His work is also featured in collections of major institutions including Metropolitan Museum of Art, the Dallas Museum of Art, the Princeton University Museum, and the Museum of Modern Art – New York City, The Whitney Museum, and the Ludwig Museum in Aachen, Germany.

Some of his most notable solo exhibitions include "The Autobiography of Alan Sonfist," at the Museum of Fine Arts in Boston, "Alan Sonfist Landscapes" at the Smithsonian American Art Museum, "Trees" at the High Museum in Atlanta, GA, and "Trinity River Project" at the Dallas Museum of Fine Arts.

A few of his commissions include, but are not limited to: "Lost Falcon of Westphalia," commissioned by Prince Richard of Germany, "Time Landscape of Indianapolis," commissioned by the Eiteljorg Museum Of American Indians and Western Art, and "Circles of Time," on the Gori Estate in Florence, Italy, and "Birth by Spear," in Florence. Today, he continues to promote sustainable energy and strives to raise awareness for global climate change with his international projects. Recently, Sonfist collaborated with Green City Planners in Pori, Finland and Tampa, Florida to create green public spaces.

== Time Landscape ==
Sonfist's breakthrough work, Time Landscape, was New York City's first urban forest. The juxtaposition of the pre-Colonial forest inside a modern-day city epitomizes the environmental conscience that Sonfist is known for.

In his essay "The New Economics of Environmental Art," Jeffrey Deitch wrote of the piece:

Alan Sonfist's New York York City-wide Time Landscape (1965-present), most visible to the art world in its segment at the corner of La Guardia Place and Houston Street, is an example of the artwork as a major urban-design plan. This ambitious and carefully researched undertaking consists of a network of sites throughout New York City's five boroughs, where sections of land have been restored to the way they might have appeared in the seventeenth century, before the advent of urbanization. Sonfist spent over ten years developing the project and finally pushing it to fruition. To complete the La Guardia Place site, he had to weave his way through community groups, local politicians, real estate interests, several arms of city government, art patrons, and their lawyers. It was only after shaping alliances with influential neighborhood politicians and agreeing to important compromises with community groups that Sonfist finally brought Time Landscape to completion.

== Pool of Virgin Earth ==
A sealed clay pool filled with virgin earth was placed on top of toxic soil in Lewiston, New York. The seeds were naturally blown in by the surrounding environment and the pool developed into a small oasis of the natural habitat. Eventually, the park system used this method to cover the entire site.

== Nature / Culture Monument of Tampa Florida ==
Curtis Hixon Sculpture Park

He focuses not only on a place of beauty in the center of an urban landscape, but also on its history, incorporating features of the natural landscape such as indigenous trees and plant life, as well as inanimate objects. The whole is a "sculpture" that is immediately noticed but that works well with its surroundings. Unlike the stark contrast of, say, a geometric steel sculpture, Sonfist's work blends in.”

== Birth By Spear ==
Birth by Spear (2010) reintroduced the original olive forest to Tuscany. Mr. Sonfist researched the indigenous olive trees along and trees which would have coexisted with them two thousand years ago. Surrounding the forest are Renaissance terracotta tiles that were specifically fired in kilns from the 14th century. The spear at the center of the environmental landscape is an allegory for Minerva giving birth to the olive tree by thrusting a spear into the earth. Inscribed on tiles were comments from the community of Tuscany, young to old, expressing their meaning of the olive.

== Earth Monuments ==
From 1971 to 2012, Mr. Sonfist completed a series of drillings known as ‘Corings’ or Rock Monuments’. Each artwork was completed at locations near urban centers allowing viewers to visualize the hidden inner structure of the earth below them. Several rock monuments were created for permanent installation in museums and institutions including the Pérez Art Museum Miami and Museum of Contemporary Art Chicago.

== Paris - La Defense ==
=== L’Histoire Naturelle Et Culturelle De Paris ===
In 1991, Mr. Sonfist was invited to propose a public park in Paris - La Defense as part of an urban renewal movement in Paris, France. He proposed a series of environmental sculptures representing the cultural and natural history of Paris. Each monument visualized the original vegetation that existed before urbanization of the city. In one of the monuments, stone quarried from the same site as Notre Dam is used to define the perimeter of a proposed wetland to be created adjacent to the Seine river.

== Lost Falcon of Westphalia ==
The Lost Falcon of Westphalia was created to represent the transformation from the last ice age to the contemporary forest. The artwork is an allegory for the perils of climate change as seen through the vanishing and migrating species of flora. Trees are planted within a neolithic fortification shaped like a native falcon.

“The artist makes reference to the peregrine falcon, which – much like the seedlings planted within its silhouette – can no longer be found in this area, despite having previously lived here for over 100,000 years. He not only points to the disappearance of the species, but also the lost unity of man and nature. As a domesticated hunting bird for thousands of years, the falcon is also a symbol of this traditional symbiotic relationship. The dirt wall that forms the bird’s outline is also a reference to early history: the earliest evidence of settlements in this region are Celtic ringforts (ca. 700 BC), which utilized similar earth walls for protection. Another point of reference are the monumental ancient dirt and stone paintings (around Nazca, Peru, ca. 700 BC, and in Cerne Abbas/England), which are also only fully visible from above.”

== Burning Forest of Aspen Colorado ==
In the 1980s, Mr. Sonfist's interests turned towards global warming and its effect on the world. The Burning Forest of Aspen is part of series of artworks that explore the extreme droughts of the western part of the United States. Each artwork creates a monument of the trees that have been destroyed by the forest fire. Within each charred tree, seeds from the trees can be found sealed away for future generations to germinate.

Incorporating burned remnants of aspen trees from a forest fire near Aspen, Colorado, Alan Sonfist’s Trees of Aspen (2008) is a work of quiet grandeur that attests to both the fragility and resiliency of nature in the face of man–made and natural disasters. In stark contrast to the characteristically grey–white bark of live aspen trees, the sparsely spaced trunks in this composition are charred black and missing their leaves and branches. These monumental tree trunks, permanently preserved in their state of decay, seem to tower over the viewer as ghost–like reminders of destruction and death.

== Current works ==
Alan Sonfist's more recent works include the Circles of Life, in Kansas City, the Disappearing Forest of Germany, in Cologne, and the Endangered Species of New England in Lincoln, Massachusetts, part of the deCordova Museum and Sculpture Park.

In 2017, Sonfist completed his Island of Paradise—in collaboration with architect Marco Brizzi and ecologist Carlo Scoccianti—in Tuscany, Italy:

Similar in vein to Time Landscape, the island becomes a metaphoric beacon within the swelter and cacophony of cultural production. However, Sonfist's work goes far beyond simple environmental or social commentary. To only observe either Time Landscape or Paradise as a hologram of what once existed before, or as an environmental life-raft within the tumult of urbanization, would represent a failure to see the works as the progressive, evolving landscapes that they are, and the impetus for change that they spark. To look at the dates of Time Landscape (1965-present), one can understand that the work is a dynamic, ever-adapting piece that is subject and meant to change. In the same way, Paradise will grow and transform with the environment into a naturalized configuration, while offering a haven for wildlife and an important stopover on the arduous migration of birds between Europe and Africa each year.

Today, Sonfist continues to promote his message of ecological sustainability and respect for the fragility of nature in each of his green art projects.

== Legacy ==
"The concept of a year round natural microcosmic forest, which would contain plants and trees indigenous to pre-colonial New York is fresh and intriguing and is desperately needed for our city." – Ed Koch, Former New York City Mayor

"After making art of quiet distinction for over 30 years, Alan Sonfist suddenly finds himself close to the spotlight. His concern for the fragility of nature, rather than for its sublimeness or monumentality, makes him a forerunner of the new ecological sensibility." – Michael Brenson, New York Times

"Alan is a pioneer of narrative environmental art on a grand scale." -Joshua Taylor, former director of the National Collection of Fine Art

Few artists have had such an unswerving, or generative, interest in the landscape (physical, social, historical) that surrounds us. Alan Sonfist is that rare species of artist- not just a pioneer in a particular form or approach, but a real trailblazer whose ideas have remained consistent, and consistently interesting, over the course of an entire career. No history of post-war art would be complete without an acknowledgement of his achievement.

— Jeffrey Kastner, Cabinet Magazine

== Selected publications ==
- Sonfist, Alan; Becker, Wolfgang; Rosenblum, Robert (2004), Nature, the end of art: environmental landscapes, Distributed Art Publishers

== See also ==
- Alan Sonfist Climate Change Art
- Climate Change Art
- Earthworks
