= Jill O'Bryan =

American artist

- Born: 1956 (age 69–70)
- Education: New York University, San Francisco Art Institute, Macalester College
- Known for: Drawing, public art
- Spouse: Charles Ross
- Website: Jill O'Bryan website

Jill O'Bryan, The Shape of the Sound of Breath, graphite and oil stick on Bhutan Mitsumata rice paper, 16 x 32", 2019.

Jill O'Bryan (born 1956) is an American contemporary artist whose work draws upon breath, bodily movement and the natural environment in order to examine the experience of being, time and place. She is most known for her "Breath Drawings," in which she records each of her breaths with an individual mark thousands of times, and her ground rubbings (frottages), which document her physical engagement with the New Mexico desert mesa. Southwest Contemporary wrote, "O’Bryan’s artmaking is not an act of representational picture-making but a practice of accumulating the residue of recorded time and place through the physical actions of her body. Her process is performative, specifically located in time and space, and records moment-to-moment interactions with the elements."

O'Bryan has exhibited in drawing, artist-book and other surveys at the Zimmerli Art Museum, Kemper Art Museum, Katonah Museum of Art, Hafnarfjör∂ur Centre of Culture and Fine Art (Iceland), New Mexico Museum of Art and National Gallery of Art, as well as through a commission from The Phillips Collection. She lives and works in SoHo, Manhattan and New Mexico with her husband, artist Charles Ross.

== Education and career ==
O'Bryan was born in 1956 in Chicago. She received a BA in art and English literature from Macalester College in Minnesota in 1978, and studied at the Leo Marchutz School of Painting and Drawing in Aix-en-Provence, France while an undergraduate. In 1990, she earned an MFA from the San Francisco Art Institute, then moved to New York City with the help of a Marie Walsh Sharpe Space Program fellowship (1991–92).

Over the next decade in New York, O'Bryan studied art theory and criticism at New York University with a focus on feminist performance art, the body and identity, earning a PhD in 2000. She also began to exhibit her work, appearing in group shows at Exit Art and ABC No Rio, among other venues. Her early work moved from more traditional landscape painting to abstracted, internalized landscapes, before turning toward the process-oriented mark-making for which she has gained recognition. In her later career, she has had solo exhibitions at Gallery Joe (Philadelphia, 2012), Center for Contemporary Arts (Santa Fe, 2017), Texas State Galleries (2018), Margarete Roeder Gallery (New York, 2018, 2019) and Zane Bennett Contemporary Art (Santa Fe, 2022).

In addition to creating art, O’Bryan has written the book, Carnal Art: Orlan's Re-facing (2005), about the French artist Orlan, and published articles in Art Journal, n.paradoxa, The Drama Review, and Women and Performance: A Journal of Feminist Theory.

Jill O'Bryan, Element Painting: Green (Water), watercolor on Bhutan Mitsumata rice paper, 64" x 110" inches, 2020.

== Work and reception ==
Writers have characterized O'Bryan's work as meditative, spare and minimalist, rigorous and performative. Working at both micro and macro levels, she incorporates intimate, primal human experiences (breath, embodiment, movement) within expansive physical and philosophical considerations (time and space, the elements, land and sky, interconnectedness). Her artmaking has centered on practices—often involving personal endurance—that mobilize her body, determine and regulate her breathing or sensory contact with the ground, and make tangible the experiences of being, the passage of time (human and geologic), and the immensity of landscape.

=== "Breath Drawings" ===
O'Bryan began creating "Breath Drawings" in 2000. The drawings involve counting and recording her breaths (one inhale and one exhale) with individual graphite marks, during meditations that can last several hours and take place over days, weeks, months or years, depending on the size and scope of the drawing. The marks, which vary in form across different drawings, are sometimes made next to one another and sometimes on top of one another. They become durational records—intimate visual and tactile archives of the universal experiences of embodiment and interdependence on the environment, transferred to paper. Her first breath drawing, 40,000 Breaths Breathed Between June 20, 2000 and March 15, 2005, took nearly five years to complete.

In her "Tonglen Breath Drawings" (2011–12), O'Bryan drew upon the concept of Tonglen breathing, a Buddhist practice of compassion in which practitioners breathe in another's pain, transform it, and breathe out healing. In these smaller works (e.g., 18,200 breaths between 4/1/2012 and 4/19/2012), she layered marks atop one another 20 times (equating to 20 breaths) until the rice paper became incised and frayed under the weight of the accumulated graphite; critic Edith Newhall described the resulting surfaces as resembling, "square, monochromatic pieces of a woolly patterned textile."

In 2019, O’Bryan began producing work that involved listening to her breath while meditating, then imagining the shape of the sound and creating those shapes. These works included her watercolor, acrylic and pencil series "Breathing into the Moon" and "Breathing into the Sky" paintings, both of which suggest universal laws and relationships of the cosmos through simple shapes (triangles, squares, rippling concentric circles) or patches of white resembling clouds and craters. In a 2022 Artforum review, Dan Beachy-Quick wrote, "O’Bryan attends to the fundamental elements of earthly life. Hers is an attention that attunes not only to the wondrous matter of the world … but to the mystical geometries that bind this planet together, and us to it."

Jill O'Bryan, nm.1.17 (Frottage), graphite on paper, 120" x 72", 2017.

=== Frottages ===
O’Bryan's ground rubbings, or frottages, represent a more outward-focused aspect of her work. She began these highly physical drawings in 2006 as a way to connect to and record her corporeal interactions with the New Mexico desert land. They were made by laying out large sheets of white paper on the mesa, then lying on top of the paper and making rubbings with chunks of graphite to reveal impressions and pull out the texture of the rocks below. Reviewers have likened these works (e.g., the 12-foot-tall, scroll-like Untitled #10, 2008 or NM.1.22, 2022), variously, to human skin or X-rays, topographical maps or entire landscapes, grave-rubbings, and Australian Aboriginal drawings. They have suggested that her mark-making in these drawings embeds the landscape into paper (rather than describing it), facilitating its organic emergence from the white surface. Paul Ardenne described the marked paper as "both the surface of inscription and of exchange … equivalent to a situation of intercession: art makes nature speak, and nature makes art speak."

In her 2017 exhibitions "Mapping Resonance" (Center for Contemporary Art) and "Inside Nature and Time" (Mayeur Projects, with Charles Ross), O’Bryan presented frottages alongside a new, related body of work involving impressions made of metates—flat rocks with hollowed, oblong depressions formed by grinding grains on top of them. She created the "Metate Paintings" by filling the rocks with India ink or tea, then laying rice paper into them overnight. They have been described as soft, defuse and fluid, organic demarcations of black, grey, and sepia that evoke expanding stars or time; she exhibited them horizontally, on platforms placed at a slight elevation from the gallery floors. These shows also included a series of circular and conical, downward-pointed plaster vessels, which captured light and reflected it outward and skyward; they allude to both drought and the potential for replenishment.

=== Public artworks ===
In 2015, O'Bryan was commissioned by The Phillips Collection to create the outdoor sculpture one billion breaths in a lifetime in Washington, DC. The sculpture consists of reflective, polished chrome text of the work's title, in script. "One billion" represents O'Bryan's calculation of the breaths a person would take in a long life of roughly 97 years.

She has also created two related billboard works located between Las Vegas and Santa Fe on I-25 (formerly Route 66), each consisting of black text on a bright yellow background. The first, A Billion Breaths (2013), read "To breathe 1 billion breaths you must live 97 years, 309 days, 6 hours, 51 minutes, 40 seconds." The second, created during the COVID-19 pandemic in 2021, read: "7.8 billion of us breathing together right this moment."

== Collections ==
O'Bryan's work belongs to the Brooklyn Museum, Colby College Museum of Art, Davis Museum, National Gallery of Art Library, New Mexico Museum of Art, and the Sarah-Ann and Werner H. Kramarsky Collection, among other collections.
