= Fred R. Kline =

American art historian, writer, poet and sculptor (1939–2021)

- Fred R. Kline at Dwan Light Sanctuary, June 2018
- Born: November 3, 1939; Hagerstown, Maryland
- Died: September 11, 2021 (aged 81); Santa Fe, New Mexico
- Education: San Francisco State University (BA, MA)

Fred R. Kline (November 3, 1939 – September 11, 2021) was an American art historian, writer, poet, sculptor, private art dealer and public gallerist in Santa Fe, New Mexico. He was known for his discoveries of lost art, including paintings, drawings and sculpture by Old Masters as well as 19th and 20th-century American and European artists. Many of his discoveries have been acquired by prominent museum, corporate and private collections around the world.

Kline called himself an "art explorer", one who brings an informed eye and open mind to a sleuth-like adventure of acquiring vanished masterpieces and restoring their identities (see link below:New York Times, 4.2.2002:"An Art Explorer Finds the Real Creators of Works"). He unearthed notable works by important artists in auctions, estate sales, antique and art galleries, and in the most unlikely resale shops and flea markets. He stressed evidence-supported connoisseurship, intuition and imagination, and a qualitative eye in analyzing art that rests final identification of an artist's work on signature comparative details. He cited as influential mentors: art historian connoisseurs Bernard Berenson (who was also in partnership with noted fine art dealer Sir Joseph Duveen) and Sir Kenneth Clark; philosopher and scientist Albert Einstein (a distant cousin); mythologist and teacher Joseph Campbell; art critic Robert Hughes; and fine art dealer, connoisseur and philanthropist Eugene Victor Thaw.

== Early life and career ==
Born in Hagerstown, Maryland, Kline's youth was spent in the U.S. east coast and in San Antonio during the 1940s–1950s. He served in the United States Marine Corps 1960–62 and was stationed in Japan and Southeast Asia during early reconnaissance for the coming Vietnam War. He earned a B.A. in English and a M.A. in creative writing from San Francisco State University (1968), studying with James Schevill, Kay Boyle, Wright Morris, Rod Serling, Eric Hoffer, James Liddy, among others. He also held teaching positions at Columbus College of Art & Design English Department (1968–72) and Cornell University English Department where he was also associate director of university relations working with President Frank Rhodes (1979–80).

At the invitation of U. S. Poet Laureate Josephine Jacobsen, Kline recorded selections in 1975 of his poetry at the Library of Congress (http://lccn.loc.gov/95770418) from "I, Dodo"(1968), "Crazy Love"(1970), and "Birthsongs"(1972), three of his four books of poems. During the 1960s, as a young writer, Kline corresponded with Conrad Aiken, Norman Mailer, Peter Matthiessen, and Norman O. Brown.

Kline moved to Santa Fe, New Mexico, with his family in 1980 to begin his career as a private art dealer. Within a year, he had discovered a painting by George Inness, the 19th c. American landscape painter, the sale of which purchased his first house there. Some of his initial collecting and dealing interests included American Indian Art, and he preferred to repatriate sacred objects back to the tribes. Several objects returned to the Onondaga and Seminole were documented in the books "Wisdomkeepers" and "Travels in a Stone Canoe".

His discoveries of lost art have been featured twice in the New York Times; (and "A Poem by Wild Bill Hickok," 1986 ); Art & Antiques ("You Never Know: An Ongoing Search for Lost Art in America," Feb.1989); Esquire ("Art Goes to Wall Street," July 1989); and in the art history textbook Framing America: A Social History of American Art by Frances Pohl, which highlighted and illustrated his discovery of the ca. 1530 Aztec-Spanish (Indochristian) sculpture "La Virgencita del Nuevo Mundo" as among the first New World works of art. Among notable collections that hold Kline's discoveries are: Thaw Collection of Master Drawings at The Morgan Library; J. Paul Getty Museum; Metropolitan Museum of Art; Jenness Collection of Master Drawings at Clark Art Institute; Leeds Museum, England; Frances Lehman Loeb Art Museum at Vassar College; and the Aga Khan Collection of Old Master Drawings.

Kline's discoveries included: • Old Master and 19th century European paintings by Jan Brueghel the Elder (2-both included in Klaus Ertz, Brueghel Catalogues Raisonnes), Pier Francesco Mola, Jan van Goyen, Eugène Delacroix, and Sir Edwin Landseer. • Old Master and 19th-20th century European and American drawings. Old Master drawings: Leonardo da Vinci (Private Collection, Santa Fe—see reference below to "Leonardo's Holy Child"), Baldassare Peruzzi (Getty Museum), Andrea del Sarto (Aga Khan Collection), Annibale Carracci (Private Collection), Frans Snyders (Thaw Collection), and others. 19th & 20th c. drawings: Joseph Anton Koch (Thaw Collection, http://corsair.themorgan.org/cgi-bin/Pwebrecon.cgi?BBID=247404), John Martin (Jenness Collection), Julius Schnorr von Carolsfeld (in reference to "La Bella Principessa", mistakenly attributed to Leonardo da Vinci: http://www.prnewswire.com/news-releases/150-million-la-bella-principessa-mistaken-identity-or-fraud-104562279.html), Evelyn de Morgan (Jenness Collection), Vincent van Gogh (Private Collection), Eugène Delacroix (Private Collection), Raphaelle Peale (Private Collection), James Peale (Private Collection), George Bellows (Private Collection), and Robert Motherwell (Thaw Collection), and others. • A folio of unknown works collected by H. S. Ede, regarding French artist Henri Gaudier-Brzeska (1891-1915), containing rare and unknown drawings, unknown photographs including his last photograph before dying in World War I, letters, and the original H. S. Ede manuscript of Savage Messiah. The Edes Gaudier-Brzeska collection is now in the permanent collection of Leeds Museum, Leeds, England. • Nineteenth & Twentieth century American paintings, highlighted by an unprecedented 29 "lost" works by George Caleb Bingham (1811-1879)—all were previously unlocated, and all were unsigned as was Bingham's custom. The new discoveries appear in the updated and revised, since 2005, George Caleb Bingham Catalogue Raisonne, of which Kline is founder, director-editor (www.GeorgeCalebBingham.org), a project now supported by The Riverbank Foundation, Kansas City, MO (https://www.riverbankfoundation.org). Included in the GCBCR, and of particular importance, are two of Bingham's river-themed paintings: "Baiting the Hook" (his first river genre, 1841, Petersburg, VA), and "Young Fisherman, Hudson River Palisades" (his final river-themed painting and his only known Hudson River School genre, 1855, New York). And also James Peale, George Inness (2), Thomas Nast, William James Hubard (2), Thomas Flintoff (2), Julian Onderdonk (10), Robert Onderdonk, Forrest Bess, and others.

A memoir of Kline's art discoveries, ``Leonardo’s Holy Child ~The Discovery of a Leonardo da Vinci Masterpiece: A Connoisseur's Search for Lost Art in America’’ was published May 10, 2016 by Pegasus Books, New York & London (http://www.pegasusbooks.com/books/leonardos-holy-child-9781605989792-hardcover).

Kline served as Art Historian on the international Leonardo da Vinci DNA-Project, which is under the sponsorship of Lounsbery Foundation, J. Craig Venter Institute and Rockefeller University, and is directed by Jesse Ausubel of Rockefeller University. The mission of the LDV-DNA Project is to extract, study and collate through microbiological and forensic methods evidence of Leonardo's DNA, gleaned from his drawings, paintings, codices, and even his two possible grave sites in France. The goal of this imaginative quest is finally to discover Leonardo's physiological profile for the first time.

From 1972 to 1977, Kline was on the editorial staff of National Geographic Magazine, writing articles ("Baltimore" Feb. 1975; "Library of Congress" Nov. 1975; "San Antonio" Apr. 1976) and book chapters ("Alaska, High Roads to Adventure" 1976, appearing on the jacket cover climbing Matanuska Glacier). His adventures in the Arctic included: 1976 explorations in Baffin Island—in the footsteps of pioneer anthropologist Franz Boas in the Cumberland Sound area, exploring Auyuittuq National Park—the northernmost national park in North America, and a rare crossing of Pangnirtung Pass from Broughton Island at Davis Strait to the Hamlet of Pangnirtung. He reported on other American cities for National Geographic, notably the music and cultural scene in Nashville, TN.

Kline's public sculpture, "Temple of the Hills", in Santa Fe, New Mexico, was chosen for national recognition in Art in America (Annual Issue, August 1995) and the Smithsonian Outdoor Sculpture Survey (http://collections.si.edu/search/tag/tagDoc.htm?recordID=siris_ari_337129&hlterm=temple%2Bof%2Bthe%2Bhills & http://collections.si.edu/search/tag/tagDoc.htm?recordID=siris_ari_337129&hlterm=temple%2Bof%2Bthe%2Bhills).

Kline's gallery archives covering his 40 years as an art dealer and his many discoveries of "lost art" were to be acquired by The Getty Research Institute in Malibu, CA.

Kline's personal collection of master paintings and drawings, and his large art research library, has been donated to The Riverbank Foundation, a 501 (c)(3) corporation based in Kansas City, MO. Riverbank's expanded vision, along with their sponsorship of the George Caleb Bingham Catalogue Raisonne, of which Kline served as editor, now fosters, with the addition of the Kline Art Research Collection, the development of connoisseurship in the art historical mission of American colleges, universities, and museums.

== Personal life and death ==
From 2000, Kline and his wife Jann lived at 7th Heaven Ranch near Santa Fe, a 20-acre forested nature preserve at an altitude of 7,000 feet, where they established the Kline Art Research Library, open to students and scholars. Jann (Arbogust Sasser) Kline, art historian and artist, and Kline's wife of 30 years, died in 2011. Their combined family included five children.

Kline lived in Las Vegas, New Mexico, from 2017, where he worked as a private art dealer and writer. His dogs, Woogie and Lulu, both companions for 15 years, died in 2021. Kline died on September 11, 2021, in Santa Fe, two years after a diagnosis of a rare form of blood cancer. He was 81.
