= Virginia Dwan =

American art dealer (1931–2022)

Virginia Dwan (October 18, 1931 – September 5, 2022) was an American art collector, art patron, philanthropist, and founder of the Dwan Light Sanctuary in Montezuma, New Mexico. She was the owner and executive director of Dwan Gallery, Los Angeles (1959–1967) and Dwan Gallery New York (1965–1971), a contemporary art gallery closely identified with the American movements of minimalism, conceptualism, and land art.

== Early life and education ==
Virginia Dwan, heiress to the Minnesota-based conglomerate 3M, was born in Minneapolis. She attended the University of California at Los Angeles to study art, but then dropped out and married a medical student in Los Angeles.

In 1950, Dwan married psychology graduate student Paul Fischer, and gave birth to her daughter, Candace. She married UCLA medical student Vadim Philippe Kondratief in 1958.

== Career ==
Dwan leased a tiny storefront in a Spanish Mission-style building at 1091 Broxton Avenue in the Westwood section of Los Angeles in 1959. In its early years, Dwan Gallery showed some local artists, most notably Ed Kienholz, but, more significantly, it brought New York and European artists to Los Angeles, introducing them to the city and its artists. The artists she presented there included Robert Rauschenberg, Yves Klein, Ad Reinhardt, Joan Mitchell, Franz Kline, Matsumi Kanemitsu and Philip Guston. In contrast to Ferus Gallery, Dwan was well funded.

Dwan found a bigger space in 1962, hiring art dealer John Weber, who brought in a few of his own artists and organized some shows. In June 1962, Dwan moved to the new location at 10846 Lindbrook Drive, which was twice as large as her first space. The building's renovation, which was designed by Morris Verger, a student of architect Frank Lloyd Wright, was inspired by the V.C. Morris store in San Francisco designed by the latter. Dwan organized several influential exhibitions in her new space, including "My Country 'Tis of Thee", an exhibition of Pop Art held in November 1962. This show belongs to a substantial group of exhibitions in Los Angeles between 1962 and 1963 that heralded the arrival of Pop as a major artistic style in the early 1960s. Though "My Country 'Tis of Thee" focused on New York artists, it also included the work of Edward Kienholz. Another important exhibition included "Boxes" (1964), which featured box-shaped works by an international group of artists including Los Angeles sculptors Larry Bell, Tony Berlant, Edward Kienholz, Ron Miyashiro, and Ken Price.

In 1965, Dwan moved to Manhattan. She opened a place on 57th Street, leaving Weber to run the gallery in Los Angeles for a few years before he joined her in New York. That gallery would exhibit minimalist and conceptual artists including Carl Andre, Michael Heizer, Kienholz, Sol LeWitt, Charles Ross and Robert Smithson. By 1969 she closed her Westwood space, which reopened as Doug Christmas' ACE Gallery. Robert Smithson's Spiral Jetty was financed in part by a US$9,000 grant from the Virginia Dwan Gallery in 1970. A 20-year lease for the site was granted for $100 annually.

Dwan then began to focus on earthworks such as the 35-Pole Lightning Field by Walter De Maria (the precursor to his Lightning Field) and Ross's Star Axis, a naked eye observatory in New Mexico whose construction she supported from its conception in 1971. She also purchased the land for Michael Heizer's Double Negative.

== Legacy ==
Fred R. Kline at Dwan Light Sanctuary, June 2018

In 1965, the Virginia Dwan Collection, featuring artists like Willem de Kooning (Untitled, 1961), Franz Kline, Robert Rauschenberg, Claes Oldenburg, and Lee Bontecou, was exhibited at the University of California, Los Angeles.

Dwan later gave many artworks to various museums in the United States. Already in 1969, she presented the Pasadena Art Museum (present day Norton Simon Museum) with L.H.O.O.Q. or La Joconde (1964) by Marcel Duchamp. In 1985, Dwan donated Michael Heizer's project Double Negative (1969), two 100-foot-long cuts facing each other across the curving rim of Mormon Mesa (Clark County, Nevada), to the Museum of Contemporary Art, Los Angeles (MOCA). In 1996, she gave Heizer's Actual Size: Munich Rotary (1970), six projected photographic images, each 52 feet (16 m) wide and 18 feet (5.5 m) high, to the Whitney Museum of American Art. Dwan conceived and supported construction of the Dwan Light Sanctuary (1996), a structural artwork and secular space on the campus of UWC-USA in Montezuma, New Mexico, built in collaboration with architect Laban Wingert and Charles Ross, who contributed the space's solar spectrum artwork.

Other works were given to other museums, including: the Museum of Modern Art, New York; the Art Institute of Chicago; the Walker Art Center in Minneapolis; the Herbert F. Johnson Museum of Art at Cornell University; the Weatherspoon Art Museum at the University of North Carolina at Greensboro; and the Des Moines Art Center. In 2013, Dwan gave A Nonsite, Pine Barrens, New Jersey (1968) by Robert Smithson, an indoor work containing substances from an outdoor site elsewhere; and Glass Stratum (1967) by Timothy McCormack, made up of 37 sheets of half-inch-thick glass layered atop one another, to the National Gallery of Art in Washington, D.C.

Collection pledged to National Gallery

Dwan's private collection was pledged as a promised gift to the National Gallery of Art in 2013. The 250 artworks include paintings, sculptures, drawings, and photographs from the late 1950s through the 1970s. It includes works by 52 modern artists, including: Carl Andre, Arman, Walter de Maria, Dan Flavin, Michael Heizer, Yves Klein, Sol LeWitt, Agnes Martin, Robert Rauschenberg, Martial Raysse, Ad Reinhardt, Larry Rivers, Fred Sandback, Robert Smithson, Niki de Saint Phalle, Jean Tinguely. The works have gone on display for the exhibition, “From Los Angeles to New York: The Dwan Gallery 1959-1971”, National Gallery (2016−2017), and traveled to the Los Angeles County Museum of Art (LACMA) (2017).

Archives

The Dwan Gallery Archives are held at the Archives of American Art, Smithsonian Institution, Washington D.C. and at the Center for Curatorial Studies at Bard College, Annandale-on-Hudson, New York.
