= Hannes Sigurðsson (art historian) =

Icelandic art historian and curator

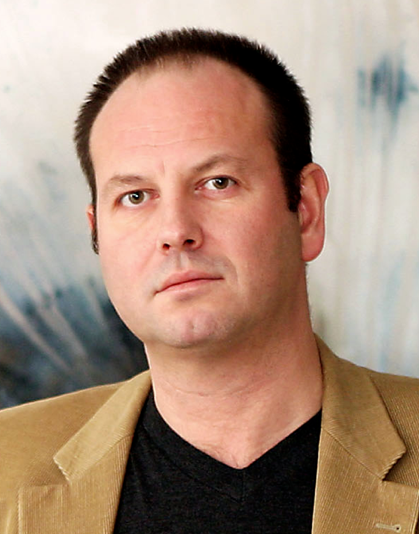

Hannes Sigurðsson (born 1960 in Reykjavík) is an art historian and an independent curator from Iceland.

Hannes was appointed the director of the Akureyri Art Museum in 1999, where he served for almost 15 years, and is the founder and director of the Icelandic Cultural Enterprise ART.IS. Hannes received an MA degree in art history from the University of California, Berkeley (1988-1990), and a BA degree from University College London (1985-1988) after graduating from the Department of Painting at the Icelandic College of Arts and Crafts (1980-1984) and the Reykjavik College of Music as a flautist (1975-1984).

Hannes worked in New York for five years as an art correspondent, where he began a career as an independent curator, the first one of his kind in Iceland.

Hannes has edited and published dozens of books and catalogues and curated over 350 exhibitions and large-scale projects.

Hannes is the founder of the Icelandic Visual Arts Awards that were first held in 2006.

== Publications ==
- Hvítir Skuggar: Margrét Jónsdóttir. Listasafnið á Akureyri, 2009. ISBN 978-9979-9829-6-8
- Hláturgas: Læknaskop frá vöggu til grafar. Reykjavík: art.is Books, 2001. ISBN 9979-9422-1-5
- Flögð og fögur skinn. Reykjavík: art.is Books, 1998. ISBN 9979-9337-0-4
