= ArtNexus =

Latin American art magazine

- ArtNexus cover, N° 79, Volume 9, 2010, featuring the work of Betsabeé Romero
- Editor: Celia S de Birbragher
- Categories: Visual arts
- Frequency: Quarterly
- Publisher: ArtNexus
- Total circulation: 15,000
- Founded: 1976 (50 years ago) as Arte en Colombia
- Country: Colombia and United States
- Based in: Bogotá and North Miami
- Language: Spanish and English
- Website: www.artnexus.com
- ISSN: 0121-5639
- OCLC: 32047179

ArtNexus is a magazine that covers the contemporary art of Latin America. From its documentation center in Bogotá, the magazine covers visual art and architecture. By publishing in both Spanish and English, the magazine fulfilled its goal to be "The Nexus Between Latin America and the Rest of the World."

== Structure and mission ==
The current editor and publisher is Celia S de Birbragher. The quarterly magazine is funded by two non-profit organizations, Fundación ArtNexus in Colombia and ArtNexus Foundation in the United States. The magazine and foundation's United States location is in North Miami, Florida.

The foundations sponsor scholarship, research archives, and public symposia. In 2011, Funación ArtNexus earned a $127,500 grant from the Getty Foundation to host Intellectual Networks: Art and Politics in Latin America, in which scholars researched artistic and scholarly networks throughout Latin America during the mid-twentieth century. This resulted in a major exhibition of historical documents at the Museo de Arquitectura Leopoldo Rother at the National University of Colombia. ArtNexus hosts events at major Latin American art fairs, including the International Art Fair of Bogotá and Art Basel Miami.

ArtNexus also hosts awards for outstanding living Latin American artists. It also hosts art exhibitions at Espacio Art Nexus in the Las Nieves neighborhood of Bogotá.

== Background ==
The magazine was founded in 1976 in Bogotá. Initially it was named Arte en Colombia and focused on Colombian art; however, in 1991, it changed its name to ArtNexus and expanded its scope to include the entire contemporary Latin American art scene.
