= Time Landscape =

Living art display

Coordinates: 40.72707°N 73.999529°W

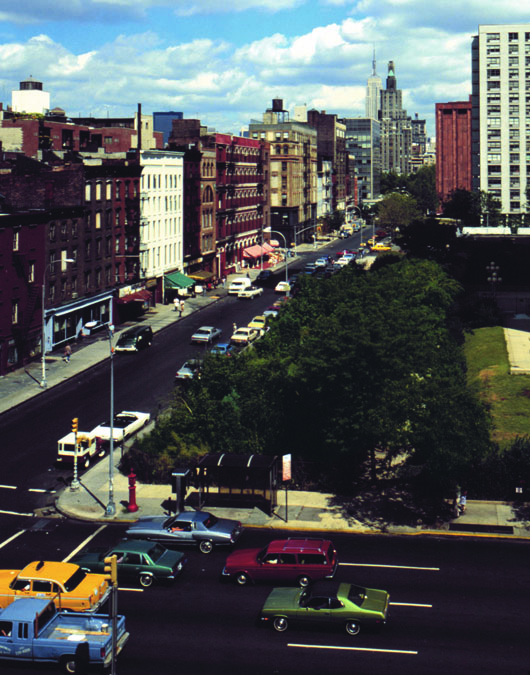
A photograph of Time Landscape

Time Landscape is a landscape artwork by American artist Alan Sonfist. Proposed in 1965, it consists of plants that were native to the New York City area in pre-colonial times. The plants were replanted in 1978, on a rectangular plot of 25' x 40' situated at University Village in lower Manhattan at the northeast corner of La Guardia Place and West Houston Street. The New York City Department of Parks and Recreation describes the artwork: "When it was first planted, Time Landscape portrayed the three stages of forest growth from grasses to saplings to grown trees. The southern part of the plot represented the youngest stage and now has birch trees and beaked hazelnut shrubs, with a layer of wildflowers beneath. The center features a small grove of beech trees (grown from saplings transplanted from Sonfist’s favorite childhood park in the Bronx) and a woodland with red cedar, black cherry, and witch hazel above groundcover of mugwort, Virginia creeper, aster, pokeweed, and milkweed. The northern area is a mature woodland dominated by oaks, with scattered white ash and American elm trees. Among the numerous other species in this miniforest are oak, sassafras, sweetgum, and tulip trees, arrowwood and dogwood shrubs, bindweed and catbrier vines, and violets." Sonfist's intention was to create a natural memorial akin to war memorials.

In 1969, Sonfist wrote and delivered a lecture at the Metropolitan Museum of Art titled "Natural Phenomena as Public Monuments". In the lecture, Sonfist elaborates on his lifelong commitment to creating ancient landscapes such as Time Landscape. "PUBLIC MONUMENTS traditionally have celebrated events in human history—acts of heroism important to the human community. Increasingly, as we come to understand our dependence on nature, the concept of community expands to include non-human elements. Civic monuments, then, should honor and celebrate the life and acts of the total community, the human ecosystem, including natural phenomena. Especially within the city, public monuments should recapture and revitalize the history of the natural environment at that location. As in war monuments, that record of life and death of soldiers, the life and death of natural phenomena such as rivers, springs, and natural outcroppings needs to be remembered. Climate change has been an evolving crisis in our society, and my art exposes the gravity of the issues. Each of my artworks echoes an understanding of the fragility of our environment."

== Timeline ==
- 1965: Proposal of the project.
- 1978: The Time Landscape project is unveiled by Sonfist.
- 2005: A second part of "Human/Nature Art and the Environment" is published in honor of the artwork's 40th anniversary.

== Publications ==
- "Natural Phenomena as Public Monuments", essay by Alan Sonfist 1968
- Publication of his lecture series at the Metropolitan Museum of Art in 1969
- "Art in the Land: A Critical Anthology of Environmental Art", E.P. Dutton, 1983, Editor: Alan Sonfist
- "Nature: The End of Art, distributed by Thames and Hudson", published by Gil Ori, 2004 republished in Europe and Asia
- "Human/Nature Art and the Environment Part 2, Alan Sonfist 'Time Landscape (1965-1978-Present)'"

== See also ==
- Living sculpture
- Social sculpture
- Vacant Lot of Cabbages: Nature, food and indigenous forest as art in the CBD.
- Wheatfield — A Confrontation, another piece of land art in New York.
