= Eleanor Heartney =

American art critic (born 1954)

- Born: 1954 (age 71–72); United States
- Education: University of Chicago
- Occupations: Art critic, curator, art historian, editor
- Awards: Chevalier de l'Ordre des Arts et des Lettres (2008)

Eleanor Heartney (born 1954) is an American art critic, curator, art historian and editor based in New York City. She has written for several publications including Art in America, The New York Times, The Washington Post, ARTnews, and the New Art Examiner. She wrote about depictions of the apocalypse in her book Doomsday Dreams (2019).

Heartney won the Frank Jewett Mather Award from the College Art Association in 1992 and the French government's Chevalier de l'Ordre des Arts et des Lettres award in 2008.

== Publications ==
- Critical Condition: American Culture at the Crossroads (1997)
- Postmodernism (2001)
- Defending Complexity: Art, Politics and the New World Order (2004)
- Postmodern Heretics: The Catholic Imagination in Contemporary Art (2004)
- City Art: New York's Percent for Art Program (2005)
- The Reckoning: Women Artists of the New Millennium (2013)
- Art & Today (2013)
- Renée Radell: Web of Circumstance (2016)
- Doomsday Dreams (2019)
