= Dan Beachy-Quick =

American poet

Dan Beachy-Quick is an American poet, writer, and critic. He is the author of eight collections of poems, most recently, Variations on Dawn and Dusk (Omnidawn Publishing), longlisted for the 2019 National Book Award for Poetry. His other books include A Whaler’s Dictionary (Milkweed Editions), a collection of essays about Moby Dick. His honors include a Lannan Foundation Residency and a Guggenheim Fellowship.

His poems have appeared widely in literary journals, including The Boston Review, The New Republic, Fence, Poetry, Chicago Review, VOLT, The Colorado Review, Paris Review, and New American Writing, and in anthologies including Best American Poetry. His essays and reviews have appeared in The New York Times, The Southern Review, The Poker, Rain Taxi, The Denver Quarterly, Interim, and other venues. He serves as Poetry Advisor for the literary journal A Public Space.

Beachy-Quick was born in 1973 in Chicago, and grew up in Colorado and upstate New York. His parents divorced when he was three and he was raised by his mother in Colorado, and spent summers in Ithaca, New York, with his father and grandparents.

He attended Hamilton College, the University of Denver, and the Iowa Writers' Workshop. He has taught writing at the School of the Art Institute of Chicago, and currently he is an assistant professor of English at Colorado State University. He lives in Fort Collins, Colorado with his wife and daughters.

== Published works ==
=== Full-length poetry collections ===
- Library Of— (Textshop Editions, 2021)
- Variations on Dawn and Dusk (Omnidawn, 2019)
- gentleness (Tupelo Press, 2015)
- Circle's Apprentice (Tupelo Press, 2011)
- This Nest, Swift Passerine (Tupelo Press, 2009)
- Mulberry (Tupelo Press, 2006)
- Spell (Ahsahta Press, 2004)
- North True South Bright (Alice James Books, 2003)

=== Translated poetry collections ===
- Wind—Mountain—Oak: The Poems of Sappho (Tupelo Press, forthcoming June 2023)
- The Thinking Root: The Poetry of the Earliest Greek Philosophy (Milkweed Editions, 2023)
- Stone-Garland: Six Poets from the Greek Lyric Tradition (Milkweed Editions, 2020)

=== Books ===
- Of Silence and Song (Milkweed Editions, 2017)
- An Impenetrable Screen of Purest Sky (Coffee House Press, 2013)
- A Whaler’s Dictionary (Milkweed Editions, 2008)
- Wonderful Investigations: Essays, Meditations, Tales (Milkweed Editions, 2012)
- A Brighter Word Than Bright: Keats at Work (Muse Books, 2013)

=== Book-length collaborative projects ===
- Conversities (with Srikanth Reddy) (1913 Press, 2012)
- Work from Memory (with Matthew Goulish) (Ahsahta Press, 2012)

=== Chapbooks ===
- Overtakelessness. Spork Press. 2010.
- Canto (with Srikanth Reddy). The Offending Adam. 2010.
- Mobius Crowns (with Srikanth Reddy). P-Queue. 2008.
- Apology for the Book of Creatures. Ahsahta. 2008.
- Sleep/Echo/Song (Wintered Press, 2006)

== Sources ==
- Library of Congress Online Catalog
- Colorado State University > Faculty Bios
