= Akureyri Art Museum =

Coordinates: 65.6804°N 18.0919°W

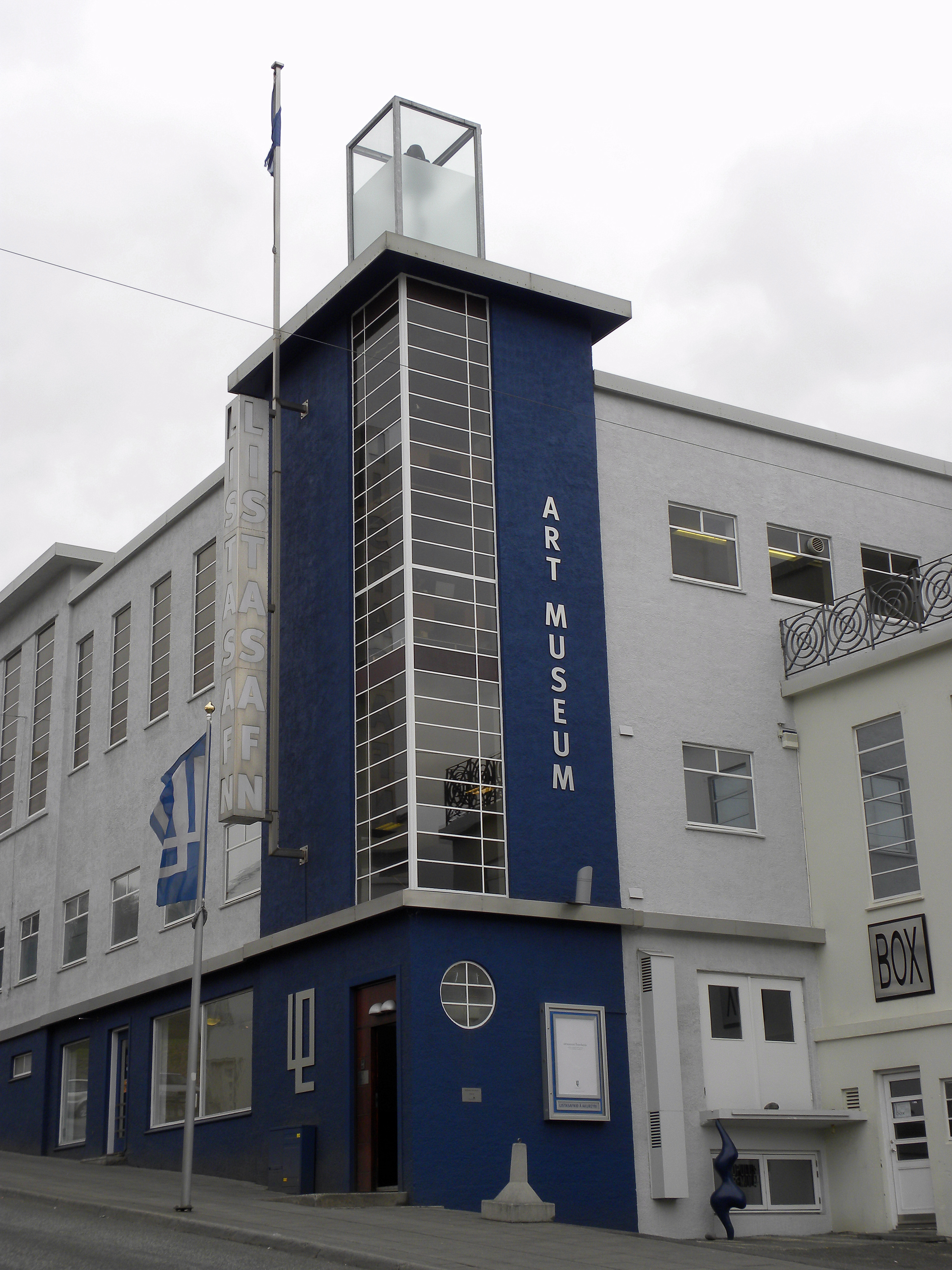
- Established: 1993
- Location: Listagil; 600 Akureyri, Iceland
- Type: Art museum
- Director: Hlynur Hallsson
- Website: www.listak.is

The Akureyri Art Museum (Icelandic: Listasafnið á Akureyri [ˈlɪstaˌsapnɪð au ˈaːkʏrˌeiːrɪ], regionally also [ˈaːkʰʏr-]) was founded in 1993. The museum is located in the center of Akureyri, the second-largest city in Iceland. Originally home to a dairy, the building which houses the gallery is noted as a good example of the Bauhaus school of architecture.

Artists that have had their work displayed in the Akureyri Art Museum include Icelandic artists Erró, Kjarval and Louisa Matthíasdóttir, American artist Spencer Tunick, Israeli video artist Guy Ben-Ner and French photographer Henri Cartier-Bresson.

The museum has been host to the Icelandic Visual Arts Awards since 2006, when they were first given.
