= Birdsong in music =

Role of birdsong in Western music

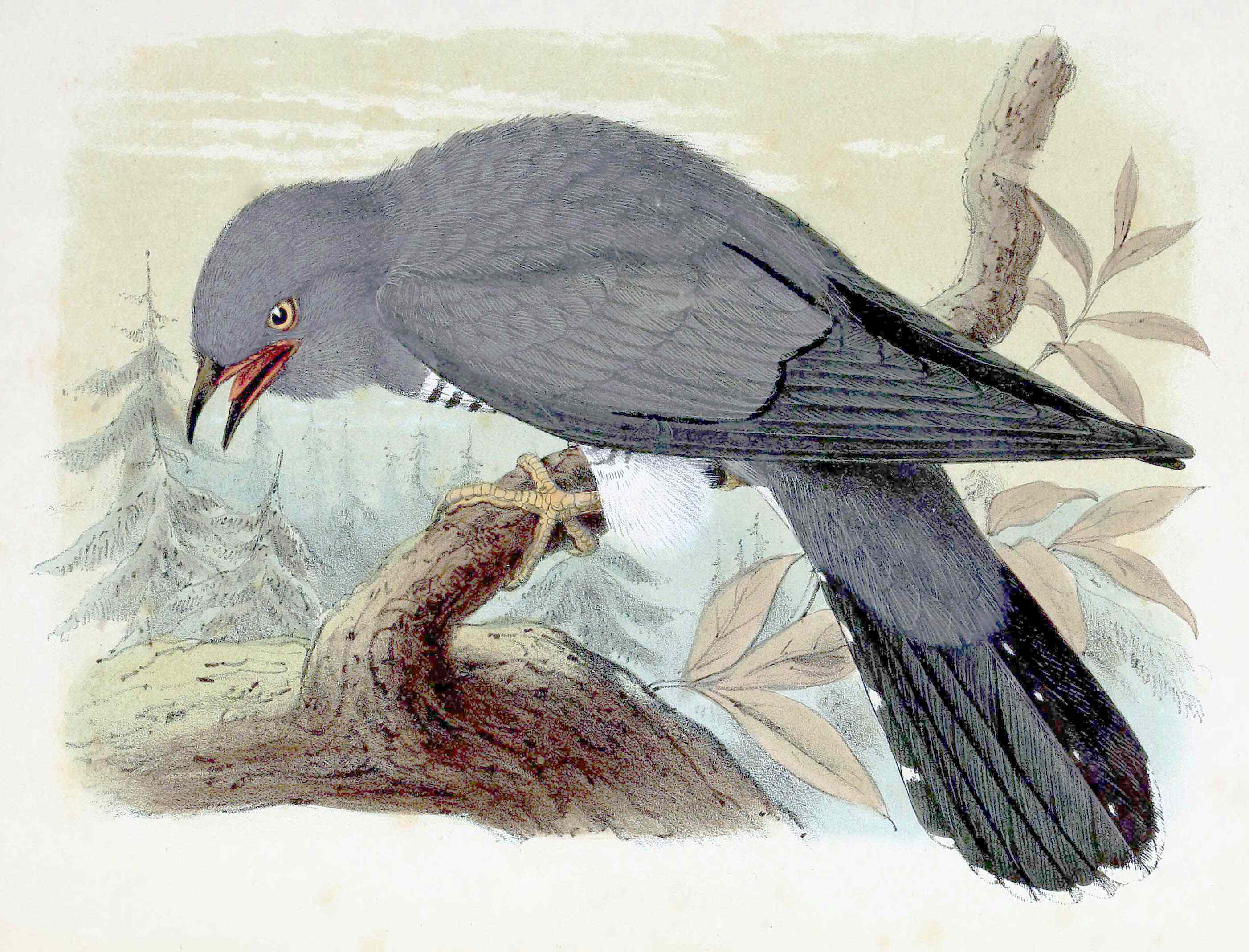
The cuckoo's well-known call is used in music by Beethoven, Delius, Handel, Respighi, Rimsky-Korsakov, Saint-Saëns, and Vivaldi. Engraving by John Gerrard Keulemans, 1873

Birds and birdsong have played a role in Western classical music since at least the 14th century, when composers such as Jean Vaillant quoted birdsong in some of their compositions. Among the birds whose song is most often used in music are the nightingale and the cuckoo.

Composers and musicians have made use of birdsong and the habits of birds in their music in different ways: they can be inspired by the sounds; they can intentionally imitate birdsong in a composition; they can incorporate recordings of birds into their works, as Ottorino Respighi first did; or, like the cellist Beatrice Harrison in 1924 and more recently the jazz musician David Rothenberg, they can duet with birds.

Authors including Rothenberg have claimed that birds such as the hermit thrush sing on traditional scales as used in human music, but at least one songbird, the nightingale wren, does not choose notes in this way. However, among birds which habitually borrow phrases or sounds from other species such as the starling, the way they use variations of rhythm, relationships of musical pitch, and combinations of notes can resemble music. The similar motor constraints on human and avian song may have driven these to have similar song structures, including "arch-shaped and descending melodic contours in musical phrases", long notes at the ends of phrases, and typically small differences in pitch between adjacent notes, at least in birds with a strong song structure like the Eurasian treecreeper.

== Influence on music ==
Musicologists such as Matthew Head and Suzannah Clark believe that birdsong has had a large though admittedly unquantifiable influence on the development of music. Birdsong has influenced composers in several ways: they can be inspired by birdsong; they can intentionally imitate bird song in a composition; they can incorporate recordings of birds into their works; or they can duet with birds.

=== Imitations of birdsong ===
==== In classical music ====
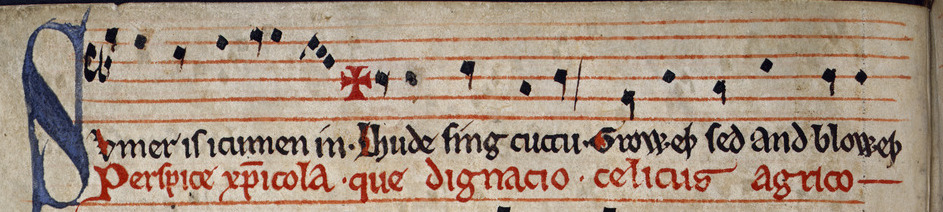
"Sumer is icumen in, Lhude sing cuccu", begins an English 13th century song for multiple voices.

Composers have a variety of bird sounds to work with, from actual birdsong and calls to the appearance and movements of birds, whether real, fictional (like the phoenix) or indeed mechanical. They can choose to use these materials literally, imitating their sounds, as when Sergei Prokofiev uses an oboe for the quacking of a duck in Peter and the Wolf; it may represent the birds symbolically; or it may give a general impression, as when Vivaldi paints a picture of birds moving and singing in The Four Seasons. Two especially popular birds are the nightingale and the cuckoo. The nightingale's song has been used by composers including Handel, who quoted it in the aria "Sweet bird" in L'Allegro, il Penseroso ed il Moderato, in the "Nightingale chorus" in Solomon, and in his Organ Concerto "No. 13", known as "The Cuckoo and the Nightingale". It appears in Rameau's opera Hippolyte, Respighi's The Birds and Beethoven's Third Symphony. Nightingales can also be found in works by Glinka, Mendelssohn, Liszt, Balakirev, Grieg, Granados, Ravel, and Milhaud. The cuckoo's distinctive call is used in the 13th-century English "Sumer is icumen in", probably the earliest instance of a birdcall in musical notation. In 1650, Athanasius Kircher represented the calls of several birds in musical notation in his encyclopedic Musurgia Universalis.

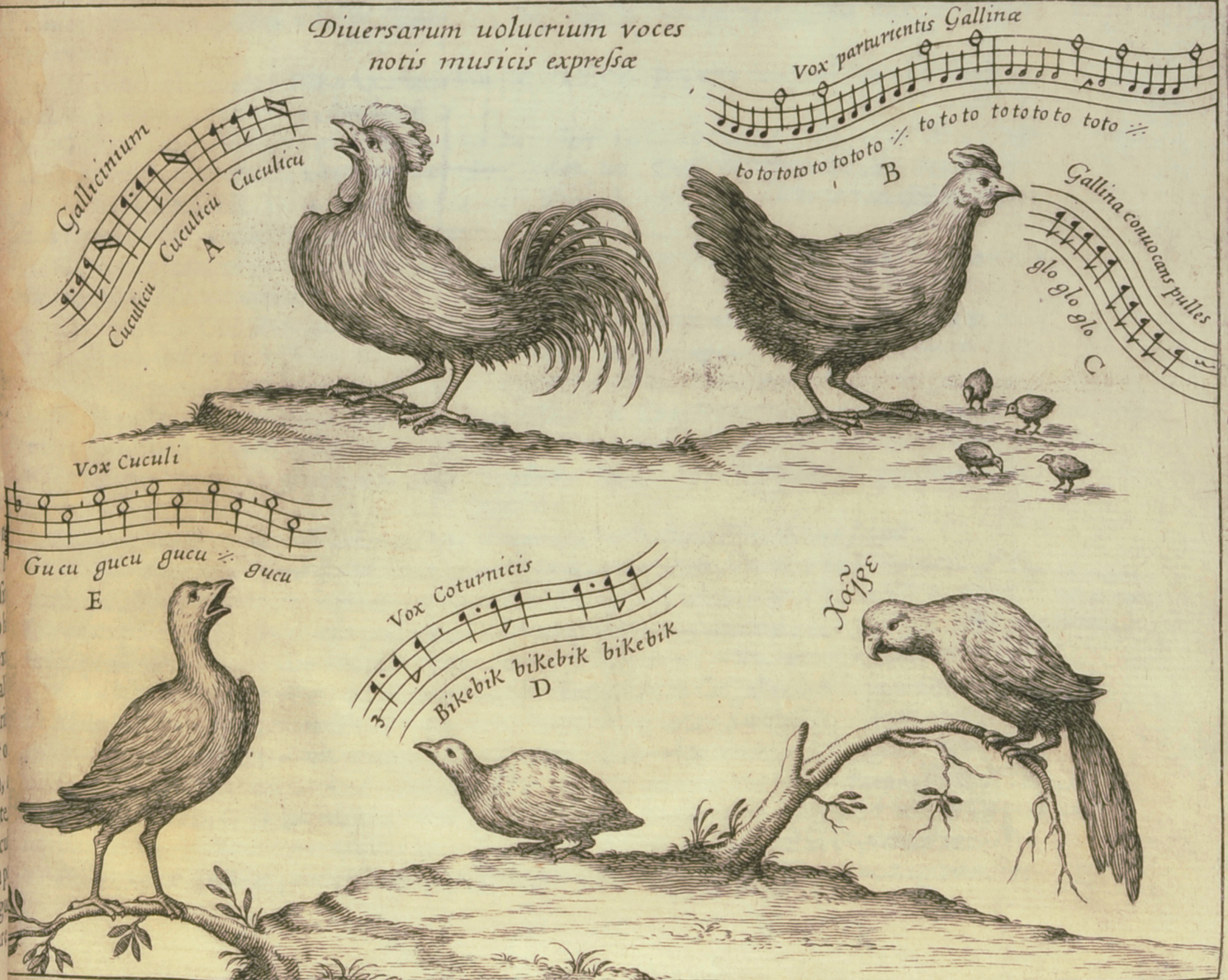
Songs of cockerel, chicken, cuckoo, and quail (and the speech of a parrot (Note: The parrot is saying χαίρε, chaire, 'cheers', a familiar greeting in Greek.)) in Athanasius Kircher's 1650 Musurgia Universalis

Heinrich Biber's c. 1669 Sonata Representiva is composed in sections labelled with the names of birds and other animals. It uses string scratching and detuned unisons to imitate the nightingale, cuckoo, cockerel and chicken. Several composers have written works that portray multiple birds. Clément Janequin's 16th century Le Chant des oiseaux has the singers mention birds by name, and then depicts the bird's songs with nonsense syllables. Jean-Philippe Rameau's 1724 Rappel des oiseaux indicates the presence of bird calls only in its title; while John Walsh's c. 1715 Bird Fancyer's Delight is a collection of short phrases labelled with bird names, which was intended to teach cage birds to sing.

Among the major composers to imitate birdsong are Beethoven (Pastoral Symphony, 2nd movement), Delius (On Hearing the First Cuckoo in Spring), Handel (The Cuckoo and the Nightingale), Respighi (The Birds), Rimsky-Korsakov (Snow Maidens), Dvořák, Saint-Saëns (Carnival of the Animals), Vivaldi (Concerto in A, The Cuckoo), and Gustav Mahler (First Symphony, where the cuckoo sings perfect fourths instead of the usual major third or minor third).

Less commonly imitated are the great tit (Anton Bruckner's Fourth Symphony), the goldfinch (Vivaldi), linnet (Couperin, Haydn and Rachmaninov), robin (Peter Warlock), swallow (Dvorak and Tchaikovsky), wagtail (Benjamin Britten), and magpie (in a Mussorgsky song, and in Gioachino Rossini's 1817 opera semiseria, La gazza ladra, "The Thieving Magpie"). Dvorak celebrated many other kinds of bird, including the stock dove, skylark, and house sparrow.

Prokofiev's duck theme in Peter and the Wolf

Among twentieth-century composers, Olivier Messiaen used birdsong extensively. His Catalogue d'oiseaux is a seven-book set of solo piano pieces based on birdsong. His orchestral piece Réveil des oiseaux is composed almost entirely of birdsong. Many of his other compositions, including Quatuor pour la fin du temps, similarly integrate birdsong. Messiaen noted that it was "especially difficult" to transcribe the timbres of birdsong for his Catalogue d'oiseaux, as birdsong includes a wide variety of harmonics; he found that he had to "resort to unusual combinations of notes", and that the piano "was the only instrument capable of speaking at the great speed and in the very high registers called for by some of the more virtuosic birds, such as the woodlark, the skylark, the garden warbler, the blackcap, the nightingale, the song thrush, the sedge warbler and the reed warbler". He added that only the piano could "imitate the raucous, grinding, percussive calls of the raven... the rattling of the corncrake, the screeches of the water rail, the barking of the herring gull, the dry, imperious sound, like tapping on a stone, of the black-eared wheatear, and the sunny charm of the rock thrush".

Béla Bartók likewise made extensive use of North American birdsong in his Piano Concerto No. 3. Carl Nielsen used representations of bird calls in Song of the Siskin, a rarely imitated bird, The First Lark, and Springtime on Fyn, though much of the effect of birds on his work appears in his orchestral colours and time-patterns. Jean Sibelius claimed that the crane's call was the "leitmotiv of my life": it is imitated by clarinets in "Scene with Cranes" in his incidental music from Kuolema. Sibelius's Swan of Tuonela has a sad melody on the cor anglais. The music critic Rebecca Franks, listing six of the best pieces inspired by birdsong, praises Ralph Vaughan Williams's 1914 The Lark Ascending, which begins with "A silvery solo violin line flutters and darts, reaching up ever higher above the orchestra's hushed, held chord. There's no other opening quite like it for instant atmosphere". Hanna Tuulikki's Away with the Birds (2013) is composed of traditional Gaelic songs and poems which imitate birdsong; its five movements represent waders, seabirds, wildfowl, corvids, and the cuckoo. Other composers who have made extensive use of birdsong in their music include Emily Doolittle and Hollis Taylor.

O Urubu e o Gavião
The choro "O Urubu e o Gavião" ("the vulture and the hawk") from Rio de Janeiro state quotes several birdsongs.

The zoomusicologist Hollis Taylor has charted the multiple techniques used by composers when appropriating the song of the Australian pied butcherbird (Cracticus nigrogularis):

In compositional design, pied butcherbird vocalisations have been the source in the parameters of melody, harmony, rhythm, gesture, contour, dynamic envelope, formal structure, phrase length (and the balance of sound and silence), scales, repetition, acoustic image, programmatic intent, and poetic or psychic inspiration. Their flute-like phrases have been assigned to piano and bass, clarinet and bassoon, xylophone and violin. They have been embedded in a stuffed toy.

Composer Alexander Liebermann transcribes birdsong onto sheet music and incorporates bird calls into his compositions. Species he has transcribed include the musician wren (uirapuru), the common loon, the thrush nightingale, the white bellbird, the Chinese hwamei, the Japanese bush warbler (uguisu), the common peafowl, the oropendola, the cuckoo, and the Javan pied starling, among others.

==== In other musical traditions ====
The imitation of bird song was popular in stage performances in the United States, particularly during the era when vaudeville and Chautauqua were popular. Gramophone recordings of whistling performances accompanied by instrumental music were also popular. Prominent performers in America included Charles Crawford Gorst, Charles Kellogg, Joe Belmont, and Edward Avis; those in Britain included Alec Shaw and Percy Edwards.

Among jazz musicians who have chosen to use sounds like birdsong are Paul Winter (Flyway) and Jeff Silverbush (Grandma Mickey). The improvisatory saxophonist Charlie Parker, known as "Bird", played fast, flowing melodic lines, with titles such as "Yardbird Suite", "Ornithology", "Bird Gets the Worm", and "Bird of Paradise".

The scholar of folklore Imani Sanga identifies three ways that bird song is classified and perceived in an African context: that birds sing, are musicians, and are materials for composition. He notes that Western musicians likewise use birds in compositions. Sanga mentions that a 1982 study by Feld explained that in Kaluli music, birds are perceived as spirits that want to communicate with the living through their singing. He describes stories he grew up with in Africa, emphasizing that people made stories about birds to justify their presence around them. His perception of birds influenced his life daily, creating memories in which the common birds, ringed-neck doves and African ground hornbills, were important.

The ethnographer Helena Simonett writes that the Yoreme of northwestern Mexico play animal sounds including birdcalls on a "simple cane flute" in ritual performances with singing, music, and dancing; their sacred reality thus enacted involves transforming into the animals in their enchanted world.

=== Use of recorded birdsong ===
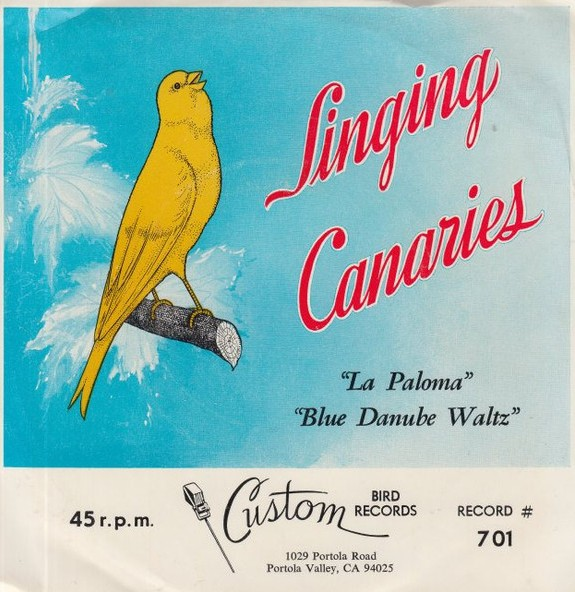
A 1953 single record of domestic canaries singing with classical tunes La Paloma and Blue Danube Waltz

The Italian composer Ottorino Respighi, with his Pines of Rome (1923–1924), may have been the first to compose a piece of music that calls for pre-recorded birdsong. A few years later, Respighi wrote Gli Uccelli ("The Birds"), based on Baroque pieces imitating four different birds, one to each movement of the work after its prelude:

- "Prelude" (based on the music of Bernardo Pasquini)
- "La colomba" ("The dove", based on the music of Jacques de Gallot)
- "La gallina" ("The hen", based on the music of Jean-Philippe Rameau)
- "L'usignuolo" ("The nightingale", based on the folksong "Engels Nachtegaeltje" transcribed by recorder virtuoso Jacob van Eyck)
- "Il cucù" ("The cuckoo", based on the music of Pasquini)

In 1972, the Finnish composer Einojuhani Rautavaara wrote the orchestral piece Cantus Arcticus (Opus 61, dubbed Concerto for Birds and Orchestra). It makes extensive use of recorded birdsong and bird calls from the Arctic, such as the trumpeting of migrating swans.

In the 1960s and 1970s, several popular music bands started to use sound effects including birdsong in their albums. For example, the English band Pink Floyd included bird sound effects in songs from their 1969 albums More and Ummagumma (for example, "Grantchester Meadows"). Similarly, the English singer Kate Bush used bird calls on her 2005 album, Aerial. The well-known 1968 song "Blackbird" by the Beatles includes an actual Eurasian blackbird singing in the background.

The group Sweet People reached the UK Top 5 in 1980 with their track "Et Les Oiseaux Chantaient (And the Birds Were Singing)", which fused birdsong with ambient music. Another track, consisting solely of a collage of different birdsong, was released as the charity single "Let Nature Sing" in 2019 by the Royal Society for the Protection of Birds and reached number 18 on the UK chart.

The French composer François-Bernard Mâche has been credited with the creation of zoomusicology, the study of the music of animals. His 1983 essay "Musique, mythe, nature, ou les Dauphins d'Arion" includes a study of "ornitho-musicology", in which he speaks of "animal musics" and a longing to connect with nature.

Other recent composers for whom recorded birdsong is a major influence include R. Murray Schafer, Michel Gonneville, Rozalie Hirs, and Stephen Preston. The Indian zoo-musicologist A. J. Mithra has composed music using natural bird, animal and frog sounds since 2008.

Jonathan Harvey's Bird Concerto with Piano Song, premiered in 2003, makes use of the slowed-down song of American west coast birds including the orchard oriole, the indigo bunting and the golden-crowned sparrow, so as to explore their complexity and ornamentation which are otherwise too rapid for the human ear to analyse.

Stephen Nachmanovitch's Hermitage of Thrushes (released 2020) consists of ten pieces featuring the songs of a wide variety of birds, some of them slowed-down, in counterpoint with violin, viola, electric violin, and viola d'amore. The composer recorded the songs and created the music during the early part of the coronavirus pandemic, all within a square mile of Virginia woodlands.

== Birdsong as music ==
=== Human-bird duet performances ===
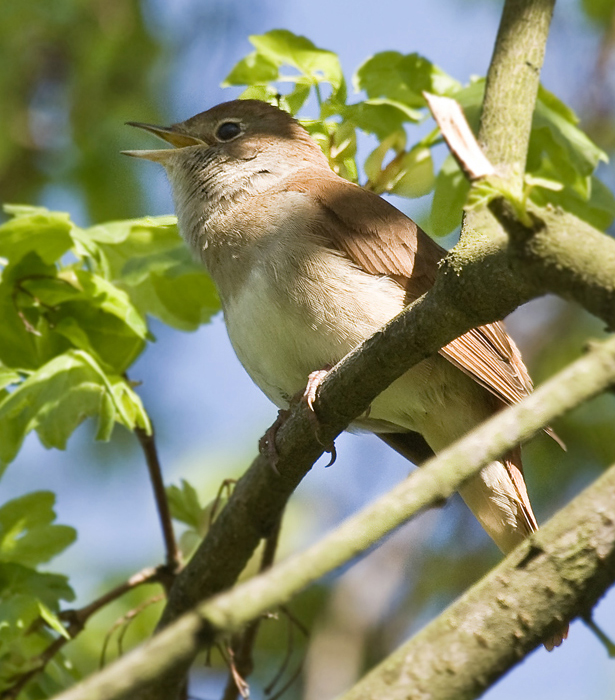
Nightingales are admired for their unusually rich song.

On 19 May 1924, Beatrice Harrison broadcast a BBC radio programme in which she played the cello in her garden in Oxted, Surrey, alongside singing nightingales, attracted by her cello music. (Note: In the 1924 sound clip, Harrison is heard playing "Danny Boy" on the cello while the nightingales sing.) This was the BBC's first ever outside broadcast. The duet was celebrated 90 years on by the violinist Janet Welsh in Lincolnshire. The philosopher and jazz musician David Rothenberg similarly played an impromptu duet in March 2000 with a laughingthrush at the National Aviary in Pittsburgh. In the wild, male and female laughingthrushes sing complex duets, so "jamming" with a human clarinet player exploits the bird's natural behaviour. The duet inspired Rothenberg's 2005 book Why Birds Sing. Rothenberg has also recorded a duet with an Australian lyrebird.

=== Musical qualities of birdsong ===
In Why Birds Sing, Rothenberg claims that birds vocalize traditional scales used in human music. He argues that birds like the hermit thrush sing on the pentatonic scale, while the wood thrush sings on the diatonic scale, as evidence that birdsong not only sounds like music, but is music in a human sense. Rothenberg's ideas were explored in a 2006 BBC documentary with the same title as the book. The claim that birds use fixed musical intervals, as on a scale, is however contradicted by a 2012 study led by the ecologist Marcelo Araya-Salas. It showed that of 243 samples of the nightingale wren's song, only 6 matched the intervals used in scales. (Note: The Araya-Salas study did not investigate the song of species other than the nightingale wren, nor other aspects of musicality such as those explored by Adam Tierney.)

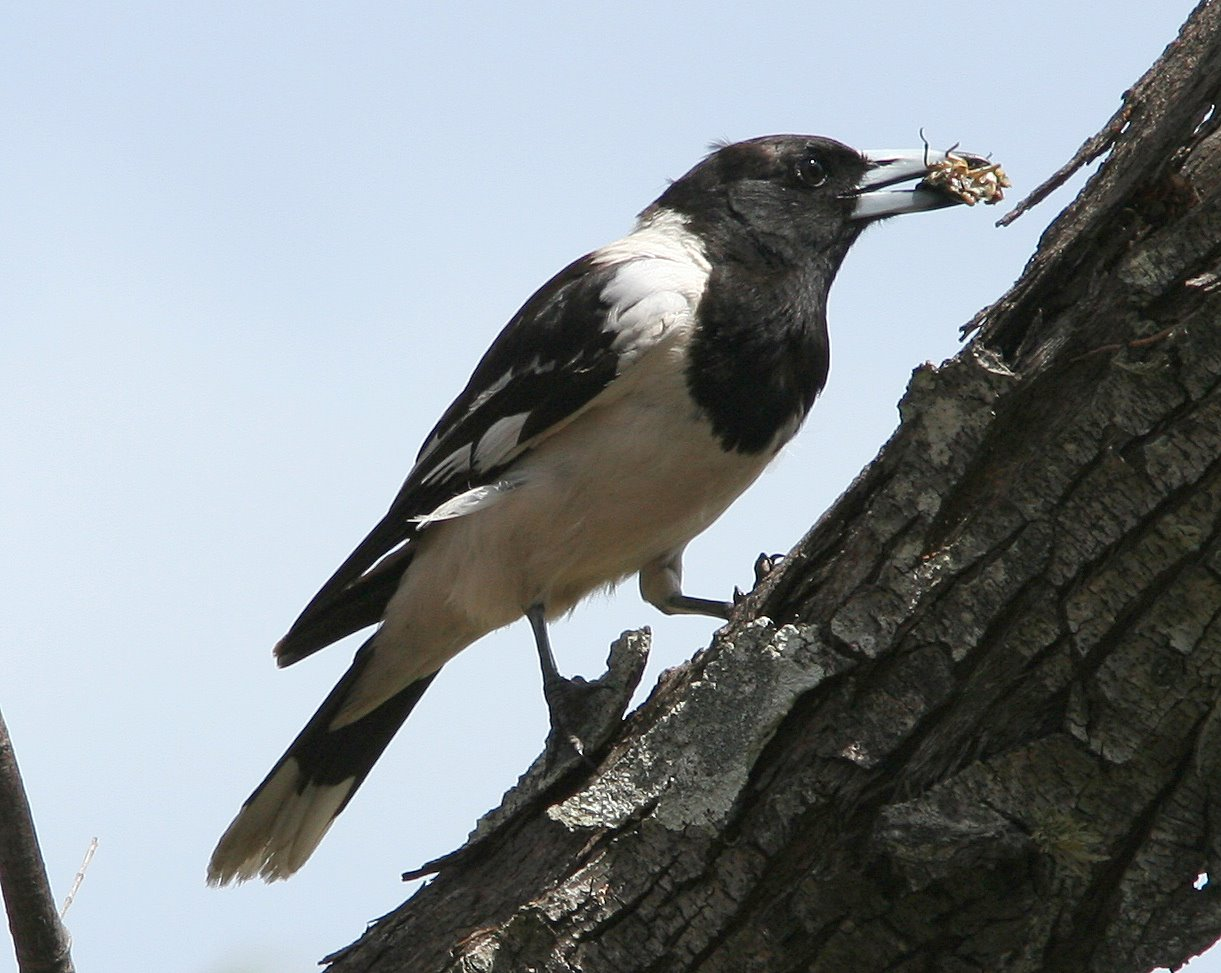
The pied butcherbird has an elaborate song with musical qualities.

Luis Felipe Baptista and Robin A. Keister argued in a 2005 paper "Why Birdsong is Sometimes Like Music" that the way birds use variations of rhythm, relationships of musical pitch, and combinations of notes can resemble music. They consider the theory that birds sometimes exploit variation in song to avoid monotony. They survey bird families that habitually borrow phrases or sounds from other species; the European starling is a well-studied borrower, and it inspired a composition by W. A. Mozart; see Mozart's starling.

Adam Tierney and colleagues argued in a 2011 paper that the similar motor constraints on human and avian song drive these to have similar song structures, including "arch-shaped and descending melodic contours in musical phrases", long notes at the ends of phrases, and typically small differences in pitch between adjacent notes. They excluded birds like the European starling which use many buzzing or clicking noises that are inharmonic, working instead with birds with a strong pitch structure like the field sparrow Spizella pusilla (Emberizidae), the Eurasian treecreeper Certhia familiaris (Certhiidae) and the summer tanager, Piranga rubra (Thraupidae).

Hollis Taylor argued in her 2017 book that the vocalizations of the pied butcherbird are music, rebutting musicological objections to this in detail. This was accompanied by birdsong-based "(re)compositions" based on avian transcriptions, paired with field recordings from the Australian outback.

== In ethnomusicology ==
Michael Silvers writes that multispecies ethnomusicology, especially of birds, can improve understanding of how music is produced and its purpose, and clarify what ethnomusicology is. He found some 150 ethnomusicology articles on birds. He noted that Bruno Nettl, discussing Persian classical music, stated that listening to the Nightingale was a metaphor; it never repeats its song, so listening to it signifies that that human music may not repeat either. Laudan Nooshin uses Nettl's account of the nightingale to describe khalāqiat, musical improvisation, which however requires knowledge of radif, the traditional repertory. The Nightingale is important culturally for its song, so musicologists must study its song to understand its improvisation, just as they must study human music to understand human musical improvisation.

== See also ==
- Insects in music
