= Impressionist (entertainment) =

Performer whose act consists of imitating celebrities

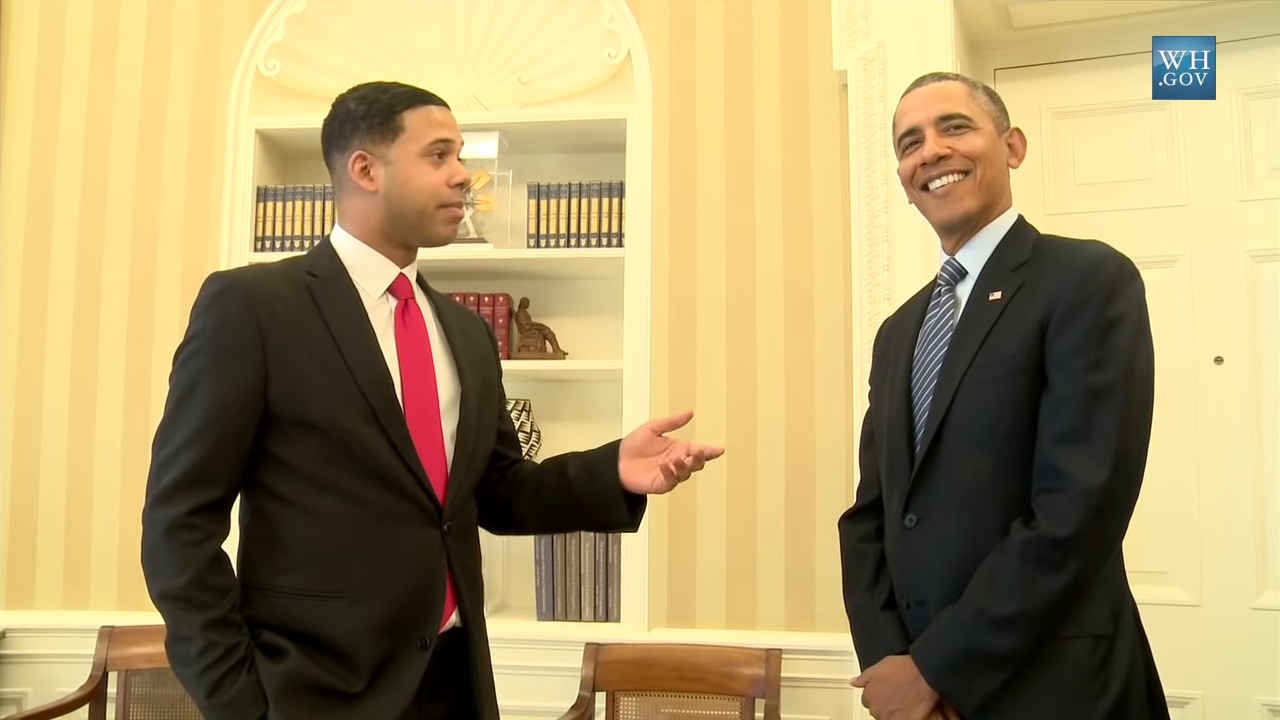
Impressionist Iman Crosson (left) imitating Barack Obama (right) in 2014

An impressionist or a mimic is a performer whose act consists of imitating sounds, voices and mannerisms of celebrities and cartoon characters. The word usually refers to a professional comedian/entertainer who specializes in such performances and has developed a wide repertoire of impressions, including adding to them, often to keep pace with current events. Impressionist performances are a classic casino entertainment genre.

Someone who imitates one particular person without claiming a wide range, such as a lookalike, is instead called an impersonator. In very broad contexts, "impersonator" may be substituted for "impressionist" where the distinction between the two is less important than avoiding confusion with the use of "impressionist" in painting and music.

Usually the most "impressive" aspect of the performance is the vocal fidelity to the target – usually a politician or a famous person. Props may also be employed, such as glasses or hats, but these are now considered somewhat old-fashioned and cumbersome: the voice is expected to carry the act.

Because animated cartoons often lampoon famous people (sometimes obliquely), a facility for impressions is one of the marks of a successful voice actor. Many cartoon characters are intended to be recognized by the audience as evoking a specific celebrity, even when not explicitly named. With such indirect references, the entertainment value does not lie so much in the technical achievement of exactly reproducing the voice so much as in merely making it recognizable; the joke lies in the reference to a celebrity, not in its rendition.

== In Britain ==
During the 1970s, British television was awash with impressions of Frank Spencer, a character from the hugely popular British sitcom Some Mothers Do 'Ave 'Em. This may have been because Frank had such distinctive mannerisms and dress sense which gave performers a number of visual shortcuts to cover for failings in their abilities. For about a decade, no British impressionist's act was complete without Frank.

From the mid-1960s to the early 1980s, Mike Yarwood dominated the impressionist scene, with his own TV shows regularly attracting more than 10 million viewers. Impressionists were very popular on the televised talent shows of the 1970s; Lenny Henry is a notable example of an act that developed from this.

In the 1990s, there was a certain absence of impressionists on television, with the demise of Spitting Image and Rory Bremner mainly concentrating on political figures (notably John Major, Tony Blair, Gordon Brown, and also members of the Royal Family). Then, in 1999, came Alistair McGowan's Big Impression, with Alistair McGowan and Ronni Ancona, and in 2002 Dead Ringers. Both of these shows featured impressions of celebrities and television personalities, as well as sporting figures on the former and politicians on the latter. In the same year as Dead Ringers' debut, Channel 4 began broadcasting the adult sketch show Bo' Selecta!, created by and starring comedian Leigh Francis, which spoofed singers, including Craig David, Mel B and Michael Jackson; however, the show focused on making caricatures out of celebrities rather than impersonating them.

The Icons in London, which ran at The Venue in Leicester Square from 4 January to 28 February 2007 and starred the notable impressionist Greg London, is the first original musical to have dealt with impressions in depth. The book was by Greg London, West End theatre director David Taylor and London playwright Paul Miller. In 2009, a new BBC One impressions show, The Impressions Show with Culshaw and Stephenson, was a big hit, starring Jon Culshaw and Debra Stephenson donning Britain's most famous faces. A third series of the programme premiered in October 2011.

== In North America ==
From the late 1960s, Rich Little has been the pre-eminent impressionist, mimicking a wide range of celebrities and politicians. The cast of NBC's Saturday Night Live have performed impressions of politicians and celebrities since the program debuted in 1975. Jimmy Fallon, a Saturday Night Live alumnus and current host of NBC's The Tonight Show, rose to fame with stand-up comedy routines featuring impressions of many celebrities in various scenarios. Fellow Saturday Night Live alumni Darrell Hammond, Bill Hader, and Jay Pharoah have been cited as 'master impressionists', each having performed impressions of over 80 different celebrities on the show. American impressionist Frank Caliendo is also widely known for his impressions of celebrities and personalities such as John Madden and George W. Bush, which he performed while starring in television series MADtv, Fox NFL Sunday and his own show Frank TV.

Many of today's Presidential impressionists have been influenced by Vaughn Meader, whose 1962 impersonations of John F. Kennedy on the album The First Family made him famous.

Impressionists are a major part of animation; many film and television cartoons (especially adaptations of franchises) use impressions of famous celebrities of any era. Voice actors who are or were known for their celebrity impressions include Daws Butler, Mel Blanc, Don Messick, Maurice LaMarche, Tress MacNeille, James Arnold Taylor and Rob Paulsen.

Some impressionists have more specialized acts in the art. For example, Canadian comedian André-Philippe Gagnon, Canadian singer Véronic Dicaire, and American Greg London impersonate singing voices. Canadian Tracey Bell impersonates celebrities. Legends In Concert produces musical impressionist shows known as tribute artist productions.

== In India ==
Nerella Venumadhav imitates world politicians, film artists, singers, poets, scenes from Shakespeare's plays, popular movies including musical notes. Other notable actors include Jayaram, Sivakarthikeyan, and Dileep.

== In Hong Kong, China and Taiwan ==
The entertainment industries in Hong Kong, China and Taiwan are famous for impersonations by singers. Some well-established singers such as Adam Cheng are considered first-generation impersonators. Notable singers/impersonators/comedians include Johnson Lee, Wong Cho Lam, Show Lo, Eason Chan, and JJ Lin and many more.

== Bird impressionists ==
In the late nineteenth and early twentieth century, prior to the advent of high quality recording, animal and bird impressionists were popular on stage as entertainers. Some prominent performers included Charles Crawford Gorst (USA), Charles Kellogg, Joe Belmont, Edward Avis, Alec Shaw and Percy Edwards (UK).

== See also ==
- Look-alike
- Impersonator
- Celebrity impersonator
