= Paradise Guerrilla =

Brazilian pop music band

- Origin: Rio de Janeiro, Brazil
- Genres: Pop Music; Dance Pop; Synth Pop
- Years active: 2022–present
- Labels: Symphonic; Paradise Guerrilla Publishing & Records
- Members: Starlight; U.F.O; Frankstation

Paradise Guerrilla is a Brazilian pop music band formed in Rio de Janeiro in 2022. The current lineup consists of Starlight, U.F.O., and Frankstation.

Marked by the use of alien-referenced costumes by two members and the pop presence of its frontwoman, the band draws strong influences from sci-fi, the gaming universe, and comic book culture in its videos and performances. Its pop sound blends electronic elements with the use of analog instruments such as Moog synthesizers and drum machines, bass and guitar. Its compositions deal with themes such as extraterrestrial life and human relationships.

Their debut single "Another Galaxy" was among the 50 most played songs on Brazilian radio in 2022, and its music video was nominated in two categories at the 2022 Music Video Festival Awards.

In 2023 the band announces their first album, "I Wanna Make A Hole In The Sky", accompanied by a trilogy of music videos that were recorded within the band's new game, coinciding with their performance in the first edition of The Town Festival.

== Members ==
- Starlight - lead vocal, musical production
- U.F.O. - electric guitar, synthesizer, musical production
- Frankstation - electric bass, synthesizer, musical production

== Discography ==
=== Albums ===
- I Wanna Make A Hole In The Sky(2023)

=== Singles ===
- Another Galaxy(2022)
- Escape feat. Tsukiyomi(2022)
- Through The Lights(2022)
- Intoxicated(2023)
- Storm(2023)
- Supernatural Freak(2023)

== Awards and nominations ==
Music Video Festival Awards

2022

- Nominated in the categories: "Best narrative in music video - Jury's choice" and "Special effects in music video - Jury's choice"
