= Let Nature Sing =

Single by Royal Society for the Protection of Birds
- Released: 26 April 2019
- Recorded: 2016–2019
- Genre: Birdsong
- Length: 2:32
- Label: Horus Music
- Songwriters: Sam Lee, Bill Barclay and Adrian Thomas
- Producer: Andrew Mellor

"Let Nature Sing" is a single released by the Royal Society for the Protection of Birds on 26 April 2019, consisting of 2 minutes 32 seconds of British birdsong. The track was mixed by Adrian Thomas, Sam Lee and Bill Barclay, and released by the RSPB through Horus Music. The single was created to raise awareness of threats to birds and its release was timed to coincide with International Dawn Chorus Day on 5 May 2019. It reached number 18 on the UK Singles Chart, marking the first time a recording solely of birds had entered the charts, and reached number 1 on the UK Singles Sales Chart.

== Production ==
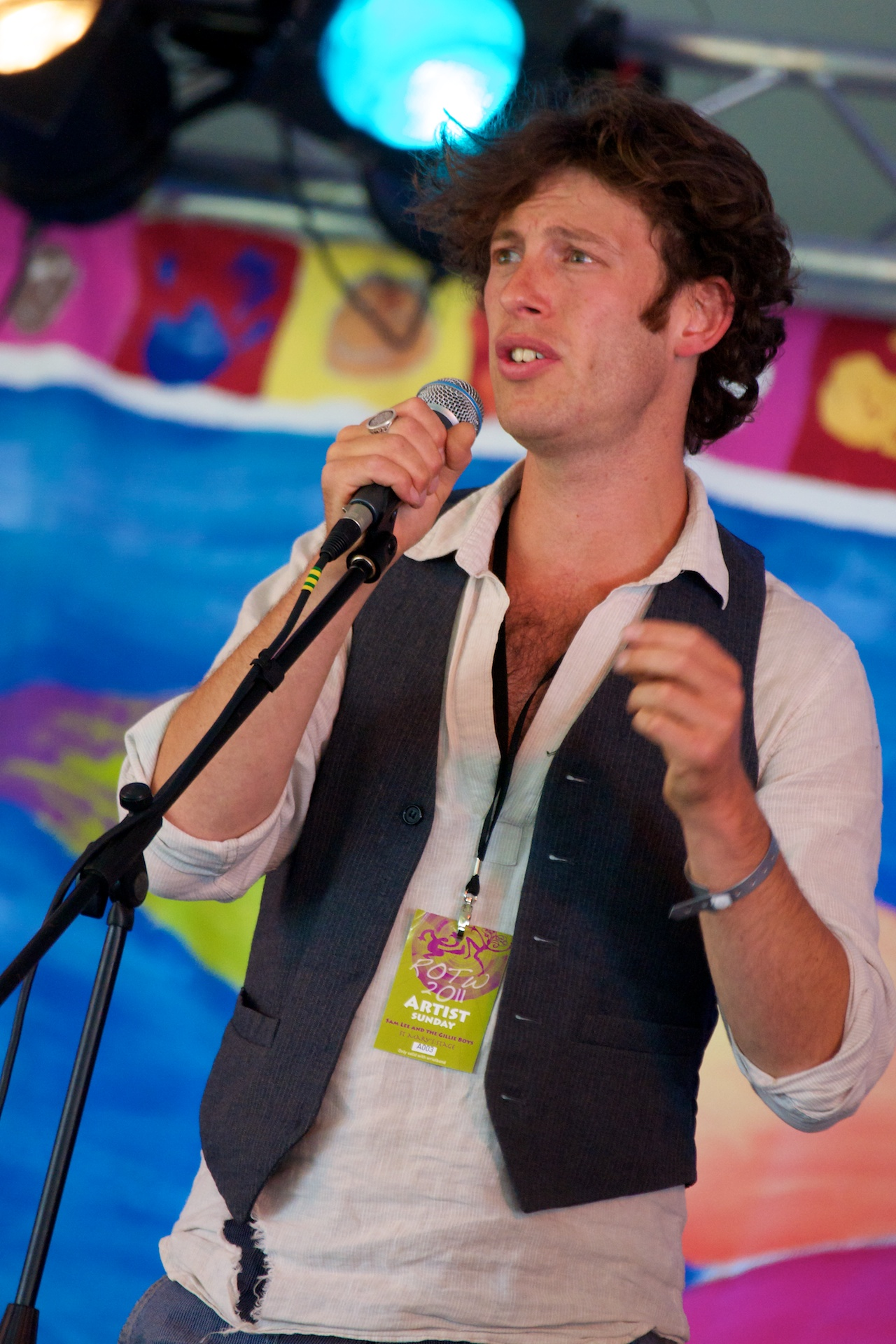
Sam Lee, an artist active in the Extinction Rebellion movement, was one of the creators of the track.

To raise awareness of the decline in bird populations over the last 50 years, the RSPB recruited the creative agency Glimpse to create a campaign to bring nature into popular culture. Part of the campaign was for a single to be released and enter the charts for International Dawn Chorus Day on 5 May 2019.

While producing the RSPB Guide to Birdsong, the author Adrian Thomas recorded samples of many different British bird songs between 2016 and 2019. Thomas then mixed some of these recordings together into a demo. Thomas then recruited the help of Bill Barclay, the musical director at the Globe Theatre, and the folk musician Sam Lee to arrange the recordings into a track. The final mix was produced by Andrew Mellor, recording engineer of the Philadelphia Orchestra.

To coincide with the release of the track, the RSPB organised a panel on "the musicality of nature" hosted by BBC Radio 6 presenter Shaun Keaveny, with Eliza Doolittle, Chrissie Rhodes of The Shires, and Sam Lee. The track was remixed by Diplo for the Nick Grimshaw drivetime show, creating a "donk" version.

=== Featured birds ===
The song features the songs of many different species, ranging from very common garden birds such as the blackbird and robin to endangered and rare species such as cranes, of which only a few pairs are found in the UK. These include:

- Cuckoo
- Nightingale
- Wren
- Blackbird
- Great spotted woodpecker
- Robin
- Collared dove
- Crane
- Curlew
- Lapwing
- Swift
- Bittern
- Turtle dove
- Chiffchaff
- Snipe
- Blackcap
- Swallow
- Great tit
- Sedge warbler
- Grasshopper warbler
- Skylark
- Song thrush
- Nightjar
- Tawny owl

== Music video ==
The video, performed by Drew Colby, uses shadowgraphy or "hand shadow puppetry" to show two birds struggling to find food for their chicks. Colby used hand shadows to produce the images of birds, spiders and landscapes, which were there composited together digitally. Text at the end of the video explains that since 1966, the UK has lost over 40 million birds and that "time is running out to save the rest". The RSPB also created a subtitled video, highlighting the name of each bird as it sings.

== Reception ==
Andy Welch, writing for The Guardian, called "Let Nature Sing" "strangely comforting and a welcome sound for anyone who has ever enjoyed a dawn chorus". Joe Shute in the Daily Telegraph described its appearance during The Official Chart Show as "rather magical".

== Chart performance ==
"Let Nature Sing" debuted at number 11 in the mid-week chart, and reached number 3 in the Official Trending Chart, with a final position of 18 in the full weekly chart. The single was the best-selling of the week, with 23,500 units sold.

=== Weekly charts ===
Chart	Peak position
UK Singles (OCC)	18
UK Indie (OCC)	2

== See also ==
- Birdsong (radio channel)
