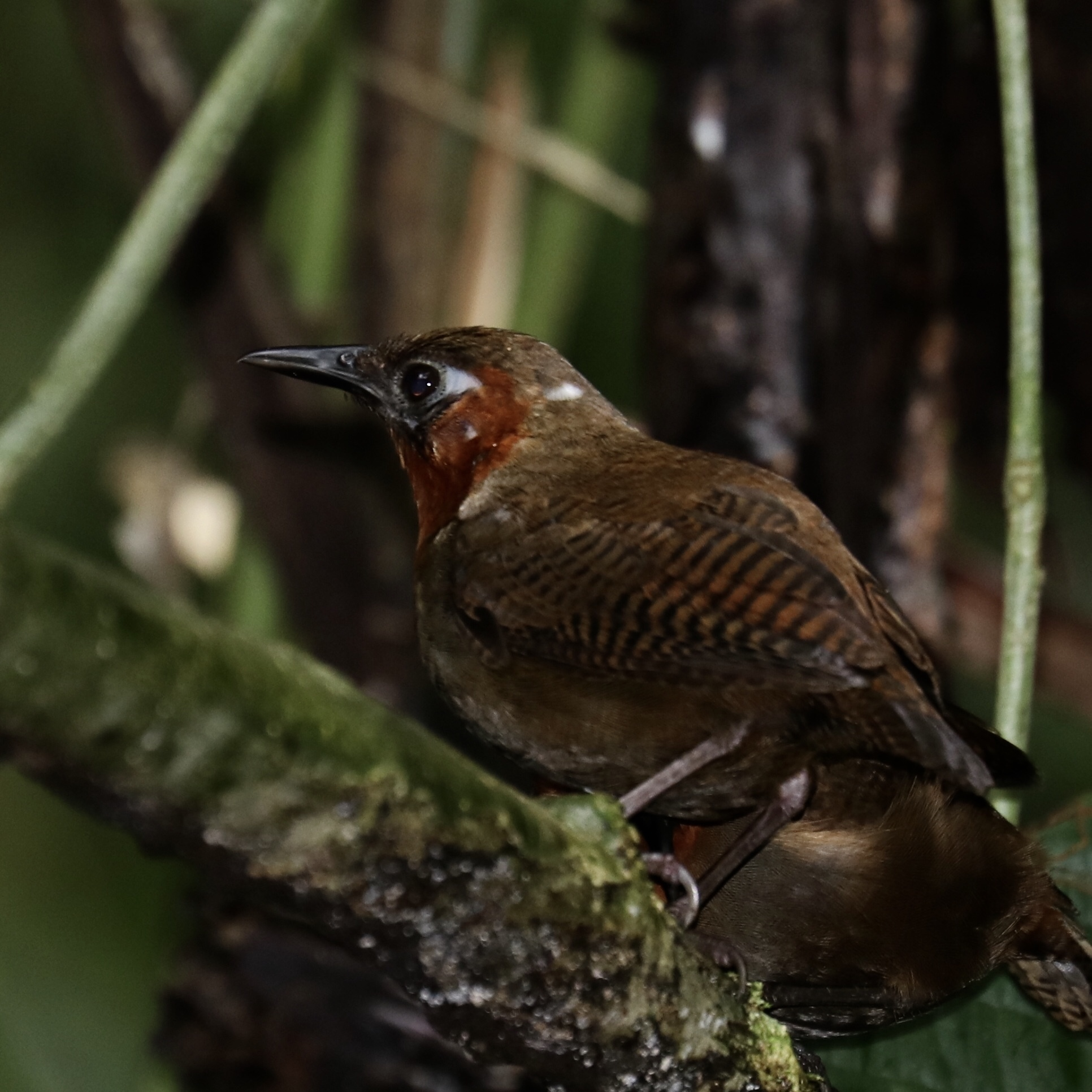
- In Panama

Conservation status
- Least Concern (IUCN 3.1)

Scientific classification
- Domain: Eukaryota
- Kingdom: Animalia
- Phylum: Chordata
- Class: Aves
- Order: Passeriformes
- Family: Troglodytidae
- Genus: Cyphorhinus
- Species: C. phaeocephalus

Binomial name
- Cyphorhinus phaeocephalus Sclater, PL, 1860

= Song wren =

Species of bird

The song wren (Cyphorhinus phaeocephalus) is a species of bird in the family Troglodytidae. It is found in Colombia, Costa Rica, Ecuador, Honduras, Nicaragua, and Panama.

== Taxonomy and systematics ==
At one time the song wren and the musician wren (Cyphorhinus arada) were considered conspecific. They, and possibly chestnut-breasted wren (C. thoracicus), form a superspecies.

The International Ornithological Committee (IOC) and BirdLife International (BLI) recognize the six subspecies listed below. The Clements taxonomy does not recognize C. p. chocoanus.

- C. p. richardsonii Salvin (1893)
- C. p. infuscatus Zimmer (1932)
- C. p. lawrencii Lawrence (1863)
- C. p. propinquus Todd (1919)
- C. p. chocoanus Meyer de Schauensee (1946)
- C. p. phaeocephalus Sclater (1860)

== Description ==
The song wren is 11.5 to 12.5 cm (4.5 to 4.9 in) long and weighs 25 to 26 g (0.88 to 0.92 oz). Its body is nearly uniformly brown, though sometimes paler on the breast. It has a chestnut throat and black bars on the wings and its very short tail. It has a patch of bare blue skin around the eye. The subspecies have some variations in color and intensity, and extensive descriptive details can be found in Pollock and Agin (2020).

== Distribution and habitat ==
The subspecies of song wren are distributed thus:

- C. p. richardsonii, Caribbean side of southeastern Honduras and eastern Nicaragua
- C. p. infuscatus, Caribbean side of Costa Rica and northwestern Panama
- C. p. lawrencii, central Panama into extreme northwestern Colombia
- C. p. propinquus, northern Colombia
- C. p. chocoanus, western Colombia
- C. p. phaeocephalus, southwestern Colombia to southern Ecuador

The song wren inhabits the interiors of lowland primary and secondary forest, especially those with much undergrowth. It shuns dry landscapes and well lighted areas.

== Behavior ==
=== Feeding ===
The song wren forages almost exclusively on the forest floor, tossing and probing leaf litter. It is usually seen in pairs or small family groups. In the only detailed study of its diet, almost half of the prey was spiders with other small invertebrates making up most of the rest.

=== Breeding ===
The song wren constructs both dormitory nests for roosting and breeding nests. Both are gourd-shaped and constructed mostly of rootlets, strips of palm frond, and small twigs lined with leaf skeletons. Breeding nests have a well-defined cup that is sometimes lined with small feathers. Nests are constructed and maintained almost year-round. Breeding nests are placed in understory trees, often Acacia trees that also host Pseudomyrmex ants. The female alone incubates the eggs and broods the young.

=== Vocalization ===
The song wren's song has been described as "clear, melodious whistles superimposed on harsh, henlike clucking". Both sexes sing year round to defend a territory. Variations in song between the sexes and in different parts of the range have been noted but not systematically studied.

== Status ==
The IUCN has assessed the song wren as being of Least Concern. They are fairly common throughout their large range. However, habitat disturbance and fragmentation appear to negatively effect them, and their population is thought to be declining.
