= Travel log =

Travel log or Travel Log may refer to:

- Travel literature, records of a traveler's experiences
- Travel-Log, album by JJ Cale
- Travel Log, a vehicle built by Charles Kellogg
