= Romano Bianchi =

Romano Bianchi is a musician and author from Geneva. He plays in numerous bands and appears frequently in media. His music can be heard in TV series such as Emily in Paris and Sneaky Pete. He did the first part of Angèle at Paleo. In 2024, he composed an album based on insects sounds.
