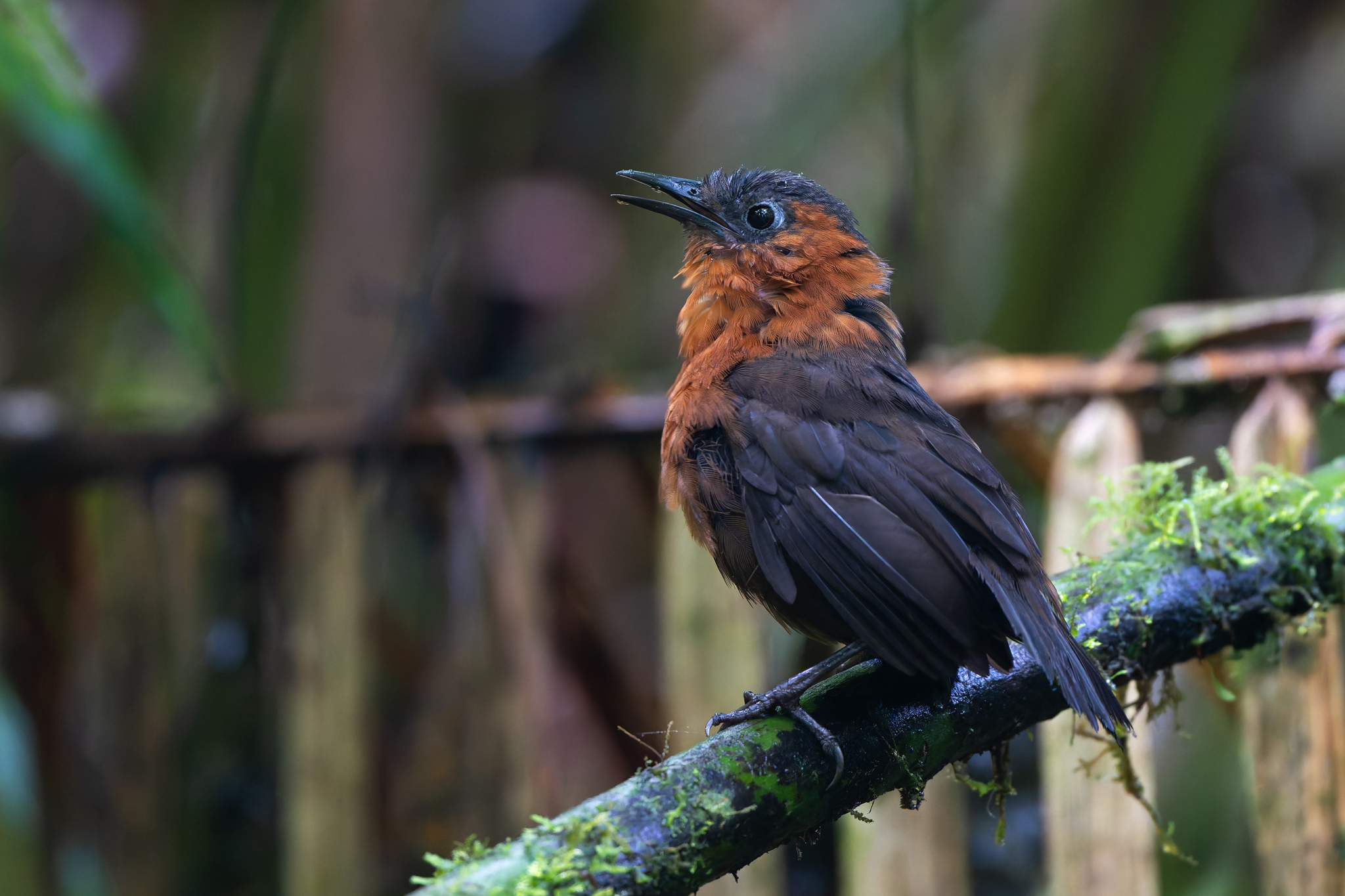

Conservation status
- Least Concern (IUCN 3.1)

Scientific classification
- Kingdom: Animalia
- Phylum: Chordata
- Class: Aves
- Order: Passeriformes
- Family: Troglodytidae
- Genus: Cyphorhinus
- Species: C. dichrous

Binomial name
- Cyphorhinus dichrous Sclater, PL & Salvin, 1879

= Northern chestnut-breasted wren =

Species of bird

The northern chestnut-breasted wren (Cyphorhinus dichrous) is a species of passerine bird in the wren family Troglodytidae that is found in central Colombia, Ecuador and northern Peru. It was formerly considered as a subspecies of the chestnut-breasted wren (Cyphorhinus thoracicus) now renamed the southern chestnut-breasted wren.

== Taxonomy ==
The northern chestnut-breasted wren was formally described in 1879 by the English ornithologists Philip Sclater and Osbert Salvin based on a specimen collected near the town of Remedios in Colombia. They coined the binomial name Cyphorhinus dichrous where the specific epithet is from Ancient Greek meaning "two-coloured". The northern chestnut-breasted wren was formerly considered as a subspecies of the chestnut-breasted wren (Cyphorhinus thoracicus) now renamed the southern chestnut-breasted wren. The species were split based on the significant vocal differences despite the minor difference in plumage color. The species is monotypic: no subspecies are recognised.
