= One Dark Night I Left My Silent House =

Studio album by Marilyn Crispell and David Rothenberg
- Released: 2010
- Recorded: March 2008
- Studio: Nevassa Studio; Woodstock, New York
- Genre: Free jazz
- Label: ECM Records; ECM 2089
- Producer: David Rothenberg, Marilyn Crispell

One Dark Night I Left My Silent House is an album by pianist Marilyn Crispell and clarinetist David Rothenberg, recorded in March 2008 and released on ECM in 2010. The album, which is entirely improvised, is named after Peter Handke's novel In einer dunklen Nacht ging ich aus meinem stillen Haus. In addition to playing piano, Crispell also employs percussion instruments and "an old beat-up piano soundboard wrenched out of an old baby grand."

== Reception ==
Professional ratings
Review scores
Source	Rating
AllMusic	4/5 stars
All About Jazz	4.5/5 stars
PopMatters	9/10 stars
The Guardian	3/5 stars
BBC Music Magazine	5/5 stars

In a review for AllMusic, Michael G. Nastos wrote: "The liquid piano sound of Crispell and the pithy, earthy, throat tones of Rothenberg's bass clarinet in the main shapeshift back and forth during this mercurial program of deep blue, darkest night, after-hours modern jazz. It's not so much programmed as it states anchors of melody and centerpieces of coalesced thought process, rambles into free discourse, then returns to an identity... As intriguing as it is deep, spiritual, and compelling, these two have chemistry bubbling under the surface, with the kind of geothermic energy available to slightly warm up any living space, vacant or not."

John Kelman, writing for All About Jazz, called the album "an unequivocal success," and commented: "A unique recording in Crispell's overall discography, the aptly titled One Dark Night I Left My Silent House is a unique travelogue with the equally unconstrained but spatially inclined Rothenberg, for whom this ECM debut hopefully represents the beginning of a long-term partnership."

In an article for PopMatters, Ron Hart stated: "Crispell does wonders with the quietude of her locale... as she and Rothenberg create a stirring ambience that belies its improvisational nature. One Dark Night I Left My Silent House is one of the calmest, loveliest duo albums to come out on ECM in all of the 41 year existence of Manfred Eicher's storied jazz label."

Critic John Fordham remarked: "Crispell has become a more undemonstrative player in recent times, motivated by a growing desire to eschew familiarly stylised forms. Much of the music on this delicate, nuance-savouring set finds her laying carpets of enquiring chords, strummed-strings sounds and metallic effects beneath Rothenberg's mingling of the clarinet subtleties of Jimmy Giuffre and the tonal adventurousness of Joe Maneri... The jazz connections of both are plain, even if it might seem an exclusively private dialogue to some."

BBC Music Magazine's Barry Witherden stated that, on the album, Crispell's piano playing is "as clean, and precise yet passionate as ever. If it seems less ferocious than her early work, it is no less mesmerising." Rothenberg "paces Crispell in whatever realms they chance upon. His work on both horns is fluent, full-toned, imbued with a strong structure." Witherden concluded: "If these pieces were pre-composed they’d be categorised as chamber music of a high order."

Writing for Elsewhere, Graham Reid commented: "this is an album that walks the woods at night, listens to the ancient branches creak and yawn, and spends time quietly observing the fresh gentle fall of snow in deep and dark forests." Crispell "has swum a long way from the turbulent waters of Cecil Taylor and Anthony Braxton for this one."

== Track listing ==
All compositions by Marilyn Crispell and David Rothenberg.

1. "Invocation" – 3:33
2. "Tsering" – 4:57
3. "The Hawk and the Mouse" – 6:27
4. "Stay, Stray" – 4:57
5. "What Birds Sing" – 2:17
6. "Companion: Silence" – 3:27
7. "Owl Moon" – 6:58
8. "Still Life with Woodpeckers" – 4:18
9. "Grosbeak" – 4:42
10. "The Way of Pure Sound (For Joe Maneri)" – 5:52
11. "Motmot" – 3:45
12. "Snow Suddenly Stopping Without Notice" – 6:48
13. "Evocation" – 4:20

== Personnel ==
- Marilyn Crispell – piano, percussion, soundboard
- David Rothenberg – clarinet, bass clarinet
