= David Rothenberg =

American professor of philosophy and music

David Rothenberg (born 1962) is a professor of philosophy and music at the New Jersey Institute of Technology, with a special interest in animal sounds as music. He is also a composer and jazz musician whose books and recordings reflect a longtime interest in understanding other species such as singing insects by making music with them.

== Life and work ==
Rothenberg graduated from Harvard and took his PhD from Boston University.

Looking back at his high school years in the 1970s, Rothenberg told Claudia Dreifus of The New York Times, "I was influenced by saxophonist Paul Winter's Common Ground album, which had his own compositions with whale and bird sounds mixed in. That got me interested in using music to learn more about the natural world."

As an undergraduate at Harvard, Rothenberg created his own major to combine music with communication. He traveled in Europe after graduation, playing jazz clarinet. Listening to the recorded song of a hermit thrush, he heard structure that reminded him of a Miles Davis solo.

Because of Rothenberg's study of animal song and his experimental interactions with animal music, he is often called an "interspecies musician." According to Andrew Revkin, he "explores the sounds of all manner of living things as both an environmental philosopher and jazz musician."

Rothenberg is a professor of philosophy and music at the New Jersey Institute of Technology, with a special interest in animal sounds as music.

== Publications ==
=== Books ===
Rothenberg's book Why Birds Sing: A Journey into the Mystery of Bird Song (Basic Books, 2005) was inspired by an impromptu duet in March 2000 with a laughingthrush at the National Aviary in Pittsburgh. In the wild, male and female laughingthrushes sing complex duets, so "jamming" with a human clarinet player was closely related to the bird's natural behavior. A CD accompanying the book also featured Rothenberg's duet with an Australian lyrebird. The book served as the basis for a 2006 BBC documentary of the same name.

Rothenberg's book Thousand Mile Song (Basic Books, 2008) reflects similar curiosity about whale sounds considered as music. He seeks out both scientific and artistic insights into the phenomenon. Philip Hoare said of the book, "..while Rothenberg's madcap mission to play jazz to the whales seems as crazy as Captain Ahab's demented hunt for the great White Whale, it is sometimes such obsessions that reveal inner truths...I find myself more than a little sympathetic to the author's faintly bonkers but undoubtedly stimulating intent: to push at the barriers between human history and natural history."

His book Survival of the Beautiful: Art, Science and Evolution (Bloomsbury Press, 2011) was described by the journal Nature in this way: "Rothenberg covers topics such as camouflage, abstraction, the profound impact of art on science and much more to explore his theme [that beauty is not random but is intrinsic to life—and that evolution proceeds by sumptuousness, not by utility alone]." Roald Hoffmann said of the book, "David Rothenberg is a brilliantly fun guide on a journey that takes us from bower birds to the neuroesthetics of Semir Zeki. Survival of the Beautiful is just about the best travel literature of the mind out there. With wit by turns gentle and sharp, Rothenberg shows us how art is shaped by animals, and by us." Peter Forbes, writing in The Guardian, calls the book "immensely fertile", bringing together ideas from Charles Darwin, Ernst Haeckel, and D'Arcy Wentworth Thompson. Forbes praises Rothenberg's "innocent eye for the telling image", enjoying his treatment of the bowerbirds.

Bug Music, a book about insects and music, was published by St Martins Press in 2013. He began this project at the 2006 International Arts Pestival in London. During the 2011 emergence of Brood XIX periodical cicadas, Rothenberg was the subject of a YouTube video as he played saxophone to accompany the mating calls of Magicicada tredecassini.

Nightingales in Berlin: Searching for the Perfect Sounds, was published by The University of Chicago Press in 2019. The book follows the urban landscape of Berlin—longtime home to nightingale colonies where the birds sing ever louder in order to be heard—and invites the reader to listen in on their remarkable collaboration as birds and instruments riff off of each other's sounds.

=== Music ===
Rothenberg has recorded at least 9 albums in his own name, and has performed or recorded music with Peter Gabriel and other jazz musicians. Many of the albums have been on the Terra Nova label.

- 1992 Nobody Could Explain It (Accurate 4004)
- 1995: On the Cliffs of the Heart (Newtone 6744) with Marilyn Crispell, Robi Droli; named one of the top ten releases of the year by JAZZIZ Magazine
- 2005: Why Birds Sing (Terra Nova), released the same year as his book of the same name
- 2006: Sudden Music (Terra Nova), released with the book of the same title, eleven compositions by Rothenberg, including White Crested Laugh[ing], featured on Why Birds Sing
- 2008: Whale Music (Terra Nova), released with the book Thousand Mile Song; features Robert Jurgendal and Nils Okland
- 2009: Whale Music Remixed (Terra Nova), with contributions from Scanner, DJ Spooky, Lukas Ligeti, Mira Calix, Ben Neill, and Robert Rich
- 2010: One Dark Night I Left My Silent House (ECM Records), with Marilyn Crispell on piano.
- 2011: Expulsion of the Triumphant Beast (Terra Nova), with pianist Lewis Porter
- 2011: You Can't Get There From Here (monotype 038), with Scanner
- 2011: Fifty Bucks and I'll Show You (Berger Platters), by the band Painted Betty: "friends in Cold Spring"
- 2013: Bug Music (Terra Nova), released with the book of the same name, features cicadas, crickets, katydids, leafhoppers, and water bugs as well as Jürjendal, Hill, and Umru Rothenberg
- 2014: Cicada Dream Band (Terra Nova), featuring composer and accordionist Pauline Oliveros, overtone singer Timothy Hill (of the Harmonic Choir), and cicadas in New York
- 2015: Berlin Bülbül (Terra Nova), with Korhan Erel and nightingales in Berlin ("Bülbül" is Turkish for "nightingale")
- 2016: And Vex the Nightingale (Terra Nova), with accordionist Lucie Vítková and a nightingale in Berlin
- 2019: Nightingales in Berlin (Terra Nova), with Cymin Samawatie, Korhan Erel, Lembe Lokk, Sanna Salmenkallio, Volker Lankow, Ines Theileis, Wassim Mukdad.

Since 2014, Rothenberg has been an Ambassador of the international non-governmental humanitarian mission the Dolphin Embassy, participating in non-invasive research of the possibilities of free dolphins and whales – playing music for them. In 2017, the Dolphin Embassy released the full-length documentary Intraterrestrial, which received awards from international film festivals. The film's soundtrack features music by Rothenberg.

Rothenberg's music appears in Imogene Drummond's animations Sparky (3', 2009) and Divine Sparks (30', 2012)

In the short drama Whales (14', 2009, directed by Thomas Barnes) there are original whale recordings by Rothenberg.

Reviewing One Dark Night I Left My Silent House, Svenska Dagbladet wrote that Rothenberg and Crispell, "create a moment of beauty," with, "a searching minimalism," and awarded the maximum six stars. The album was well received by other critics.
