= Alexander Liebermann =

German-French composer of classical music

Alexander Liebermann (born 1989) is a German-French composer of classical music based in New York City. He is best known for transcribing birdsongs into musical notation and sharing them on social media. He incorporates bird calls into his classical music compositions, which have been performed around the world.

== Early life and education ==
Liebermann was educated at the Hochschule für Musik Hanns Eisler in Berlin before earning a master's degree at the Juilliard School in New York City. While a student at Juilliard, Liebermann wrote Rondeaux, a two-part composition inspired by French medieval poets Alain Chartier and Charles d'Orléans. He remained in New York after graduating Juilliard to obtain a doctorate in music theory and composition from the Manhattan School of Music, where his thesis on Czech pianist and composer Erwin Schulhoff was awarded the Saul Braverman Award in Music Theory.

== Career ==
While quarantining in Berlin during the COVID-19 pandemic, Liebermann began listening attentively to recordings of birdsongs online, transcribing them onto sheet music, and composing music that incorporates the bird calls. He describes birdsongs as "unpredictable, haunting... spine-tingling calls" that are themselves a form of music. His interest in integrating birdsongs into classical compositions began during a visit to Costa Rica in February 2020. Since beginning his musical study of birds, Lieberman has translated calls from many bird species into modern staff notation for sheet music, including the uirapuru, the common loon, the thrush nightingale, the white bellbird, the Chinese hwamei, the uguisu, the common peafowl, the oropendola, the cuckoo, and the Javan pied starling, among others.

In 2018, Liebermann was commissioned to compose a climate-themed melodrama for the Deutsche Oper Berlin. The work, titled Erwachen, turns on the experience of a young girl in the future as she reflects on her ancestors' failure to confront the threat of climate change. In 2022, he published his debut book, Birdsong: A Musical Field Guide.

When not composing his own music, Liebermann teaches at the Juilliard School.
