= Edward Avis =

American performer

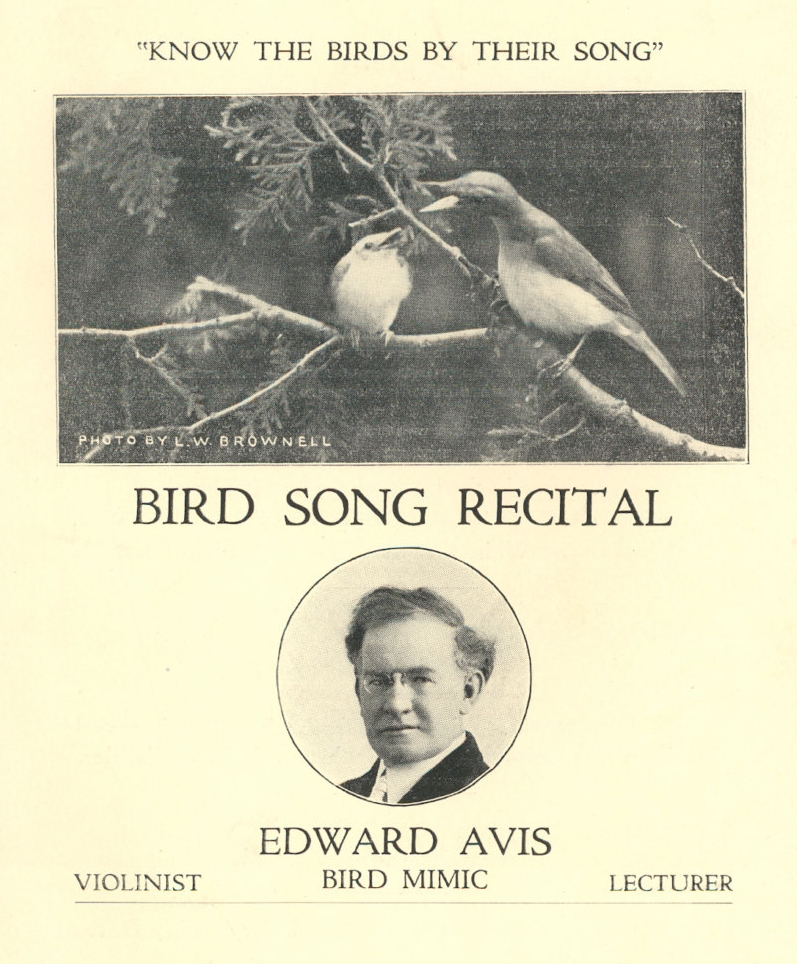
Promotional brochure of "Edward Avis" c. 1920

Edward Avis was the stage name of Martin E. Sullivan (1872 - 1955?), an American violinist and stage performer known for his imitations of birdsongs. He performed on the stage in New England and was referred to by the press as "The Bird Man".

Sullivan was born in Enfield, Connecticut, and as you child he was said to go into the "woods with his violin and strike up a chorus among the birds". He learned the songs of birds around the United States and began to write down their songs, whistle them and produce melodies. He performed for gatherings of the Audubon Societies. A review of a performance in January 1908 "An Evening in Birdland" given to members of the Audubon Society at the George Washington University said:

His whistling is a natural gift, but his bird songs are the result of constant study and close companionship with birds. Mr Avis adopts a standard in his study of bird music. As he hears a bird's song, he writes it down, whistles it repeatedly, perfects it by study and practice, and the results are his wonderful little melodies. These melodies were a feature of his lecture last night. Stereopticon pictures were thrown on the screen, Mr Avis would whistle bird songs and one could almost imagine it was summer.

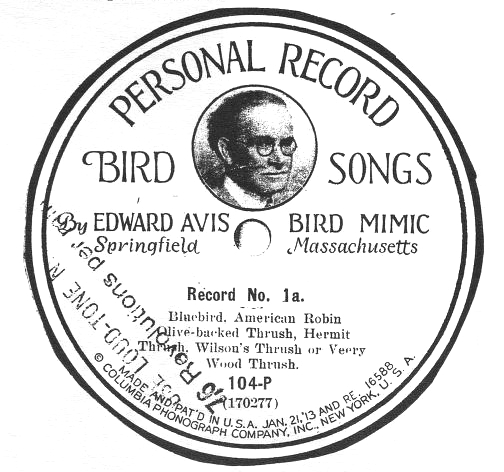
Cover of a 1927 LP

Avis was a careful imitator of birds and he often performed before academic audiences. He also included a mix of his mimicry with the violin. He also performed for blind audiences. He was a contemporary of Charles Crawford Gorst, Charles Kellogg and several others who specialized in the imitation of birds. His promotional brochures included reviews by John Burroughs and Winthrop Packard. Many recordings were made by Avis for Columbia Records and after the rise in popularity of the radio, he also contributed to radio shows.

He was interested in conservation and sponsored a 100 dollar reward for anyone who could find an undisturbed nest of the passenger pigeon in Connecticut as part of a national campaign to rescue the bird from extinction in 1910.
