= Birdsong (radio channel) =

UK temporary radio channel

Birdsong was a temporary radio channel which used to broadcast on national digital radio in the United Kingdom. The transmission consisted of a continuously looping recording of bird song. It was available via the Digital One DAB network. The recording was also available via the Digital One website until Autumn 2009 and the RadioBirdsong website. Originally starting out as a test signal on analogue radio in 1992 and then later broadcast on digital radio from 2003 to 2005, the channel gained regular listeners, who complained when it was taken off-air. In 2008–2009, the broadcast again existed as a 'filler' transmission until a commercially operated radio station, Amazing Radio, replaced it on 1 June 2009. On 27 December 2019, the channel returned to digital radio once again in the Portsmouth area.

== Overview ==
When financial news station Bloomberg and rolling news station ITN News Radio ceased to broadcast within several months of one another in 2003, replacement audio services were never found due to a commitment in Digital One's broadcasting licence to provide a news station. This resulted in a station playing a 36 minutes and 56 seconds loop of birdsong and ambient sounds, entitled 'D1 Temp' which broadcast for almost two years. In June 2005, the capacity formerly used by the speech services, and later by the birdsong, was given over to a test transmission of video to mobile phones known as BT Movio.

When the magazine-format digital radio station Oneword ceased in January 2008, the birdsong audio once again returned to the multiplex on the Oneword channel and the service name of the DAB channel changed to "Birdsong".

== The recording ==
The dawn birdsong was recorded in autumn of 1991, on the edge of Salisbury Plain in the Wiltshire garden of Quentin Howard, the chairman of Digital One. The tape was originally made for an amateur dramatics production of When the Wind Blows by Raymond Briggs, which was in need of countryside sound effects, and was first heard on-air during test transmissions between July and September 1992 prior to the launch of Classic FM. It has featured in a number of TV and radio reports including Countryfile in 2008 and on BBC Breakfast TV.

== Reception ==
Some listeners have found the recording a relaxing alternative to other stations. However, other listeners have been annoyed by the sounds of crows crowing and gunshot-like sounds of wood cracking, as it expands in the morning sun. Several stories have appeared about some of the sounds heard in the recording, which are explained on the Radio Birdsong website. One listener was able to identify at least twelve distinct species of bird in the recording.

Listeners complained when transmission ceased in 2005. In 2008, the transmission was reported in the press as gaining more attention than the spoken-word programmes of Oneword, and even of attracting half a million listeners.

== Closure ==
In 2009, Glyn Jones, acting chief executive of Digital One stated that "Birdsong has been more popular with journalists than real listeners", pointing out that there was never any real evidence for the figure of half a million listeners.

Quentin Howard was quoted in several newspaper articles, including The Guardian, that he did not know why "the birds have been killed", but he suspected it might be to create publicity for the new channel."

Birdsong was removed from the Digital One multiplex at 23:59:59 on Sunday 31 May 2009 to allow for the launch of Amazing Radio. The original birdsong recording used by Classic FM and Digital One continues to be available online via the Digital One website and from the official Radio Birdsong website.

Birdsong Radio made a temporary return to digital radio in January 2014 after Jazz FM ceased broadcasting on the Digital One platform, before LBC began airing nationally from 11 February.

== Reprieve ==
Without prior notice Birdsong returned to digital radio on 27 December 2019 on the Portsmouth small scale DAB multiplex as a DAB+ service. On 1 April 2020 Birdsong was also added to the Glasgow small scale multiplex.

== See also ==
- Let Nature Sing
