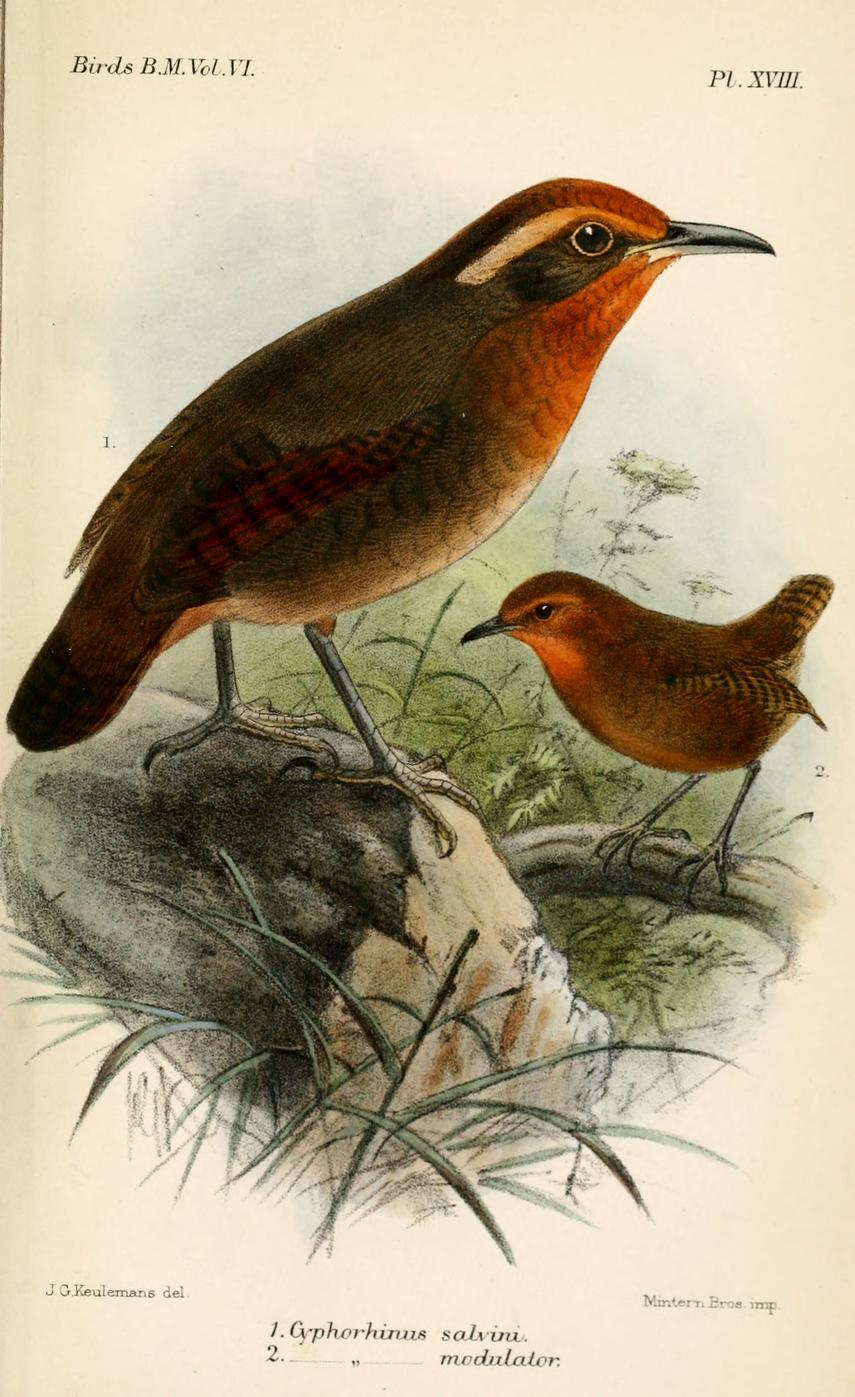
- Musician wren (Cyphorhinus arada)

Scientific classification
- Kingdom: Animalia
- Phylum: Chordata
- Class: Aves
- Order: Passeriformes
- Family: Troglodytidae
- Genus: Cyphorhinus; Cabanis, 1844

Type species
- Cyphorhinus thoracicus (southern chestnut-breasted wren) Tschudi, 1844

= Cyphorhinus =

Genus of birds

Cyphorhinus, from Ancient Greek κύφος (kúphos), meaning "hump" or "hunch", and ῥίς (rhís), meaning "nose" (or, in this case, bill), is a genus of passerine birds in the wren family Troglodytidae that are found in South and Central America.

== Taxonomy ==
The genus Cyphorhinus was introduced in 1844 by the German ornithologist Jean Cabanis to accommodate a single species Cyphorhinus thoracicus (southern chestnut-breasted wren) that was described at the same time by Johann Jakob von Tschudi and is therefore considered as the type species. The genus name comes from Ancient Greek κύφος (kúphos), meaning "hump" or "hunch", and ῥίς (rhís), meaning "nose" (or, in this case, bill). It has been emended from the earlier incarnation Cyphorhina.

The genus contains four species:

- Northern chestnut-breasted wren, Cyphorhinus dichrous (split from C. thoracicus)
- Southern chestnut-breasted wren, Cyphorhinus thoracicus
- Musician wren, Cyphorhinus arada
- Song wren, Cyphorhinus phaeocephalus
