= Luis Felipe Baptista =

American ornithologist (1941–2000)

- Born: August 9, 1941; Hong Kong
- Died: June 12, 2000 (aged 58); Sebastopol, California
- Education: University of San Francisco; University of California, Berkeley
- Scientific career
- Fields: Ornithology
- Workplaces: California Academy of Sciences

Luis Felipe Baptista (9 August 1941 – 12 June 2000) was an American ornithologist. He was considered an international expert on bioacoustics, animal behavior and avian systematics.

== Early life ==
Luis Felipe Baptista was born in Hong Kong to a Macanese family that had lived on the Portuguese colony of Macau since the 17th century. Growing up, Batista would sing and whistle at the birds, realizing that they learned tunes from imitation and developing a talent of bird impersonation. He grew up in a Chinese community. Batista resided in Hong Kong and Macau until 1961, when he emigrated to San Francisco as a teenager where he took up a job at the California Academy of Sciences as a curatorial assistant.

== Education ==
During his years at the Academy of Sciences, he developed an interest in ornithology under the influence of zoologist Robert T. Orr, then chairman and curator of the Department of Ornithology and Mammalogy. He earned bachelor's and master's degrees at the University of San Francisco and was admitted to the University of California at Berkeley in 1968 for a Ph.D. in zoology. His doctoral research on the song behavior of the White-crowned Sparrow (Zonotrichia leucophrys), supervised by Ned K. Johnson, led to a series of studies that established him as a leading expert of bird vocalization, vocal learning and bird dialects through the rest of his academic career.

== Research ==
After earning his PhD in 1975, Baptista continued his research in Germany as a postdoc under Klaus Immelmann and as a fellow at the Max Planck Institute of Physiology and Behavior (now part of the Max Planck Institute of Animal Behavior), mentored by Hans Löhrl. In 1973, he became an assistant professor at Occidental College in Los Angeles, where he also served as the curator of the Moore Laboratory of Zoology. From 1980 until his death in 2000, Baptista held the positions of curator of birds and chairman of the department of ornithology and mammalogy at the California Academy of Sciences, becoming a fellow of the academy in 1982.

Baptista conducted extensive research internationally, publishing over 120 scholarly articles. His field work in California and in the San Francisco Bay Are in particular made his regular appearance with a tape recorder, a parabolic reflector and a microphone a fixture in the local birdwatching and conservation community. Local newspapers and magazines referred to him as "Birdman Extraordinaire," "The Sparrow Man of Golden Gate Park," "The Man Who Speaks Sparrow," and "Maestro of the Bird Symphony."

Baptista served on the council (1982–1984) and the International Ornithological Committee (1982–2000) of the American Ornithologists Union, where he became a fellow in 1980. He was also a member of the Cooper Ornithological Society (COS), of which he became an honorary member in 1996. He died unexpectedly in Sebastopol, California, in 2000.
