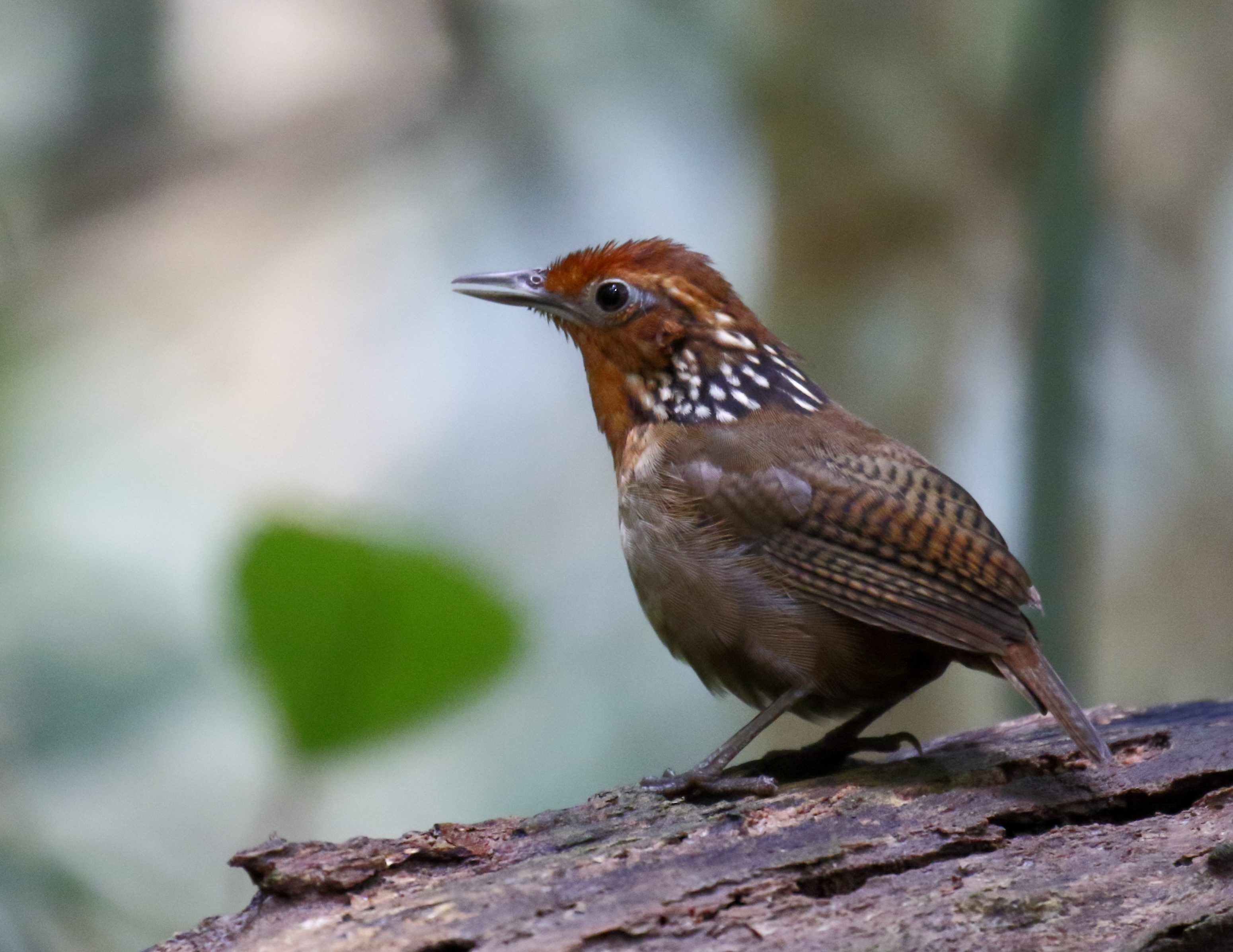
- At Presidente Figueiredo, Amazonas, Brazil

Conservation status
- Least Concern (IUCN 3.1)

Scientific classification
- Domain: Eukaryota
- Kingdom: Animalia
- Phylum: Chordata
- Class: Aves
- Order: Passeriformes
- Family: Troglodytidae
- Genus: Cyphorhinus
- Species: C. arada

Binomial name
- Cyphorhinus arada (Hermann, 1783)

Synonyms
- Cyphorhinus salvini; Cyphorhinus modulator; Leucolepis modulator

= Musician wren =

Species of bird

The musician wren or organ wren (Cyphorhinus arada) is a species of wren named for its elaborate song. It is native to the Amazon rainforest in South America, from the lowlands into the foothills of the Andes.

== Taxonomy and systematics ==
At one time the musician wren and the song wren (Cyphorhinus phaeocephalus) were considered conspecific. They, and possibly chestnut-breasted wren (C. thoracicus), form a superspecies.

The musician wren has the six recognized subspecies listed below. There are vocal and plumage differences among them, and one publication has proposed splitting all six into individual species.

The six subspecies are:

- C. a. arada Hermann (1783)
- C. a. griseolateralis Ridgway (1888)
- C. a. interpositus Todd (1932)
- C. a. transfluvialis Todd (1932)
- C. a. salvini Sharpe (1882)
- C. a. modulator d'Orbigny (1838)

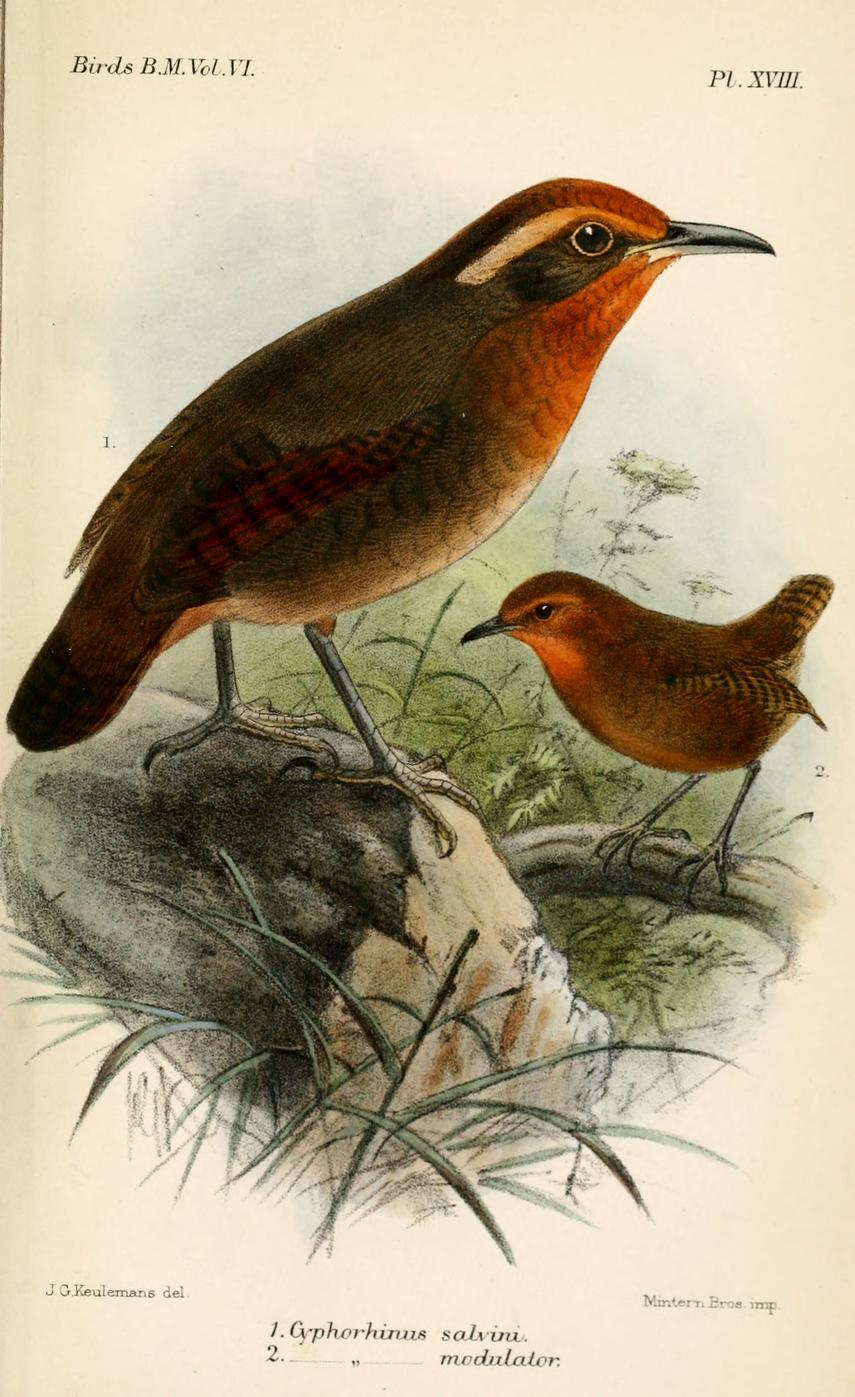
Subspecies C. a. salvini (left), and C. a. modulator (right), illustration by Keulemans, 1881

== Description ==
The musician wren is 12.5 cm (4.9 in) long and weighs 18 to 24 g (0.63 to 0.85 oz). The adult of the nominate subspecies has a rufous forehead and forecrown that darkens to chesnut brown to the rear. It has a narrow pale buff supercilium with narrower black borders, a chestnut brown stripe behind the eye, and orange-brown cheeks. It has a broad "collar" streaked black and white lengthwise on its nape and upper back. The lower back and rump are a colder reddish brown than the crown and the tail is medium brown with narrow darker brown bars. Its chin, throat, and upper chest are a bright orange-brown with a sharp change to the pale buff lower chest and upper belly. The flanks and lower belly are yellowish brown. The juvenile is similar but sometimes has faint barring on it lower belly.

C. a. griseolateralis has a thinner collar than the nominate and is grayer below. C. a. interpositus does not have the nominate's collar and its cheeks are brownish gray. C. a. transfluvialis is smaller and paler than the nominate. C. a. salvini also does not have the nominate's collar and is very dark overall. C. a. modulator is similar to transfluvialis but it has a broader supercilium and its upperparts are lighter.

== Distribution and habitat ==
The subspecies of the musician wren are found thus:

- C. a. arada, eastern and southeastern Venezuela, the Guianas, and northeastern Brazil
- C. a. griseolateralis, Brazil, on the south bank of the lower Amazon River from Rio Tapajós eastward and south to Rio Jamanxim
- C. a. interpositus, north central Brazil between Rio Madeira and Rio Tapajós and south into northern Mato Grosso
- C. a. transfluvialis, from the foothills of Colombia's Eastern Andes east to Rio Negro in northwestern Brazil
- C. a. salvini, southern Colombia, eastern Ecuador, and northeastern Peru
- C. a. modulator, eastern Peru, northern Bolivia, and western Brazil south of the Amazon as far east as Rio Madeira

The musician wren generally inhabits the lower levels of humid forest; in Brazil it is also found in várzea. In elevation in mostly ranges from sea level to 500 m (1,600 ft) but is found occasionally as high as 1,000 m (3,300 ft) and even, in Venezuela, to 1,400 m (4,600 ft).

== Behavior ==
=== Feeding ===
The musician wren forages primarily on and near the ground, searching debris and leaf litter. Its diet is mostly invertebrates, including insects, spiders, and crustaceans, but it also eats berries. It usually forages in pairs or family parties. Though it sometimes follows army ant swarms it does not usually join mixed-species foraging flocks.

=== Breeding ===
The musician wren has a protracted breeding season, spanning at least July to September. Its nest is sperical with entrance through a funnel-shaped neck, constructed of leaf skeletons and coarse grass. Two eggs are laid.

=== Vocalization ===
Members of a musician wren pair sing antiphonally, "a series of clear, haunting whistles, varying greatly in pitch". The call is "a harsh 'churk'".

== In popular culture ==
In Portuguese it is known as uirapuru or many other variants of this name, all based on the Tupi wirapu 'ru. Especially in Brazil, the musician wren is the subject of several legends and fables, most relating to its loud and beautiful song. One of these tells that when it starts singing all other birds stop their song to hear it. The musician wren is also believed to bring good luck, which leads some people to kill it in order to have it stuffed. Heitor Villa-Lobos composed a piece he named Uirapuru.

== Status ==
The IUCN has assessed the musician wren as being of Least Concern. It has a large range and much of it remains undisturbed. It occurs in several protected areas.
