= Insects in music =

Insects as musical inspiration

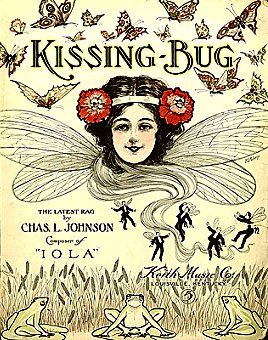
"Kissing-Bug" ragtime by Charles L. Johnson, 1909

Insects have appeared in music from Rimsky-Korsakov's "Flight of the Bumblebee" to such popular songs as "Blue-tailed Fly" and the folk song "La Cucaracha" which is about a cockroach. Insect groups mentioned include bees, ants, flies and the various singing insects such as cicadas, crickets, and beetles, while other songs refer to bugs in general.

== Overview ==
Insects including bees, cicadas, crickets and grasshoppers produce sounds, whether by flying or by stridulation, attracting human interest. Insect sounds have accordingly been the inspiration for a variety of forms of music. Among Western composers, Nikolai Rimsky-Korsakov imitates the quick buzzing vibrato of the bumblebee in his famous "Flight of the Bumblebee"; Edvard Grieg was inspired by flies in his Said the Gadfly to the Fly. Popular songs with an insect theme include "The Glow-Worm", "Poor Butterfly", "La Cucaracha", "The Boll Weevil", and "The Blue-Tailed Fly". Operas like Puccini's Madama Butterfly and Albert Roussel's ballet Le Festin de l'araignée (The Spider's Feast similarly reference arthropods. Pop groups named after insects include Buddy Holly and The Crickets, The Beatles, Adam and the Ants and many others. And some fictional crickets in Western popular culture, like Jiminy Cricket and Cri-Cri have been known to sing.

== In classical music ==
The French Renaissance composer Josquin des Prez, working in Italy, wrote a piece in the style of a frottola entitled El Grillo (lit. 'The Cricket'). It is among the most frequently sung of his works.

Carol Williams performs "Flight of the Bumblebee" by Nikolai Rimsky-Korsakov.

Nikolai Rimsky-Korsakov wrote "Flight of the Bumblebee" as an orchestral interlude for his opera The Tale of Tsar Saltan, composed in 1899–1900. The piece closes act 3, tableau 1, during which the magic Swan-Bird changes Prince Gvidon Saltanovich (the Tsar's son) into a bumblebee so that he can fly away to visit his father, who does not know that he is alive. The piece is one of the most recognizable in classical music. The fast pace of the music has given rise to its mass appeal, as well as making it difficult to play. Musicians have risen to the challenge by setting world records for the fastest performance on guitar, piano and violin.

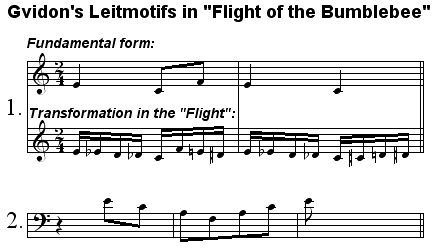
Two leitmotifs occur in the piece, a simple basic theme and the rapid buzzing motif of the bumblebee's flight. and

The Canadian violinist Eric Speed broke the record for the fastest performance of the "Flight of the Bumblebee" at the "Just For Laughs" festival in Montreal on 22 July 2011, playing the piece in 53 seconds. The song has a direct connection to martial arts master Bruce Lee, who starred on the radio program Green Hornet. "Flight" was the show's theme music, blended with a hornet buzz created on a theremin. The play upon which the opera was based – written by Alexander Pushkin – originally had two more insect themes: the Flight of the Mosquito and the Flight of the Fly. Neither was made into musical pieces. One was made into an illustration for the original publication.

Béla Bartók's bizarrely empathetic piece, "From the Diary of a Fly, for piano" (Mikrokosmos Vol. 6/142), attempts to depict the actions of a fly caught in a cobweb, from the fly's perspective—i.e., as related from his diary. The buzzing sounds signify the fly's desperation to escape. The middle section of the Adagio religioso movement in Bartók's 1945 Piano Concerto No. 3 contains imitations of natural sounds of insect and bird calls.

== In popular music ==
"Ants Marching" is a song by the Dave Matthews Band. The song features the theme of the monotony of everyday life being like ants marching endlessly to and fro. Both the theme and the music of the song are beloved by fans, being played over 1,000 times live in concert. Dave Matthews himself once declared, "This song is our anthem."

The Irish folk singer Sinéad Lohan included the song "Bee in the Bottle" on her 1995 album Who Do You Think I Am. Tucker Martine's 2005 album Broken Hearted Dragonflies: Insect Electronica from Southeast Asia arranges field recordings of insects as electronic music.

== Singing insects ==
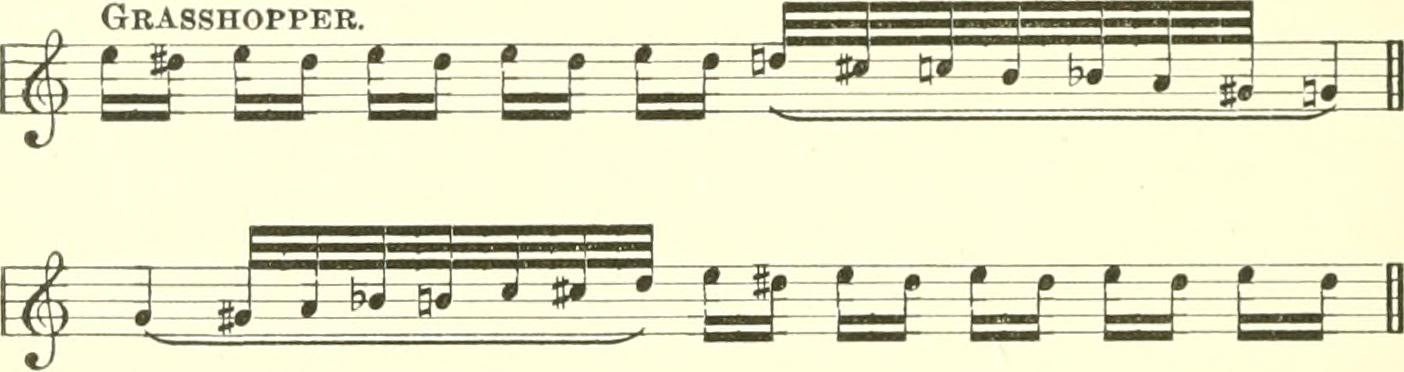
Grasshopper stridulation in musical notation in Simeon Pease Cheney's Wood Notes Wild, 1892 and

The jazz musician and philosophy professor David Rothenberg plays duets with singing insects including cicadas, crickets, and beetles.

The band Threehoppers used treehoppers and planthoppers recordings by the bioacoustics scholar Rex Cocroft to create an album.

== See also ==
- Birdsong in music
- Zoomusicology
