= Symphonic Distribution =

Worldwide music distributor

Symphonic
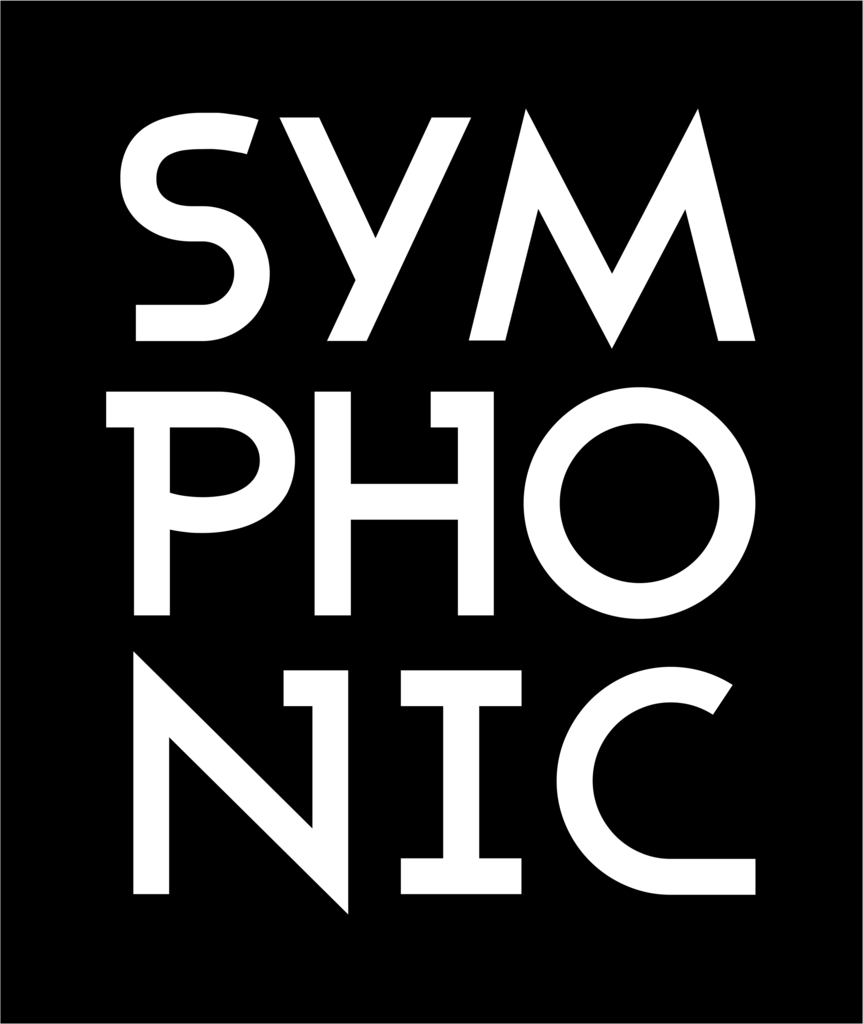
- Type: Private
- Industry: Music industry
- Genre: Digital distribution Music publishing
- Founded: 2006
- Founder: Jorge Brea
- Headquarters: Tampa, United States
- Area served: Worldwide
- Key people: Jorge Brea (Chairman and Chief Executive Officer)
- Services: On-demand music distribution
- Number of employees: 200
- Website: symphonic.com

Symphonic is an American music technology company founded by Jorge Brea in 2006 and headquartered in Tampa, Florida. The company provides music distribution services to independent record labels and artists, delivering releases to digital platforms such as Spotify, Apple Music, Amazon Music, Deezer, and Beatport. In 2017, Symphonic acquired Houseplanet Distribution. The company established a music licensing division in 2019.

== History and background ==
Symphonic is headquartered in Tampa, Florida, and was founded in late 2006. By 2010, the company had reported annual revenue exceeding $500,000. In 2014, it generated $2.3 million in revenue, with approximately $500,000 in profit.

In 2016, Symphonic opened an office in New York City to develop relationships with record labels, artists, and independent brands. Following the closure of Baseware Distribution, a distributor operated by Beatport, Symphonic took on more than 200 of its distribution accounts.

In 2017, Symphonic received a $4 million growth investment from Ballast Point Ventures, a Tampa-based private equity firm. The following year, the company appointed former Orchard executives Nick Gordon as chief client officer and general manager, and Eshan Shah Jahan as head of product. Both executives were based in New York.

Symphonic expanded its staff in 2017 and 2018. In June 2018, the company hired Jakub Alexander, a former employee of Ghostly International, as director of A&R and client development. The company also expanded its client marketing team, with a focus on Latin American, hip-hop and pop markets. Jon Mizrachi joined as senior director of sync licensing after spending 12 years at Carlin America, where he served as creative director for sync licensing in film, television and advertising.

In April 2018, Symphonic relocated its headquarters to a 4,000-square-foot office in downtown Tampa, Florida, in a building shared with Tampa Theatre. Later that year, the company partnered with the Tampa Downtown Partnership to create six Spotify playlists featuring local artists and highlighting different aspects of the Tampa Bay area.

In 2018, Symphonic opened an office in Nashville, Tennessee, led by Randall Foster, who served as vice president of business development. Foster previously worked at Naxos and Anthem Entertainment. The company later expanded its operations to Colombia, Brazil, Mexico, and other markets, as well as additional U.S. locations, including Los Angeles and Brooklyn. It also introduced services and tools for catalog management and transfers, royalty distribution through SplitPay, and analytics. According to a 2022 report, Symphonic had paid more than $100 million in artist royalties since its founding.

In January 2022, Symphonic announced a $37 million Series B funding round led by NewSpring and Ballast Point Ventures. The company subsequently acquired Streaming Promotions and expanded its services into Canada. Later that year, it introduced Symphonic Starter, a self-service music distribution plan that allows artists to upload unlimited songs for an annual fee while retaining 100% of their royalties.

=== Video Distribution ===
In July 2014, Symphonic introduced video distribution services. In 2018, the company partnered with Vevo to enable artists to distribute their music videos through the platform.

=== Acquisition of Houseplanet Distribution ===
In February 2017, Symphonic acquired Houseplanet Distribution, a Madrid-based music distributor specializing in house music.

=== Sync Licensing ===
In February 2019, Symphonic launched Bodega Sync, a division specializing in music licensing for film, television, advertising, and other media. Bodega Sync also operated as a standalone sync licensing agency.

=== Publishing Administration ===
In March 2019, Symphonic announced a partnership with Songtrust, a music publishing administration company.

== Partnerships ==
In 2021, Symphonic, UnitedMasters, and Horus Music partnered with the music funding company beatBread to offer clients more access to capital. beatBread's chordCashAI technology provides an automated advance experience for independent musicians while enabling clients to choose their own terms and retain ownership of their music.

In 2023, Symphonic became a founding member of the Music Fights Fraud Alliance, an international industry initiative established to address streaming fraud.

== Artists ==
=== Brazilian Artists ===
- Sabotage
- Dudu Nobre
- Elekfantz
- Samhara
- Scarlett Wolf

=== American Artists ===
- Citizen Cope
- Blackberry Smoke
- The Green
- Trisha Paytas
- I AM SOPHIA
- A$CEND!NG
- Under the Rug (band)

== See also ==
- TuneCore, a similar music distributor owned by Believe Music
- DistroKid, a similar independent music distributor
- Amuse, a similar music distributor
