= Horus Music =

Music distributor

- Type: Private
- Industry: Music
- Genre: Online distribution, Record label, Marketing
- Founded: 2006
- Founder: Nick Dunn
- Headquarters: Leicester, United Kingdom
- Area served: Worldwide
- Products: Record Label Services, Online Delivery (Music), Digital Marketing, Music Promotion,
- Services: Label Services, Music Distribution, Marketing, Radio Promotion, Music Publishing
- Number of employees: 17
- Website: horusmusic.global

Horus Music Limited is a global digital distribution and label services company. Established in 2006, Horus Music allows artists, labels and right-holders to send their music to over 200 download, streaming, and interactive platforms including iTunes, Google Play, Amazon, VEVO, 7digital, Spotify, Beatport, Deezer, Tidal, as well as offering digital marketing and playlisting opportunities.

== History ==
The company were named Best Business Partner of 2014 by Huawei Technology of China, and were also a finalist in the International Trade category as part of the Leicester Mercury Business Awards during that same year. Their client base consists of unsigned and independent musicians and record labels, as well as well known recording artists.

In November 2015, Horus Music sponsored the UK’s first Independent Label Week, in order to highlight the music that is released by the UK’s indie labels.

In 2016, Horus Music celebrated their 10th anniversary

Horus Music's sister companies Help for Bands and Help For Writers, provide advice and opportunities for musicians and E-book distribution for writers, respectively.

Anara Publishing opened in 2017 which allows the company to work closely with a handpicked roster of musicians to provide royalty administration and sync licensing services.

On 21 April 2017, Her Majesty Queen Elizabeth II’s 91st birthday, Horus Music was awarded with the Queen’s Award for Enterprise in International Trade.

In 2021, Horus Music, UnitedMasters, and Symphonic Distribution partnered with the music fintech company, beatBread, to offer clients access to more capital. beatBread's chordCashAI technology provides an automated experience for independent musicians while enabling clients to choose their own terms and retain ownership of their music.

== Clients ==
Horus Music has partnered with a number of charities including Save the Children, for the recording "Look into Your Heart", featuring Beverley Knight with Rolling Stones' Mick Jagger and Ronnie Wood, 100% of proceeds from the single were donated to the charity. The Pixel Project, who produced songs about violence against women and the blood cancer charity Bloodwise.

The company have spoken openly about the state of the music industry and artists' rights and were one of the first distributors to remove their catalogue from Rdio after the streaming service was acquired by Pandora. Their relationships with artists and labels, as well as leading industry contacts, means they have the ability to work with musicians in a myriad of ways, including offering performance opportunities and even local auditions for TV shows such as The Voice UK.

== Horus Music India ==
Horus Music India opened in 2016 and is based in Mumbai.

By opening Horus Music India, the company are able to expand on their local connections as well as to provide a much more personalised service to musicians based in this area. The appointment of two Business Development Managers in India cemented their move.
