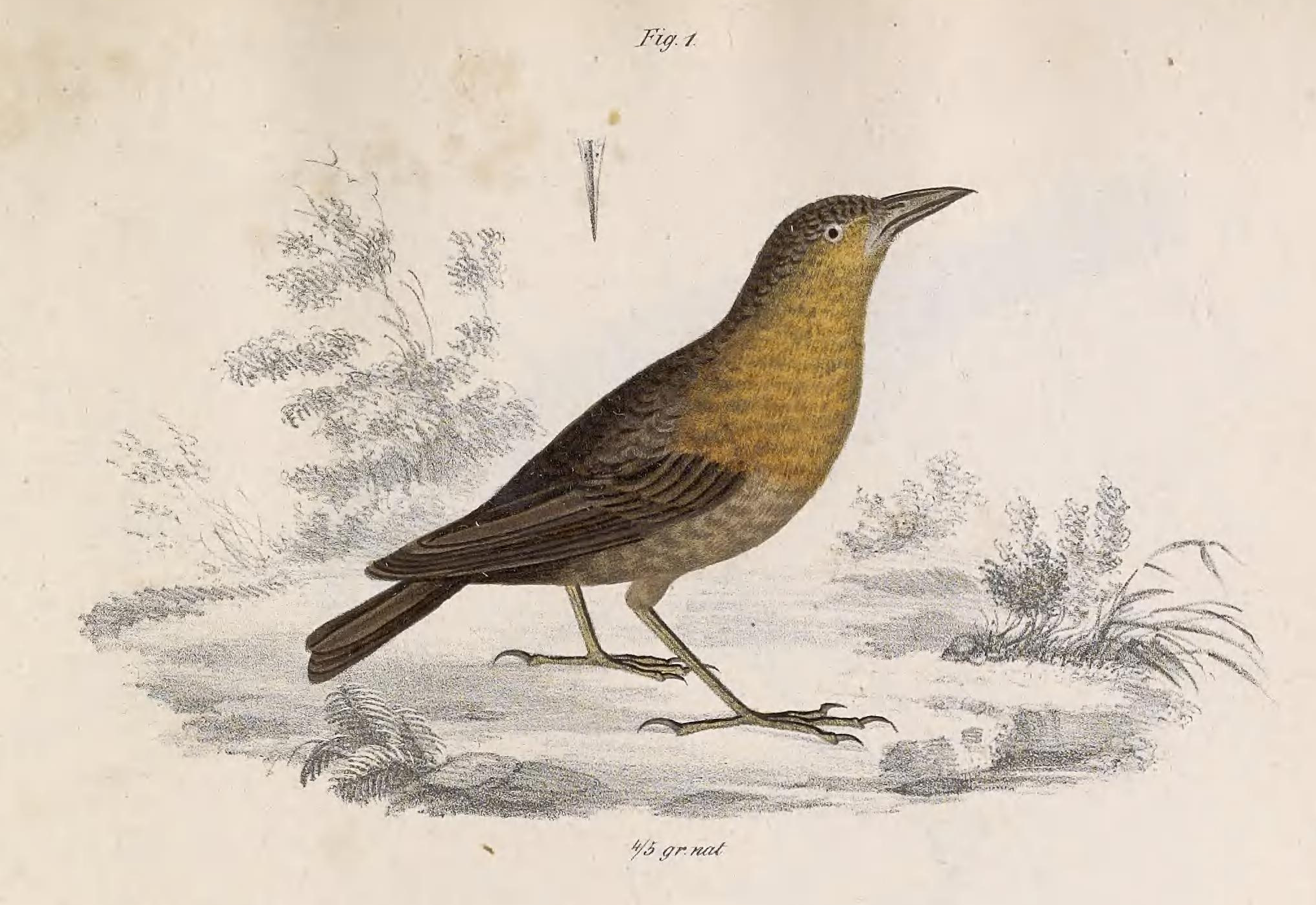

Conservation status
- Least Concern (IUCN 3.1)

Scientific classification
- Kingdom: Animalia
- Phylum: Chordata
- Class: Aves
- Order: Passeriformes
- Family: Troglodytidae
- Genus: Cyphorhinus
- Species: C. thoracicus

Binomial name
- Cyphorhinus thoracicus Tschudi, 1844

Synonyms
- Leucolepis thoracicus

= Southern chestnut-breasted wren =

Species of bird

The southern chestnut-breasted wren (Cyphorhinus thoracicus) is a species of passerine bird in the wren family Troglodytidae that is found in southern Peru and the extreme northwest of Bolivia. It was formerly considered to be conspecific with the northern chestnut-breasted wren (Cyphorhinus dichrous) with the English name "chestnut-breasted wren".

== Taxonomy ==
The southern chestnut-breasted wren was formally described in 1844 by the Swiss naturalist Johann Jakob von Tschudi based on a specimen collected in Peru. He coined the binomial name Cyphorhinus thoracicus where the specific epithet is Medieval Latin meaning "pectoral" or "of the chest". The southern chestnut-breasted wren was formerly treated as conspecific with the northern chestnut-breasted wren (Cyphorhinus dichrous) with the English name "chestnut-breasted wren". The two taxa are now split based on the significant vocal differences despite the minor difference in the color of the plumage.

== Description ==
The southern chestnut-breasted wren is 11.5 to 15 cm (4.5 to 5.9 in) long and weighs 26.5 to 41 g (0.93 to 1.45 oz). It has a sooty black crown, a rich dark brown back and rump, and a dark brown tail. It has a deep orange-brown face, throat, and upper belly and dark brown flanks and lower belly. The juvenile differs from the adult in having a paler lower belly.

== Distribution and habitat ==
The southern chestnut-breasted wren is found in central Peru and western Bolivia. It inhabits wet montane forest including cloud forest with abundant epiphytes and moss. It is mostly found between 1,200 and 2,700 m (3,900 and 8,900 ft) but down to 800 m (2,600 ft) in Peru's Manú Province.

== Behavior ==
=== Feeding ===
The chestnut-breasted wren typically remains within 1 m (3.3 ft) of the ground, foraging in leaf litter for invertebrates such as beetles and spiders. It hunts alone, in pairs, or in what are assumed to be small family groups. It only rarely joins mixed-species foraging flocks.

=== Breeding ===
Little is known about the chesnut-breasted wren's breeding phenology. Its nesting season appears to differ regionally; overall it is protracted. One nest in Peru has been photographed; it was a domed structure of mostly live material set very close to the ground. It contained two eggs.

=== Vocalization ===
The songs of the two chesnut-breasted wren subspecies differ significantly. That of the "southern" C. t. thoracicus is "a variable, musical and usually unhurried series...[of] fluted whistles that differ from each other in pitch, which are then followed by a faster-paced series of 5–11 short whistles...or by a much faster trilled tremolo." Its call is "a low, somewhat frog-like and wooden 'krol'". The song of C. t. dichrous is "a series of usually 3–4 ethereal, clear whistled notes" and its call "a harsh 'churr'".

== Status ==
The IUCN treats the southern chestnut-breasted wren as being of Least Concern. The species is quite common in parts of Colombia, scarce in Ecuador, uncommon to locally common in Peru, and rare to uncommon in Bolivia. It does occur in several protected areas.
