= Joe Belmont (bird impressionist) =

American bird impressionist and baritone

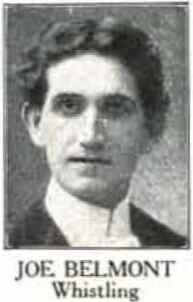
Belmont pictured from Edison Amberol promotional material

Joe Belmont was the stage name of Joseph Walter Fulton (July 22, 1876 – August 29, 1949) who was a whistling performer and baritone in the United States who came to be known as "The Human Bird". He was one of the most popular recording artists in the years leading up to 1900 and sang as a baritone and whistled for the Columbia Quartet along with Albert Campbell, Jim Reynard and Joe Majors. His top-selling records included "Beautiful Birds, Sing On", "Tell Me, Pretty Maiden" (with Byron G. Harlan, Frank C. Stanley, and the Florodora Girls, Columbia 31604, 1901).

== Biography ==
Joseph Walter Fulton was born in Shamokin, Pennsylvania on July 22, 1876. When Joseph was eight years old his family moved to Charles Town, West Virginia, and while there he studied the piano and became skilled in imitating birds through whistling. His talent was discovered in 1892 and he began performing at the theater. In 1894 he made his first recordings for the Columbia Phonograph Company, by which time he began using his professional name. He would later also record for Edison Records and at least forty other phonograph firms. By 1900 he was one of the most popular recording artists. He became a top theater draw, appearing not only across the United States but also in Europe, Australia, and even Fiji. He made several recordings for European companies while on a 1908 tour there, including a remarkable session for Germany's Favorite Records that resulted in ten issued sides. Dental problems led to his retirement from whistling after which he performed for the Ziegfeld Follies in the 1920s with the "Belmont Canary Opera" show consisting of trained singing and talking birds where he was assisted by Virginia, a dancer who later married his son Walter Joseph. Belmont also started a birds-only pet shop in Radio City named the Belmont Bird and Kennel Shop, assisted by his son Walter and daughter-in-law Virginia. Belmont's last recording was made in 1929 for Columbia, the company he started with, in a recording featuring his canaries. Joe Belmont died on August 28, 1949. Virginia Belmont did shows and recordings with trained singing and talking birds on her own and ran the store until the early 1980s.

Belmont's most popular recordings as a solo artist were "Listen to the Mockingbird" and his own composition, "Beautiful Birds, Sing On." According to Joel Whitburn, Belmont's best-selling record was "Tell Me Pretty Maiden" in an ensemble with Byron G. Harlan, Frank C. Stanley and "The Floradora Girls" in a 1901 recording for Columbia.

Belmont sang in addition to his whistling. He sang the baritone part in the first recordings of the "Columbia Quartette". Belmont claimed to have "discovered" Henry Burr by bringing him to the attention of Columbia recording engineer George Emerson.

== Recorded compositions ==
- The Blacksmith and the Bird
- The Blue Jay and the Thrush
- Beautiful Birds, Sing On
- Gentle Spring Is Here Again
- How Birds Make Love
- The Merry Farmer Boys
- The Nightingale
- On an Afternoon in June
- The Songs of the Nations
- Whistle While You Walk
- The Whistling Coquette
