= Charles Crawford Gorst =

American educator, ornithologist and bird imitator

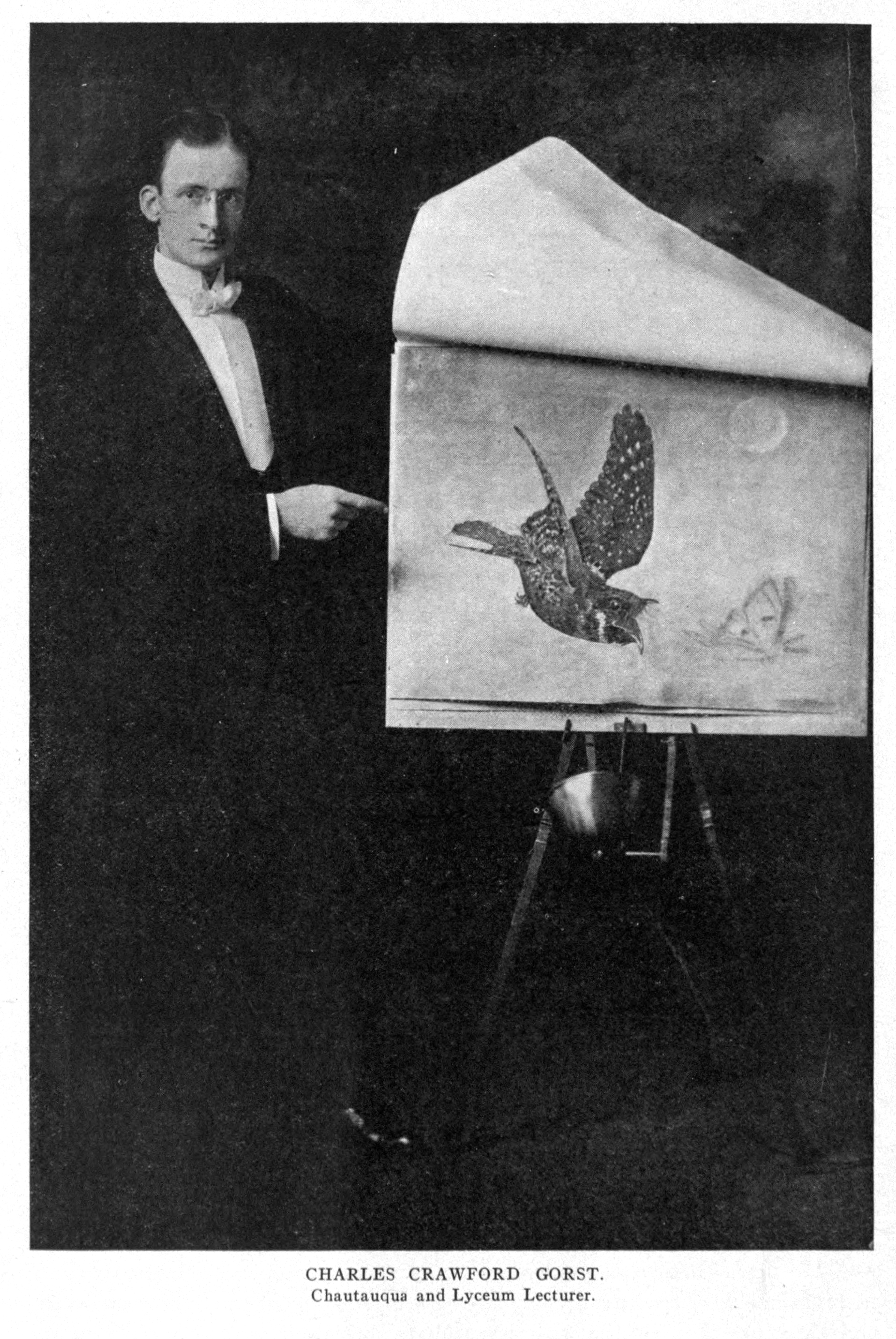
Gorst showing his charts in a performance (1917)

Charles Crawford Gorst (1885 - 1956) was an American performer, educator and a noted bird-call imitator. He called himself "The Bird Man" and travelled across the United States, giving talks to bird clubs, church gatherings, the Chautauqua assemblies, and at educational institutions from around 1915 to around 1924. His talks included his own paintings of birds made on large charts, entertaining anecdotes and whistled bird imitations. He claimed to be able to imitate more than 250 birds and he also made musical compositions that included his bird imitations.

Little is known of Gorst's early life but he was born in Omaha, Nebraska to Reverend William Gorst (of the Methodist church) and Agnes Campbell Crawford. He received a Bachelor of Arts in 1908 studying English and Philosophy at the Nebraska Wesleyan University and received a Bachelor of Sacred Theology from Boston in 1911. He also served as a laboratory assistant in ornithology at the Nebraska Wesleyan University. He married Grace Dishong in 1908. He was awarded the 1936 John Burroughs Medal for his "unusual art of interpreting bird songs". Around the same time the technology for recording bird song in the field improved making whistled imitations, often of doubtful accuracy, less popular. His own promotional brochure claimed that he frequently spoke at the American Museum of Natural History. He claimed that his use of large paintings held before flood lighting was more effective than lantern slides. He made numerous claims that he could strike up a chorus of birds in silent woods by his imitations, that he had imitated a young bird which led the mother to bring him a worm and that migrating birds called out to him. In 1917 the American Ornithologists' Union elected Gorst as an associate. In 1922 he promoted the protection of bobwhite quail in Mississippi claiming that it helped control boll weevils.

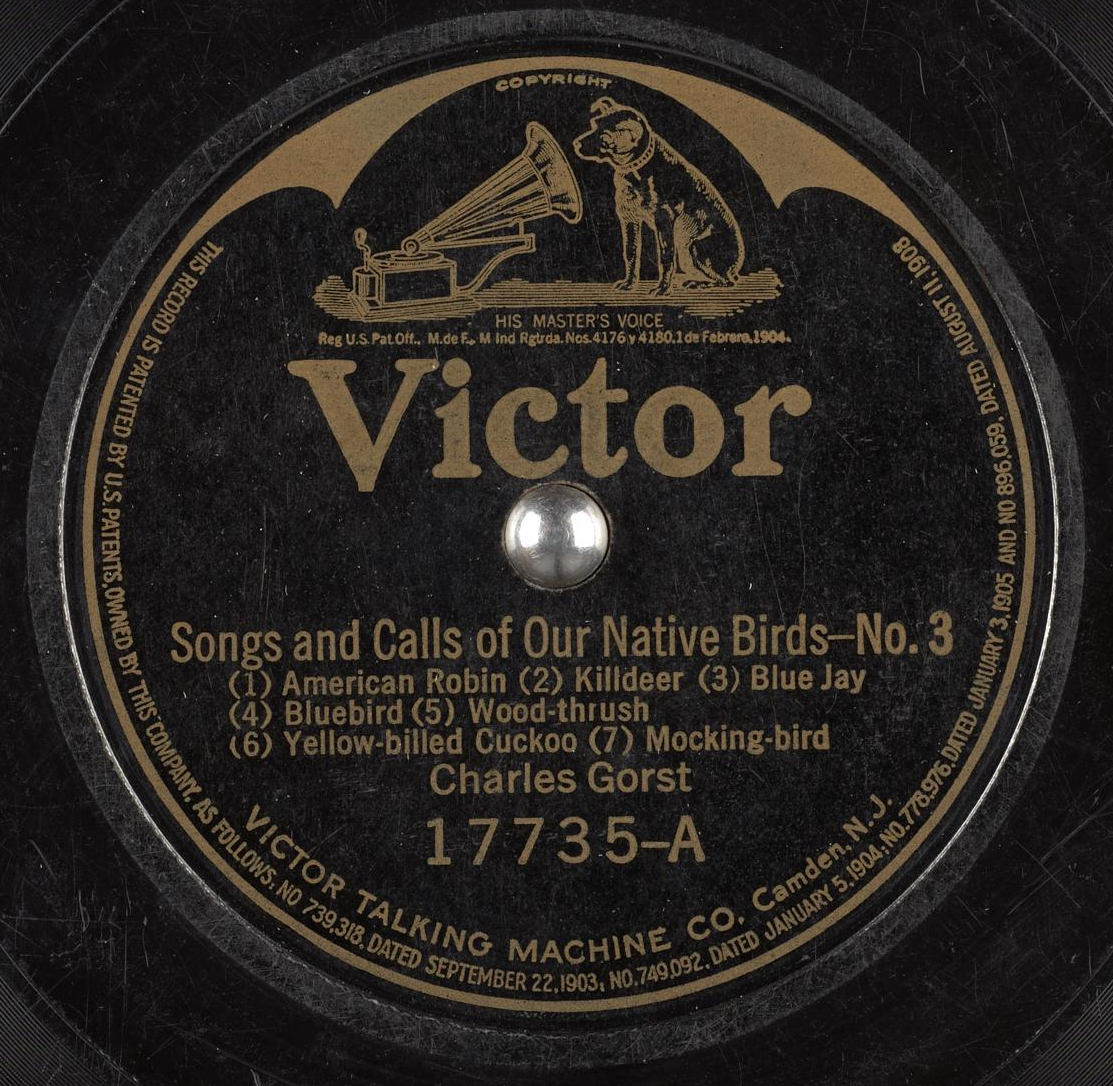
A Victor record, part of a series by Gorst (1915)

His claims were poetically rendered on stage to large audiences who bought tickets at 75 cents a person:

In silent woods I have sung and started a general chorus. The Brown Thrasher has flown to me for a singing contest. The hawk has answered my scream and swooped at me. I have called a maiden Redstart away from her lover and brought him in anger after her. Like a baby Song Sparrow I cried for food; its fidgety mother brought me a green worm! On a solitary Canadian lake my imitative laughter decoyed a pair of swimming grebes to me through the reeds. I have stood in the dusk of a giant redwood forest and called the Varied Thrush down a long pillar of light from the wood's high roof. In Florida when I mocked a Mockingbird I brought upon him an undeserving beating from another! ... In the cool twilight of northern woods I have stood beside vine-wound columns under high green arches and sung heavenly evening hymns with Hermit Thrushes. From a high cliff, on a black autumn night, I have called up to migrating birds and heard a circling voice come down and murmur, "Are you there? Come with us!" And I have longed to go.
