= Charles Kellogg (naturalist) =

American naturalist and vaudeville performer (1868–1949)

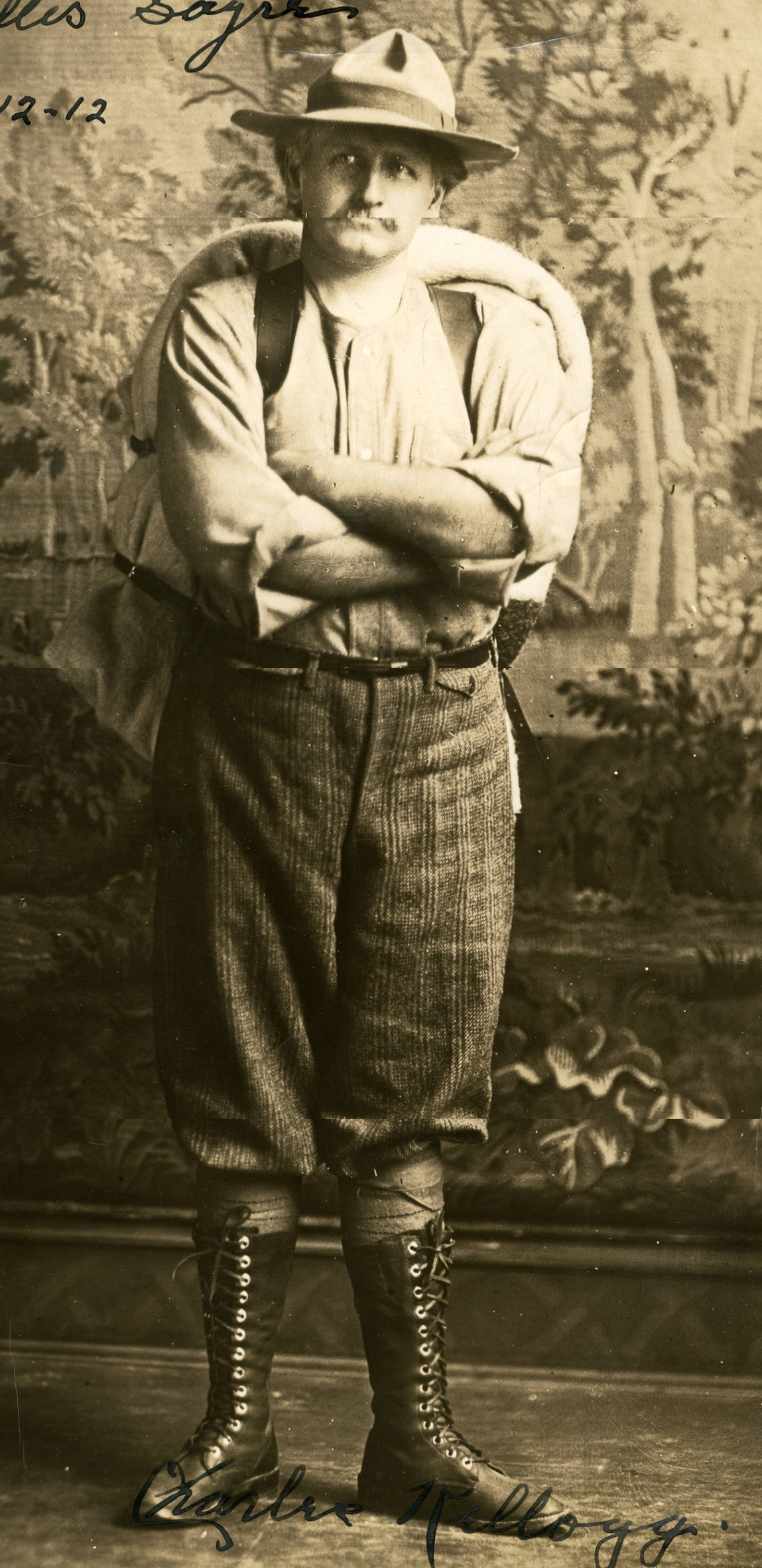
- Charles Kellogg c. 1912 as a vaudeville performer

Signature
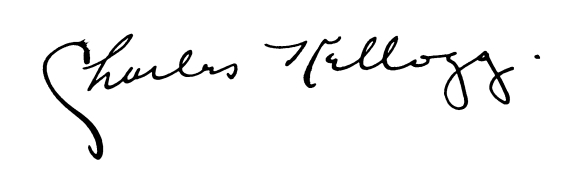

Charles Kellogg (October 2, 1868 – September 5, 1949) was an American vaudeville performer who imitated bird songs, and later a campaigner for the protection of the redwood forests of California. He was born on a ranch in Susanville, California and grew up in the 1870s observing the animals and birds of the forests and learning outdoor skills. He constructed a mobile home, called the "Travel Log", out of a redwood tree and drove it around the country to raise awareness of the plight of the California forests. Its maximum speed was 18 mph. The Travel Log itself is currently on display in the Visitor Center at Humboldt Redwoods State Park.

Pat Foster of Hemmings Classic Car magazine wrote "the vehicle itself was incredible, a monument to man and nature. It consisted of a huge chunk of giant redwood-said to be the single largest piece of hewn timber in the world-hollowed out and mounted on what was then the toughest, most rugged chassis on earth: the Nash Quad."

== Early life ==
Kellog grew up without his mother in the High Sierras where his father Henry Kellogg and Richard Thompson had discovered Gopher Hill Gravel Mine. His father had been born in Cazenovia, New York and after moving west and settling in the Sierras near Quincy, California, ran a store that catered to prospectors. With his father busy, he was raised at his home, Spanish Ranch, by a Native American nanny and a Chinese cook named Moon. He wrote in his autobiography that they "taught me to fear no creature... the habit of minding my own business, letting the other fellow alone - bird, bear, snake, Indian and other humans." Kellogg started impersonating birds really young, being able to imitate most bird sounds at around 16.

He was sent off to study at Cazenovia Seminary in Syracuse, New York where he lived with his father's sister and he developed his talent for imitating bird songs. At the age of 16 he joined a touring group and later Benjamin Franklin Keith's Vaudeville franchise performing as "the nature singer" and in musical acts.

== Career and later life ==
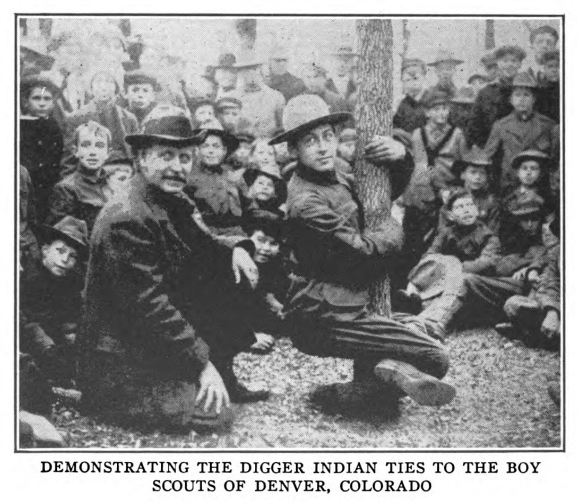
In a demonstration to boy scouts, Kellogg locks a volunteer's legs around a tree to show a supposed punishment used by the local Indigenous people. The "Digger Indians" noted in this clipping was a non-specific racial stereotype used by white people.

During his childhood Kellogg developed the remarkable ability to perfectly imitate bird song. While bird song imitation was quite popular at the turn of the century, Kellogg's ability to sing from the throat instead of whistle the songs, was what gained him such national attention. By the time he was 22 he was performing his bird songs on vaudeville tours around the country. By the time he was in his forties he was traveling outside of the United States, performing for audiences throughout Europe. Kellogg claimed that he had a 12½-octave, almost twice the range of a piano.

In 1911 Victor Records signed Kellogg to his first recording contract. He recorded with Victor Records until 1926, mostly singing classical and light classical pieces. Kellogg often performed an adaptation of Xaver Scharwenka's Polish Dance No. 1 in E-Flat Minor, Op. 3, a popular piece for vaudeville actors to perform at that time.

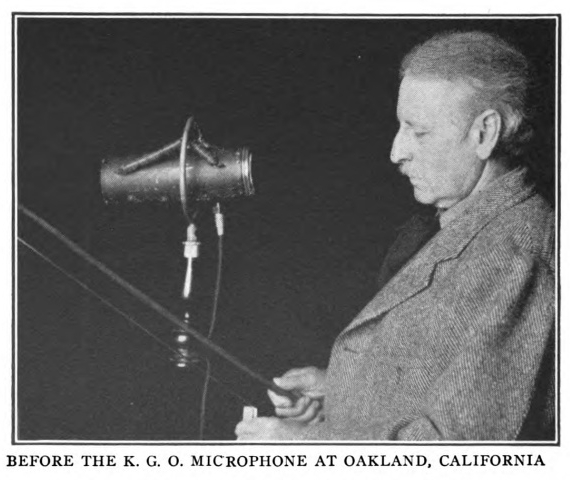
Kellogg at a recording studio in Oakland

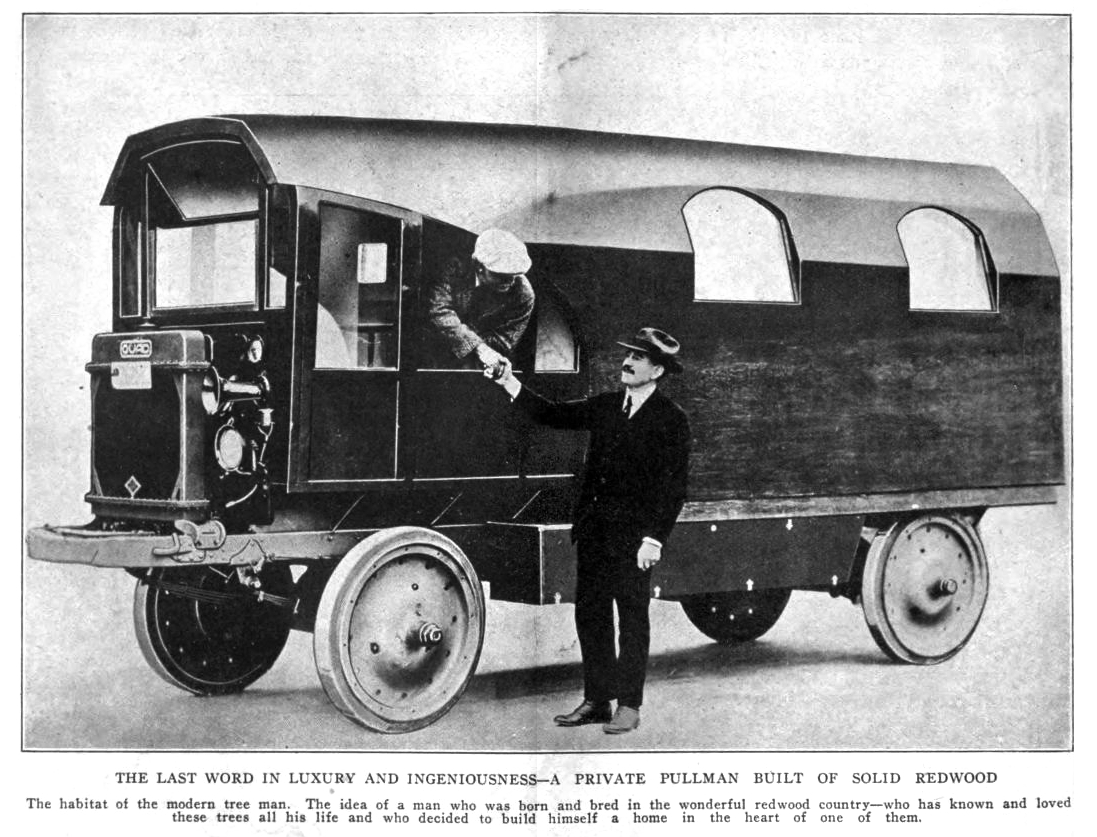
The Travel Log made from a single piece of redwood weighing 3 tons mounted on a Nash Quad

Kellogg proclaimed his love for the Californian wilderness while traveling in his carved redwood log home. He also claimed to be a vegetarian who chose not to own a gun and his outdoor skills included the ability to start a fire with a wooden drill.

After discovering an 1867 treatise by John Tyndall that a small and regulated flame could be extinguished by a sound of the appropriate frequency, he claimed to have developed the technique to do this with his voice. He was also a skilled craftsman and an inventor. In 1924 he designed and patented a mechanized fruit and nut picker. He also designed a movable fireplace. Every time he visited his California home, he found that the forests were dwindling and along with his friends who included John Muir and John Burroughs he considered ways to highlight the loss. He "kept thinking and thinking through many years how to take the forest out to the world ...[since] the world could not come out to the forests". After World War I he saw a powerful truck, a Nash Quad and decided to modify it by adding a body made from a 7 metre section of a redwood and carving it out with a bed, a toilet and a kitchen with cupboards. The wood weighed 3 tons and could not be lifted. He then dug a tunnel under the wood and drove the Nash Quad under it and then had the log body lowered onto it. He called his vehicle the "Travel Log" and drove it around at a maximum speed of about 8 km/hour. In later years he traveled in a lighter vehicle that he called the "Bird Wing" - something that he claimed would start when he whistled to it. He traveled at various times to the West Indies and Fiji where he observed a fire-walking ceremony. He also traveled to Paris where he met Auguste Rodin.

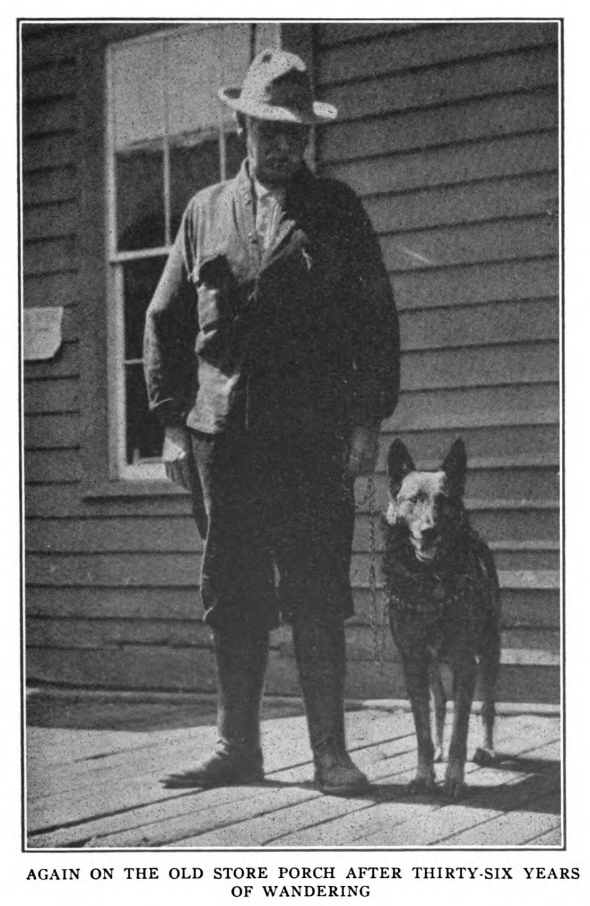
Kellogg at his childhood home

Kellogg later moved to live in a carved wooden cabin, The Mushroom, in a place he called Ever Ever Land. The cabin included all the amenities built to merge into the surrounding wilderness. He was taken care in later life by two of his sisters. They used his Travel Log as a sewing room and donated it in 1994 to the Humboldt Redwood Interpretive Association. Kellogg wrote an autobiographical book Charles Kellogg, the nature singer, his book (1929).

== In media ==
In 2003, NPR's Ketzel Levine focused on Kellogg in the first part of her three part radio story Big Trees and the Lives They've Changed.

In 2007 a musical play entitled An Angel for Ever Ever written and composed by Kim Moreno, was created in tribute to Kellogg's life and accomplishments. Named after his California ranch, the Ever Ever Ranch, it is centered on his relationship with his wife Sara Fuller Burchard ("Sa'Di"), and the wealthy daughter of Eastman Kodak president Henry A. Strong named Gertrude Strong Achilles who was married to Theodore Carter Achilles.

In Episode 76 of MythBusters, "Voice Flame Extinguisher," Kellogg was mentioned by name several times as his claim that he could extinguish a flame with only his voice was tested. The myth was busted. In The Sydney Morning Herald, Thursday, February 4, 1926 the following article appeared: Sound Vibration. Extinguishes Fire. New York, Feb. 2.: Mr Charles Kellogg, a Californian scientist, give firemen here a demonstration of extinguishing a gas flame two feet high by tonal vibration. Mr Kellogg passed a bow, like an enlarged violin bow, swiftly across an aluminium tuning fork, producing a screech like an intense radio static. Instantly the yellow flame subsided to six inches and became a sputtering blue flare. Another movement of the bow completely extinguished the flame. Mr Kellogg claimed that in future buildings would have a scientifically-determined pitch, with a screech for extinguishing fires tuned in from a central firehouse, where it would be produced by a much larger bow. He said that the General Electric Company was experimenting with the matter.

== Cited references ==
- Kellogg, Charles (1929). Charles Kellogg, the nature singer, his book. California: Morgan Hill.
