= Climate change and birds =

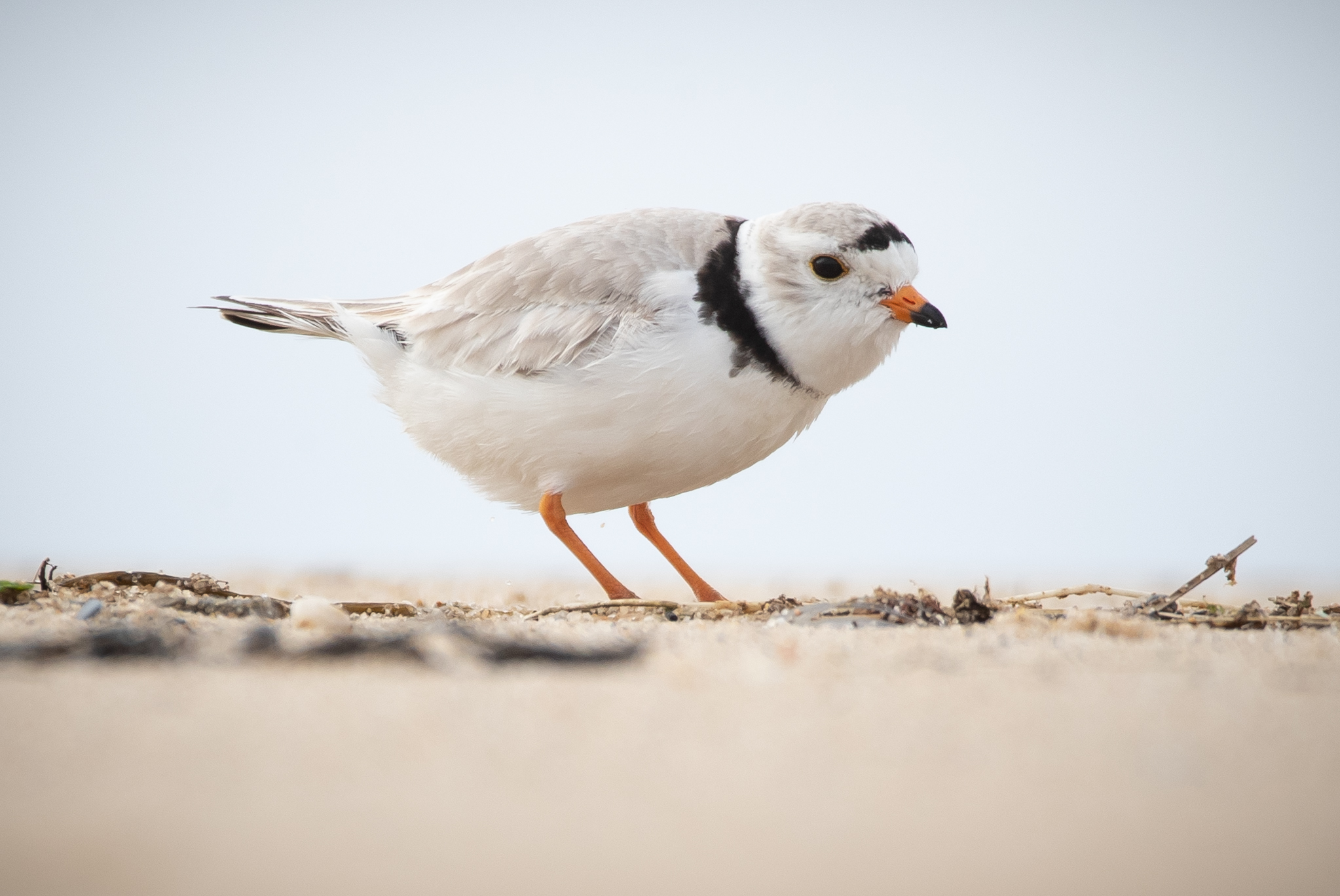
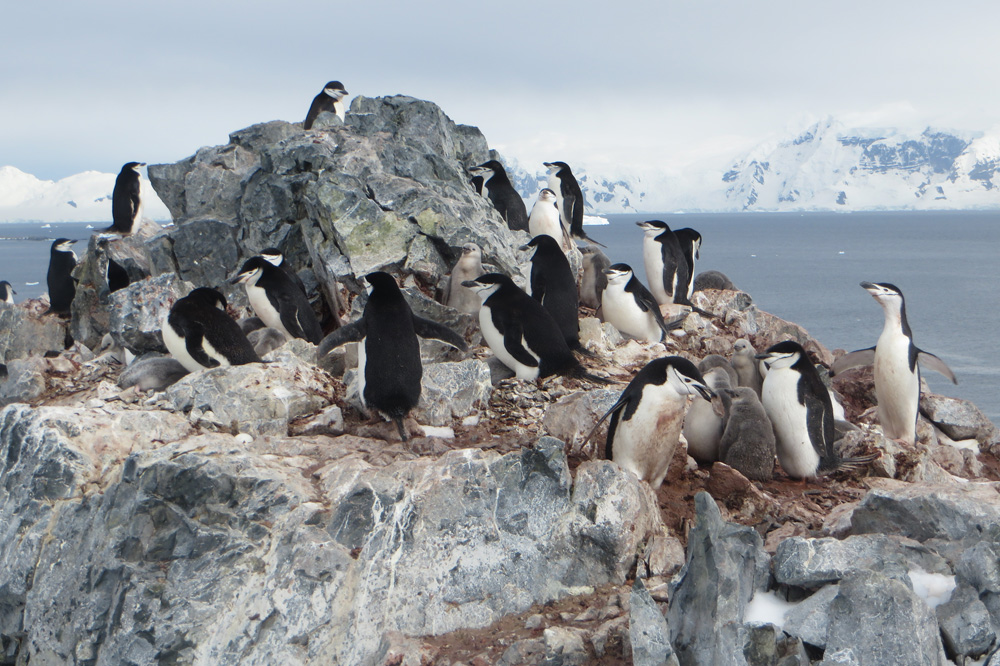
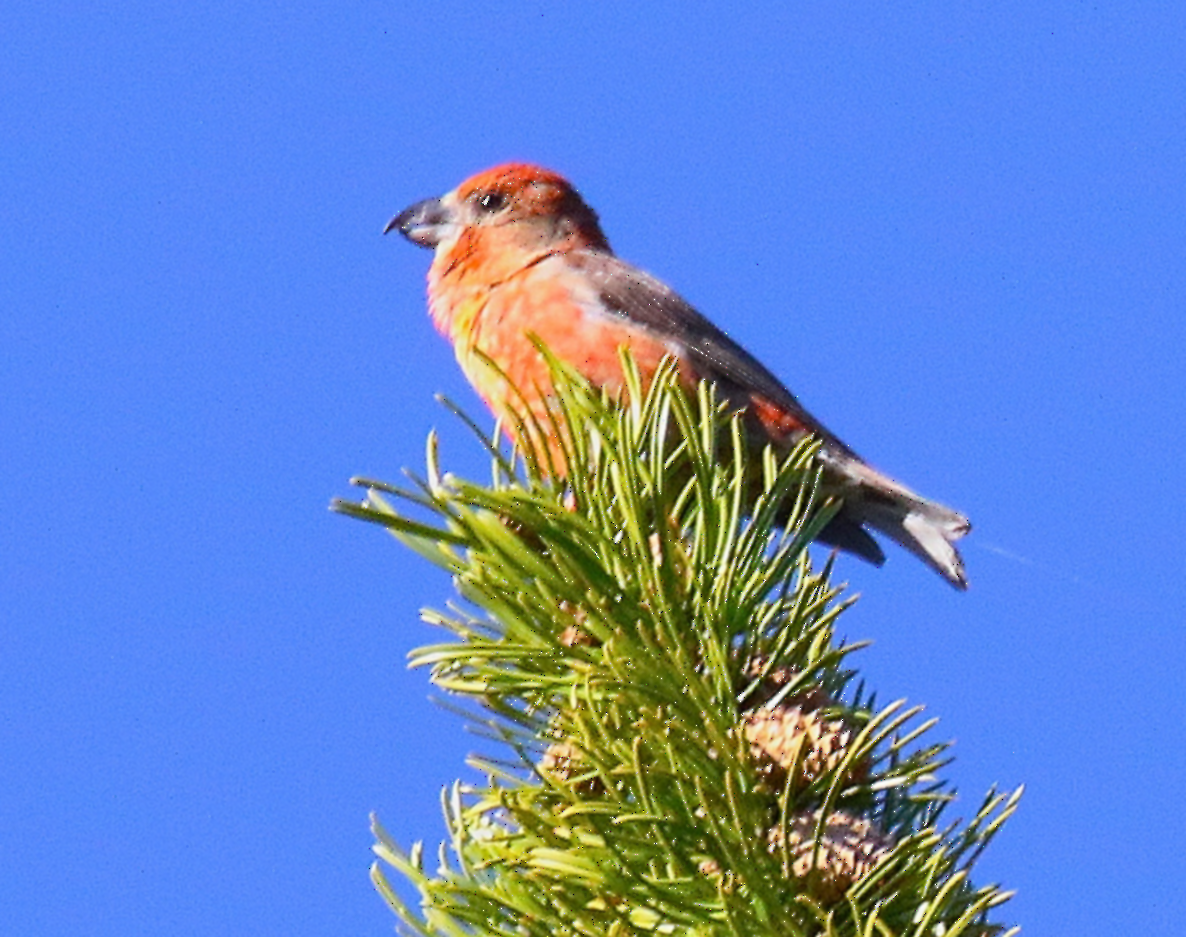
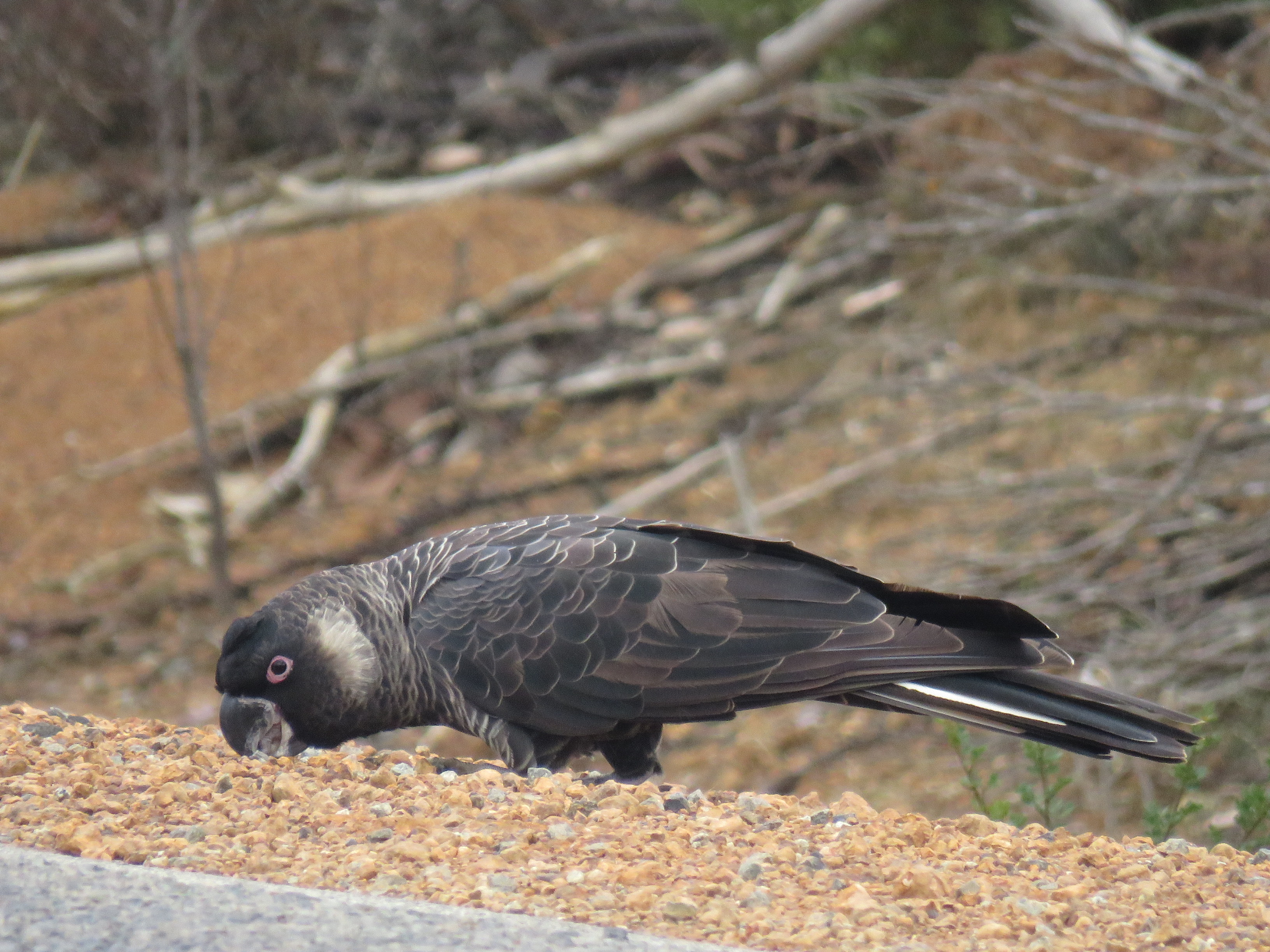
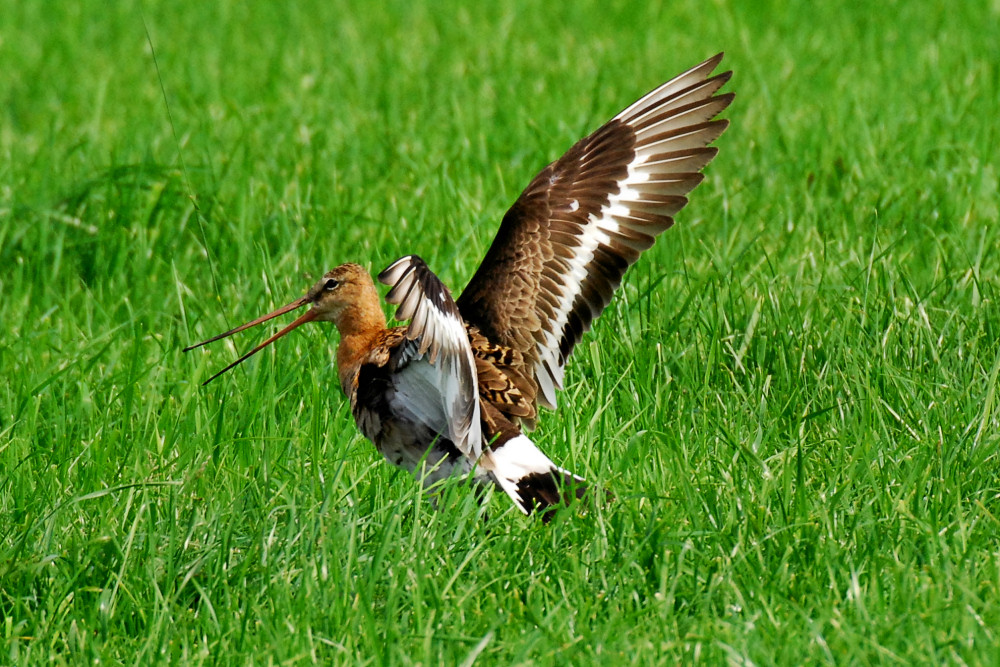
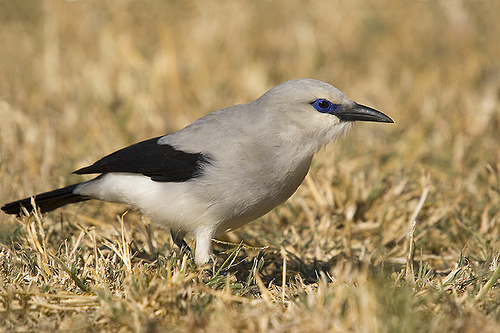
Some of the bird species known to have already experienced substantial impacts of climate change. Clockwise from the left: piping plover, chinstrap penguins, Cassia Crossbill, Carnaby's Black Cockatoo, Black-tailed godwit, and Ethiopian Bush-crow.

Significant work has gone into analyzing the effects of climate change on birds. Like other animal groups, birds are affected by anthropogenic (human-caused) climate change. The research includes tracking the changes in species' life cycles over decades in response to the changing world, evaluating the role of differing evolutionary pressures and even comparing museum specimens with modern birds to track changes in appearance and body structure. Predictions of range shifts caused by the direct and indirect impacts of climate change on bird species are among the most important, as they are crucial for informing animal conservation work, required to minimize extinction risk from climate change.

Climate change mitigation options can also have varying impacts on birds. However, even the environmental impact of wind power is estimated to be much less threatening to birds than the continuing effects of climate change.

== Causes ==
Climate change has raised the temperature of the Earth by about 1.1 °C (2.0 °F) since the Industrial Revolution. As the extent of future greenhouse gas emissions and mitigation actions determines the climate change scenario taken, warming may increase from present levels by less than 0.4 °C (0.72 °F) with rapid and comprehensive mitigation (the 1.5 °C (2.7 °F) Paris Agreement goal) to around 3.5 °C (6.3 °F) (4.5 °C (8.1 °F) from the preindustrial) by the end of the century with very high and continually increasing greenhouse gas emissions.

== Effects ==
=== Physical changes ===
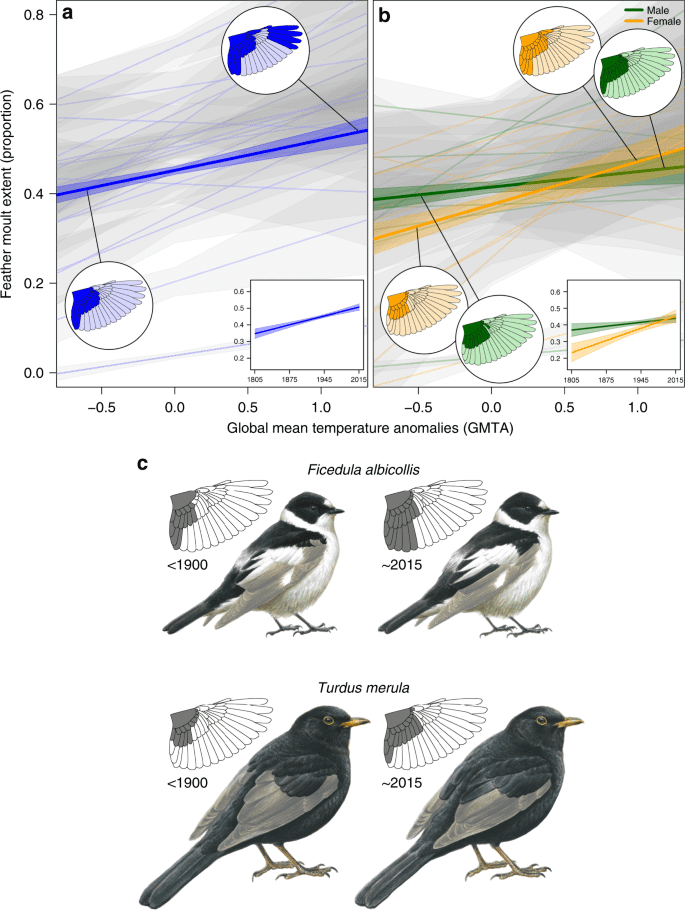
Museum specimens of Collared flycatcher (top) and Eurasian blackbird (bottom) juveniles compared with modern-day birds. Nesting feathers are replaced with adult plumage earlier, and females now complete the shift earlier than males, while in the past it was the opposite.

Birds are a group of warm-blooded vertebrates constituting the class Aves, characterized by feathers, toothless beaked jaws, the laying of hard-shelled eggs, a high metabolic rate, a four-chambered heart, and a strong yet lightweight skeleton.

Climate change has already altered the appearance of some birds by facilitating changes to their feathers. A comparison of museum specimens of juvenile passerines from 1800s with juveniles of the same species today had shown that these birds now complete the switch from their nesting feathers to adult feathers earlier in their lifecycle, and that females now do this earlier than males. Further, blue tits are defined by blue and yellow feathers, but a study in Mediterranean France had shown that those contrasting colors became less bright and intense in just the period between 2005 and 2019.

A study in Chicago showed that the length of birds' lower leg bones (an indicator of body sizes) shortened by an average of 2.4% and their wings lengthened by 1.3%. In the central Amazon area, birds have decreased in mass (an indicator of size) by up to 2% per decade, and increased in wing length by up to 1% per decade, with links to temperature and precipitation shifts. These morphological trends may demonstrate an example of evolutionary change following Bergmann's rule. Across Eurasia, snowfinches became both smaller and darker over the past 100 years.

Rising temperatures due to global warming have also been shown to decrease the size of many migratory birds. In a first study to identify a direct link between cognition and phenotypic responses to climate change, researchers show that size reduction is much more pronounced in smaller-brained birds compared to bigger-brained species. Reduction in body size is a general response to warming temperatures since birds with smaller bodies can dissipate heat easier, helping to cope with the heat-caused stress. Reduced body and brain sizes also lead to reduced cognitive and competitive ability, making the smaller-species birds easier targets for predators. In another study where researchers compared the brain sizes of 1,176 bird species, they found that species that spend more resources on their young have larger brains as adults. Bird species that feed their offspring after hatching have extended durations during which their young can develop their brain, producing more intelligent and larger-brained offspring. Changing environments due to climate change might impact the ability of birds to obtain enough food to sustain their own brains and provide for their young, resulting in reduced brain sizes. Larger-brained and more intelligent birds, such as the New Caledonian crow, may therefore be able to better cope with the challenges posed by climate change.

=== Phenology ===
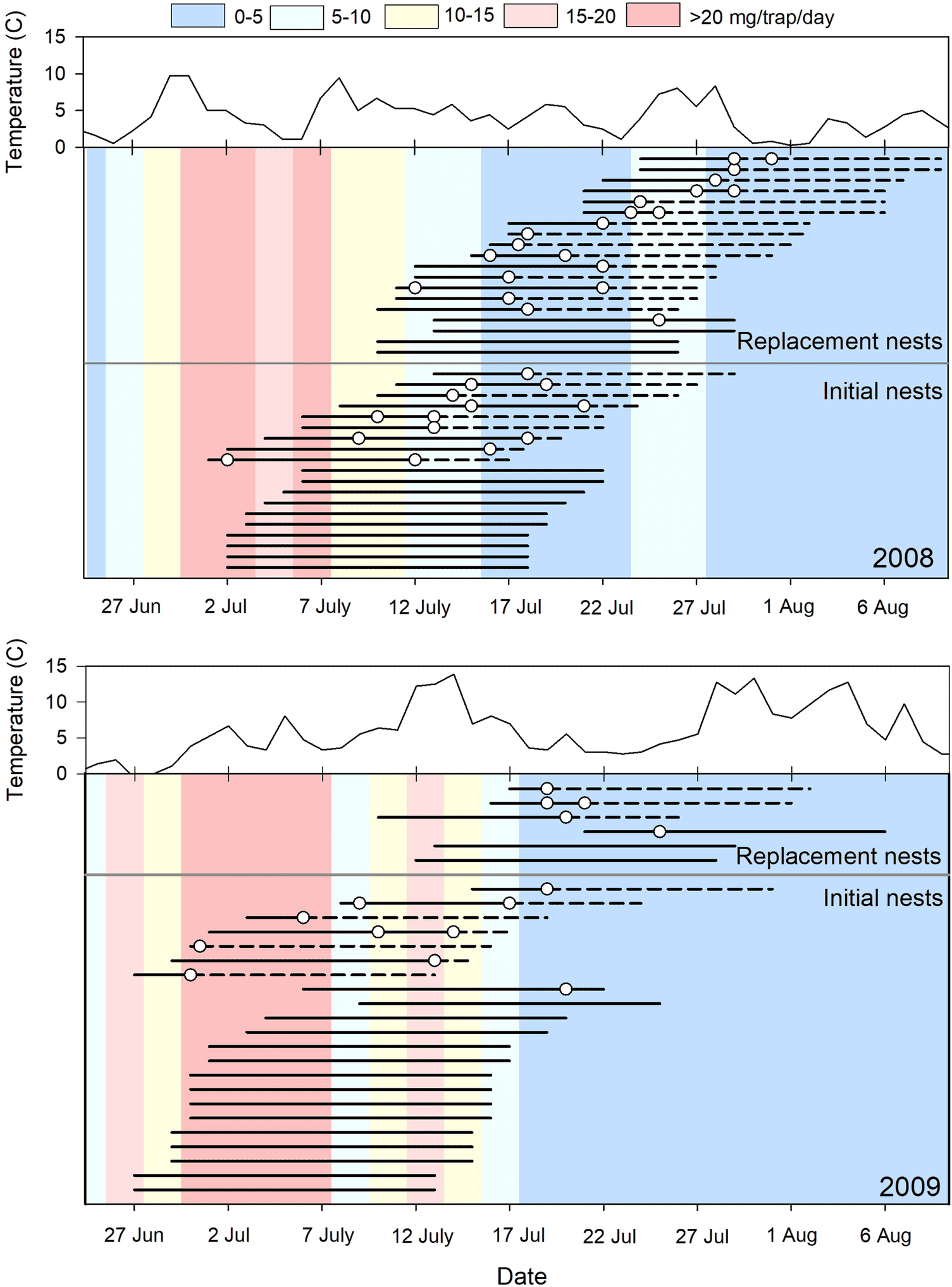
Differences in an Arctic shorebird phenology between a normal and a hotter year.

For many species, climate change already results in phenological mismatch, which is a phenomenon where the timing of one aspect of a species' yearly cycle ceases to align with another, impairing the species' evolutionary fitness. Events such as reproduction and migration are energetically expensive, and often only occur during a brief period throughout the annual cycle when seasonal prey availability is the highest. However, many prey items differ in energetic and nutritional content and are responding to climate change at different rates than bird life stages. Some common species like pied flycatcher can compensate for a mismatch between their breeding time and population sizes of their preferred prey (caterpillars) by feeding their offspring alternatives like flying insects and spiders, leading to reduced body mass but avoiding a major decrease in reproductive success. Mismatch is a more acute issue for Arctic shorebirds due to the high rate of climate change in the Arctic, leading to events like the 2016 starvation-caused die-off of around 9000 puffins and other shorebirds in Alaska. Long-distance migrating birds also tend to be more sensitive to phenological mismatch, due to the increasing inability to track changes in the breeding environment the further they migrate or to adjust when they can gather food and breed. There is more phenological mismatch occurring during the spring migration, leading to decline in populations in species that have a greater mismatch or phenological asynchrony, compared to species with a lower sensitivity to the changing climate and therefore less need to adjust migratory patterns. If the timing of the highest availability of a bird species' main food source happens earlier than its migration timeline because of warmer weather, then it will likely miss the time for resource gathering.

In response, changes in bird phenology have been observed over the past 50 years, such as the lengthening of spring migrations. Different species can have different triggers for migration, and so the changes in migration patterns can also differ, but for many, there is a correlation between temperatures and otherwise unexplained variations in migration timing over the short term. In general, the earliest individuals are migrating earlier and the latest migrating at a similar time or later than before. Wood warblers in North America provide a notable example, as an analysis of 60 years of data shows that every additional of early spring temperatures appears to bring their migrations 0.65 days closer. There has been some scientific debate as to whether such shifts represent an evolutionary adaptive change, or phenotypic plasticity. In other words, just because many individuals in a species have altered their phenology, it does not mean that the change will necessarily help those individuals obtain greater reproductive success and perpetuate the change in behaviour in the next generation, since individual phenotypic changes may be mistimed. This is especially important with climate change, as its variable rate makes it harder to adjust the timing correctly, and it's possible for individuals across multiple generations to respond to such environmental cues in the same manner, but without an ultimate reproductive benefit. Some species which have increased their egg laying dates and advanced spring migration timelines have shown more positive population trends, like some passerines breeding in Great Britain, but this only provides indirect evidence. To date, Common terns are one of a few species where the pressure to migrate earlier (forwards shift of 9.3 days over 27 years) was confirmed to have a heritable component to it.

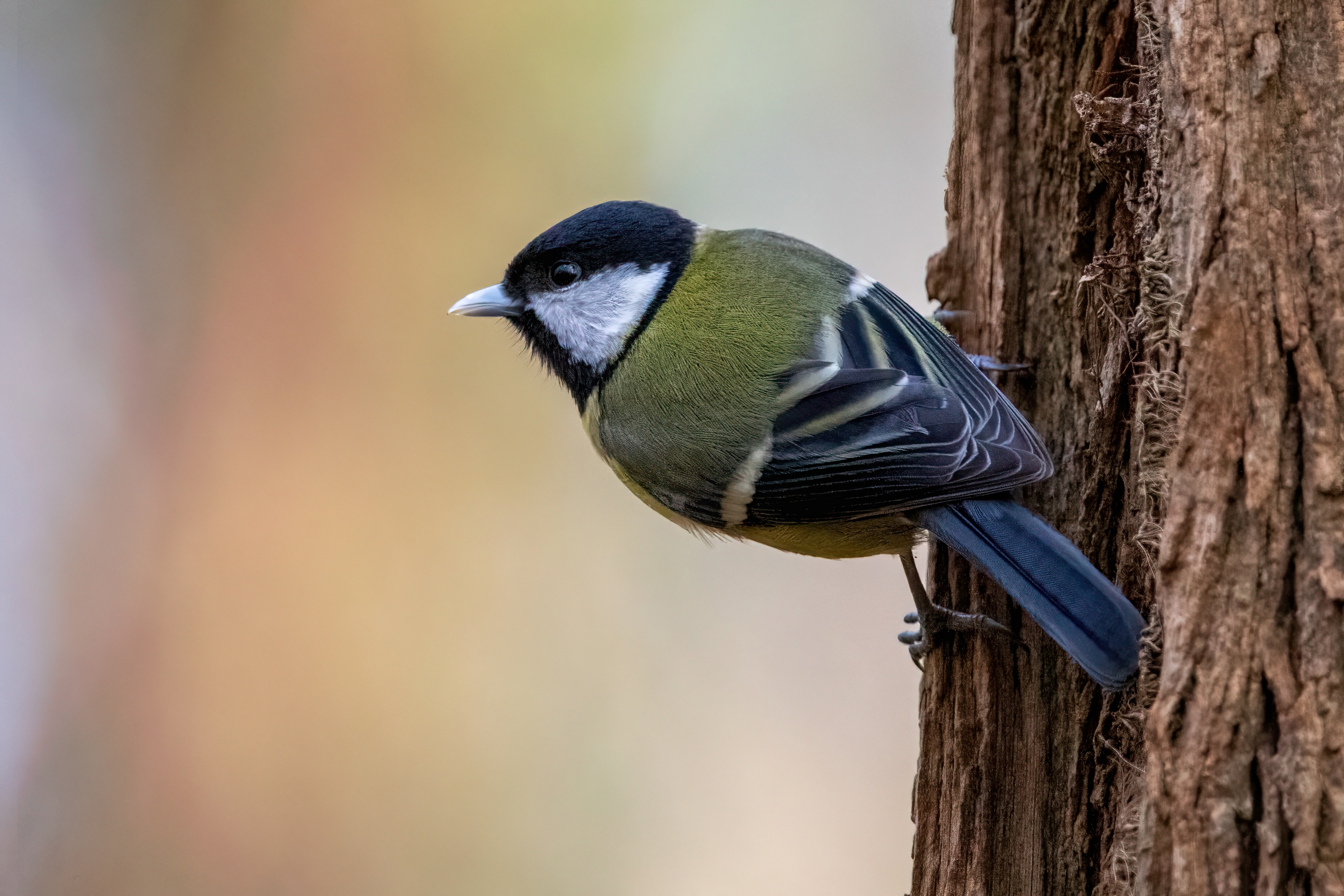
A great tit individual.

Great tits provide a notable example of the complexities of tracking phenology change. In 2006, population declines were observed due to a >10-day mismatch between their preferred breeding season and peak population spawn of caterpillars, their preferred food source. Consequently, fledglings raised earlier in the season when caterpillar populations are at their peak are in better physiological condition than those raised later in the breeding season, which should act as an evolutionary driver. Yet, caterpillar numbers are affected by more than the climate, with the physical condition of local primary producers like oak trees often being more important for their numbers, and consequently, for when it makes the most sense for great tit individuals to lay their eggs. Nevertheless, by 2021, it was observed that great tit phenology continued to advance even as the late spring warming, and thus the peak of caterpillar numbers, changed much less since 2006. Thus, phenological mismatch for great tits is now substantially lower than before, signifying successful adaptation, but future warming is likely to increase the mismatch again. If the Paris Agreement is fulfilled and the warming peaks at 1.5 °C (2.7 °F) or 2 °C (3.6 °F), then the mismatch will peak around 2050 and then decline again as the species will continue to adapt. Under RCP4.5 and RCP8.5, the two more severe climate change scenarios, average phenological mismatch will once again be at 10 days by the end of the century or even reach the near-unprecedented 15 days, respectively.

=== Extreme disturbance events ===
Projections of extreme weather under different levels of global warming.

Besides an ongoing increase in temperature and shifts in precipitation patterns, climate change also increases the frequency of extreme weather events, and those can be particularly damaging to species caught in their path. Carnaby's Black Cockatoo is a species in southwestern Australia which suffered a large decrease in population after just two extreme weather events - a severe heatwave and a severe hail storm between October 2009 and March 2010. In Europe, lesser kestrels seem to adjust to ongoing warming, but have been observed to lose more offspring during the extreme drought months.

Climate change is known to increase the risk and the severity of wildfires in many parts of the world, where it dries out vegetation and reduces the extent of snowpack. Wildfires can destroy the habitats of certain birds: after the 2019–20 Australian bushfire season, emu subpopulations on the New South Wales coast are considered at high risk. During the 2020 Western United States wildfire season, one of the only two strongholds of Cassia Crossbill was engulfed in flames. While most bird species can survive the immediate destruction of their habitat by flying away, they can still be heavily affected by wildfire smoke. This is a particular concern for migratory bird species who can be caught in a smoke-filled area right as they are migrating. In 2020, "hundreds of thousands and possibly even up to a million birds have died across at least five U.S. states and in four Mexican states", primarily of migratory species. This "unprecedented" event was connected to wildfire smoke the following year.

Shorebird habitats are often negatively affected by sea level rise, both due to the gradual degradation from the ongoing trend, and the sudden storm surges and other extreme events. Later in the century, sea level on the East Coast of the United States may advance high enough that a large hurricane could flood up to 95% of current piping plover habitat in the area, while its ability to shift habitat inland may be constrained by future shoreline development. Gulf Coast populations are also at risk, with a potential 16% loss of habitat by 2100 to gradual inundation alone, and a risk of both extreme storms and further human development of the shoreline. Ironically, inland piping plover populations may benefit from stronger floods powered by climate change, as the open sand shoals they nest in can only avoid vegetation overgrowth if they are flooded regularly, ideally once in four years, which occurred before the European colonization of the Americas but has now been reduced to once per twenty years by shoreline stabilization efforts to protect human property. Consequently, future flooding caused by climate change may be restoring a historical norm for the species, although there is a small risk of climate change either leading to excessive flooding or drying the area under some scenarios.

=== Range ===
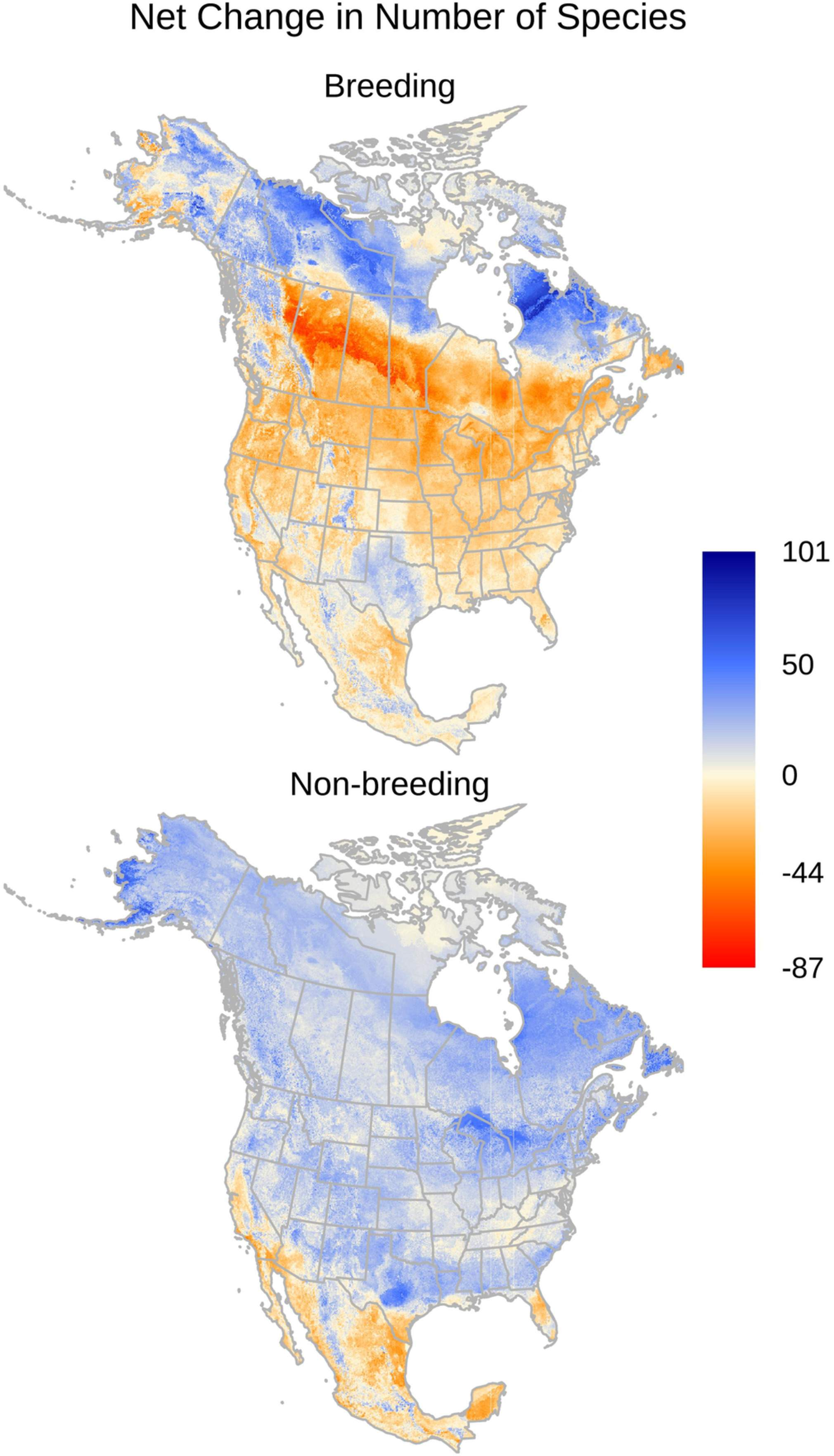
Areas of North America which are predicted to have species move into them on net (blue) or lose them (red) at 3 °C (5.4 °F) of warming from the preindustrial.

Climate change can make nesting conditions intolerable for various bird species. For instance, shorebirds nest in sand, and the coastal populations of least terns and piping plovers are already known to suffer from sand temperatures increasing and at times getting too hot, while desert birds can outright die of dehydration on unprecedentedly hot days. The range of many birds is expected to shift as the result, as "climate change forces species to move, adapt or die." For instance, young house sparrows have been observed to travel further from their parents' nests than before, in response to warming temperatures. Climate change had also been connected with the observed decline in numbers and range reduction of the rusty blackbird, a formerly common yet currently vulnerable North American species. Range shifts are generally increasing in latitude, like with two Asian subspecies of Black-tailed godwit, which are expected to shift closer to the North Pole. Their overall habitat is likely to shrink dramatically to about 16% of its present extent, with all the former high-suitability areas lost. In addition to moving polewards, bird species near the mountains shift to the cooler climate of higher elevations. In India, 66–73% of 1,091 species are expected to move upwards or northwards in response to climate change. Around 60% will see their ranges shrink, with the rest gaining in range.

Besides rising temperatures, climate change can also impact birds' ranges through changes in precipitation. For instance, increased rainfall in some alpine climates is consistent with predictions of effects of climate change on the water cycle. This includes some habitat of savannah sparrows and horned larks, which are known to have higher daily nest mortalities if their environment rained consecutively for more than two days, compared with no rain at all. The Grey-headed robin is restricted to rainforests of the wet tropics region in Australia's northeast Queensland. It needs cooler temperatures that can only be found in the higher altitudes, yet unlike other species, it cannot keep shifting its range all the way up the mountains, as otherwise it suffers from excessive precipitation. These restrictions on available range make it particularly vulnerable to future climate change. On the other hand, in North America, the southwestern willow flycatcher is expected to lose at least 62% of its population size by 2100 under a high-warming scenario and 36% under an intermediate scenario, but may not suffer any losses under a low-warming scenario, in large part due to its evolutionary potential. However, if the future effects of drought end up particularly severe for the species during its nesting season, it may end up losing the majority of its population size even in the low-warming scenario, and 93% or >99% in the higher-warming scenarios.

Human actions often interact with the effects of climate change. For example, in South American grasslands, the campo miner would lose 77–92% of its area by 2080 under the high-warming scenario and 68–74% under the intermediate scenario, which is particularly concerning due to the lack of protected areas for this species. The pied crow has seen its range decrease in northern Africa but increase in southern Africa due to climate change. Climate change favors the development of forests over grasslands in southern Africa, which provides more trees for nesting. However, their increase in range and density in the south has been helped by electrical power lines. Electrical infrastructure provides additional nesting and perching sites, which may have increased the overall prevalence of the species. And in North America, projected range shifts have been described as "unbelievable" by the experts of National Audubon Society. While one reason is their geographic distance, the other is because for non-migratory species, they can only become reality with assisted migration, as otherwise they wouldn't be able to cross the natural barriers to the newly suitable habitats and would instead be simply extirpated from their old ones.

== Extinction ==
In 2012, it was estimated that on average, every degree of warming results in between 100 and 500 land bird extinctions. For a warming of 3.5 °C (6.3 °F) by 2100, the same research estimated between 600 and 900 land bird extinctions, with 89% occurring in the tropical environments. A 2013 study estimated that 608–851 bird species (6–9%) are highly vulnerable to climate change while being on the IUCN Red List of threatened species, and 1,715–4,039 (17–41%) bird species are not currently threatened but could become threatened due to climate change in the future.

A 2023 paper concluded that under the high-warming SSP5–8.5 scenario, 51.8% of birds would lose at least some habitat by 2100 as the conditions become more arid, but only 5.3% would lose over half of their habitat due to an increase in dryness alone, while 1.3% could be expected to lose their entire habitat. These figures go down to 38.7%, 2% and 1% under the "intermediate" SSP2-4.5 scenario and to 22.8%, 0.7% and 0.5% under the high-mitigation SSP1-2.6.

== Effects of climate change mitigation activities ==
Climate change mitigation benefits most bird species in the long run by limiting harmful effects of climate change. However, mitigation strategies may have more complex unintended outcomes. Some provide co-benefits as forest management to thin forest fire fuels may increase bird habitat. Certain cropping strategies for renewable biomass may also increase overall species richness compared to traditional agricultural practices. On the other hand, tidal power systems may affect wader birds, but there's little research due to the limited uptake of this form of renewable energy.

Wind farms are known for being dangerous to birds, and have been found to harm species such as white-tailed eagles and whooper swans. This may be a problem of visual acuity, as most birds have a poor frontal vision. Wind turbine collisions could potentially be reduced if towers were made more conspicuous to birds, or placed in better locations.

In the United States, it has been estimated that between 140,000 and 500,000 birds die every year from collisions with wind turbines, which could increase to 1.4 million if the wind power capacity were increased six-fold. On average, collisions are the least frequent in the Great Plains region, where about 2.92 birds collide with a turbine every year, are higher in the West and East of the country (4.72 and 6.86 birds per turbine annually) and are the highest in California where 7.85 birds collide with each turbine every year.

In general, older wind farms tended to consider birds less in their placement, and this led to greater mortality rates than for wind farms installed after the development of improved guidelines. Newer research shows that in the Indian state of Karnataka, annual fatalities per turbine are at 0.26 per year, which includes both birds and bats. When a coastal wind farm was built on the East Asian-Australasian Flyway, bird community appeared to adjust after one year of operations. However, even the older wind farms were estimated to be responsible for losing less than 0.4 birds per gigawatt-hour (GWh) of electricity generated in 2009, compared to over 5 birds per GWh for fossil fueled power stations.

== See also ==
- Assisted migration
- Effects of climate change on biomes
- Bird migration perils
- Bird fallout
- Bird conservation
- Season creep
