= Spring (season) =

One of the Earth's four temperate seasons

Temperate season
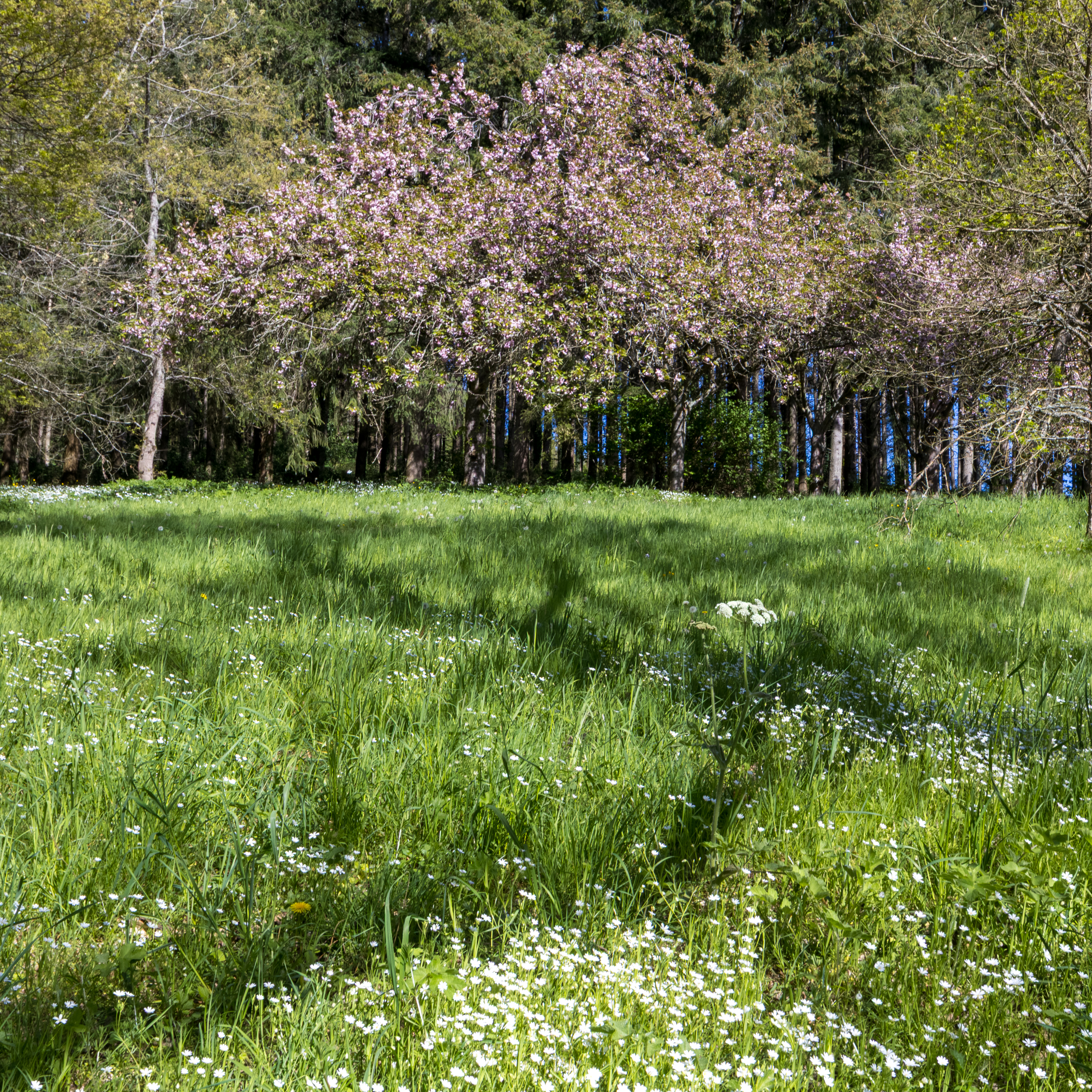
- Blooming flowers and trees in spring in Belgium

Northern temperate zone
- Astronomical season: 20 March – 21 June
- Meteorological season: 1 March – 31 May
- Solar (Celtic) season: 1 February – 30 April

Southern temperate zone
- Astronomical season: 23 September – 22 December
- Meteorological season: 1 September – 30 November
- Solar (Celtic) season: 1 August – 31 October
- Summer; Spring Autumn; Winter

Spring, also known as springtime, is one of the four temperate seasons, succeeding winter and preceding summer. There are various technical definitions of spring, but local usage of the term varies according to local climate, cultures and customs. When it is spring in the Northern Hemisphere, it is autumn in the Southern Hemisphere and vice versa. At the spring equinox, also called the vernal equinox, days and nights are approximately twelve hours long, with daytime length increasing and nighttime length decreasing as the season progresses until the summer solstice. The spring equinox is in March in the Northern Hemisphere and in September in the Southern Hemisphere, while the summer solstice is in June in the Northern Hemisphere and in December in the Southern Hemisphere.

Spring and "springtime" refer to the season, and also to ideas of rebirth, rejuvenation, renewal, resurrection and regrowth. Subtropical and tropical areas have climates better described in terms of other seasons, e.g. dry or wet, monsoonal or cyclonic. Cultures may have local names for seasons which have little equivalence to the terms originating in Europe.

== Etymology ==
According to the Online Etymological Dictionary, "spring" in the sense of the season comes from phrases such as "springing time" (14th century) and "the spring of the year". This use is from an archaic noun meaning "act or time of springing or appearing; the first appearance; the beginning, birth, rise, or origin". Spring as a word in general appeared via the Middle English springen, via the Old English springan. These were verbs meaning to rise up or to burst forth, (see also the modern German springen 'jump') and are not believed to have originally related to the season. These all originate from Proto-Germanic *sprenganan.

== Meteorological reckoning ==
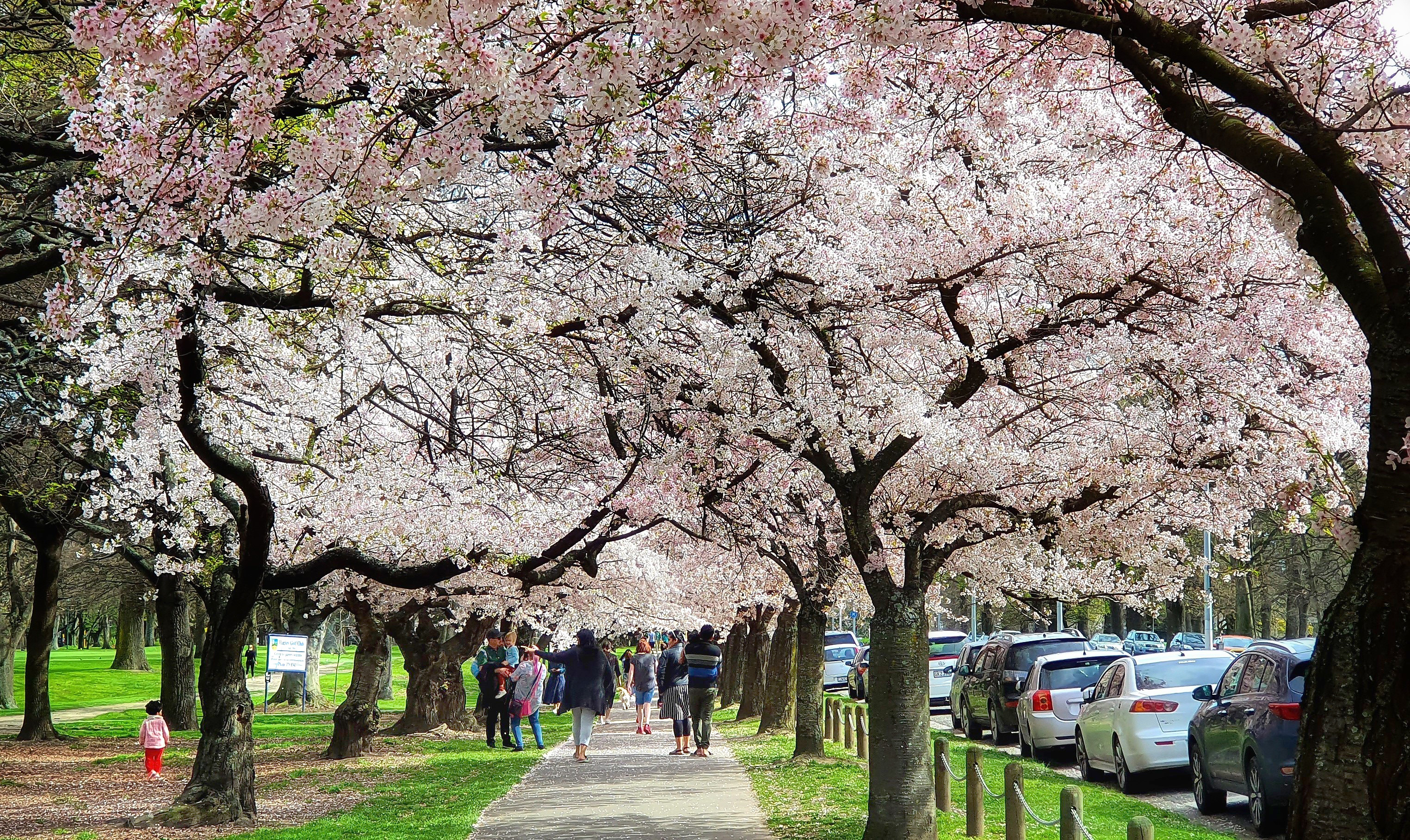
Cherry blossoms flowering during springtime in Christchurch, New Zealand

Meteorologists generally define four seasons in many climatic areas: spring, summer, autumn (fall), and winter. These are determined by the values of their average temperatures on a monthly basis, with each season lasting three calendar months. The three warmest months are by definition summer, the three coldest months are winter, and the intervening gaps are spring and autumn. Meteorological spring can therefore start on different dates in different regions.

In the United States and United Kingdom, spring months are March, April, and May.

In Ireland, following the Irish calendar, spring is often defined as February, March, and April.

In Sweden, meteorologists define the beginning of spring as the first occasion on which the average 24 hours temperature exceeds zero degrees Celsius for seven consecutive days, thus the date varies with latitude and elevation (but no earlier than 15 February, and no later than 31 July).

In Australia, New Zealand, South Africa and Brazil the spring months are September, October, and November.

== Astronomical and solar reckoning ==
In the Northern Hemisphere (with countries such as Germany, the United States, Canada, and the UK), solar reckoning was traditionally used with the solstices and equinoxes representing the midpoints of each season, however, the astronomical vernal equinox (varying between 19 and 21 March) can be taken to mark the first day of spring with the summer solstice (around 21 June) marked as first day of summer. By solar reckoning, Spring is held to begin 1 February until the first day of Summer on May Day, with the summer and winter solstices being marked as Midsummer and Midwinter respectively, instead of as the beginning of the season as is the case with astronomical reckoning.

In Persian culture the first day of spring is the first day of the first month (called Farvardin) which begins on 20 or 21 March.

In the traditional Chinese calendar, the "spring" season (春) consists of the days between Lichun (3–5 February), taking Chunfen (20–22 March) as its midpoint, then ending at Lixia (5–7 May). Similarly, according to the Celtic tradition, which is based solely on daylight and the strength of the noon sun, spring begins in early February (near Imbolc or Candlemas) and continues until early May (Beltane), with Saint Patrick's Day (17 March) being regarded as the middle day of spring. Late Roman Republic scholar Marcus Terentius Varro defined spring as lasting from the seventh day before the Ides of Februarius (7 February) to the eighth day before the Ides of Maius (8 May).

The spring season in India is culturally in the months of March and April, with an average temperature of approx 32 °C. Some people in India especially from Karnataka state celebrate their new year in spring, Ugadi.

== Ecological reckoning ==
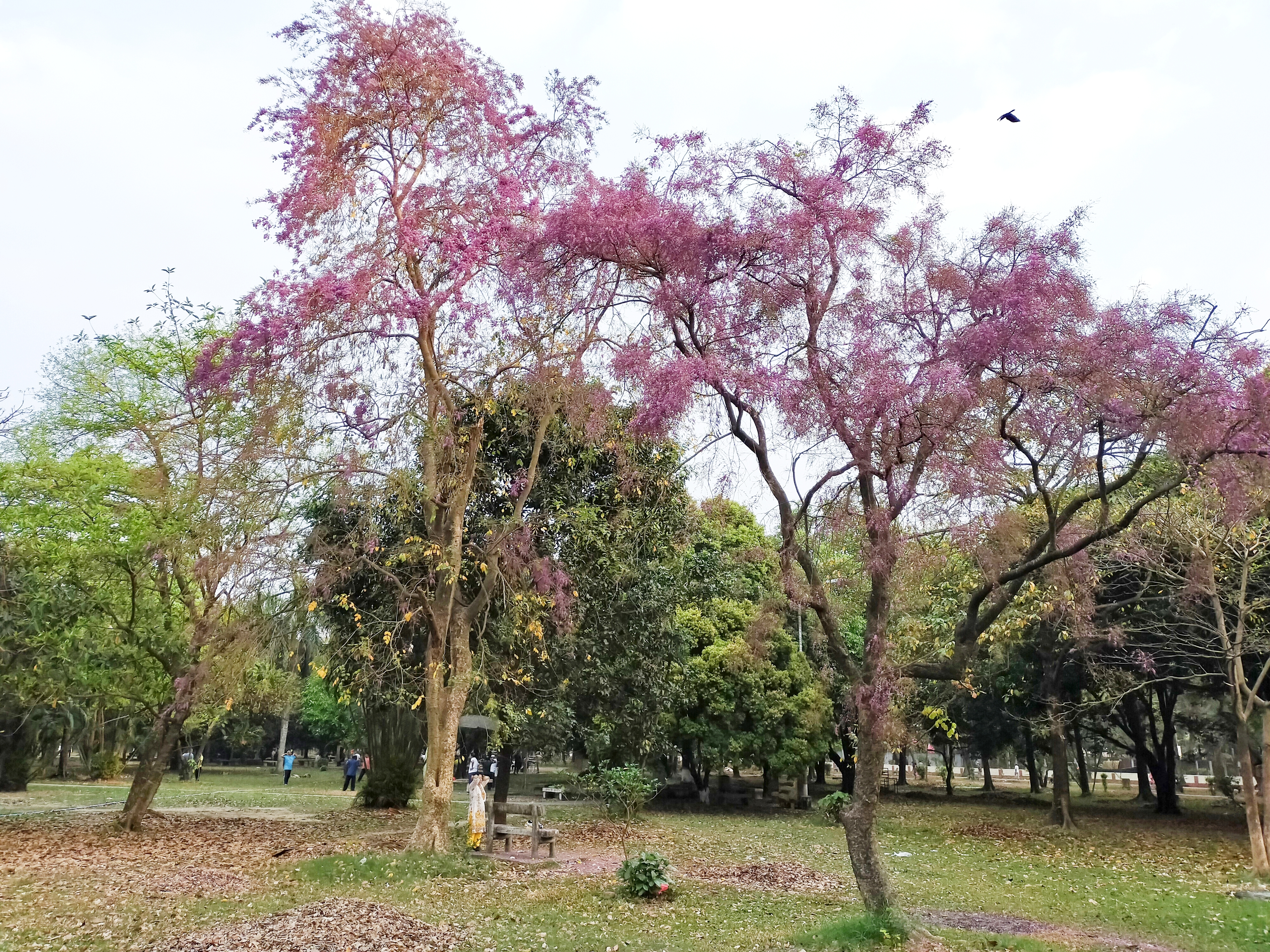
Blooming Millettia peguensis in spring at Ramna Park, Dhaka

The beginning of spring is not always determined by fixed calendar dates. The phenological or ecological definition of spring relates to biological indicators, such as the blossoming of a range of plant species, the activities of animals, and the special smell of soil that has reached the temperature for micro flora to flourish. These indicators, along with the beginning of spring, vary according to the local climate and according to the specific weather of a particular year. In England, Wales and Northern Ireland, the National Trust runs the #BlossomWatch campaign, which encourages people to share images of blossom with one another, as an early indicator of the arrival of the season.

Some ecologists divide the year into six seasons. In addition to spring, ecological reckoning identifies an earlier separate prevernal (early or pre-spring) season between the hibernal (winter) and vernal (spring) seasons. This is a time when only the hardiest flowers like the crocus are in bloom, sometimes while there is still some snowcover on the ground.

== Natural events ==
As a result of global warming, average springtime temperatures have risen in the 48 contiguous US states since the middle of the 20th century.

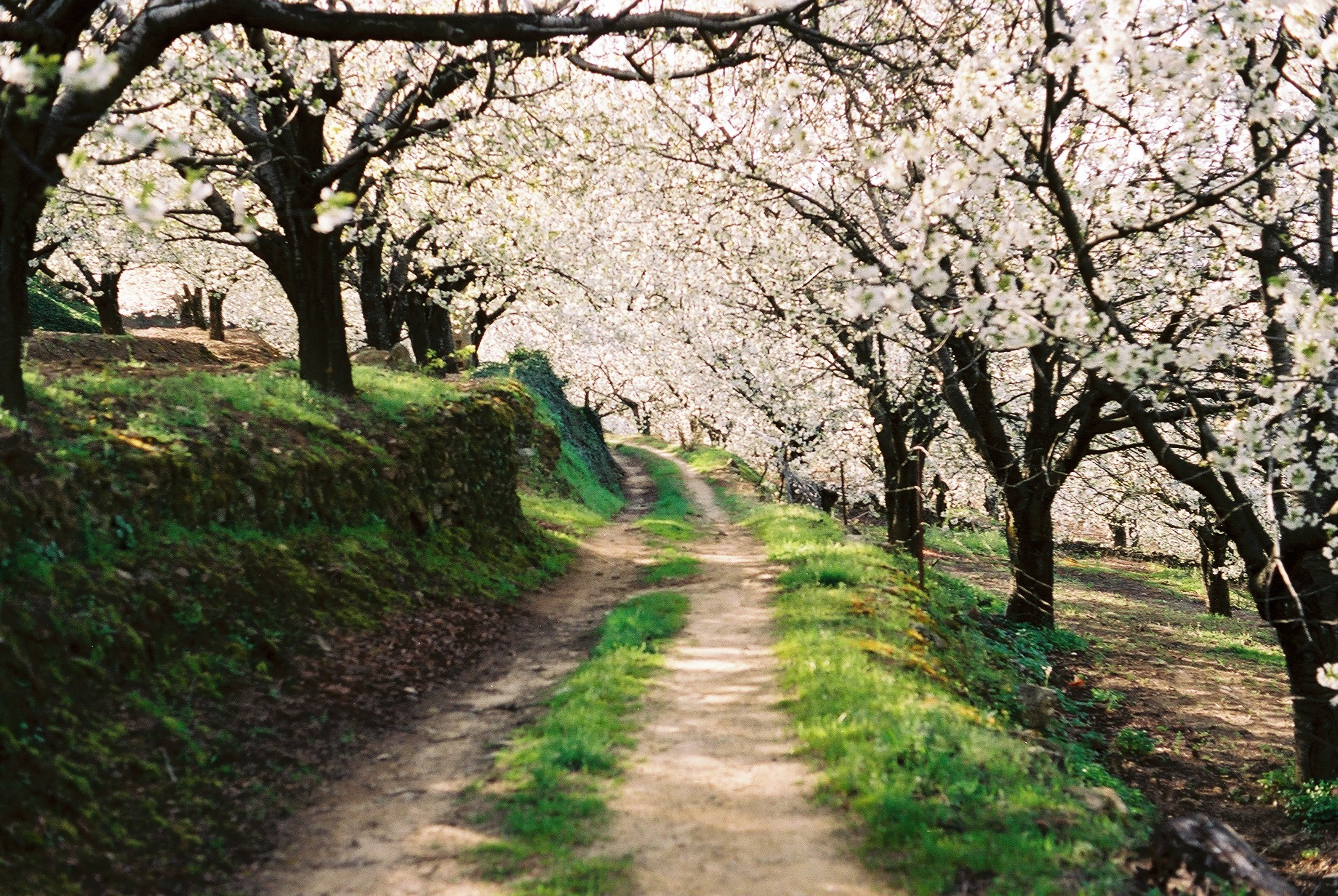
Hundreds of sour cherry blooming in Extremadura, Spain, during spring

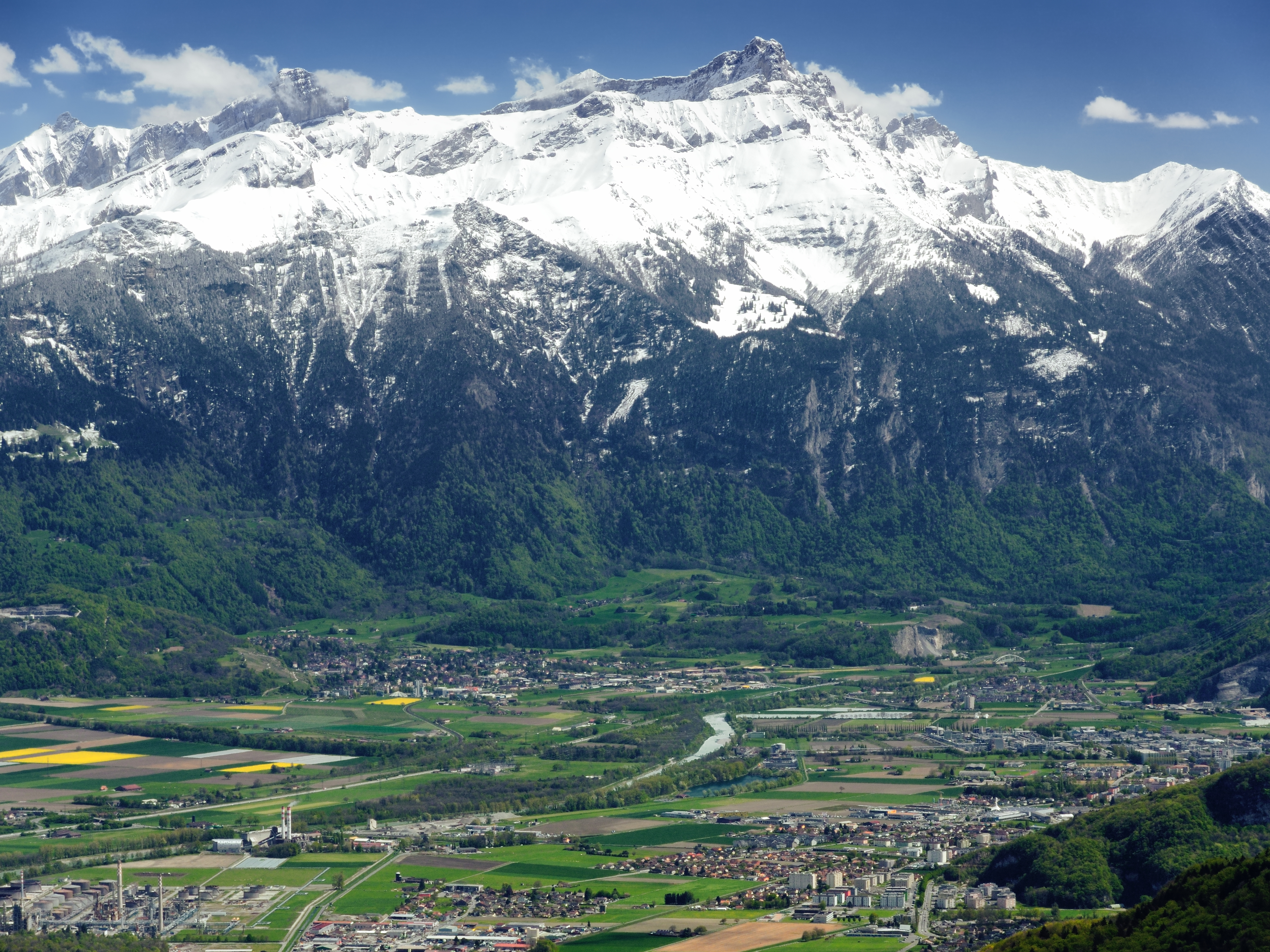
Late April in the Alps. At high elevations (or latitudes), spring is often the snowiest period of the year.

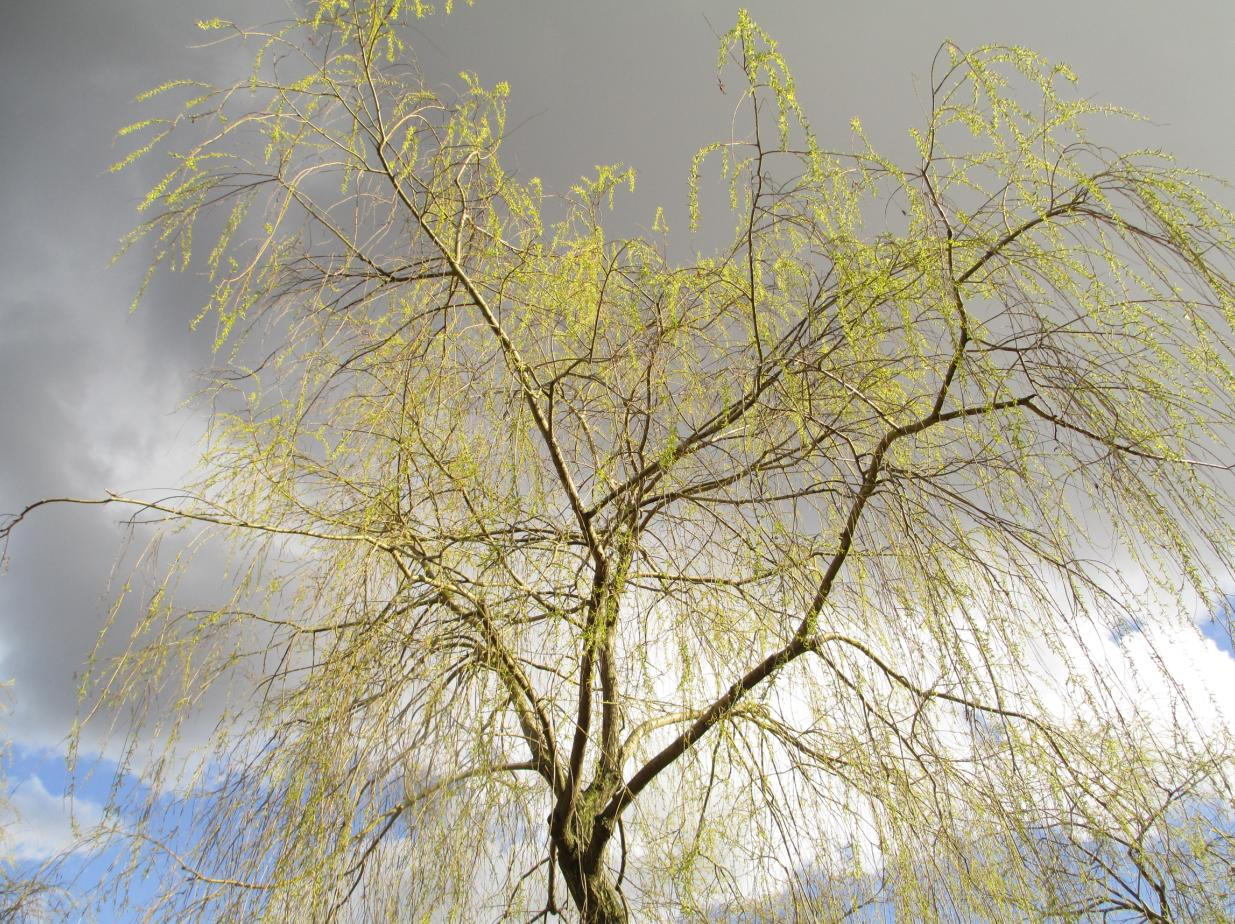
A willow in Stockholm in April 2016

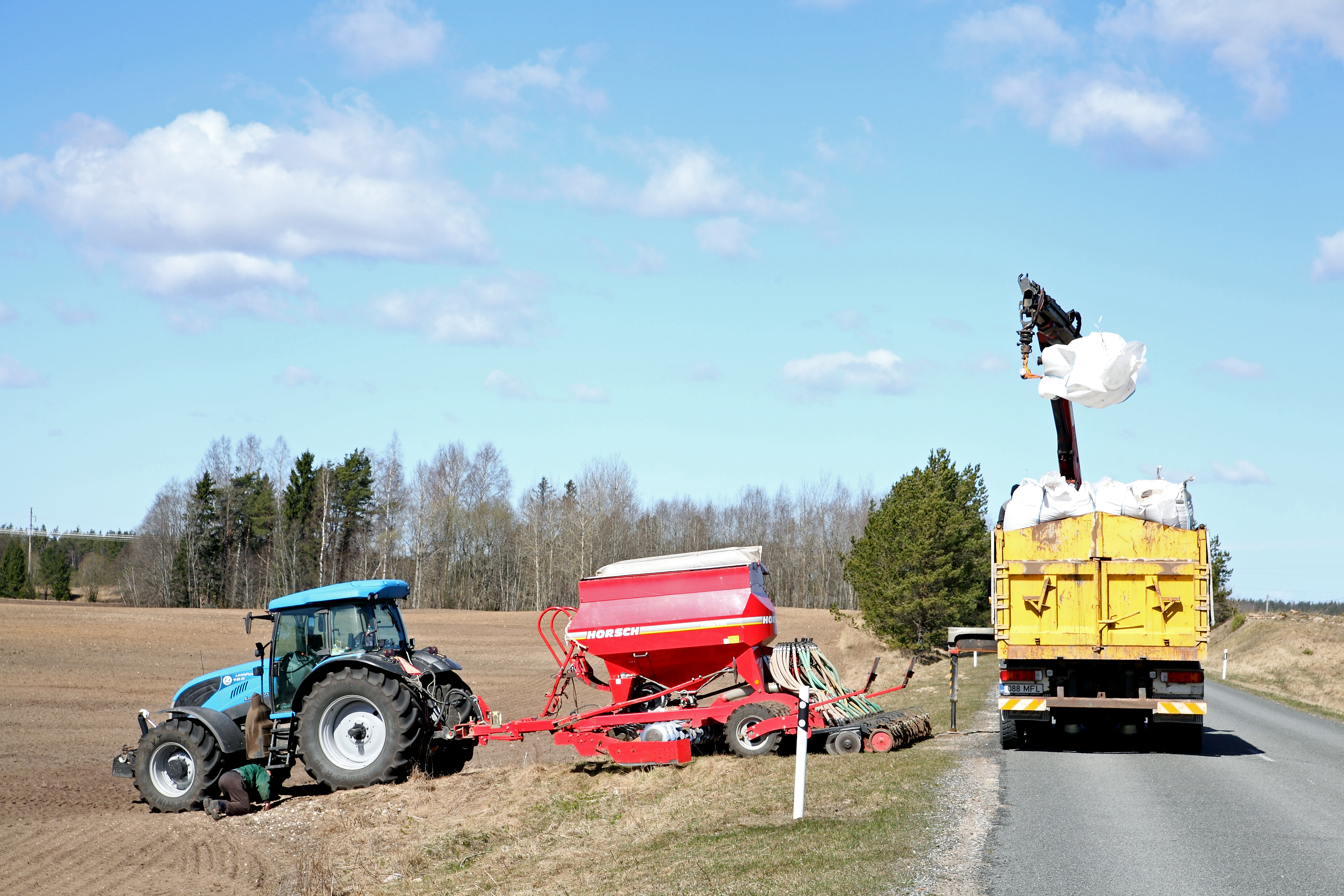
Sowing at spring in Estonia

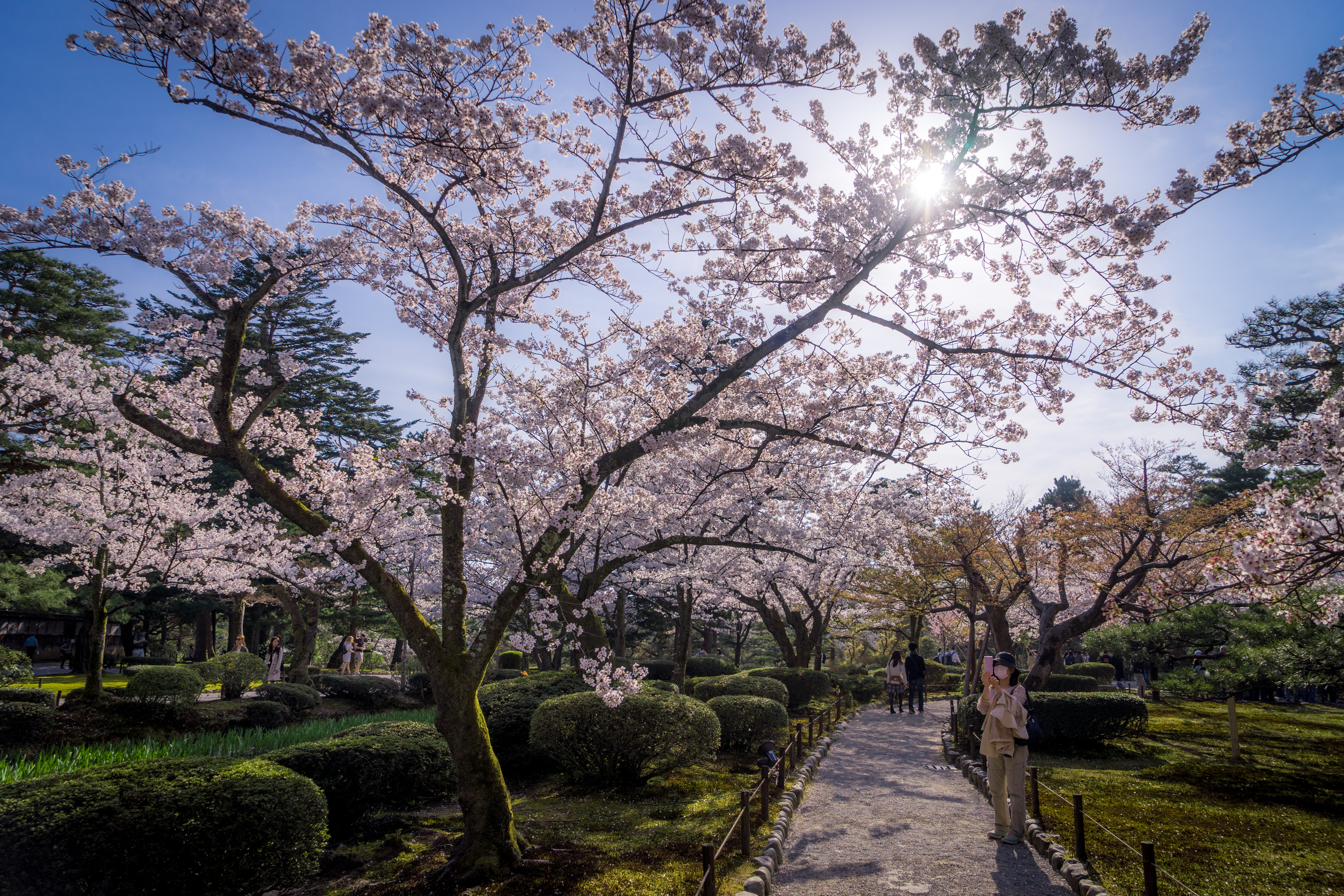
Blooming trees of Cherry blossom in Japan

During early spring, the axis of the Earth is increasing its tilt relative to the Sun, and the length of daylight rapidly increases for the relevant hemisphere. The hemisphere begins to warm significantly, causing new plant growth to "spring forth", giving the season its name.

Any snow begins to melt, swelling streams with runoff and any frosts become less severe. In climates that have no snow, and rare frosts, air and ground temperatures increase more rapidly.

Many flowering plants bloom at this time of year, in a long succession, sometimes beginning when snow is still on the ground and continuing into early summer. In normally snowless areas, "spring" may begin as early as February (Northern Hemisphere) or August (Southern Hemisphere), heralded by the blooming of deciduous magnolias, cherries, and quince. Many temperate areas have a dry spring, and wet autumn (fall), which brings about flowering in this season, more consistent with the need for water, as well as warmth. Subarctic areas may not experience "spring" at all until May.

While spring is a result of the warmth caused by the changing orientation of the Earth's axis relative to the Sun, the weather in many parts of the world is affected by other, less predictable events. The rainfall in spring (or any season) follows trends more related to longer cycles—such as the solar cycle—or events created by ocean currents and ocean temperatures—for example, the El Niño effect and the Southern Oscillation Index.

Unstable spring weather may occur more often when warm air begins to invade from lower latitudes, while cold air is still pushing from the Polar regions. Flooding is also most common in and near mountainous areas during this time of year, because of snow-melt which is accelerated by warm rains. In North America, Tornado Alley is most active at this time of year, especially since the Rocky Mountains prevent the surging hot and cold air masses from spreading eastward, and instead force them into direct conflict. Besides tornadoes, supercell thunderstorms can also produce dangerously large hail and very high winds, for which a severe thunderstorm warning or tornado warning is usually issued. Even more so than in winter, the jet streams play an important role in unstable and severe Northern Hemisphere weather in springtime.

In recent decades, season creep has been observed, which means that many phenological signs of spring are occurring earlier in many regions by around two days per decade.

Spring in the Southern Hemisphere is different in several significant ways to that of the Northern Hemisphere for several reasons, including:

1. There is no land bridge between Southern Hemisphere countries and the Antarctic zone capable of bringing in cold air without the temperature-mitigating effects of extensive tracts of water;
2. The vastly greater amount of ocean in the Southern Hemisphere at most latitudes;
3. There is a circumpolar flow of air (the roaring 40s and 50s) uninterrupted by large land masses;
4. No equivalent jet streams; and
5. The peculiarities of the reversing ocean currents in the Pacific.

== Cultural associations ==
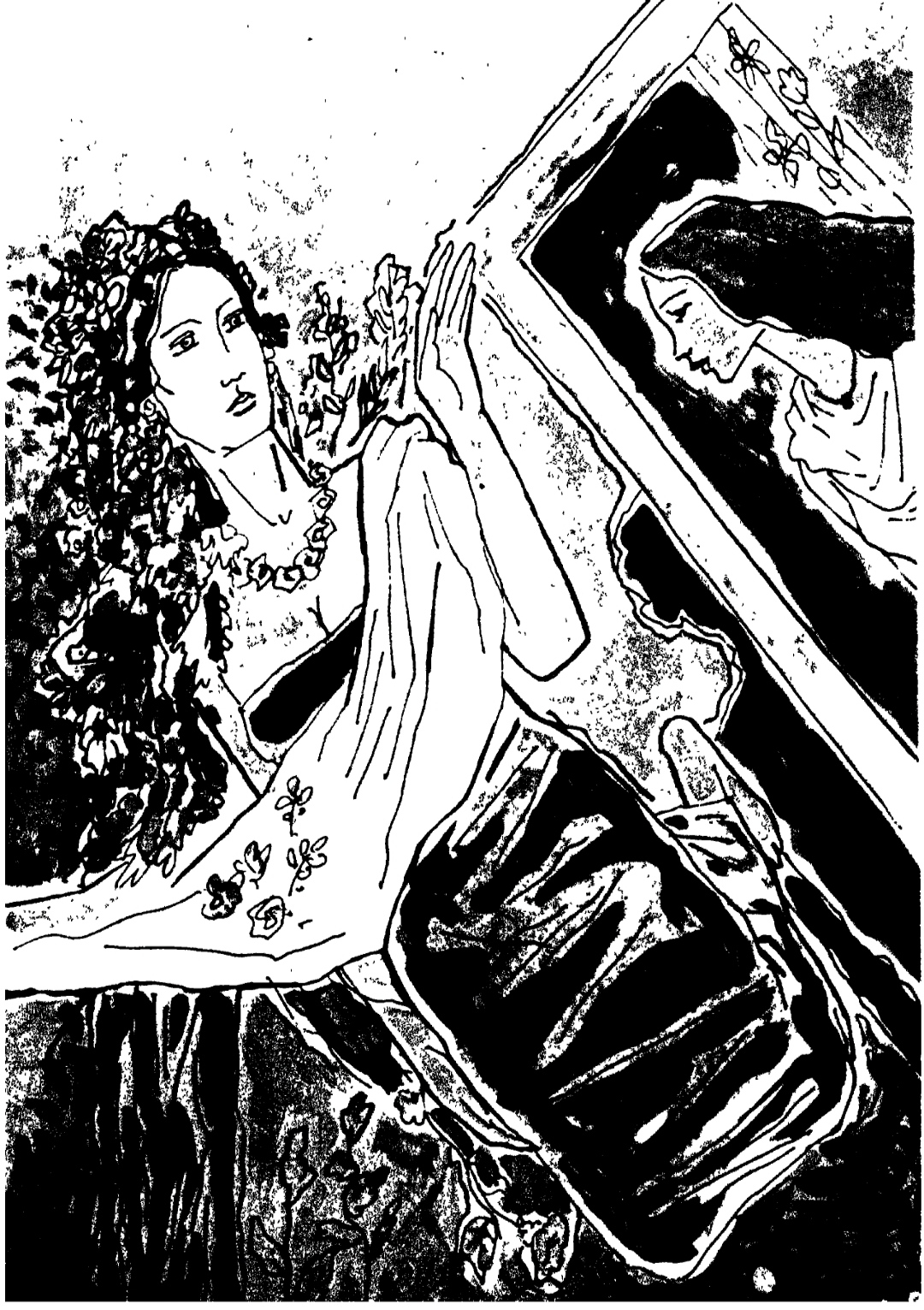
Divine female personification of Yenningtha (Meitei for 'spring season') in Meitei mythology and folklore

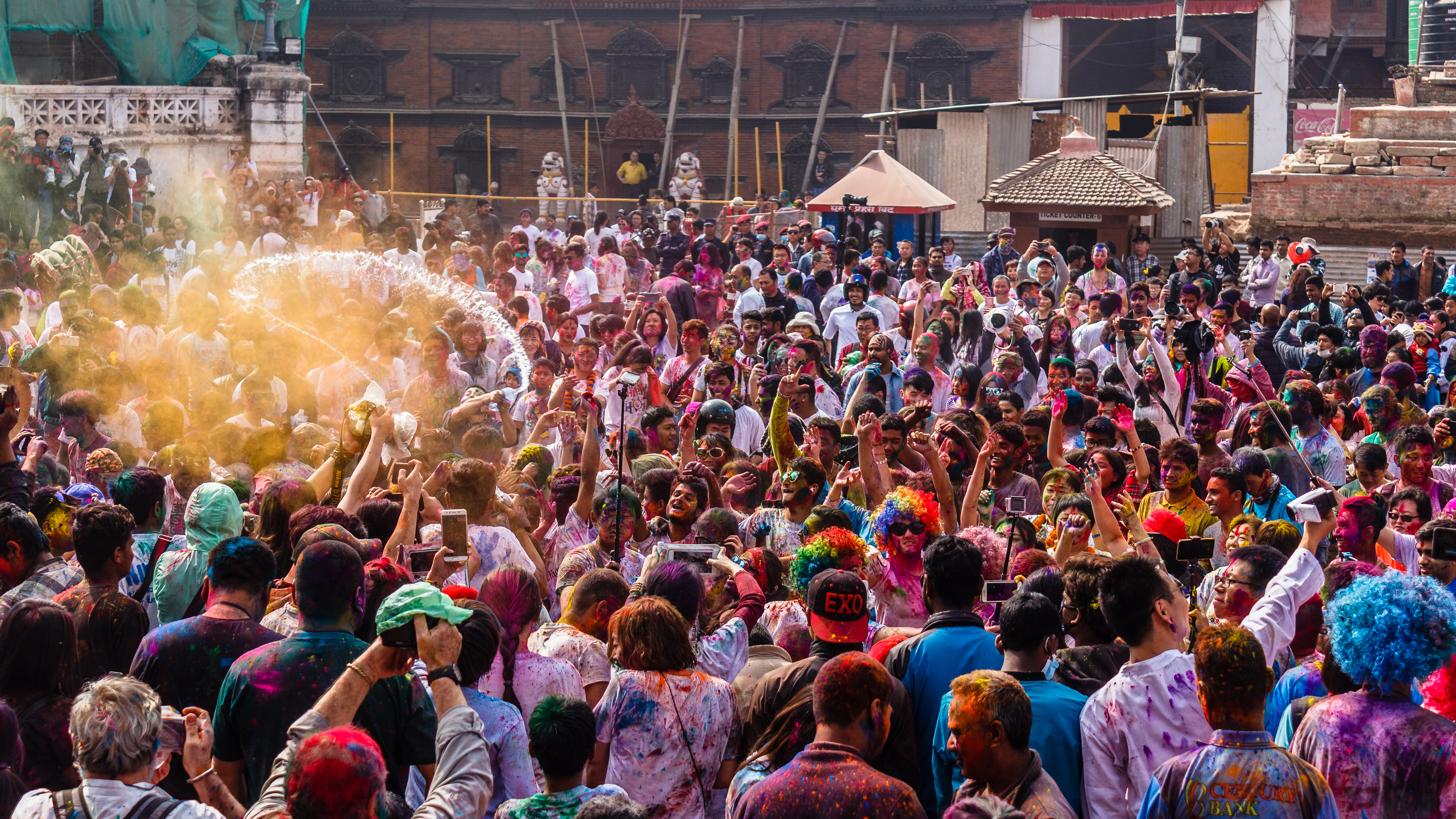
Holi in Nepal

=== Carnival ===
Carnival is practiced by many Christians around the world in the days before Lent (40 days, without Sundays, before Easter). It is the first spring festival of the new year for many.

=== Easter ===
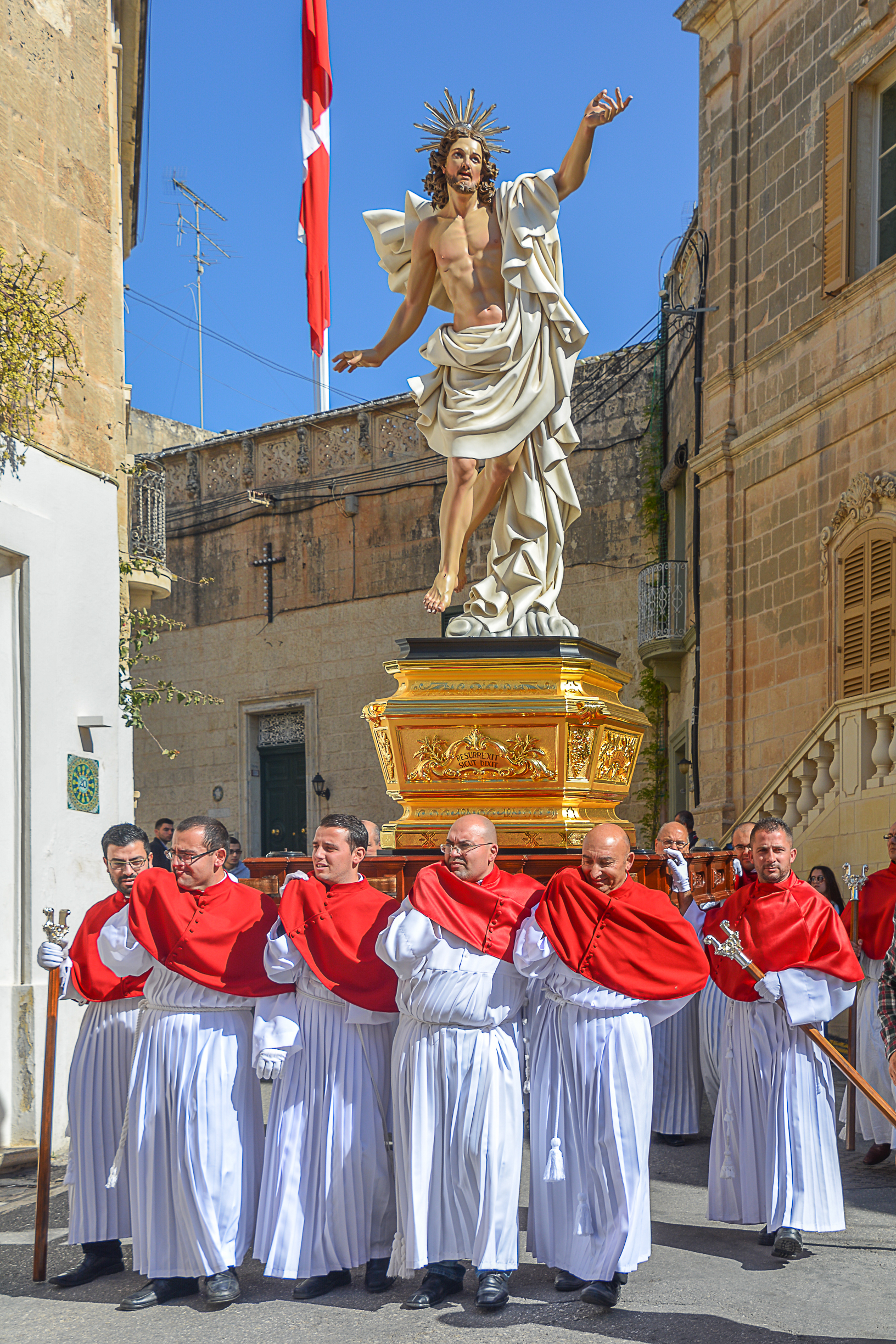
Easter procession, commemorating the Resurrection of Jesus

Easter is the most important religious feast in the Christian liturgical year. Christians believe that Jesus was resurrected from the dead on the "third day" (Note: This resurrection is commonly said to have occurred "on the third day after resting for the Sabbath (Friday sundown to Saturday sundown), including the day of crucifixion." (e.g. Luke 24:21 KJV)) (two days after his crucifixion), and celebrate this resurrection on Easter Day, two days after Good Friday. Since the Last Supper was a Passover Seder, the date of Easter can be calculated as the first Sunday after the start of Passover. This is usually (see Passover below) the first Sunday after the first full moon following the spring equinox. The date of Easter varies between 22 March and 25 April (which corresponds to between 4 April and 8 May in the Gregorian Calendar for the Eastern and Oriental Orthodox Churches using the Julian Calendar). In this celebration, the children do an easter egg hunt.

=== May Day ===
The First of May is the date of many public holidays. In many countries, May Day is synonymous with International Workers' Day, or Labour Day, which celebrates the social and economic achievements of the labour movement. As a day of celebration, the holiday has ancient origins, and it can relate to many customs that have survived into modern times. Many of these customs are due to May Day being a cross-quarter day, meaning that (in the Northern Hemisphere where it is almost exclusively celebrated) it falls approximately halfway between the spring equinox and summer solstice. In the Celtic tradition, this date marked the end of spring and the beginning of summer.

=== Passover ===
The Passover begins on the 15th day of the month of Nisan, which typically falls in March or April of the Gregorian calendar on the night of a full moon after the northern spring equinox. However, due to leap months falling after the vernal equinox, Passover sometimes starts on the second full moon after vernal equinox, as in 2016. Jewish people celebrate this holiday to commemorate their escape from slavery in Egypt as described in the book of Exodus in the Torah. Foods consumed during Passover seders, such as lamb and barley, are tied to springtime seasonal availability. In this celebration, children recite the Four Questions during the seder and hunt for the afikoman afterwards.

=== Allhallowtide ===
The Western Christian season encompassing the triduum of All Saints' Eve (Halloween), All Saints' Day (All Hallows') and All Souls' Day are observed in the spring in the Southern Hemisphere.

== See also ==
- Akitu (Ancient Mesopotamia, Sumer, Babylonia)
- Bihu (India)
- Chinese New Year
- Floriade (Australia)
- Holi (India, Nepal)
- Mărțișor (Romania)
- Nowruz (Iran)
- Pahela Falgun (Bangladesh)
- Saint Patrick's Day (Northern Hemisphere)
- Sham el-Nessim (Egypt)
- Sinhala New Year (Sri Lanka)
- Spring break
- Spring Carnival (Australia)
- Spring cleaning
- Spring Day (Many countries)
- St Brigid's Day (Ireland)
- Tết (Vietnam)
- Vasant panchami (India)
