= Bird migration perils =

Examples of long distance bird migration routes

Migrating birds face many perils as they travel between breeding and wintering grounds each year.

Migration is a dangerous part of a bird's life cycle, with many trade-offs; birds receive benefits from wintering and breeding in better quality habitats, at the price of higher predation risks and greater energy expenditure.

Hazards during migration include collisions with manmade objects such as glass windows and railings on buildings, power lines and communication towers, predation by pet and feral domestic cats, collisions with vehicles, and lack of stopover habitat where birds can refuel. Contrary to popular belief, collisions with wind turbines represent a relatively small proportion of bird mortality compared to other primary sources of collisions. The risk of starvation is increased when stopover sites are lost through climate change or loss of habitat to development or agriculture. Mortality on both breeding and wintering grounds may be increased for similar reasons.

== Context ==
Migrants tend to travel away from polar and temperate zones in the winter because of low temperatures and shortage of food in their breeding areas. During spring migration, birds return to their breeding sites to exploit the temporary superabundance of food, allowing them to raise more young.

Many populations of migratory birds are in serious decline. Anthropogenic reasons for this include deforestation and habitat loss, hunting, pesticide uses, urbanization, and climate change. Identifying and understanding the processes and perils can allow us to implement effective management and conservation strategies for these species.

== Immediate perils ==
=== Bad weather ===
In-flight mortality: poor weather conditions can significantly decrease bird populations, especially during migration. Most of weather-related in-flight mortalities are due to heavy storms, mist or rain. Passerines and other small sized birds are particularly affected by adverse in-flight weather conditions, but larger birds such as eagles and swans could also be killed.

Mortality on breeding grounds: small, insect eating birds contribute to the majority of post-arrival deaths, but many other birds including waders and waterfowls are also distressed by weather changes on breeding grounds. Since young birds are inexperienced, they are more vulnerable than adults to extreme weather conditions.

Mortality on wintering grounds: Unreasonably cold temperatures on the wintering grounds kills thousands of birds, resulting in 30-90% population declines of migratory birds. For example, between 27000 and 62000 ducks, mostly tufted duck and common pochard, starved to death during a very cold winter in March 1986.

=== Hunting ===
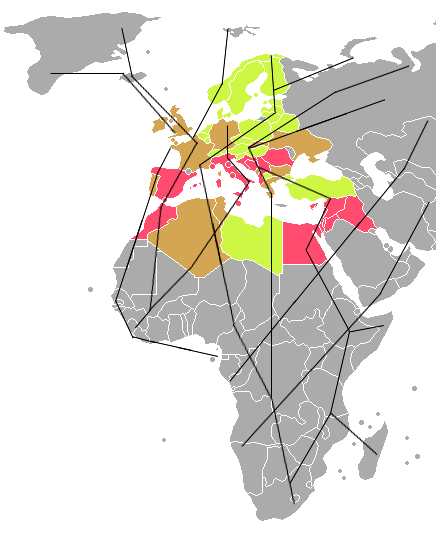
Migration routes of birds in Europe and Africa. Countries with most illegal hunting are coloured red and brown.

The passing of Migratory Bird Treaty (US, 1916) and Migratory Birds Convention Act (Canada, 1917) made it illegal to kill or capture migratory birds. Even though migratory bird acts were passed in the early 20th century, many countries still have no laws or programs to protect migratory birds. International bird trade is a multibillion-dollar industry and hundreds of exotic birds are captured and then sold all over the world.

Malta, an archipelago of small islands along the Mediterranean, is a very important migration flyway for birds. Throughout the years, hunters killed hundreds of millions of birds each year as they migrate over the island of Malta. To protect resident and migratory birds, BirdLife international had been organizing special raptors camps since the late 1990s. Even though hunting is a part of Maltese people's culture, the interference from birdwatchers all over the world has led to decreased killings of birds.

=== Bycatch from commercial fishing ===
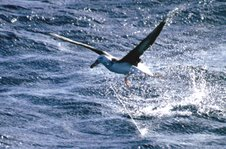
Black-browed Albatross caught on a long-line

While hunting kills millions of terrestrial birds, the bycatch from commercial fisheries is responsible for the majority of human caused mortality of migratory birds. Scientists have estimated that between 2679 and 45586 birds are killed each year as fisheries by-catch. Dredging, gillnetting bottom otter trawling and longline's are some of the main methods fisheries use to catch fish. Gillnets are responsible for the majority of seabird bycatch, followed by longline and bottom trawling. To catch tuna and other fish, long-line fishing boats drag many kilometers of hooked lines behind them. Seabirds try to catch the fish and accidentally get trapped in hooks.

Major foraging areas for vulnerable seabirds (albatrosses and shearwaters) tend to overlap with world's richest fishing grounds, thus increasing the proportions of accidental bycatch of birds. Fisheries could also indirectly affect the trophic structure and foraging methods of seabirds. Since most sea birds are long-lived and have low reproduction rates, even a small increase in bird mortality could cause significant population declines.

=== Stopover habitat loss ===
Birds use stopover sites to feed, rest and refuel during their migration period. Many of the stopover sites may be already compromised or are threatened owing to increased urbanization, agriculture, oil gas or mineral exploitation, fisheries, tourism and many other anthropogenic activities. In one study the researchers found that birds with high phenotypic plasticity can adapt their behavior and skip low-quality stopover sites. Migratory birds such as swans, geese and waders show high site fidelity (they are loyal to their stopover and cannot change them), while long distance passerines have much lower site fidelity. Passerines have low site fidelity because they can be flexible in their habitat selection. Since they do not migrate in flocks, migratory passerines do not have a fixed migration route or stop-over site sequence and they can change their stopover sites based on wind selectivity or habitat quality. Even though many birds can change their stopover sites, birds such as swans and waders depend on wetland stopover sites to 'refuel' on migration. The destruction of these sites could therefore be detrimental to bird populations.

Increased predation at stopover sites could lead to drastic declines in migratory bird populations. The study done by Lank and Ydenberg (2003) examined the effects of predators on migratory birds at stopover sites. The researchers found that predation risk is higher for heavier birds (due to decreased take-off ability) and leaner birds (increased exposure due to higher feeding needs). Many birds also developed anti-predator behaviors to lower the probability of mortality. Since anti-predator behaviors are energetically costly, the migrants with lower energy reserves allocated less time to anti-predator behaviors.

=== Collisions ===
A considerable threat to migratory birds is the threat of collision posed by man-made structures along migration routes. Such structures may include buildings, oil platforms, and wind turbines.

==== Collisions and confusion at oil platforms ====
Over 40 million seabirds are negatively affected by oil platforms. Seabirds tend to aggregate around oil rigs, attracted by artificial lighting, flares, food and other visual cues. Seabirds often collide directly with oil platforms or circle around oil rigs and flares for days, eventually dying of starvation. Birds such as storm petrels, dovekies and shearwaters migrate across the Grand Banks and hydrocarbon development near the oil platforms significantly decreases the populations of these birds.

==== Collisions with buildings ====
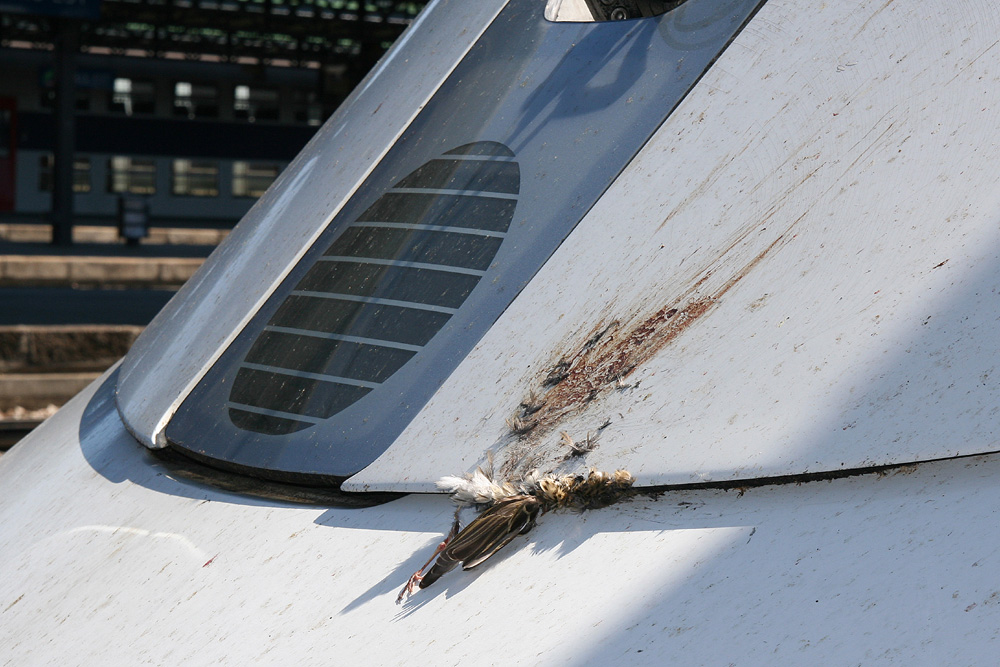
Bird killed by striking a high-speed train

Artificial light sources can attract millions of birds to lighthouses, broadcast towers and other buildings, resulting in direct mortality of birds at night. There are less artificial lights during the day, but millions of birds still die due to direct collisions with various human made structures. Birds often fatally strike the glass because they cannot differentiate between real sky and reflection of a sky in a window. Any object that increases bird density near windows can potentially lead to higher death rates. Reflective windows are particularly dangerous as birds are often attracted to them. Placing bird attractants such as bird houses, water and nutritious vegetation near windows also increases the number of birds killed. Birds may also be impacted by bright lights at nights as they have extra-retinal photoreceptors that are disoriented by the reflection of light from these buildings. Mitigating the amount of light emitted from glass surfaces at night, such as windows, can reduce the amount of fatal bird collisions with buildings and structures. To decrease the impact of artificial lighting, many cities had implemented lights out program, in which people turn off or dim the lights in tall buildings during migration season.

Lights on tall structures can disorient migrating birds leading to fatalities. An estimated 365-988 million fatal bird collisions with buildings occur annually in North America, making human-made structures a large contributor to the decline in bird species. To reduce bird strikes, it is suggested to remove all bird attractants near the windows or to partially cover the windows. For new buildings, scientists have recommended installing windows in a way that panes reflect the ground instead of the sky.

==== Collisions and disruption from wind farms ====
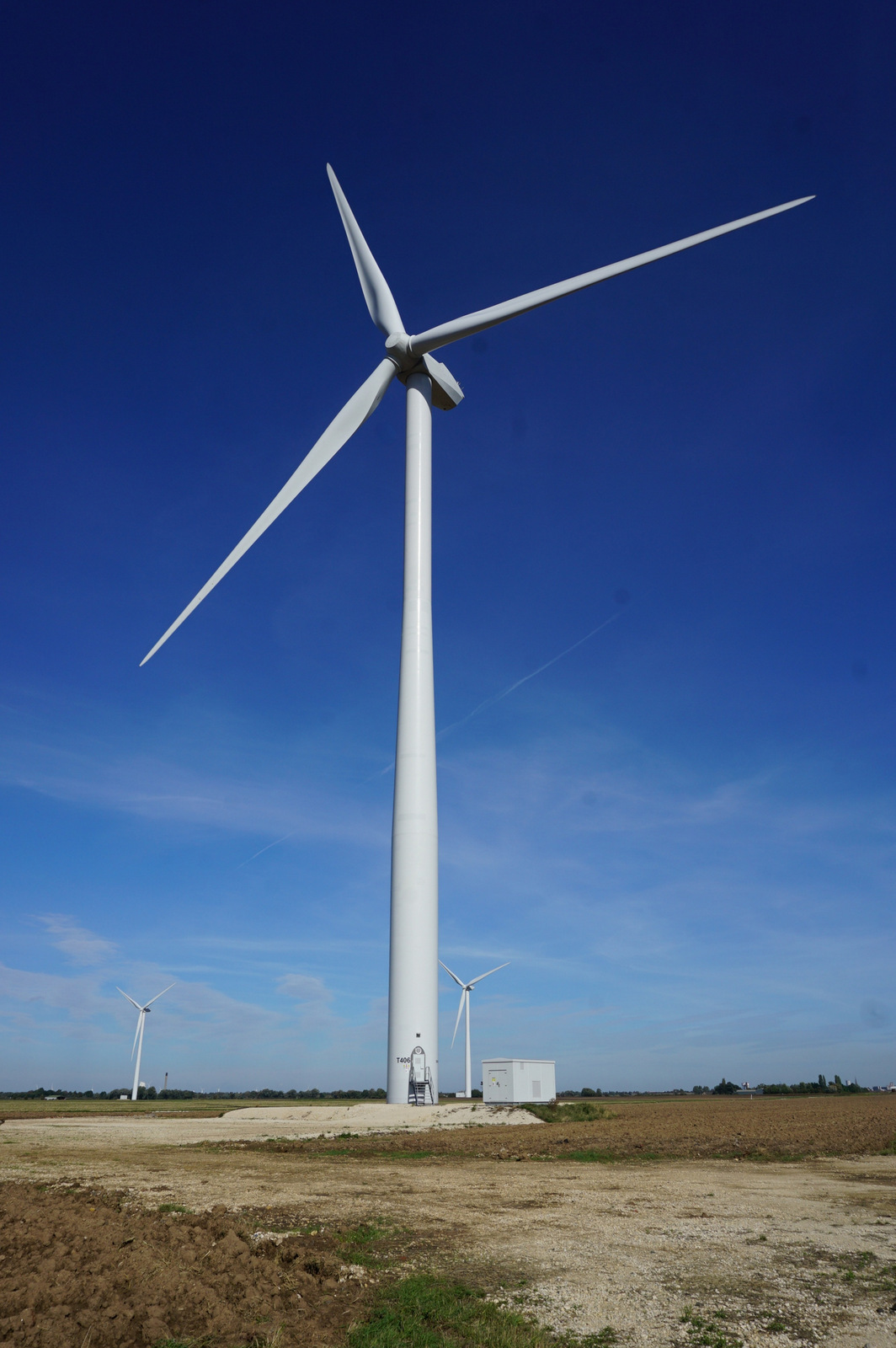
Wind turbines are a collision hazard to birds.

Wind turbines kill thousands of birds through collisions, disruption of migratory routes and destruction of habitat. Birds such as raptors (eagles, vultures), waterbirds and passerines are particularly affected. The reasons these birds are affected is because many of them have blind spots and they often cannot see objects (wind farms) directly in front of them. In Altamont Pass Wind Farm, 4000 wind turbines kill 75 golden eagles and over 1,200 other predatory birds each year. These predatory birds are rare and long lived; they also have low reproductive rates and if their populations decline substantially, they may never recover. However, if wind turbines are constructed in regions that do not overlap with migratory pathways of birds, the bird casualties could be significantly reduced. Wind farm development may also take advantage of movement corridors frequented by soaring birds. This disruption can prompt birds to completely shift their flight routes, resulting in behavioral changes and habitat loss as they abandon previously useable airspace in an effort to avoid wind turbines.

==== Collisions with aircraft ====
Bird strikes pose a threat to both human and avian life. Reported bird strikes have essentially doubled within the past couple of decades worldwide, going from an annual average of 6,702 strikes during the period 2001-2007 to an annual average of approximately 12,219 during the period 2008-2015. In addition to the risk posed by direct collisions, general airport operations and their employed wildlife hazard management techniques can result in habitat fragmentation, population decline of local bird species, and, in some cases, species extinction.

Bird-aircraft collisions are almost always fatal for the bird. Depending on the size of the bird and severity of the impact, they can also often incur a cost in equipment damages and/or threaten human life as a result. Military aviation practices pose the largest threat to bird life because of the high speeds and low altitudes at which they operate, though commercial flights are vulnerable to bird strikes as well. Commercial aircraft strikes occur primarily during take-off and landing practices as commercial cruising altitudes are often too high for the aircraft to be susceptible to bird strike risk. Seasonal bird migration leaves birds especially vulnerable to collisions, as airports lack reliable and informed technology to predict and detect these large-scale movements.

An analysis of bird strike data from three airports local to New York City and New Jersey from 2013 to 2018 indicates that 90% of reported bird strikes involved a migratory species, and 50% of strikes occurred during peak annual migration months in the spring and fall. Data indicates that large-bodied species, such as Canada geese, are more likely to be involved in damaging aircraft collisions, but that does not negate the potential for smaller birds, such as passerines, to be affected as well. Strikes involving smaller birds are often easier to overlook, cause less damage, and are therefore less likely to be reported resulting in a potential under-representation in bird strike data.

=== Poisoning by pesticides ===
Since there are very little regulations regarding pesticide use in the tropics, the farmers in South America use high quantities of highly toxic pesticides to protect their crops. For example, DDT is banned in North America because it killed millions of birds in the 1960s, but it is still heavily used in the tropics. Pesticides can kill birds both directly and indirectly. In the case of DDT, it can kill birds directly by poisoning their nervous system and indirectly by making the eggshells thinner and thus reducing reproductive success of birds.

In their study on Dickcissels and crop damage in Venezuela, Basili and Temple (1999), found that the population of Dickcissels declined by 40% between the years of 1960 and 1980. The declines were primarily due to direct killings by humans. Dickcissels migrate to Venezuela in winter and they tend to gather in large colonies (millions of birds) to feed and sleep. Farmers in Venezuela thought that Dickcissels were pests that fed on rice and cereal crops, so they aerially sprayed the region with pesticides to kill of the birds. The dickcissels consumed only 0.37-0.745% of the grains produced. If the farmers had been better informed of how small of an impact Dickcissels had on their crops, the population declines of these birds could have been prevented.

=== Navigation disrupted by light pollution ===
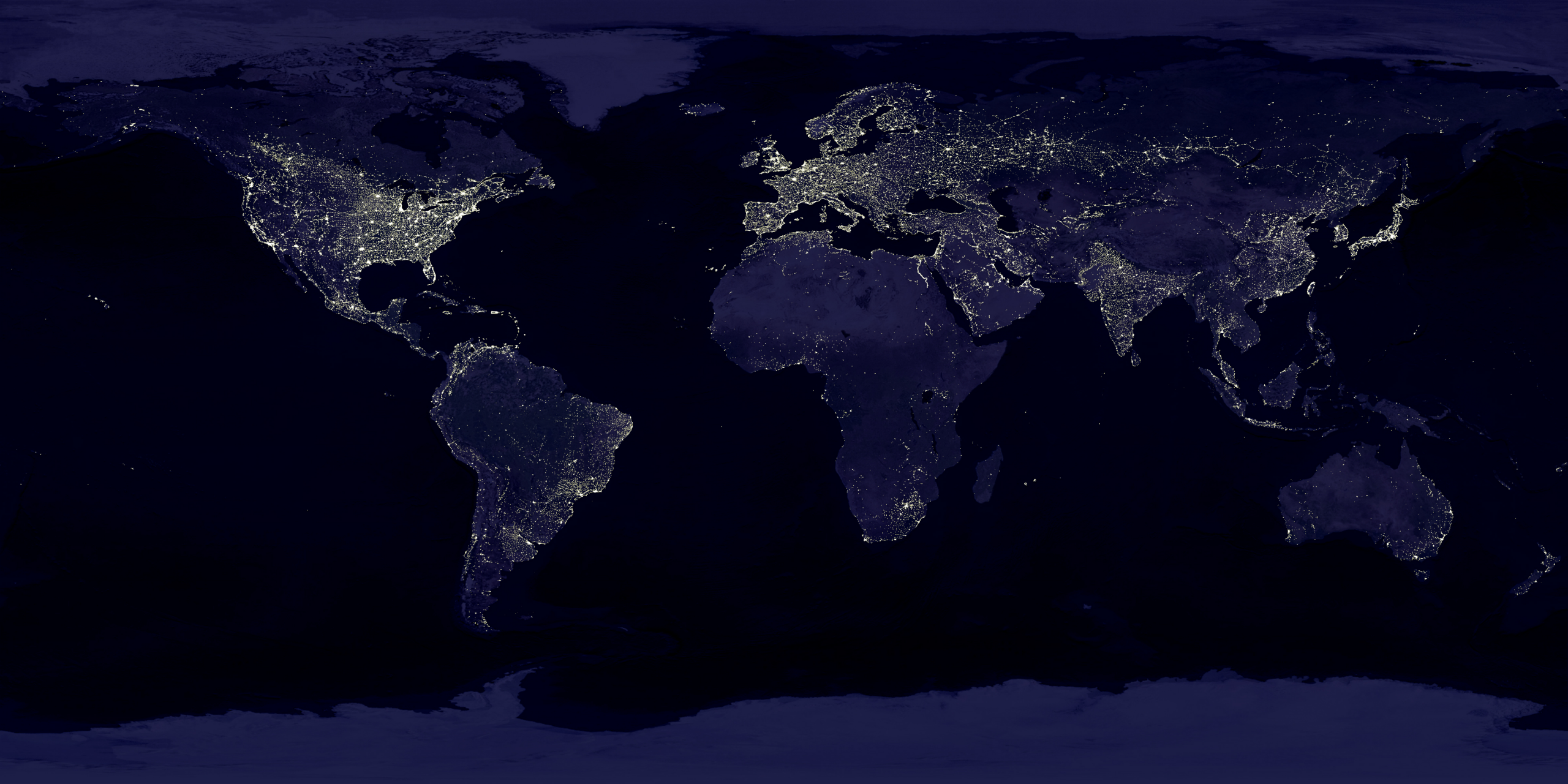
Image of the Earth at night. Only a portion of Earth's surface remains dark at night.

Night skies are obscured by artificial lights in many cities around the world. These lights are illuminated from buildings, roads and other human structures. When flying across the city, migratory birds could become attracted to artificial lights in the sky. These birds tend to follow light beams and fly continuously in circles, dying from exhaustion or predators as the result. Increased illumination due to artificial lighting could also disrupt foraging behavior of diurnal birds, making these species forage at night, instead of the day. The negative effects from artificial lights are particularly evident in bad weather and when stars are covered by clouds, because birds that migrate at night use light beams for navigation.

== Contributory factors ==
=== Deforestation ===
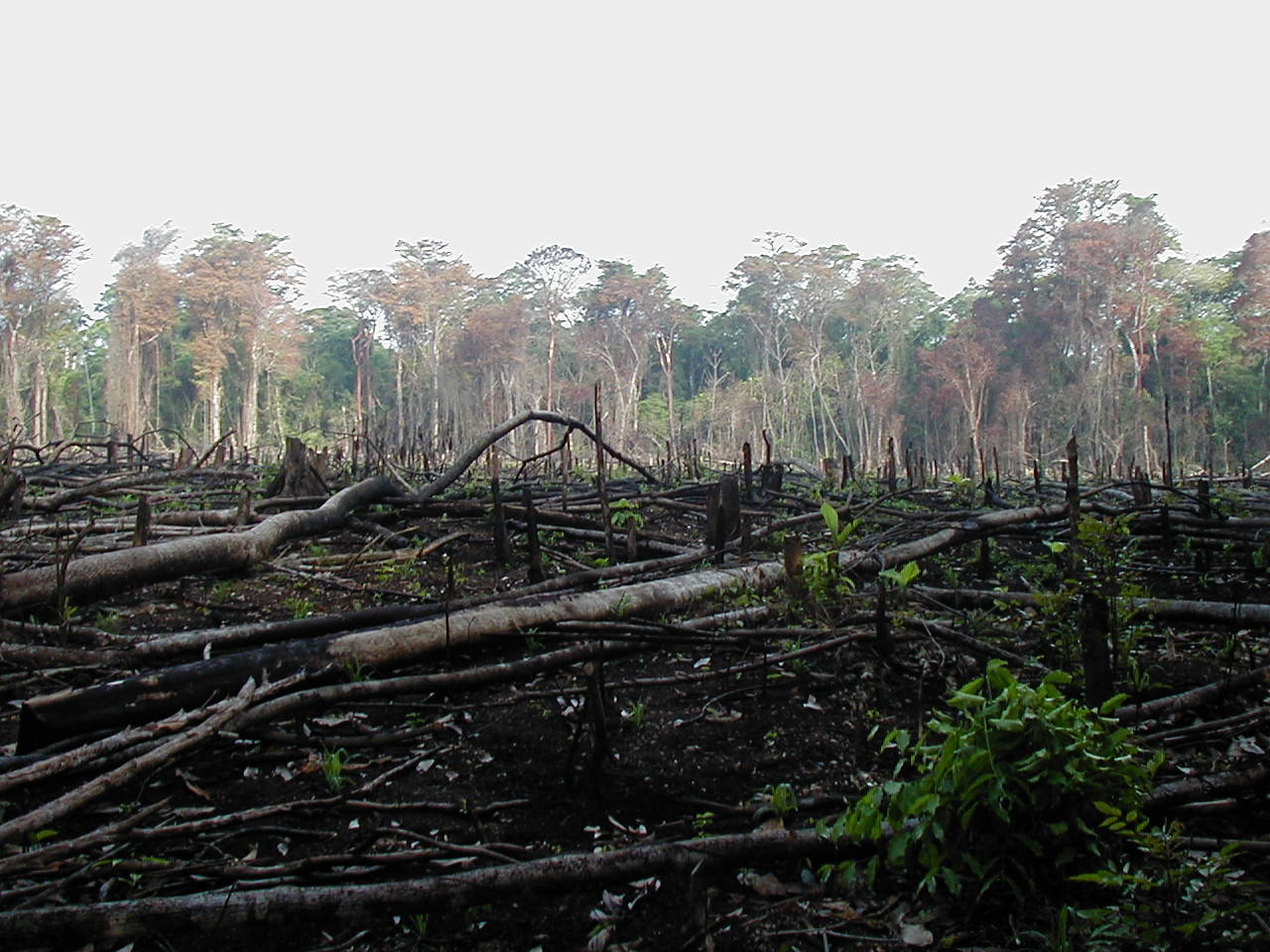
Forest burned for agriculture in Mexico

Forest fragmentation is one of the greatest perils to migratory birds. Fragmented areas tend to have more parasites, increased nest predation and lower habitat heterogeneity. Habitat loss also means that the region has lower carrying capacity which leads to increased intraspecific competition between territorial species. In 1989, John Rappole made early use of radio-tags to monitor the location of Wood Thrushes in Veracruz Mexico. Since the 1960s this region had lost over 50% of its forest cover. Rappole noticed that primary rainforests were occupied almost exclusively by older wood thrush. First year birds are smaller and inexperienced, thus they cannot compete with older birds and are forced to live along the forest edge. Younger birds often become wanderers and they are more likely to be eaten by hawks and other predators. These negative conditions in wintering grounds experienced by young and late arriving birds could potentially carry over to breeding habitats, altering population dynamics and lowering the fitness levels of effected bird species.

Deforestation leads to fragmented forest habitats and nest predators tend to be more abundant in these fragmented landscapes. If the fragmented area is long and narrow, it will have greater predation rates because it can easily be reached by nest predators from other areas. Compared to rural woodlots, nest predation rates were higher in suburban areas due higher densities of nest predators such as Blue Jay, Common Grackle, raccoons, dogs, cats and rats. Deforestation thus affects population cycles of birds by changing predator-prey relationships and making the birds more susceptible to predators.

Oil developments at the tar sands is one of the main causes of deforestation in Canada. Less than 14% of Alberta's boreal forest remains intact. Loss of Canadian boreal forest is a threat to migratory birds.

=== Climate change ===
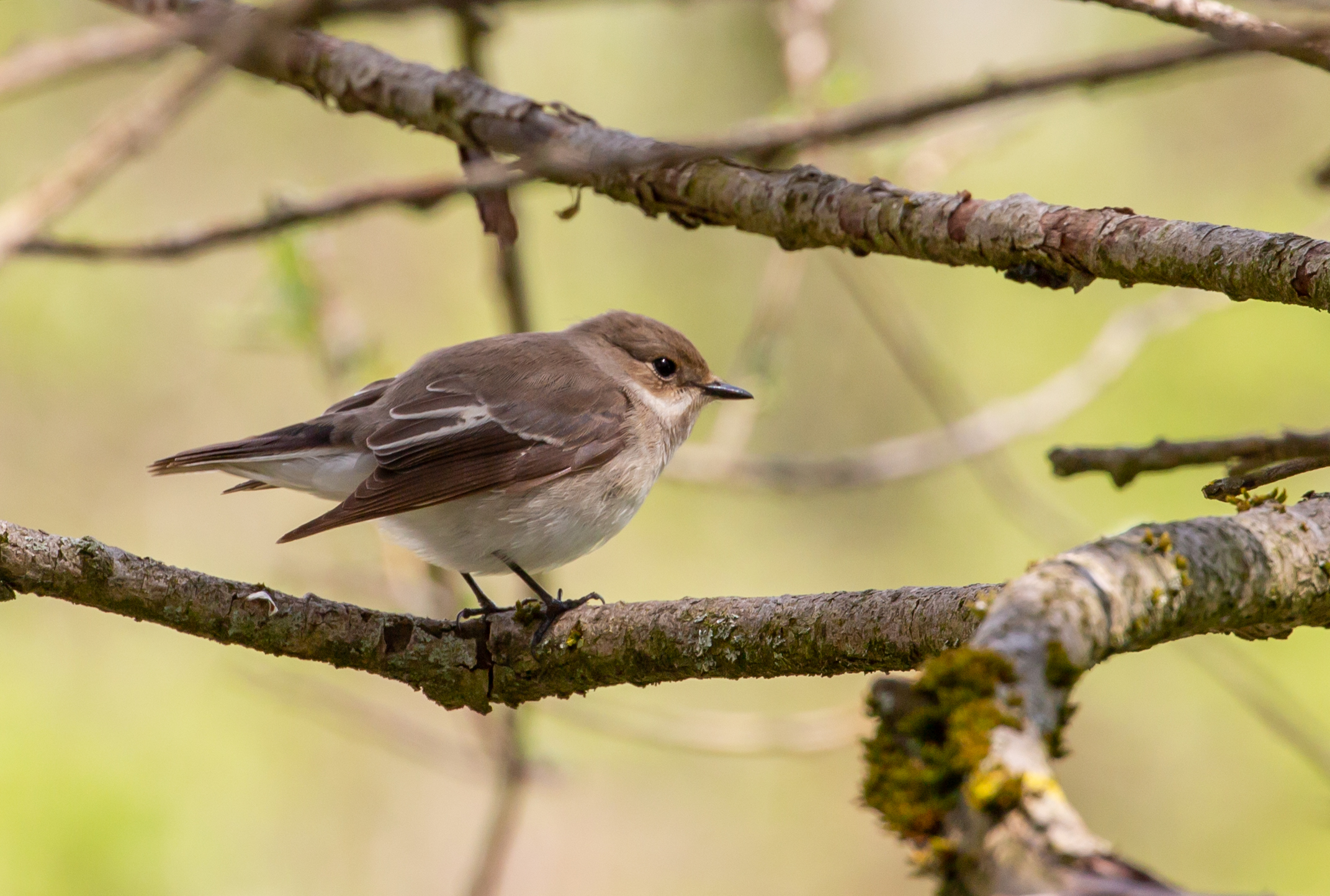
Pied flycatchers no longer arrive at breeding grounds at the optimal time to nest as a consequence of climate change.

Migratory birds are seriously affected by climate change when they can no longer assess changes in spring weather from their wintering grounds. Higher spring temperatures can lead to earlier increases in insect abundance, but many bird species are not able to advance their arrival dates. For example, pied flycatchers timed their egg hatch cycles with subsequent increases in food to raise as many young as possible. Spring migration based on day length had allowed flycatchers to arrive on time, and their egg laying times correlated with insect abundances. However, as a result of climate change, the flycatchers are now forced to lay eggs earlier, which leaves these birds not enough time to prepare their nests properly. Climate change poses a serious threat to long distance migrant birds because they arrive at inappropriate time to exploit environmental opportunities, and face higher competition with resident species. Birds such as the pied flycatcher can start nesting earlier, but their arrival time at the breeding grounds does not change because birds cannot remotely sense temperature changes on breeding grounds from their wintering grounds. The birds cannot depart their wintering grounds unless they have enough energy and fat reserves to support their migration journey, and since early arriving birds usually get the best resources, most species face intense competition for early arrival and early departure. For example, in American redstart, individuals with better phenotypic qualities arrive and mate first.

== See also ==
- Bird fallout
