= Season creep =

Phenomenon of seasons slowly changing their timing

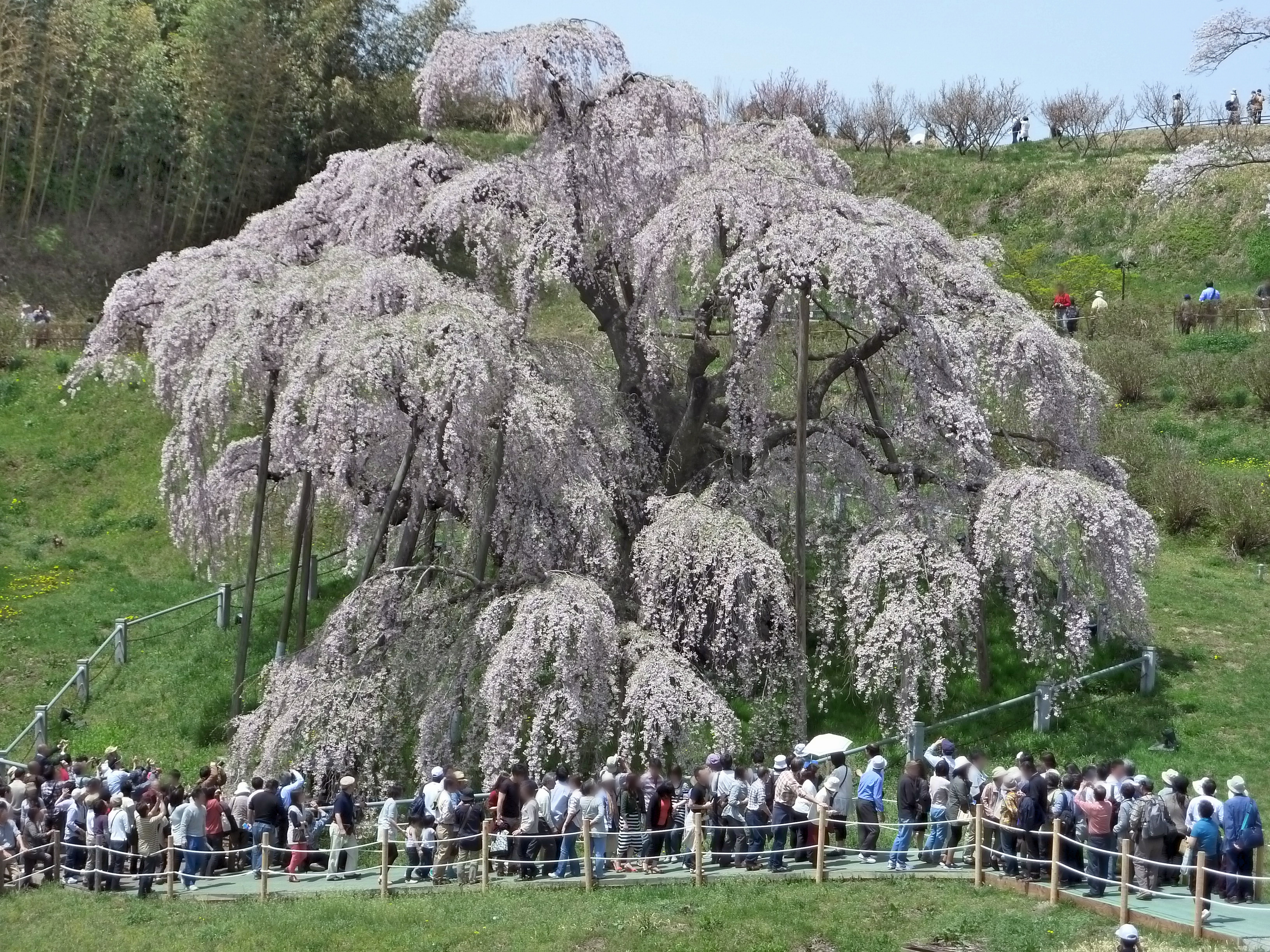
After a stable average for a thousand years, cherry blossoms in Japan have been emerging earlier since 1800 due to climate change

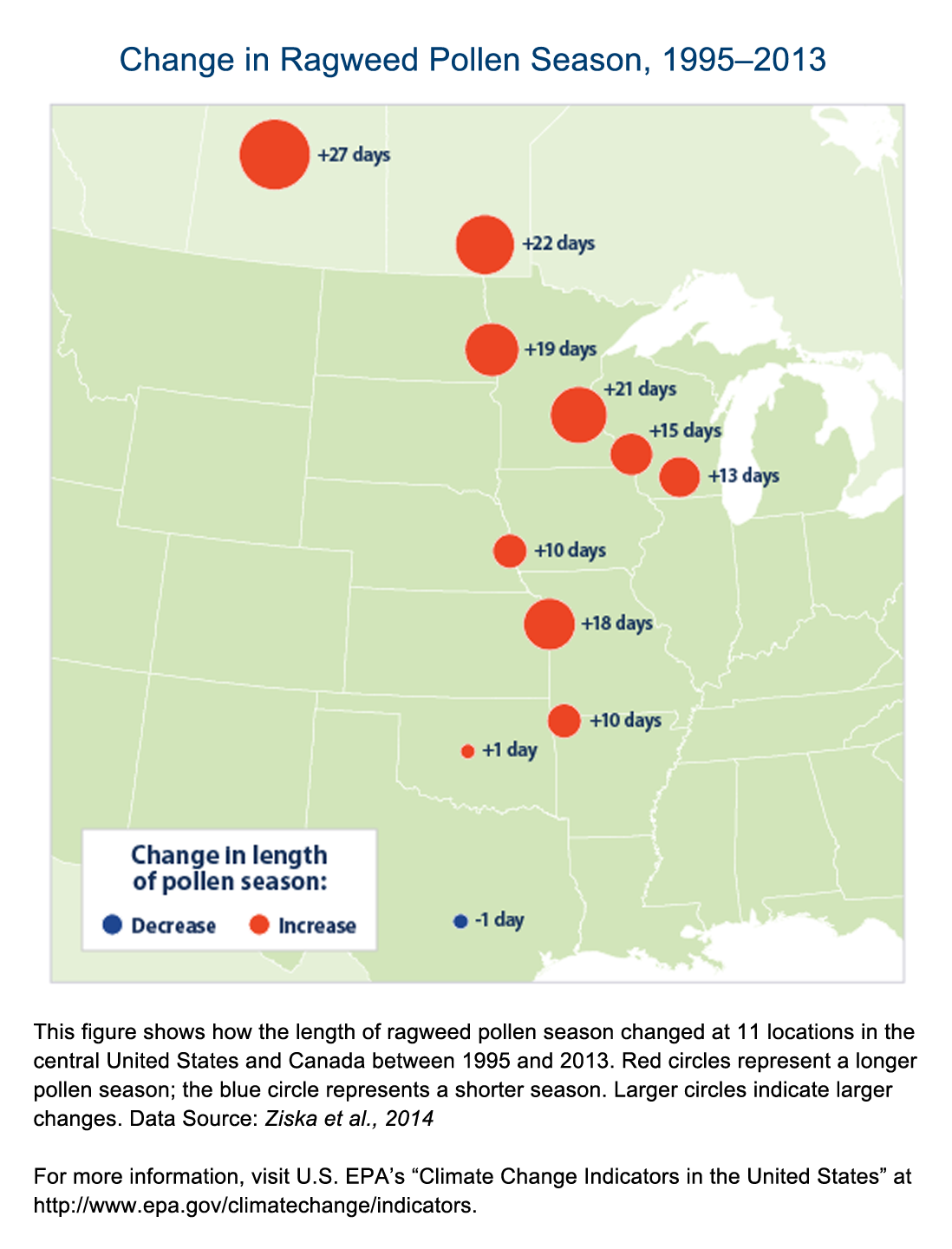
Changes in ragweed pollen season in the United States and Canada, 1995 to 2013. At a site in Saskatchewan, the season had increased in length by 27 days.

In phenology, season creep refers to observed changes in the timing of the seasons, such as earlier indications of spring widely observed in temperate areas across the Northern Hemisphere. Phenological records analyzed by climate scientists have shown significant temporal trends in the observed time of seasonal events, from the end of the 20th century and continuing into the 21st century. In Europe, season creep has been associated with the arrival of spring moving up by approximately one week in a recent 30-year period. Other studies have put the rate of season creep measured by plant phenology in the range of 2–3 days per decade advancement in spring, and 0.3–1.6 days per decade delay in autumn, over the past 30–80 years.

Observable changes in nature related to season creep include birds laying their eggs earlier and buds appearing on some trees in late winter. In addition to advanced budding, flowering trees have been blooming earlier, for example the culturally-important cherry blossoms in Japan, and Washington, D.C. Northern hardwood forests have been trending toward leafing out sooner, and retaining their green canopies longer. The agricultural growing season has also expanded by 10–20 days over the last few decades.

The effects of season creep have been noted by non-scientists as well, including gardeners who have advanced their spring planting times, and experimented with plantings of less hardy warmer climate varieties of non-native plants. While summer growing seasons are expanding, winters are getting warmer and shorter, resulting in reduced winter ice cover on bodies of water, earlier ice-out, earlier melt water flows, and earlier spring lake level peaks. Some spring events, or "phenophases", have become intermittent or unobservable; for example, bodies of water that once froze regularly most winters now freeze less frequently, and formerly migratory birds are now seen year-round in some areas.

== Relationship to global warming ==
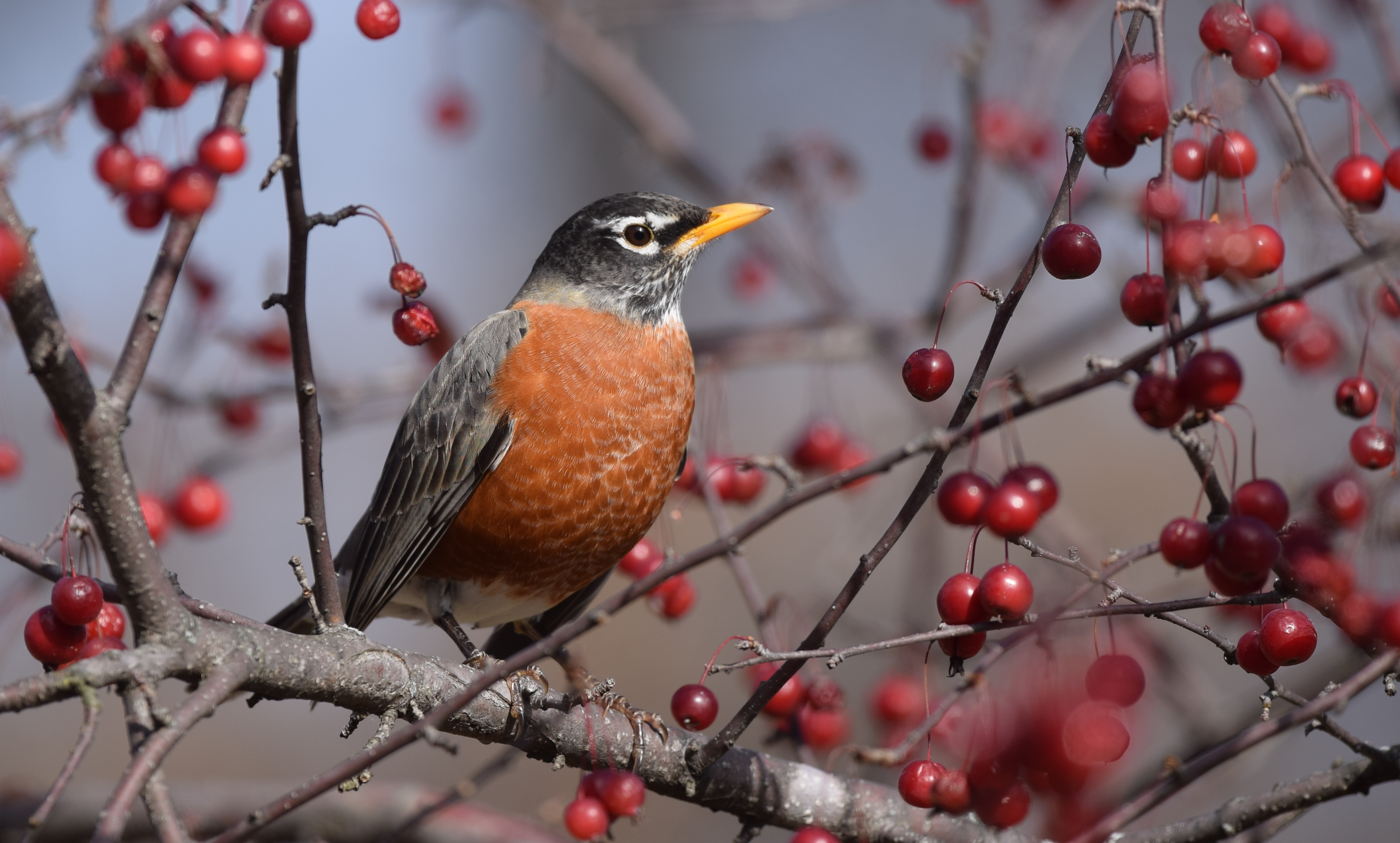
The American Robin has ceased to migrate in some areas

The full impact of global warming is forecast to happen in the future, but climate scientists have cited season creep as an easily observable effect of climate change that has already occurred and continues to occur. A large systematic phenological examination of data on 542 plant species in 21 European countries from 1971 to 2000 showed that 78% of all leafing, flowering, and fruiting records advanced while only 3% were significantly delayed, and these observations were consistent with measurements of observed warming. Similar changes in the phenology of plants and animals are occurring across marine, freshwater, and terrestrial groups studied, and these changes are also consistent with the expected impact of global warming.

While phenology fairly consistently points to an earlier spring across temperate regions of North America, a recent comprehensive study of the subarctic showed greater variability in the timing of green-up, with some areas advancing, and some having no discernible trend over a recent 44-year period. Another 40 year phenological study in China found greater warming over that period in the more northerly sites studied, with sites experiencing cooling mostly in the south, indicating that the temperature variation with latitude is decreasing there. This study also confirmed that season creep was correlated with warming, but the effect is non-linear—phenophases advanced less with greater warming, and retarded more with greater cooling.

Shorter winters and longer growing seasons may appear to be a benefit to society from global warming, but the effects of advanced phenophases may also have serious consequences for human populations. Modeling of snowmelt predicted that warming of 3 to 5 °C in the Western United States could cause snowmelt-driven runoff to occur as much as two months earlier, with profound effects on hydroelectricity, land use, agriculture, and water management. Since 1980, earlier snowmelt and associated warming has also been associated with an increase in length and severity of the wildfire season there.

Season creep may also have adverse effects on plant species as well. Earlier flowering could occur before pollinators such as honey bees become active, which would have negative consequences for pollination and reproduction. Shorter and warmer winters may affect other environmental adaptations including cold hardening of trees, which could result in frost damage during more severe winters.

== Etymology ==
Season creep was included in the 9th edition of the Collins English Dictionary published in London June 4, 2007. The term was popularized in the media after the report titled "Season Creep: How Global Warming Is Already Affecting The World Around Us" was published by the American environmental organization Clear the Air on March 21, 2006. In the "Season Creep" report, Jonathan Banks, Policy Director for Clear the Air, introduced the term as follows:

While to some, an early arrival of spring may sound good, an imbalance in the ecosystem can wreak havoc. Natural processes like flowers blooming, birds nesting, insects emerging, and ice melting are triggered in large part by temperature. As temperatures increase globally, the delicately balanced system begins to fall into ecological disarray. We call this season creep.

== See also ==
- Orbital forcing
- Climate change and birds
- Phenological mismatch
