= Bird fallout =

Blocking of migratory birds due to severe weather

Bird fallout or migration fallout is the result of severe weather preventing migratory birds from reaching their destination. This can occur while birds are traveling south or returning to their breeding grounds. Due to the distance travelled, birds will not have enough energy to continue flight when encountering high winds. This exhaustion results in many birds resting in one area. This may be very stressful on the birds and on the surrounding ecology. Bird fallout is not particularly common, as it stems from the chance event of severe winds found in inclement weather. Due to the rare occurrence of a migratory fallout, as well as the abundance of birds resting in a single location, it is a sought-after event for birders.

== Consequences ==
There can be some significant consequences due to birds encountering severe weather during their migratory flyway. Late arrival to their destination can lead to a delay in reproduction, or a higher mortality rate. Due to the large number of birds resting, a lack of shelter and food becomes a large concern for the survival and propagation to the wintering destination.

== Notable incidents ==
The most notable incident occurred on 25 April 2013, where 294 species of birds were recorded as a result of fallout at High Island, Texas caused by rain and high winds. Other incidents include hurricanes during the migratory period.

== See also ==
- Stressor
- Bird migration
- Flyway
