= Liebermann =

Lieberman and Liebermann are names deriving from Lieb, a German and Jewish (Ashkenazic) nickname for a person from the German lieb or Yiddish lib, meaning 'dear, beloved'. Many Lieberman families originally spelled the name in Hebrew or Cyrillic characters, so variations in the spelling occurred during transliteration to the Latin alphabet.

== Liebermann ==
- Alexander Liebermann (born 1989), German-French classical composer
- Benjamin Liebermann, German manufacturer
- Bruno Franz Leopold Liebermann (1759–1844), German Catholic theologian
- Carl Theodore Liebermann (1842–1914), German chemist
- Charles H. Liebermann, Russian-American physician
- Eliezer Dob Liebermann, Russian-Jewish writer
- Felix Liebermann, historian (brother to Max Liebermann)
- Lowell Liebermann, composer
- Max Liebermann, painter
- Oren Liebermann, American-Israeli journalist
- Rolf Liebermann (1910–1999), Swiss composer and opera director

== Lieberman ==
- Alan Lieberman, MAS, MA, NRP (ret), , consultant in the field of Emergency Management, Disaster Preparedness/Medicine, former paramedic and law enforcement officer
- Avigdor Lieberman, Moldavian-born Israeli politician, former Minister of Foreign affairs
- Daniel Lieberman, paleoanthropologist
- Evelyn S. Lieberman, American public official
- Fredric Lieberman, an American ethnomusicologist, composer, music professor, and author
- Hadassah Lieberman, wife of Joe Lieberman
- Hendel Lieberman, Russian-American artist
- Herman Lieberman, Polish lawyer and Socialist politician
- James S. Lieberman, MD (1938 - 2006), American physician, Chairman and physiatrist-in-chief of the Department of Rehabilitation for New York-Presbyterian at both Columbia University Medical Center and Weill Cornell Medical Center, he held joint academic appointments as the H.K. Corning Professor of Rehabilitation Medicine Research, senior associate dean for clinical services and associate vice president for health sciences at Columbia University College of Physicians and Surgeons, and professor of rehabilitation medicine at Weill Cornell Medical College.
- Jeff Lieberman (born 1947), American filmmaker
- Jeffrey Lieberman, American psychiatrist, Chairman, Department of Psychiatry, Columbia University
- Joe Lieberman, US Senator from Connecticut, husband of Hadassah Lieberman
- Judith Lieberman, educator and the wife of Saul Lieberman
- Lori Lieberman, American singer-songwriter
- Lou Lieberman, Australian politician
- Louise Lieberman (born 1977), American soccer coach and former player
- Matthew Lieberman, professor of social cognitive neuroscience
- Nancy Lieberman (born 1958), American basketball player
- Nick Lieberman, American filmmaker
- Philip Lieberman, linguist
- Robert Lieberman, film and television director
- Robert C. Lieberman, American political scientist
- Robert H. Lieberman, scientist, educator, novelist and movie director
- Saul Lieberman, rabbi and scholar and the husband of Judith Lieberman
- Simcha Lieberman (1926–2009), Israeli Talmud scholar
- Syd Lieberman, storyteller
- Zvi Lieberman, Hebrew children's book author

== Fictional characters ==
- Claire Lieberman, the female lead in Young Indiana Jones and the Hollywood Follies

== See also ==
- The Lieberman clause

Related surnames

- Libermann
- Liebmann, Liebman, Libman
