= History of red =

History of the color Red

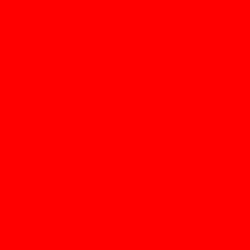
Red

The color red has historically been derived from several materials, including iron, mercury, and lead (however mercury and lead paints were toxic). The color Red was used in several applications by humans, which early on included use in calligraphy and writing beginning in 8th century China as a way to mark underlines and draw attention to portions of a script. The color red also included a wide variety of different cultural meanings. Sometimes the color was a color of romance, while in other cases being the color of violence. In short, different cultures and regions applied, and still do apply, vastly different cultural meanings to the color of red, and its use varies wildly, as well as its meaning.

== Prehistory ==
Inside cave 13B at Pinnacle Point, an archeological site found on the coast of South Africa, paleoanthropologists in 2000 found evidence that, between 170,000 and 40,000 years ago, Late Stone Age people were scraping and grinding ochre, a clay colored red by iron oxide, probably with the intention of using it to color their bodies.

Red hematite powder was also found scattered around the remains at a grave site in a Zhoukoudian cave complex near Beijing. The site has evidence of habitation as early as 700,000 years ago. The hematite might have been used to symbolize blood in an offering to the dead.

Red, black and white were the first colors used by artists in the Upper Paleolithic age, probably because natural pigments such as red ochre and iron oxide were readily available where early people lived. Madder, a plant whose root could be made into a red dye, grew widely in Europe, Africa and Asia. The cave of Altamira in Spain has a painting of a bison colored with red ochre that dates to between 15,000 and 16,500 BC.

A red dye called Kermes was made beginning in the Neolithic Period by drying and then crushing the bodies of the females of a tiny scale insect in the genus Kermes, primarily Kermes vermilio. The insects live on the sap of certain trees, especially Kermes oak trees near the Mediterranean region. Jars of kermes have been found in a Neolithic cave-burial at Adaoutse, Bouches-du-Rhône. Kermes from oak trees was later used by Romans, who imported it from Spain. A different variety of dye was made from Porphyrophora hamelii (Armenian cochineal) scale insects that lived on the roots and stems of certain herbs. It was mentioned in texts as early as the 8th century BC, and it was used by the ancient Assyrians and Persians.

Kermes is also mentioned in the Bible. In the Book of Exodus, God instructs Moses to have the Israelites bring him an offering including cloth "of blue, and purple, and scarlet." The term used for scarlet in the 4th-century Latin Vulgate version of the Bible passage is coccumque bis tinctum, meaning "colored twice with coccus." Coccus, from the ancient Greek Kokkos, means a tiny grain and is the term that was used in ancient times for the Kermes vermilio insect used to make the Kermes dye. This was also the origin of the expression "dyed in the grain."

== Ancient history ==
In ancient Egypt, red was associated with life, health, and victory. Egyptians would color themselves with red ochre during celebrations. Egyptian women used red ochre as a cosmetic to redden cheeks and lips and also used henna to color their hair and paint their nails.

But, like many colors, it also had a negative association, with heat, destruction and evil. A prayer to god Isis states: "Oh Isis, protect me from all things evil and red." The ancient Egyptians began manufacturing pigments in about 4000 BC. Red ochre was widely used as a pigment for wall paintings, particularly as the skin color of men. An ivory painter's palette found inside the tomb of King Tutankhamun had small compartments with pigments of red ochre and five other colors. The Egyptians used the root of the rubia, or madder plant, to make a dye, later known as alizarin, and also used it as a pigment, which became known as madder lake, alizarin or alizarin crimson.

In Ancient China, artisans were making red and black painted pottery as early as the Yangshao Culture period (5000–3000 BC). A red-painted wooden bowl was found at a Neolithic site in Yuyao, Zhejiang. Other red-painted ceremonial objects have been found at other sites dating to the Spring and Autumn period (770–221 BC).

During the Han dynasty (200 BC–200 AD) Chinese craftsmen made a red pigment, lead tetroxide, which they called ch-ien tan, by heating lead white pigment. Like the Egyptians, they made a red dye from the madder plant to color silk fabric for gowns and used pigments colored with madder to make red lacquerware.

Red lead or Lead tetroxide pigment was widely used as the red in Persian and Indian miniature paintings as well as in European art, where it was called minium.

In India, the rubia plant has been used to make dye since ancient times. A piece of cotton dyed with rubia dated to the third millennium BC was found at an archaeological site at Mohenjo-daro. It has been used by Indian monks and hermits for centuries to dye their robes.

The early inhabitants of America had their own vivid crimson dye, made from the cochineal, an insect of the same family as the Kermes of Europe and the Middle East, which feeds on the Opuntia, or prickly pear cactus plant. Red-dyed textiles from the Paracas culture (800–100 BC) have been found in tombs in Peru.

Red also featured in the burials of royalty in the Maya city-states. In the Tomb of the Red Queen inside Temple XIII in the ruined Maya city of Palenque (600–700 AD), the skeleton and ceremonial items of a noble woman were completely covered with bright red powder made from cinnabar.

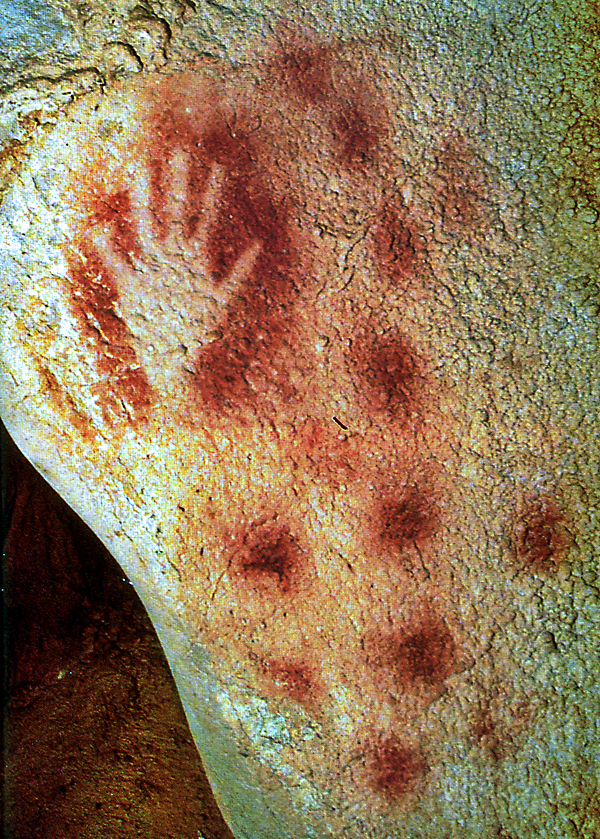
Image of a human hand created with red ochre in Pech Merle cave, France (Gravettian era, 25,000 BC).

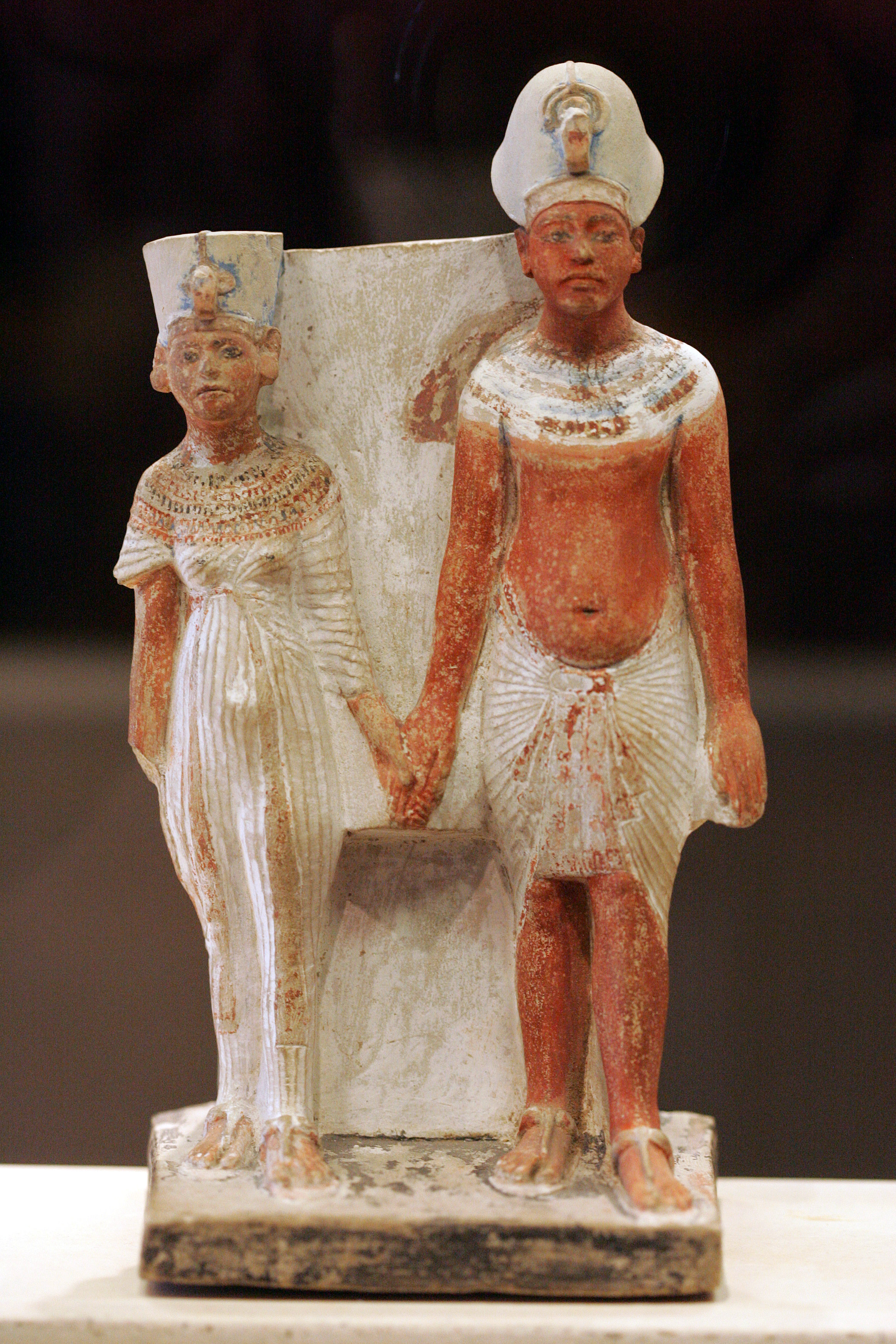
Painted statues of the ruler Akhenaten and Queen Nefertiti (1345 BC)

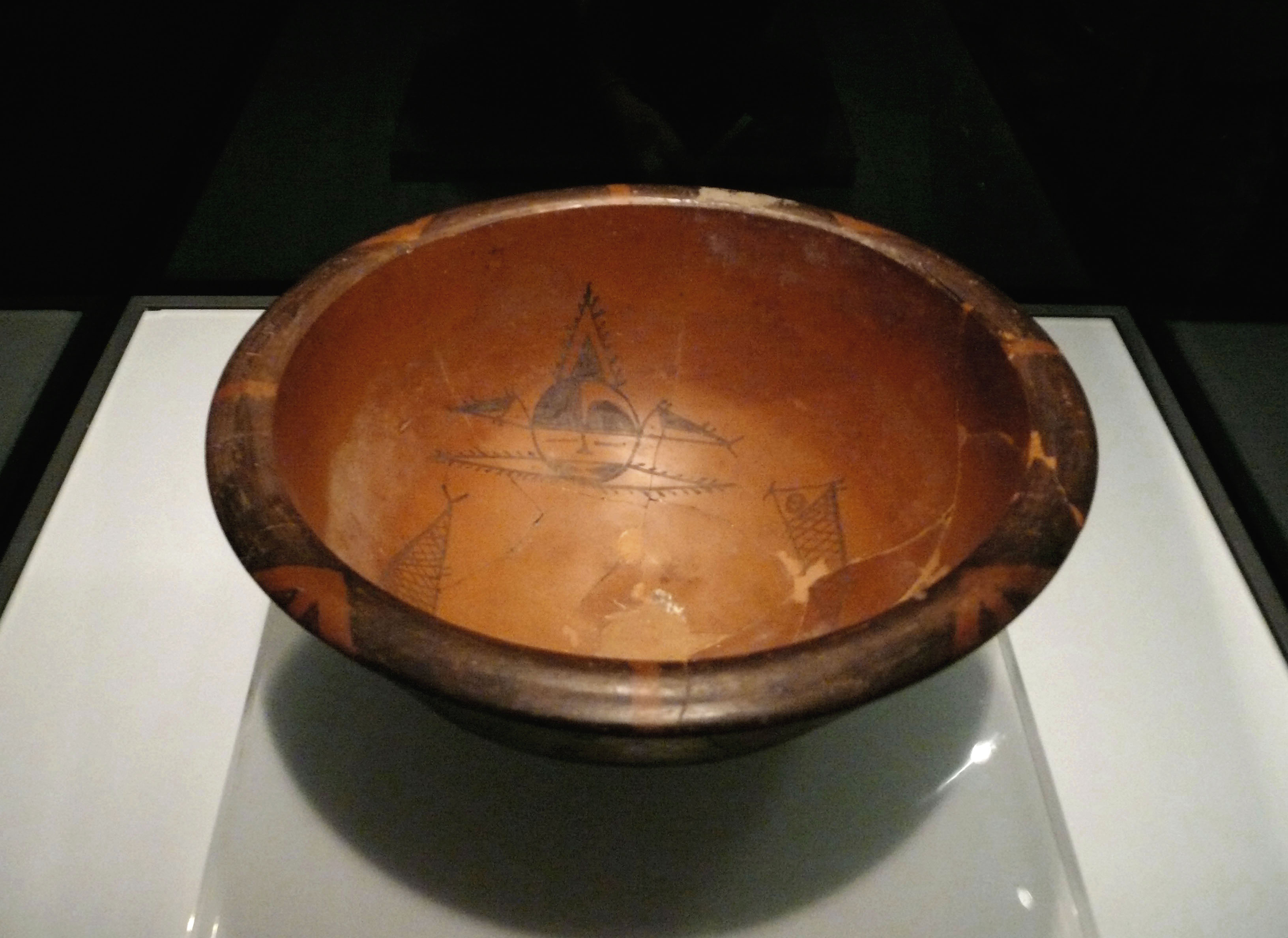
Painted red and black bowl from the Yangshao culture period in China (4500 BC), in the National Museum of Beijing

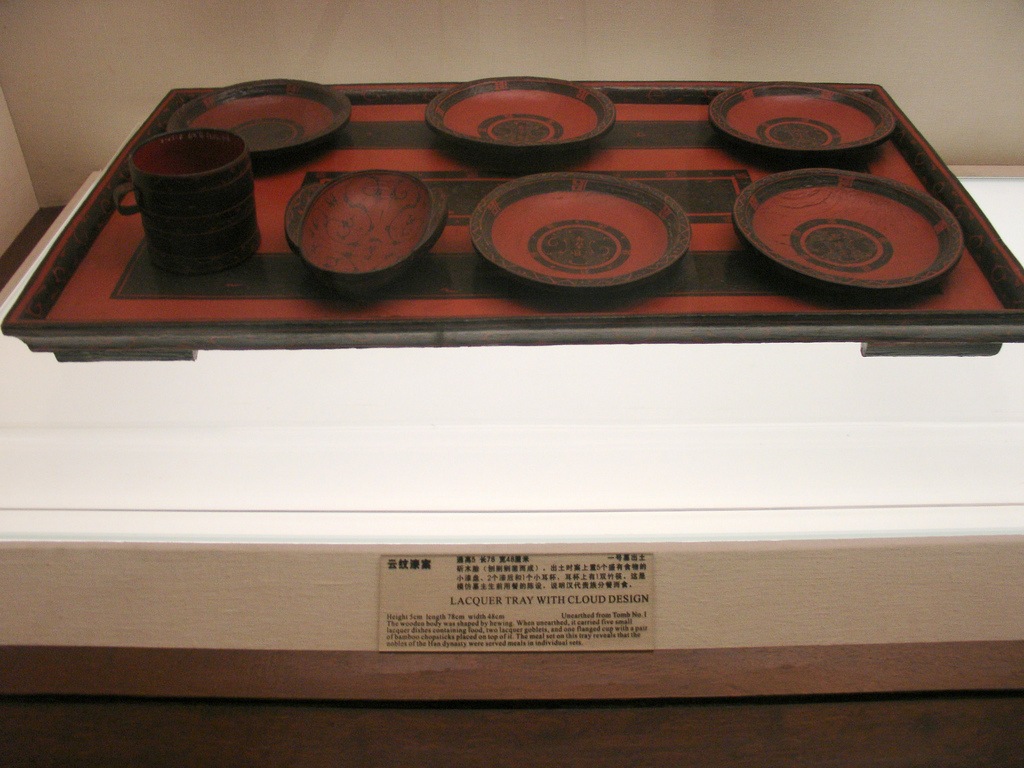
Chinese lacquerware from the Han dynasty (200 BC–200 AD)

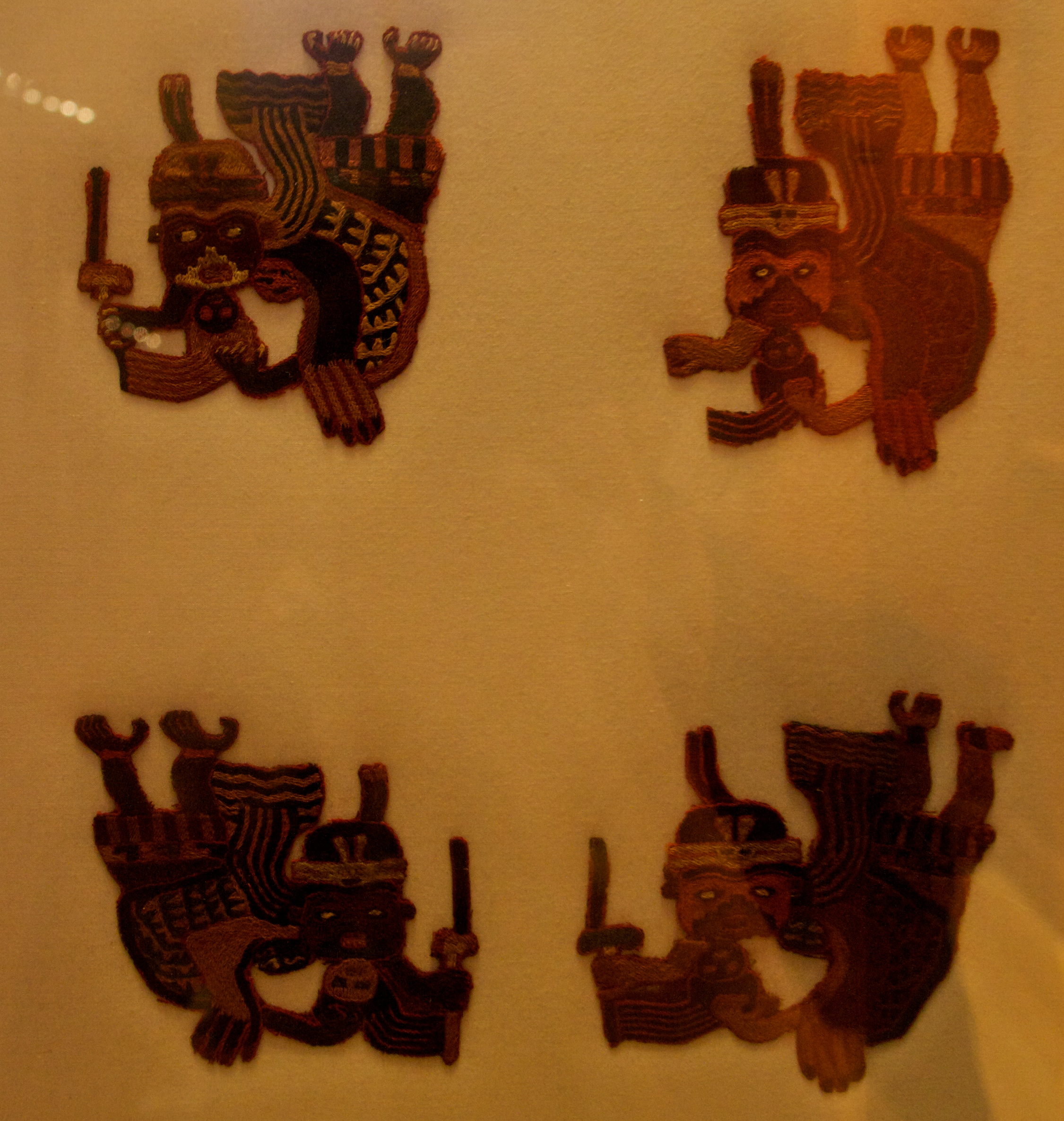
Textiles dyed red from the Paracas culture of Peru (about 200 BC), in the British Museum

In ancient Greece and the Minoan civilization of ancient Crete, red was widely used in murals and in the polychrome decoration of temples and palaces. The Greeks began using red lead as a pigment.

Romans wore togas with red stripes on holidays, and the bride at a wedding wore a red shawl, called a flammeum. Red was used to color statues and the skin of gladiators. Red was also the color associated with army; Roman soldiers wore red tunics, and officers wore a cloak called a paludamentum which, depending upon the quality of the dye, could be crimson, scarlet or purple. In Roman mythology red is associated with the god of war, Mars. The vexilloid of the Roman Empire had a red background with the letters SPQR in gold. A Roman general receiving a triumph had his entire body painted red in honor of his achievement.

The Romans liked bright colors, and many Roman villas were decorated with vivid red murals. The pigment used for many of the murals was called vermilion, and it came from the mineral cinnabar, a common ore of mercury. It was one of the finest reds of ancient times – the paintings have retained their brightness for more than twenty centuries. The source of cinnabar for the Romans was a group of mines near Almadén, southwest of Madrid, in Spain. Working in the mines was extremely dangerous, since mercury is highly toxic; the miners were slaves or prisoners, and being sent to the cinnabar mines was a virtual death sentence.

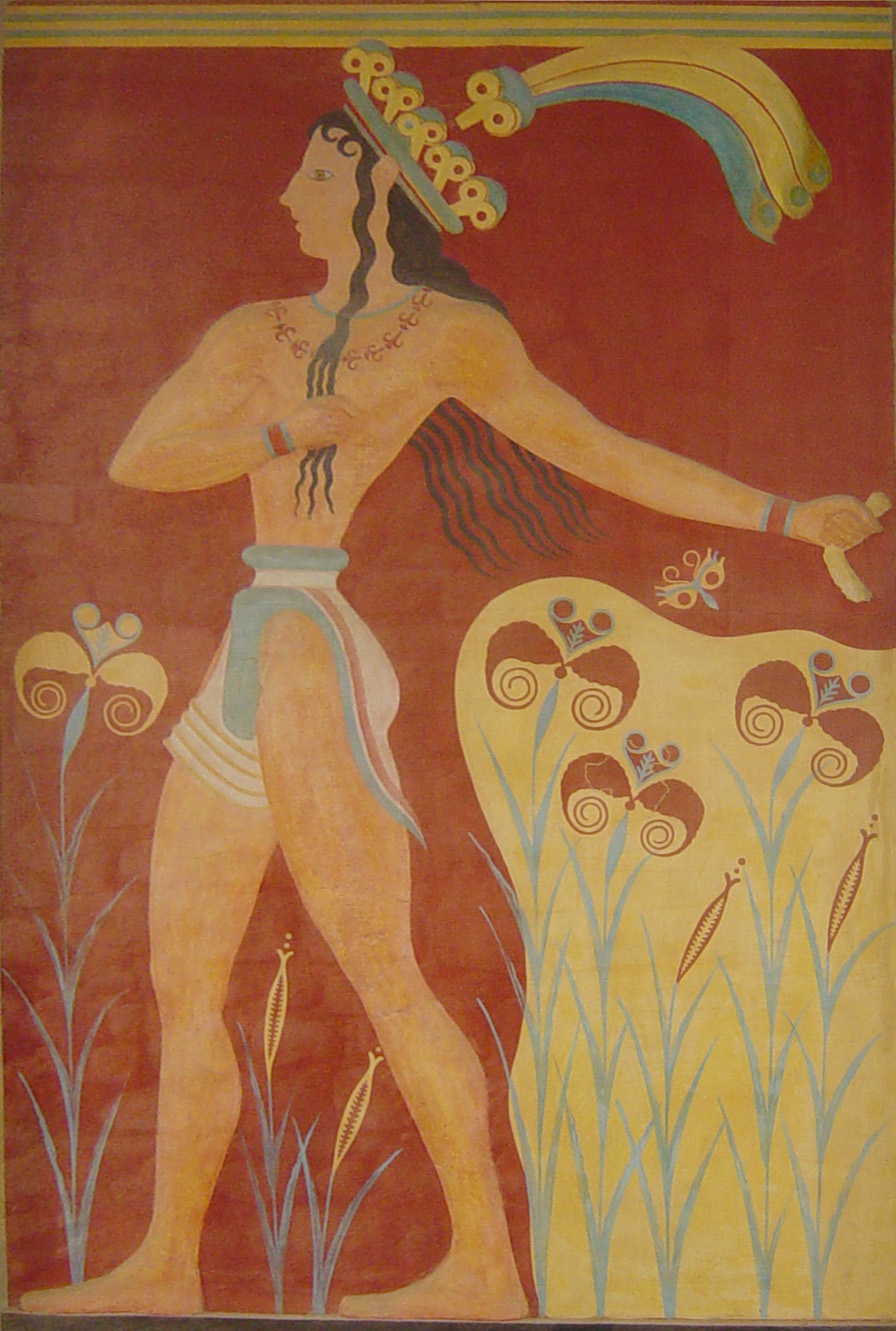
A restored mural, called The Prince of Lilies, from the Bronze Age Palace of Minos at Knossos on Crete

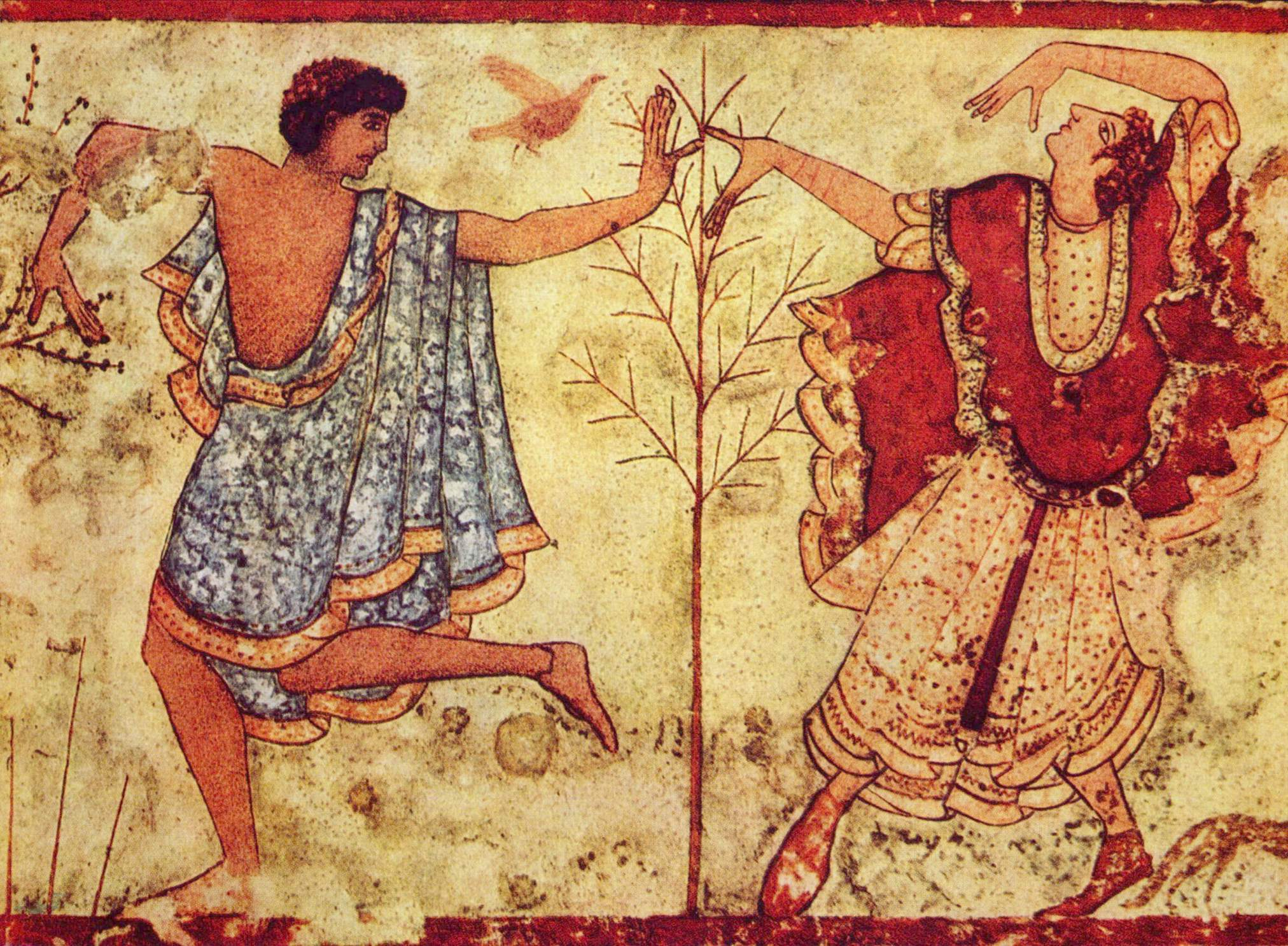
Etruscan dancers in the Tomb of the Triclinium (470 BC)

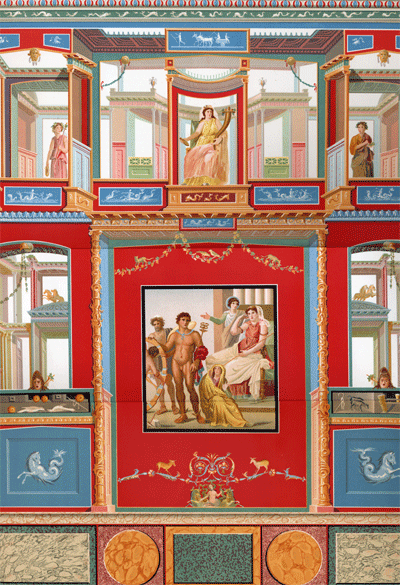
A fresco in the House of the Vettii in Pompeii, from about 62 AD. It was buried by the eruption of Vesuvius in 79 AD and preserved.

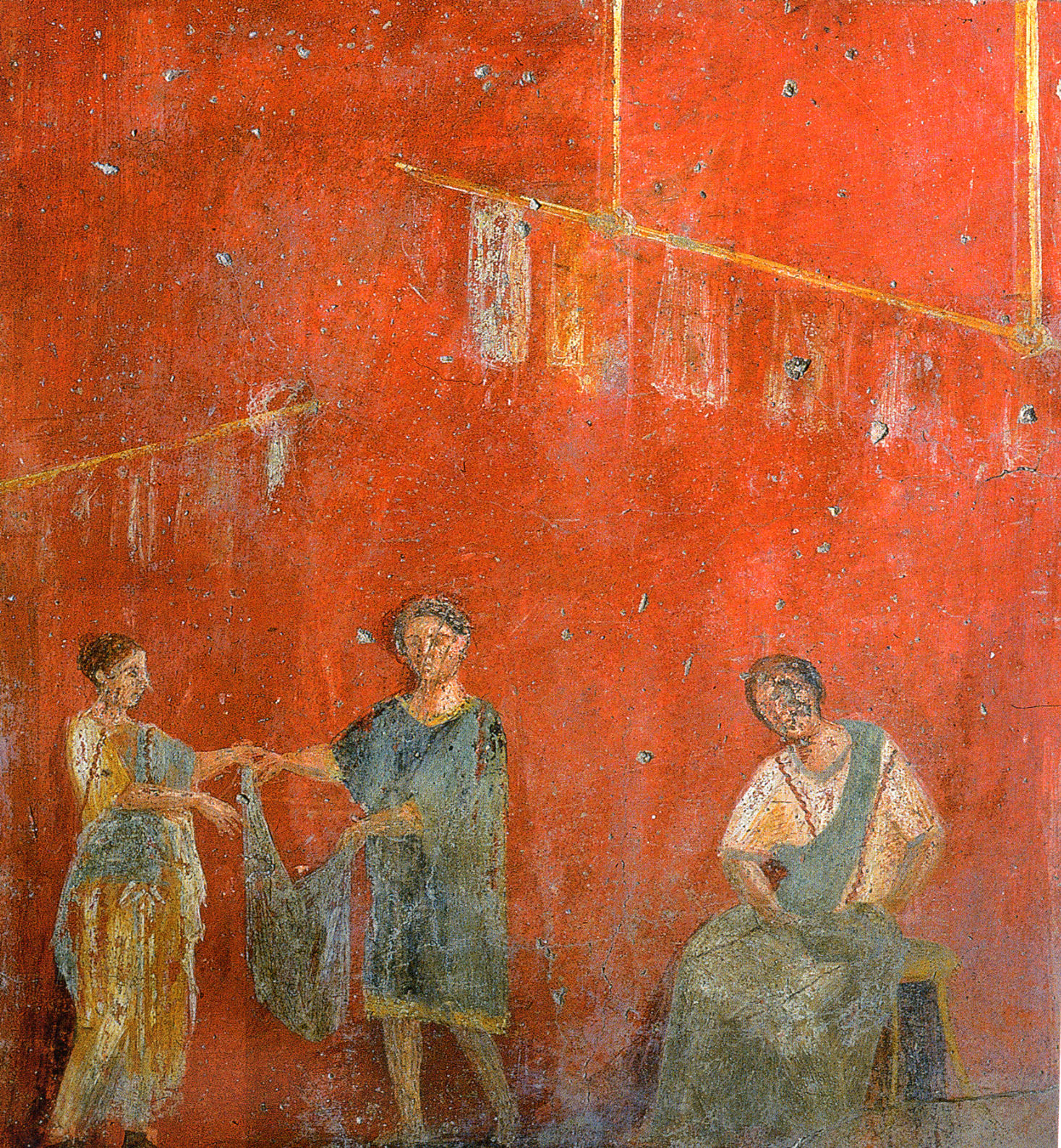
Roman wall painting showing a dye shop, Pompeii (40 BC). Dyed fabrics have been hung up to dry.

== Postclassical history ==
=== In Europe ===
After the fall of the Western Roman Empire, red was adopted as a color of majesty and authority by the Byzantine Empire, the princes of Europe, and the Roman Catholic Church. It also played an important part in the rituals of the Catholic Church, symbolizing the blood of Christ and the Christian martyrs.

Red was the color of the banner of the Byzantine emperors. In Western Europe, Emperor Charlemagne painted his palace red as a very visible symbol of his authority, and wore red shoes at his coronation. Kings, princes and, beginning in 1295, Roman Catholic cardinals began to wear red colored habitus. When Abbe Suger rebuilt Saint Denis Basilica outside Paris in the early 12th century, he added stained glass windows colored blue cobalt glass and red glass tinted with copper. Together they flooded the basilica with a mystical light. Soon stained glass windows were being added to cathedrals all across France, England and Germany. In medieval painting red was used to attract attention to the most important figures; both Christ and the Virgin Mary were commonly painted wearing red mantles.

Red clothing was a sign of status and wealth. It was worn not only by cardinals and princes, but also by merchants, artisans and townspeople, particularly on holidays or special occasions. Red dye for the clothing of ordinary people was made from the roots of the rubia tinctorum, the madder plant. This color leaned toward brick-red, and faded easily in the sun or during washing. The wealthy and aristocrats wore scarlet clothing dyed with kermes, or carmine, made from the carminic acid in tiny female scale insects, which lived on the leaves of oak trees in Eastern Europe and around the Mediterranean. The insects were gathered, dried, crushed, and boiled with different ingredients in a long and complicated process, which produced a brilliant scarlet.

Brazilin was another popular red dye in the Middle Ages. It came from the sapanwood tree, which grew in India, Malaysia and Sri Lanka. A similar tree, brazilwood, grew on the coast of South America. The red wood was ground into sawdust and mixed with an alkaline solution to make dye and pigment. It became one of the most profitable exports from the New World, and gave its name to the nation of Brazil.

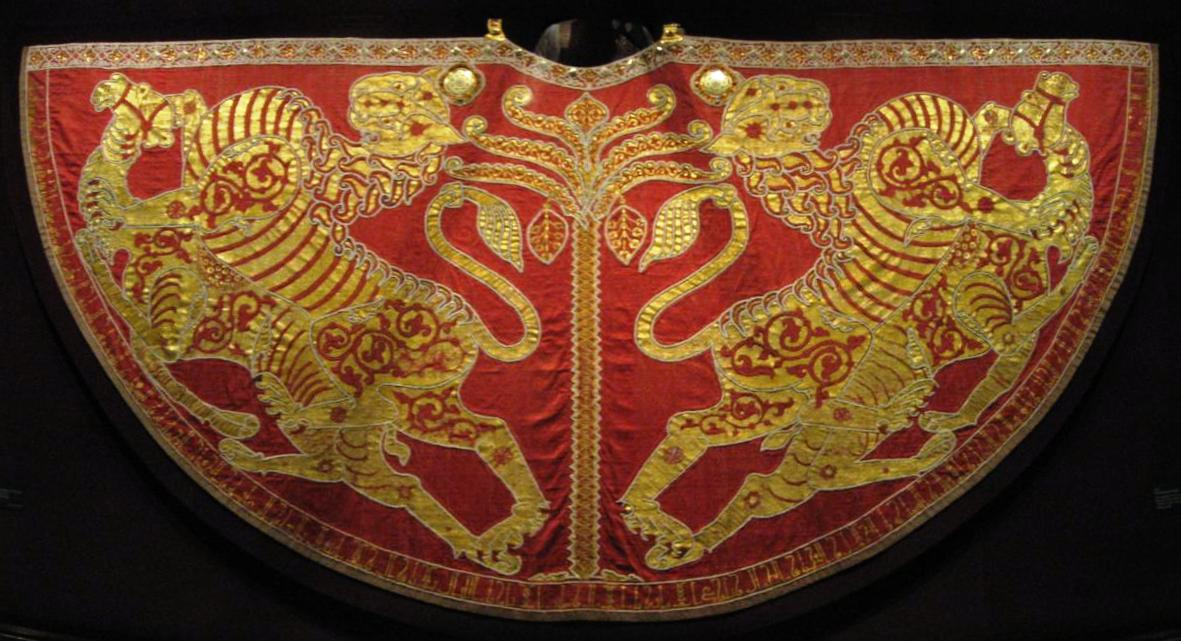
The crimson coronation mantle of Roger II of Sicily (1133–34), dyed with Kermes, the most prestigious red of the Middle Ages

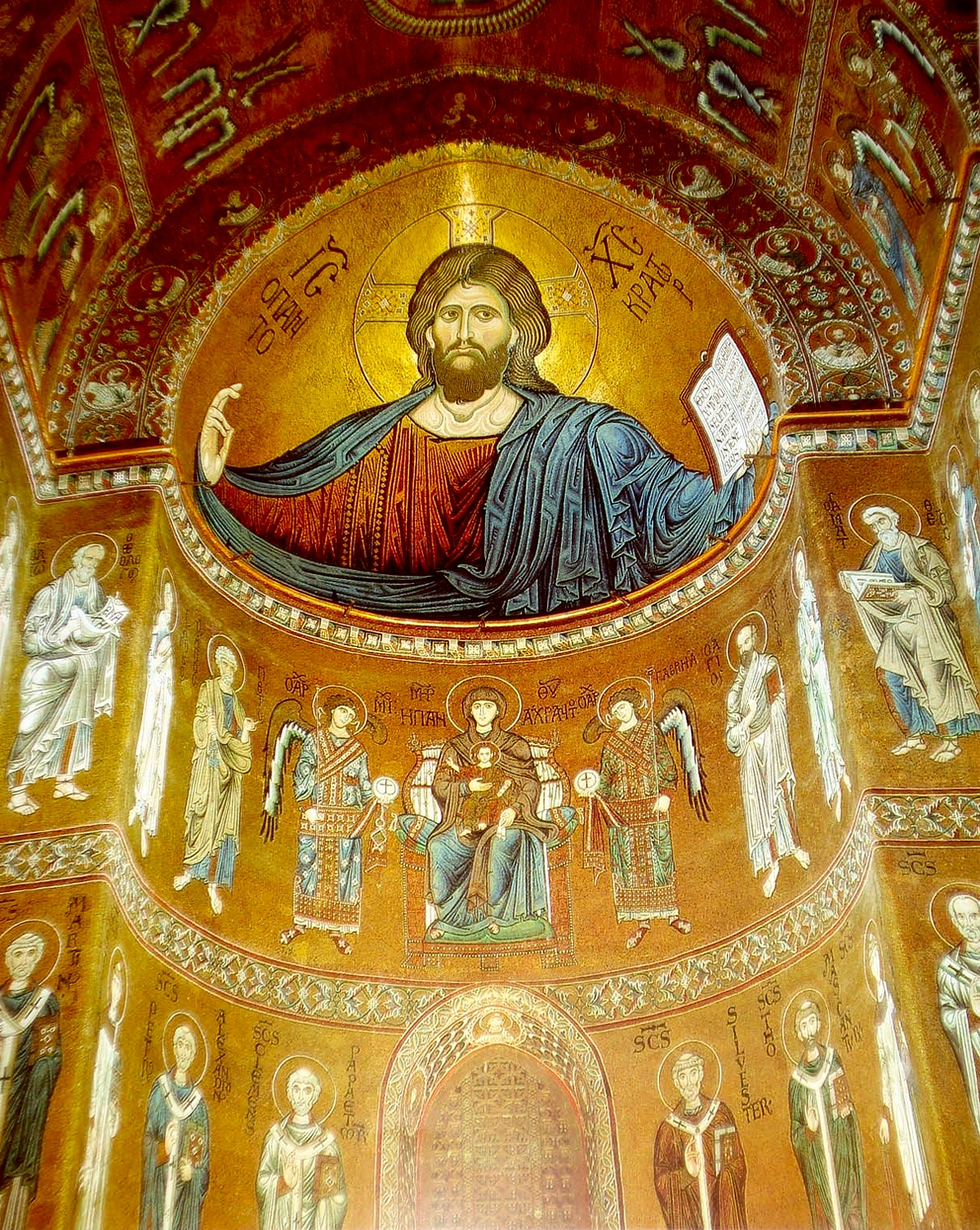
Interior of a Byzantine church, the Cathedral of Monreale in Sicily, with a mosaic portrait of Christ dressed in red (12th century)

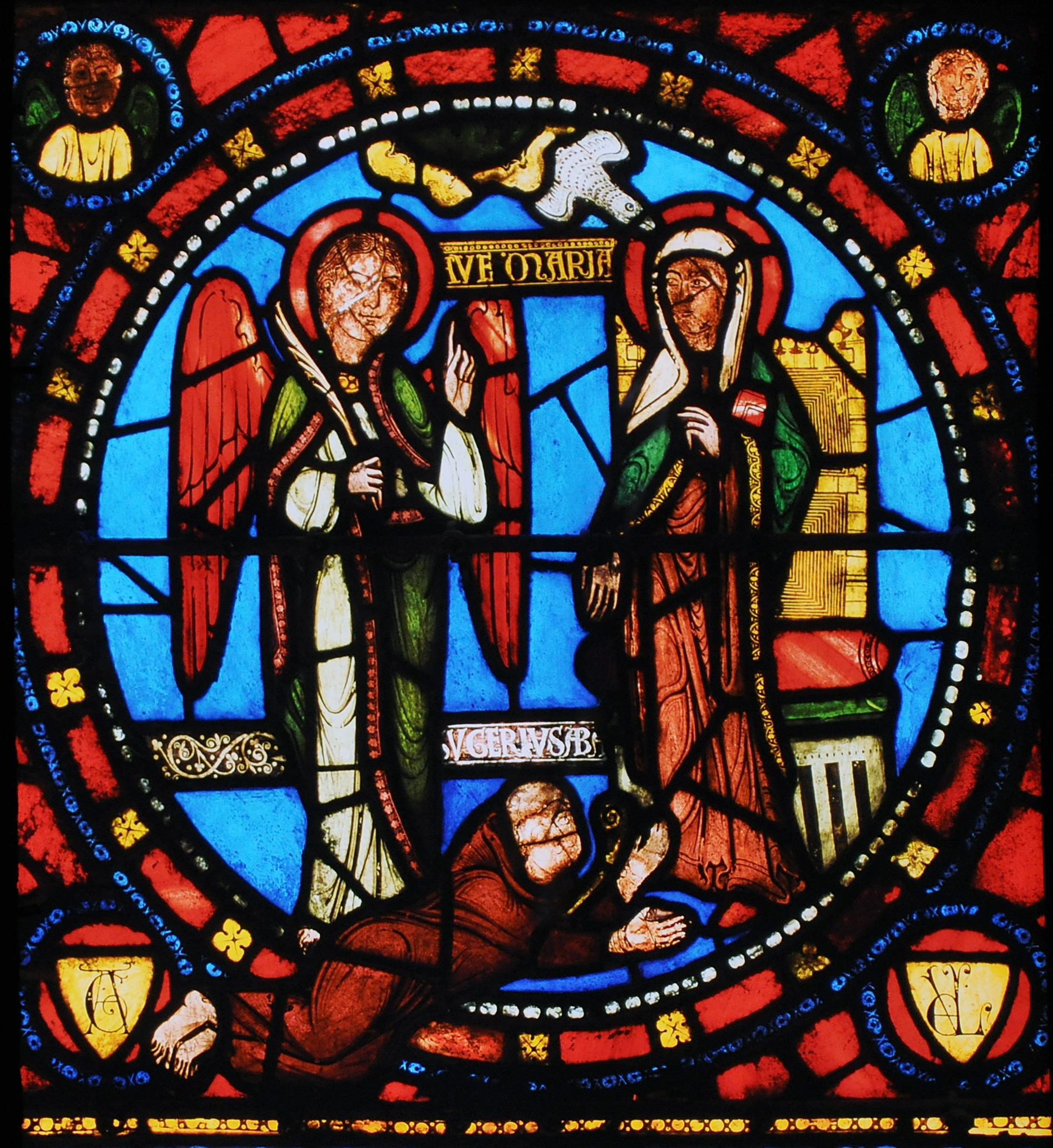
The Annunciation scene in stained glass, from the Saint Denis Basilica (early 12th century). Abbe Suger himself, the builder of the church, is pictured at the feet of the Virgin Mary, at right. She wears red with a green cloak.

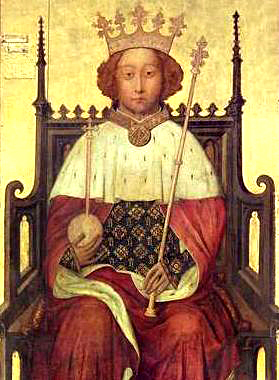
King Richard II of England (1390s) dressed in red

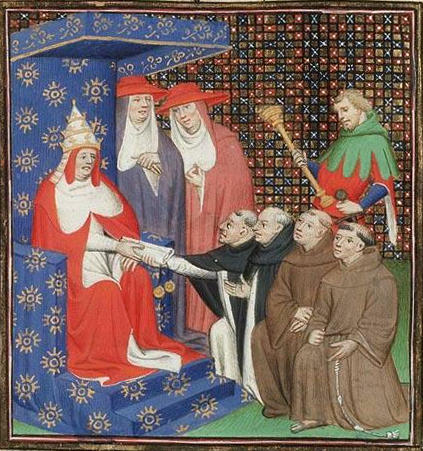
Pope Innocent IV (1400–1410) dressed in red, the symbol of the blood of Christ

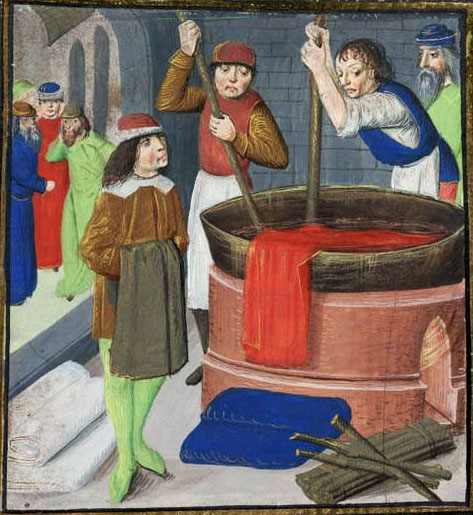
Dyeing wool, England (1482), from the British Museum

=== In Asia ===
Red has been an important color in Chinese culture, religion, industry, fashion and court ritual since ancient times. Silk was woven and dyed as early as the Han dynasty (25–220 BC). China had a monopoly on the manufacture of silk until the 6th century AD, when it was introduced into the Byzantine Empire. In the 12th century, it was introduced into Europe.

At the time of the Han dynasty, Chinese red was a light red, but during the Tang dynasty new dyes and pigments were discovered. The Chinese used several different plants to make red dyes, including the flowers of the safflower (Carthamus tinctorius), the thorns and stems of a variety of sorghum plant called Kao-liang, and the wood of the sappanwood tree. For pigments, they used cinnabar, which produced the famous vermillion or "Chinese red" of Chinese lacquerware.

Red played an important role in Chinese philosophy. It was believed that the world was composed of five elements: metal, wood, water, fire and earth, and that each had a color. Red was associated with fire. Each emperor chose the color that his fortune-tellers believed would bring the most prosperity and good fortune to his reign. During the Zhou, Han, Jin, Song and Ming dynasties, red was considered a noble color, and it was featured in all court ceremonies, from coronations to sacrificial offerings, and weddings.

Red was also a badge of rank. During the Song dynasty (906–1279), officials of the top three ranks wore purple clothes; those of the fourth and fifth wore bright red; those of the sixth and seventh wore green; and the eighth and ninth wore blue. Red was the color worn by the royal guards of honor, and the color of the carriages of the imperial family. When the imperial family traveled, their servants and accompanying officials carried red and purple umbrellas. Of an official who had talent and ambition, it was said "he is so red he becomes purple."

Red was also featured in Chinese Imperial architecture. In the Tang and Song dynasties, gates of palaces were usually painted red, and nobles often painted their entire mansion red. One of the most famous works of Chinese literature, A Dream of Red Mansions by Cao Xueqin (1715–63), was about the lives of noble women who passed their lives out of public sight within the walls of such mansions. In later dynasties red was reserved for the walls of temples and imperial residences. When the Manchu rulers of the Qing dynasty conquered the Ming and took over the Forbidden City and Imperial Palace in Beijing, all the walls, gates, beams and pillars were painted in red and gold.

Red is not often used in traditional Chinese paintings, which are usually black ink on white paper with a little green sometimes added for trees or plants; but the round or square seals which contain the name of the artist are traditionally red.

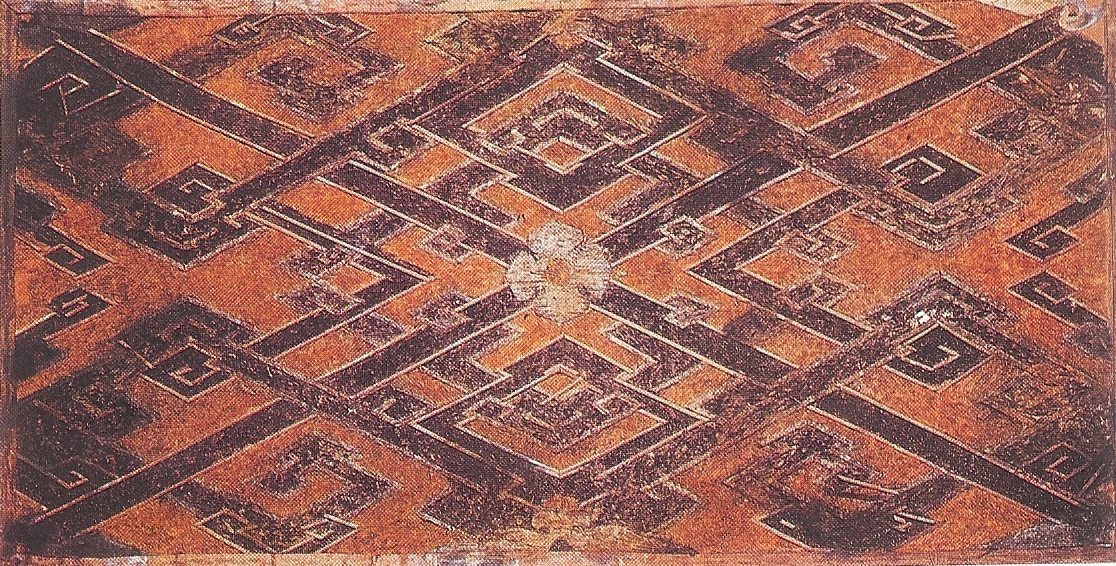
Woven silk from the Western Han dynasty, 2nd century BC

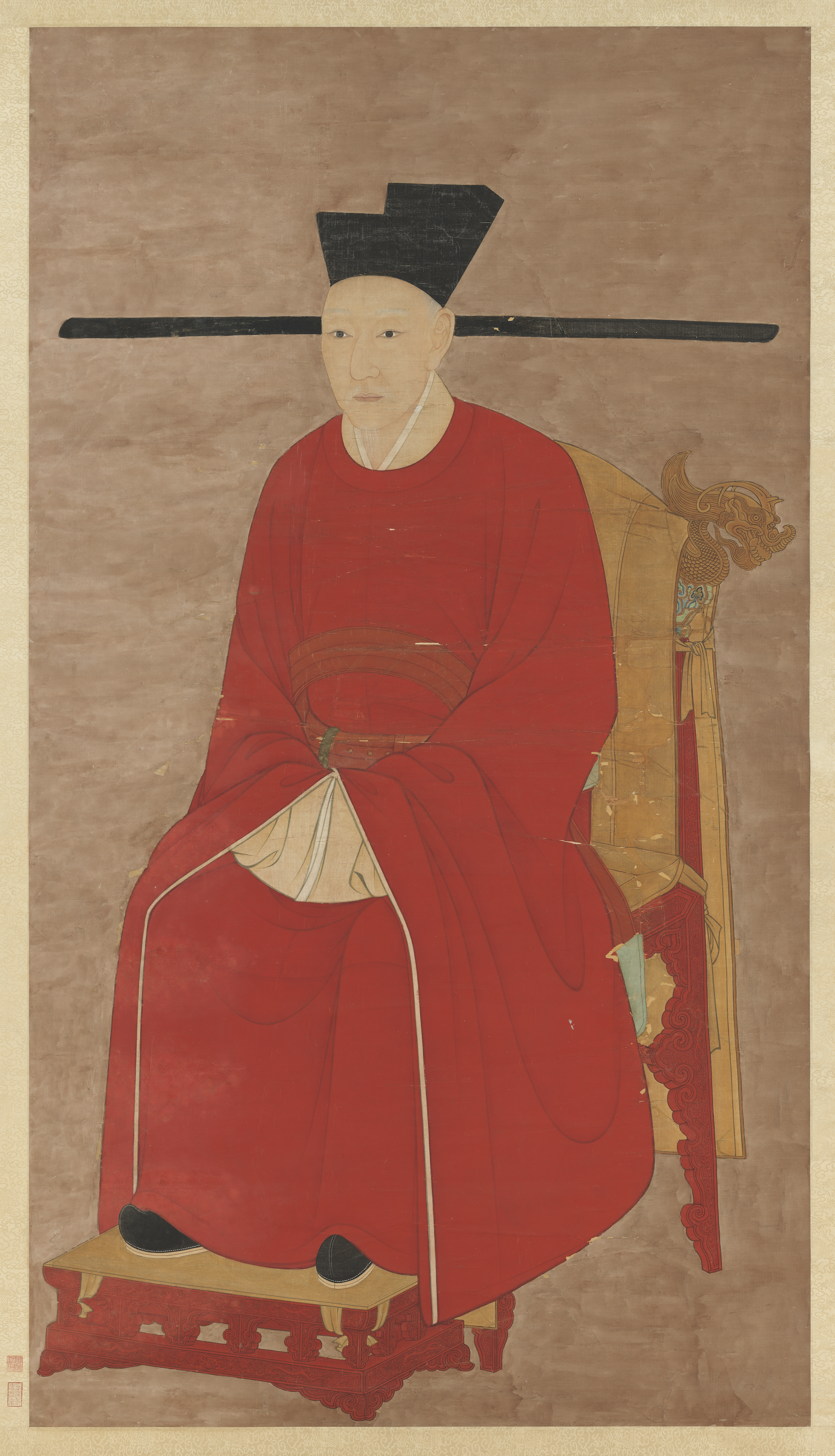
the Emperor Gaozong of Song (1127–62 AD), wearing red, the color his astrologers considered most auspicious for his reign

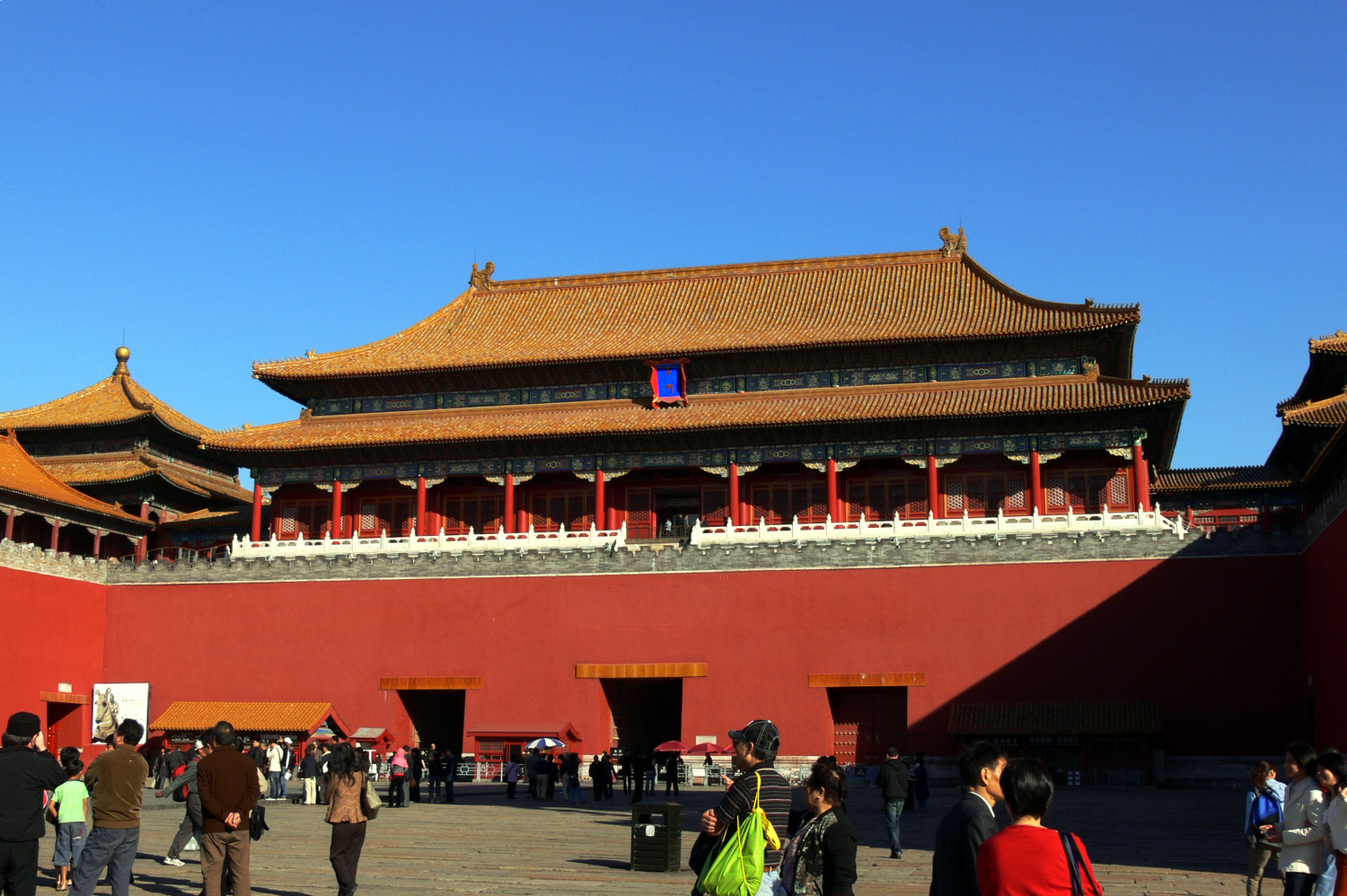
The Meridan Gate of the Forbidden City in Beijing. Walls, columns, windows and gates of palaces and temples were traditionally painted red.

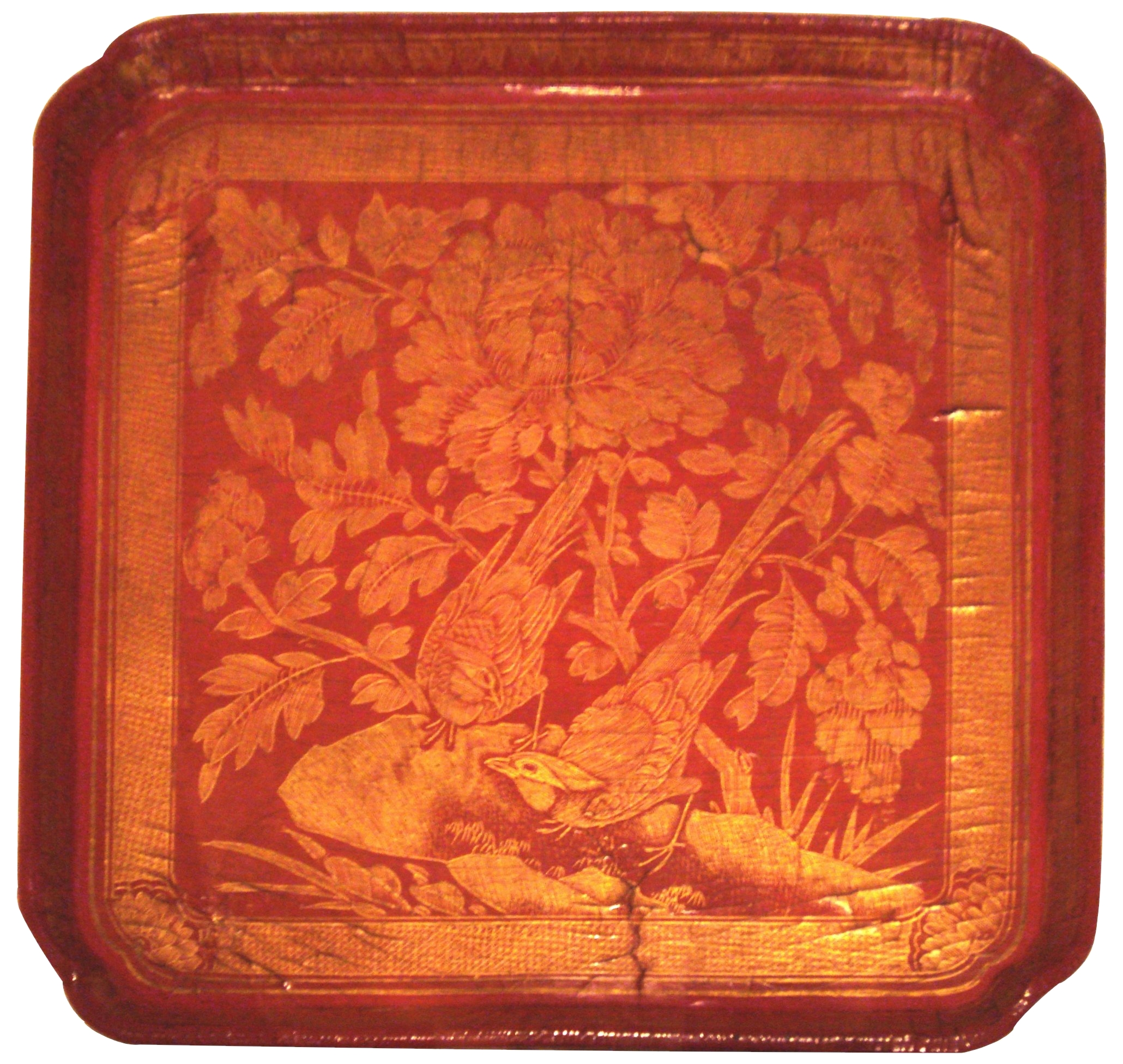
A red lacquerware tray with engraved gold foil decoration (12–13th century), from the Song dynasty

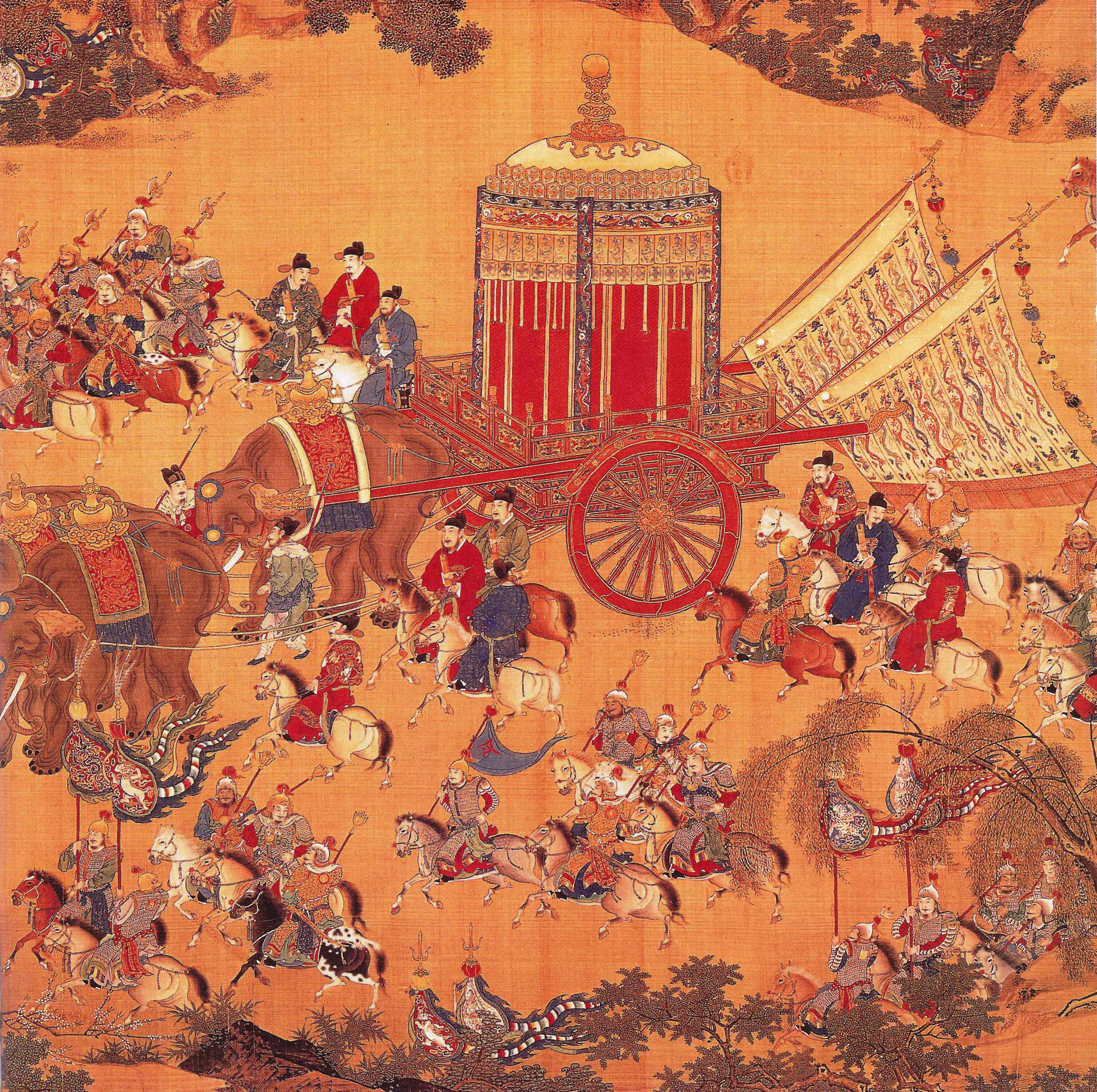
The red coach of the Ming dynasty's Xuande Emperor (1425–1435), pulled by elephants

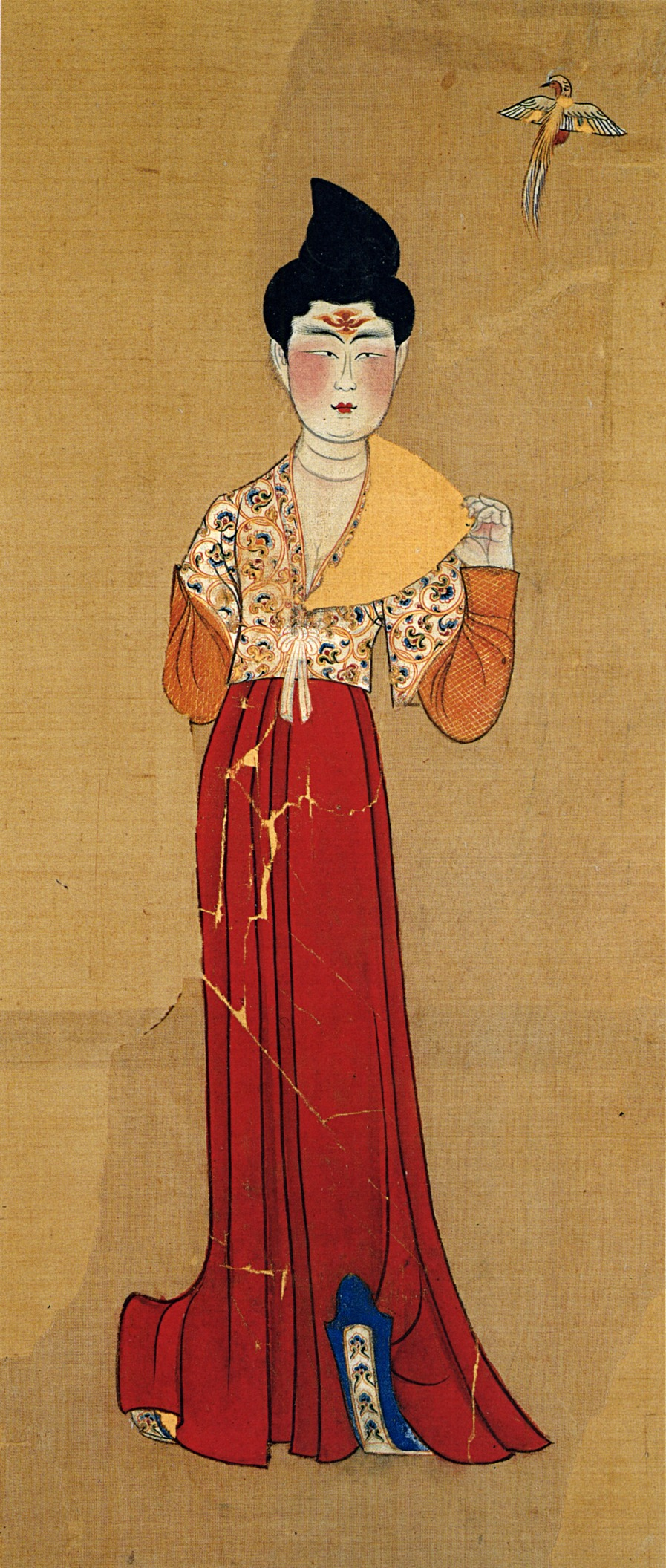
Dancer of the Tang dynasty, from the Astana Tombs

== Modern history ==
=== In the 16th and 17th centuries ===
In Renaissance painting, red was used to draw the attention of the viewer; it was often used as the color of the cloak or costume of Christ, the Virgin Mary, or another central figure. In Venice, Titian was the master of fine reds, particularly vermilion; he used many layers of pigment mixed with a semi-transparent glaze, which let the light pass through, to create a more luminous color.

During the Renaissance trade routes were opened to the New World, to Asia and the Middle East, and new varieties of red pigment and dye were imported into Europe, usually through Venice, Genoa or Seville, and Marseille. Venice was the major depot importing and manufacturing pigments for artists and dyers from the end of the 15th century; the catalog of a Venetian Vendecolori, or pigment seller, from 1534 included vermilion and kermes.

There were guilds of dyers who specialized in red in Venice and other large Europeans cities. The Rubia plant was used to make the most common dye; it produced an orange-red or brick red color used to dye the clothes of merchants and artisans. For the wealthy, the dye used was kermes, made from a tiny scale insect which fed on the branches and leaves of the oak tree. For those with even more money there was Polish Cochineal; also known as Kermes vermilio or "Blood of Saint John", which was made from a related insect, the Margodes polonicus. It made a more vivid red than ordinary Kermes. The finest and most expensive variety of red made from insects was the "Kermes" of Armenia (Armenian cochineal, also known as Persian kirmiz), made by collecting and crushing Porphyophora hamelii, an insect which lived on the roots and stems of certain grasses. The pigment and dye merchants of Venice imported and sold all of these products and also manufactured their own color, called Venetian red, which was considered the most expensive and finest red in Europe. Its secret ingredient was arsenic, which brightened the color.

But early in the 16th century, a brilliant new red appeared in Europe. When the Spanish conquistador Hernán Cortés and his soldiers conquered the Aztec Empire in 1519–1521, they discovered slowly that the Aztecs had another treasure beside silver and gold; they had the tiny cochineal, a parasitic scale insect which lived on cactus plants, which, when dried and crushed, made a magnificent red. The cochineal in Mexico was closely related to the Kermes varieties of Europe, but unlike European Kermes, it could be harvested several times a year, and it was ten times stronger than the Kermes of Poland. It worked particularly well on silk, satin and other luxury textiles. In 1523 Cortes sent the first shipment to Spain. Soon cochineal began to arrive in European ports aboard convoys of Spanish galleons.

At first the guilds of dyers in Venice and other cities banned cochineal to protect their local products, but the superior quality of cochineal dye made it impossible to resist. By the beginning of the 17th century it was the preferred luxury red for the clothing of cardinals, bankers, courtesans and aristocrats.

The painters of the early Renaissance used two traditional lake pigments, made from mixing dye with either chalk or alum, kermes lake, made from kermes insects, and madder lake, made from the rubia tinctorum plant. With the arrival of cochineal, they had a third, carmine, which made a very fine crimson, though it had a tendency to change color if not used carefully. It was used by almost all the great painters of the 15th and 16th centuries, including Rembrandt, Vermeer, Rubens, Anthony van Dyck, Diego Velázquez and Tintoretto. Later it was used by Thomas Gainsborough, Seurat and J. M. W. Turner.

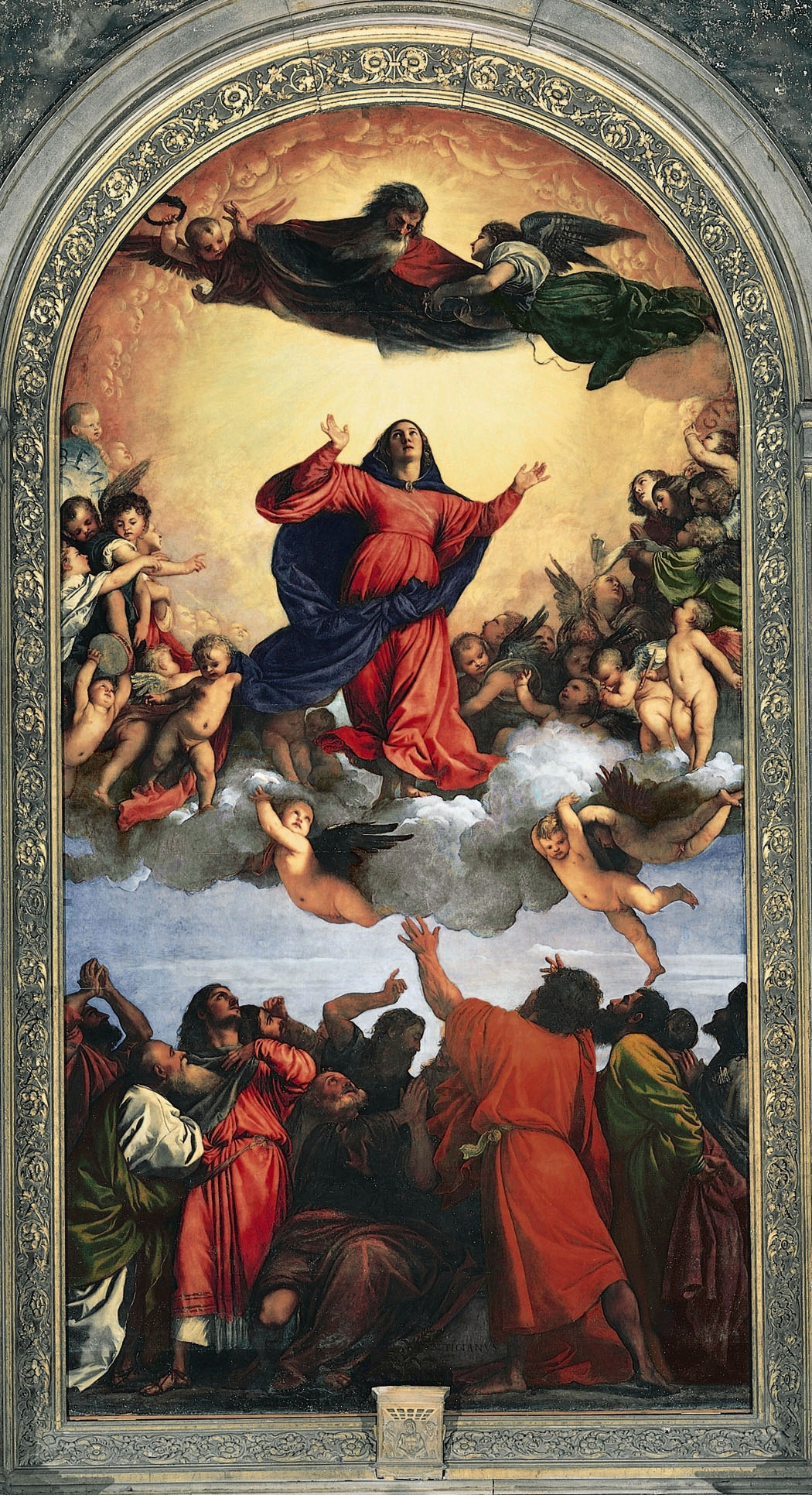
The Assumption, by Titian (1516–18). The figures of God, the Virgin Mary and two apostles are highlighted by their vermilion red costumes.

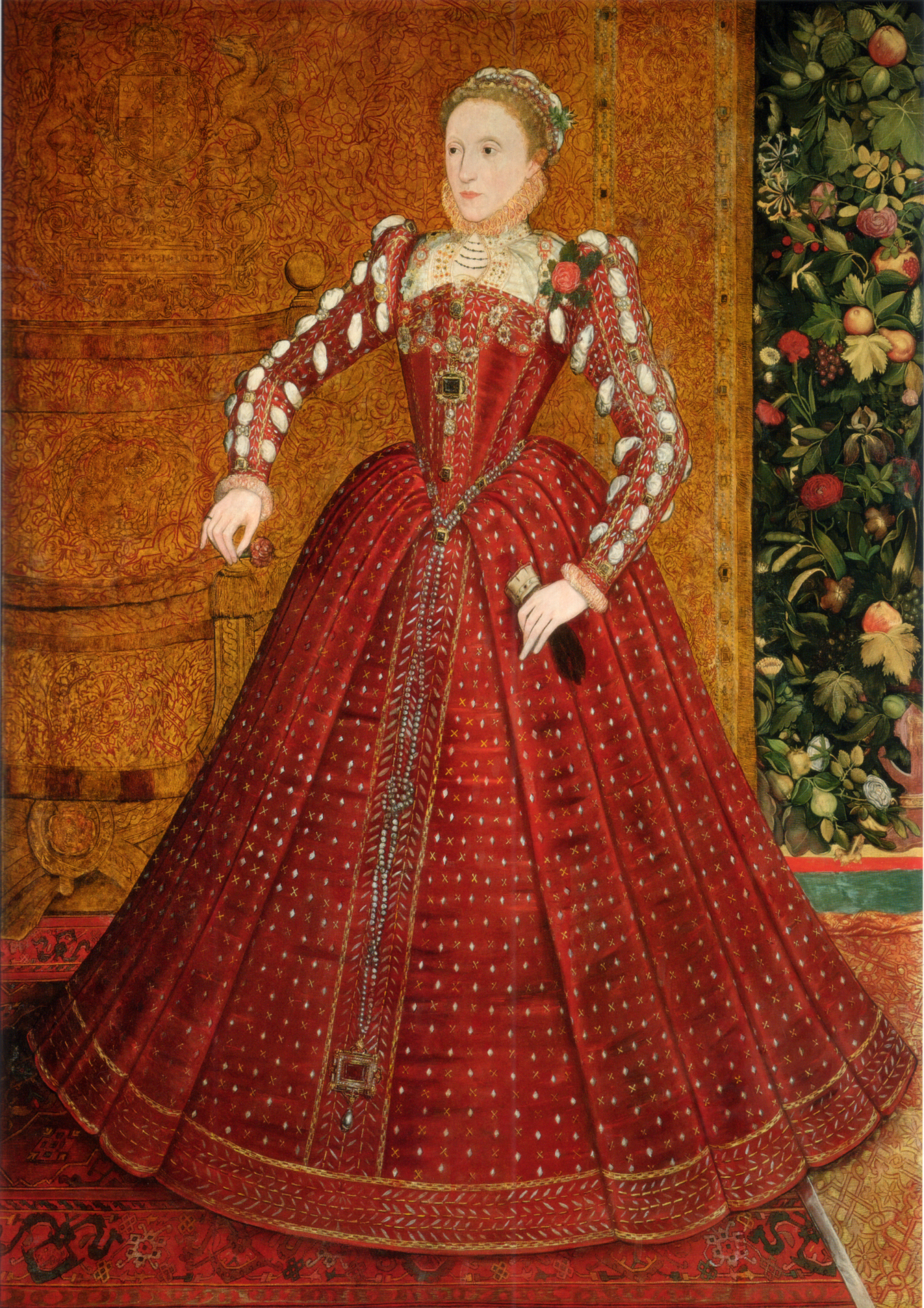
The young Queen Elizabeth I (here in about 1563) liked to wear bright reds, before she adopted the more sober image of the "Virgin Queen". Her satin gown was probably dyed with kermes.

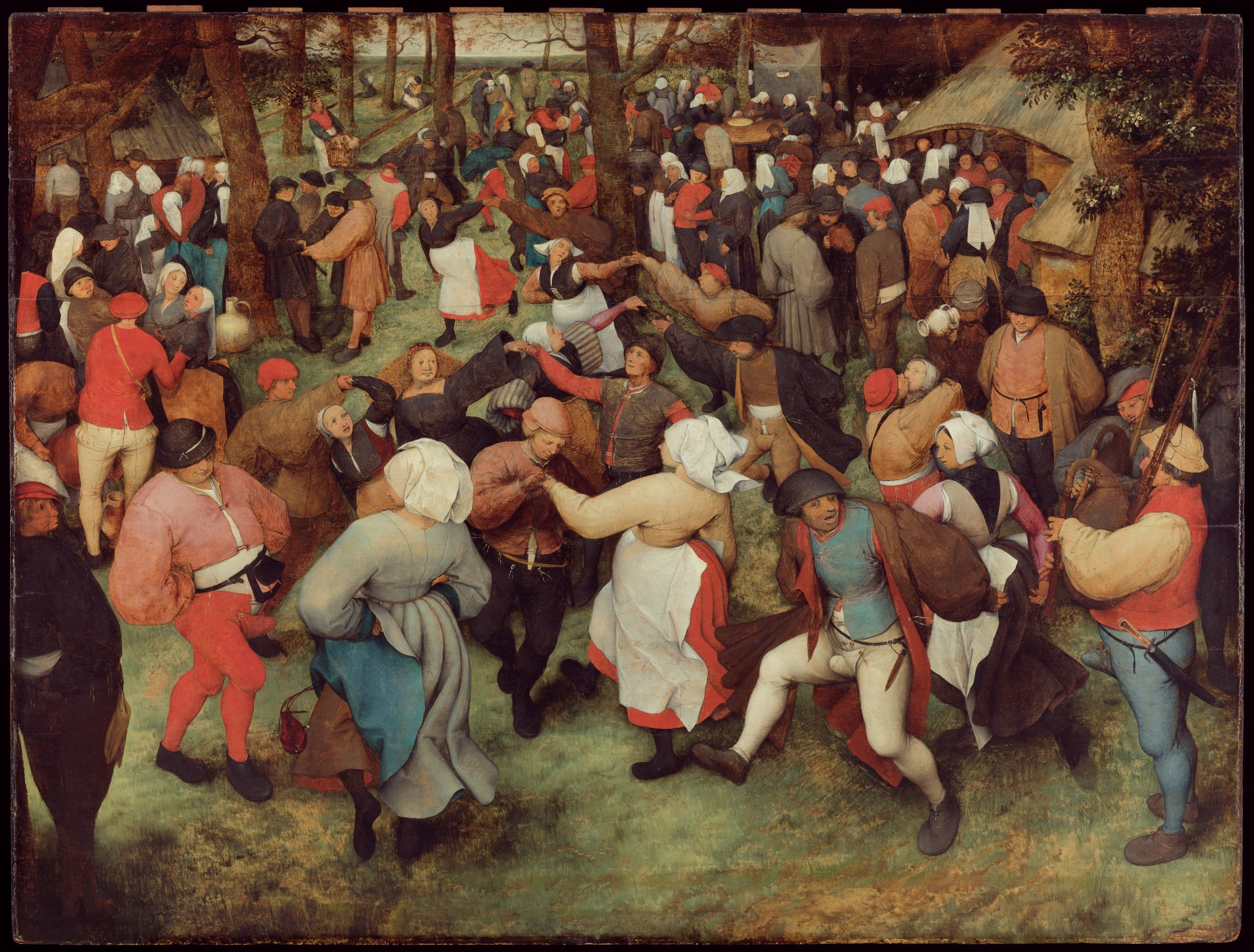
The Wedding Dance (1566), by Pieter Bruegel the Elder. In Renaissance Flanders, people of all social classes wore red at celebrations. The dye came from the root of the madder plant, which tended toward orange.

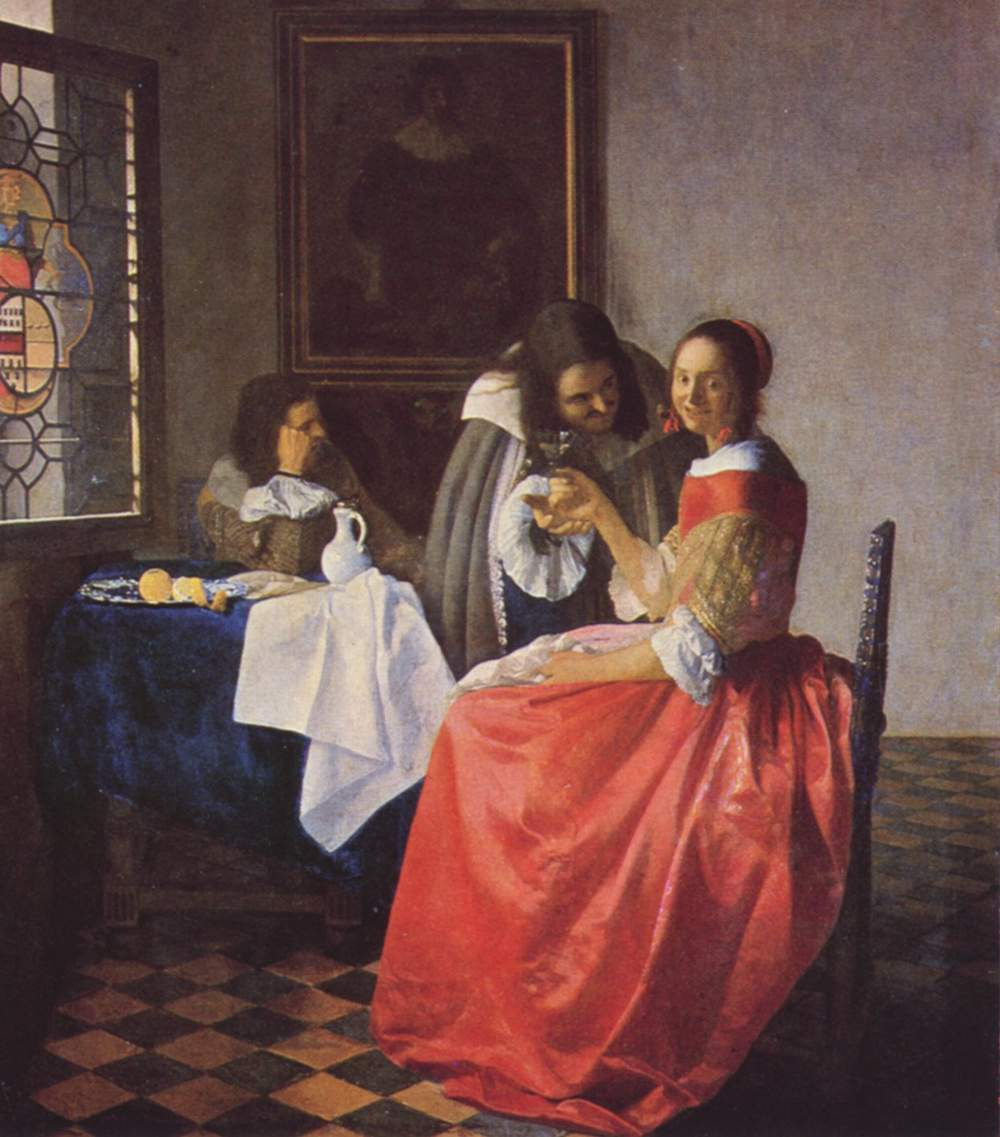
The Wine Glass, by Johannes Vermeer (1659–60). Vermeer used different shades and tints of vermilion to paint the red skirt, then glazed it with madder lake to make a more luminous color.

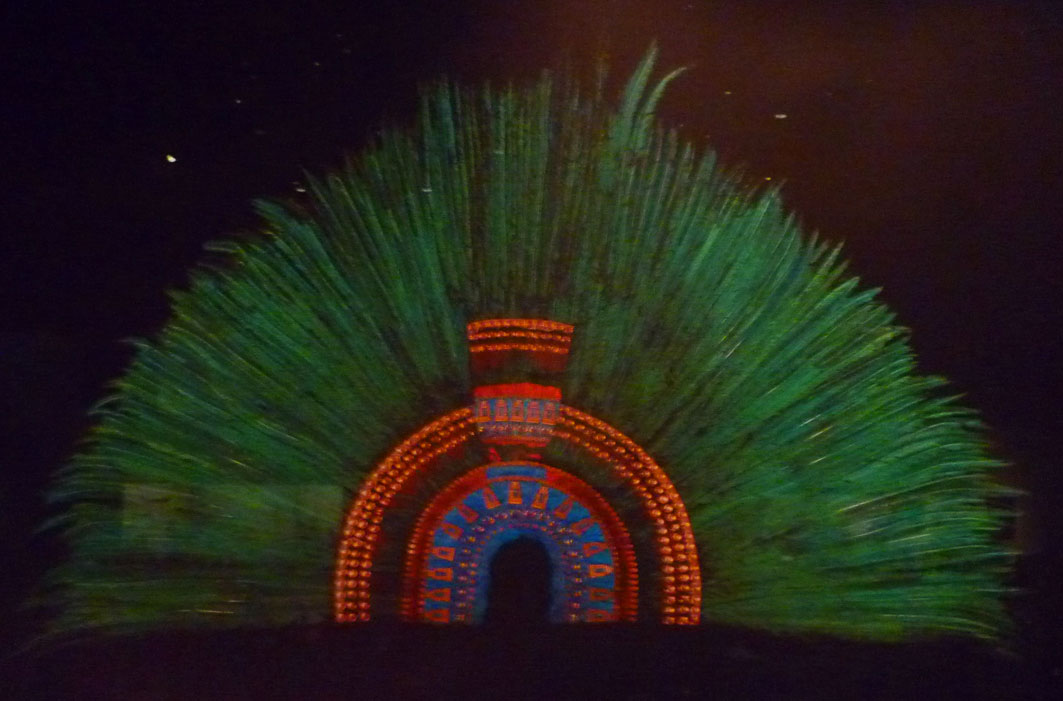
Dyed feather headdress from the Aztec people of Mexico and Central America. For red they used cochineal, a brilliant scarlet dye made from insects.

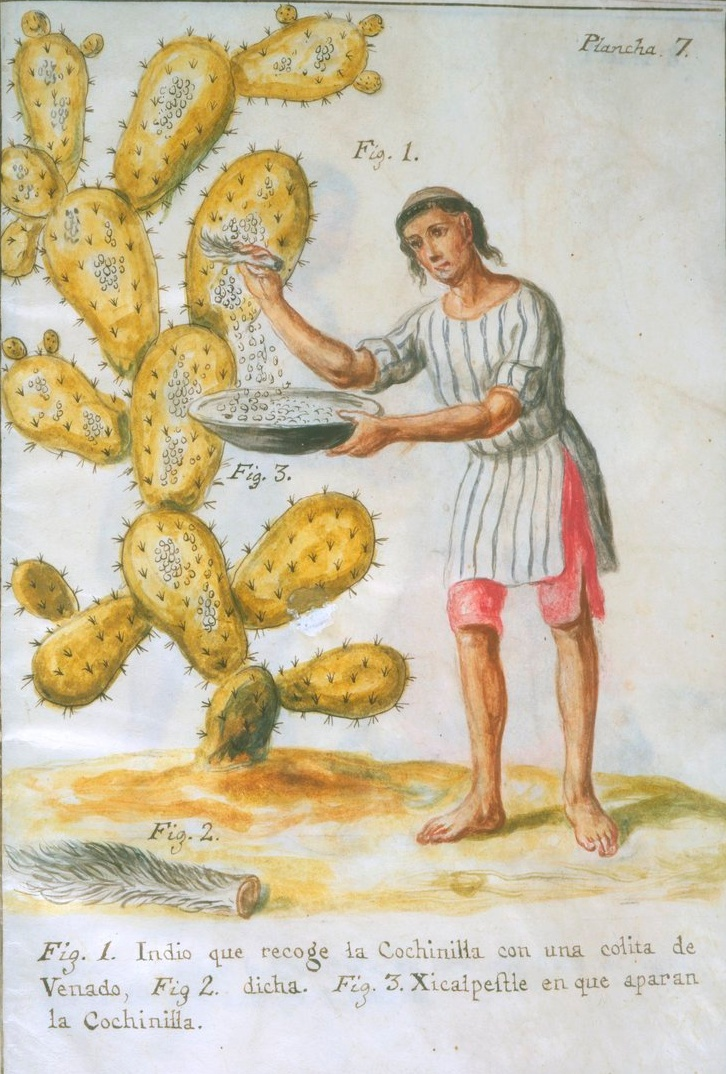
A native of Central America collecting cochineal insects from a cactus to make red dye (1777). From the 16th until the 19th century, it was a highly profitable export from Spanish Mexico to Europe.

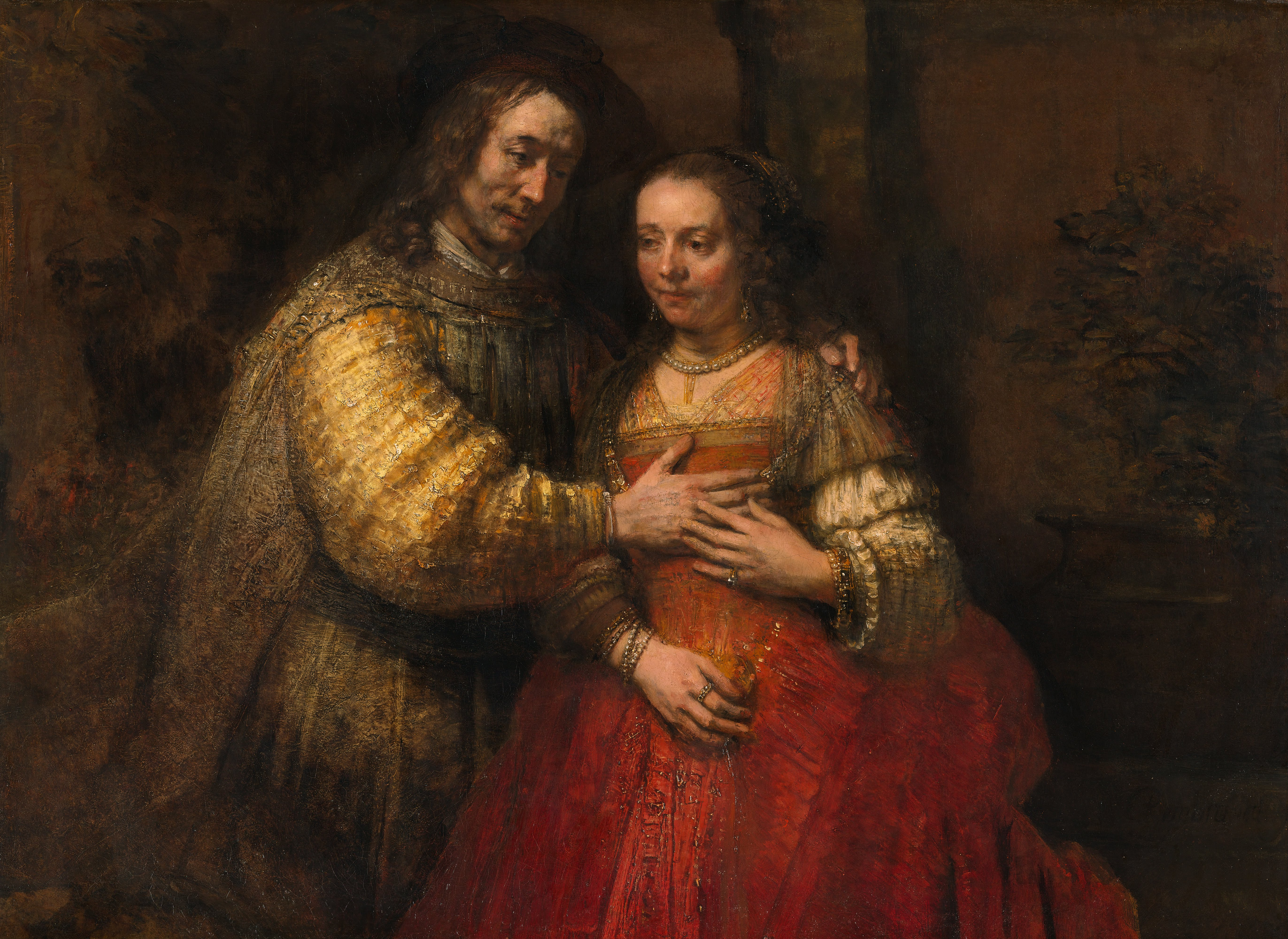
Rembrandt used carmine lake, made of cochineal, to paint the skirt of the bride in the painting known as The Jewish bride (1665–69).

The red heels of the shoes of King Louis XIV of France were discreet symbols of his royal status.

=== In the 18th and 19th centuries ===
During the French Revolution, the Jacobins and other more radical parties adopted the red flag; it was taken from red flags hoisted by the French government to declare a state of siege or emergency. Many of them wore a red Phrygian cap, or liberty cap, modeled after the caps worn by freed slaves in Ancient Rome. During the height of the Reign of Terror, Women wearing red caps gathered around the guillotine to celebrate each execution. They were called the "Furies of the guillotine". The guillotines used during the Reign of Terror in 1792 and 1793 were painted red, or made of red wood. During the Reign of Terror a statue of a woman titled liberty, painted red, was placed in the square in front of the guillotine. After the end of the Reign of Terror, France went back to the blue, white and red tricolor, whose red was taken from the red and blue colors of the city of Paris, and was the traditional color of Saint Denis, the Christian martyr and patron saint of Paris.

In the mid-19th century, red became the color of a new political and social movement, socialism. It became the most common banner of the worker's movement, of the French Revolution of 1848, of the Paris Commune in 1870, and of socialist parties across Europe. (see red flags and revolution section below).

As the Industrial Revolution spread across Europe, chemists and manufacturers sought new red dyes that could be used for large-scale manufacture of textiles. One popular color imported into Europe from Turkey and India in the 18th and early 19th century was Turkey red, known in France as rouge d'Adrinople. Beginning in the 1740s, this bright red color was used to dye or print cotton textiles in England, the Netherlands and France. Turkey red used madder as the colorant, but the process was longer and more complicated, involving multiple soaking of the fabrics in lye, olive oil, sheep's dung, and other ingredients. The fabric was more expensive but resulted in a fine bright and lasting red, similar to carmine, perfectly suited to cotton. The fabric was widely exported from Europe to Africa, the Middle East and America. In 19th-century America, it was widely used in making the traditional patchwork quilt.

In 1826, the French chemist Pierre-Jean Robiquet discovered the organic compound alizarin, the powerful coloring ingredient of the madder root, the most popular red dye of the time. In 1868, German chemists Carl Graebe and Liebermann were able to synthesize alizarin, and to produce it from coal tar. The synthetic red was cheaper and more lasting than the natural dye, and the plantation of madder in Europe and import of cochineal from Latin America soon almost completely ceased.

The 19th century also saw the use of red in art to create specific emotions, not just to imitate nature. It saw the systematic study of color theory, and particularly the study of how complementary colors such as red and green reinforced each other when they were placed next to each other. These studies were avidly followed by artists such as Vincent van Gogh. Describing his painting, The Night Cafe, to his brother Theo in 1888, Van Gogh wrote: "I sought to express with red and green the terrible human passions. The hall is blood red and pale yellow, with a green billiard table in the center, and four lamps of lemon yellow, with rays of orange and green. Everywhere it is a battle and antithesis of the most different reds and greens."

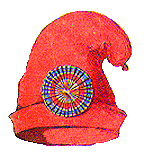
A Phrygian cap, or liberty cap, was worn by the supporters of the French Revolution of 1789.

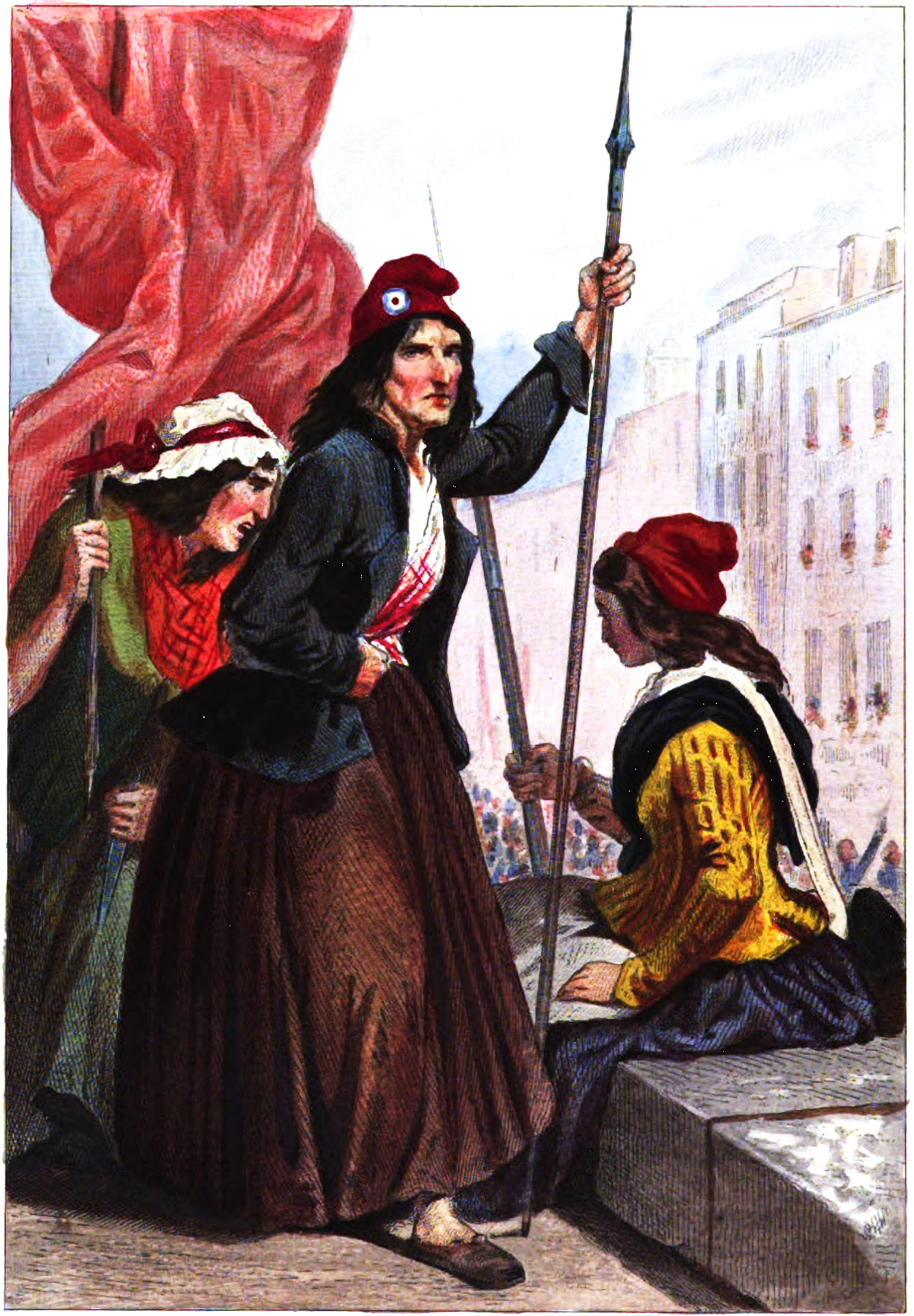
During the Reign of Terror during the later French Revolution, the "Furies of the Guillotine" cheered on each execution.

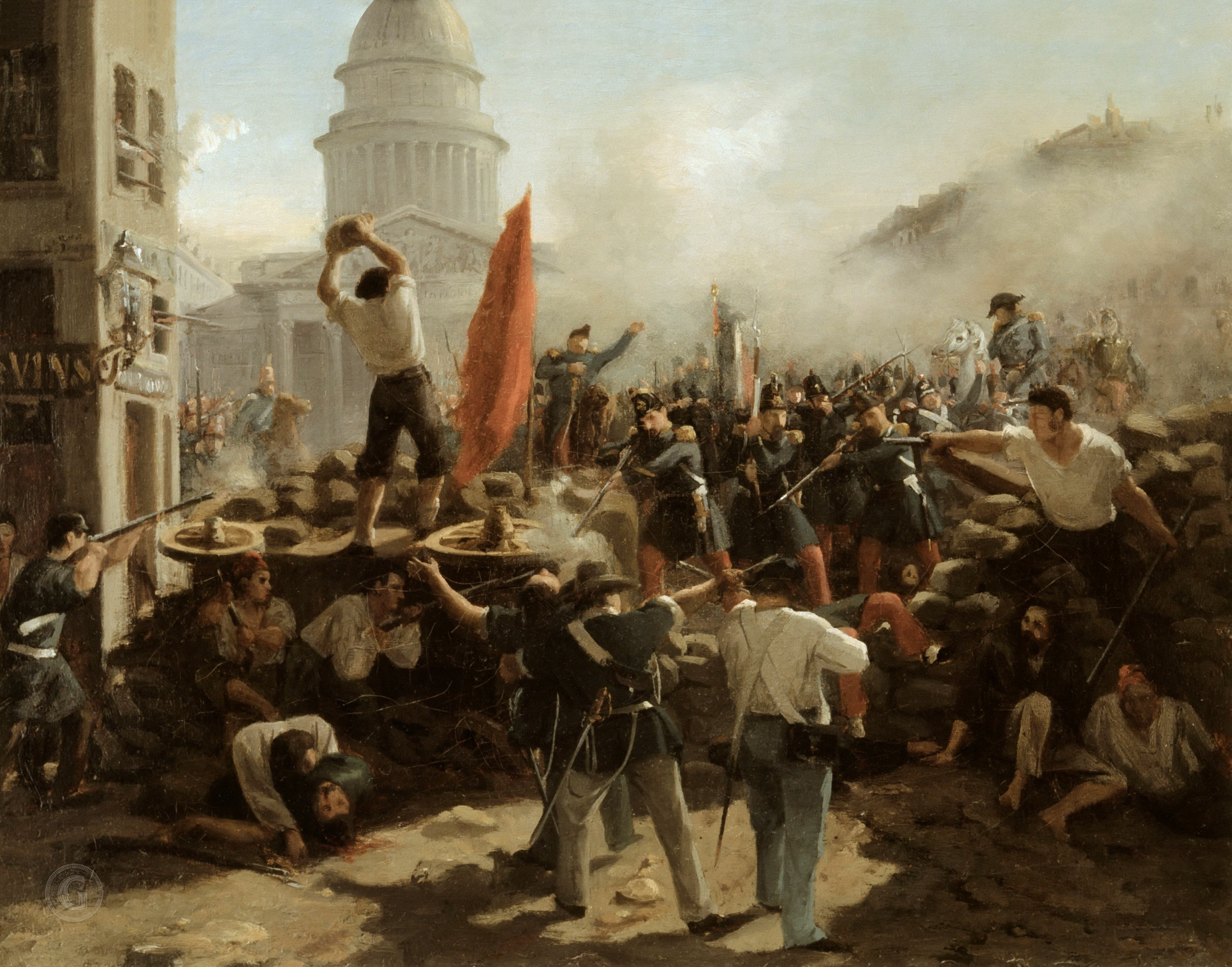
Red flag over a barricade on Rue Soufflot in Paris during the French Revolution of 1848.

The Night Café (1888), by Vincent van Gogh, used red and green to express what Van Gogh called "the terrible human passions."

=== In the 20th and 21st centuries ===
In the 20th century, red was the color of Revolution; it was the color of the Bolshevik Revolution in 1917 and of the Chinese Communist Revolution, and later of the Cultural Revolution. Red was the color of communist parties from Eastern Europe to Cuba to Vietnam.

In the late 19th and early 20th century, the German chemical industry invented two new synthetic red pigments: cadmium red, which was the color of natural vermilion, and mars red, which was a synthetic red ochre, the color of the very first natural red pigment.

The French painter Henri Matisse (1869–1954) was one of the first prominent painters to use the new cadmium red. He even tried, without success, to persuade the older and more traditional Renoir, his neighbor in the south of France, to switch from vermilion to cadmium red.

Matisse was also one of the first 20th-century artists to make color the central element of the painting, chosen to evoke emotions. "A certain blue penetrates your soul", he wrote. "A certain red affects your blood pressure." He also was familiar with the way that complementary colors, such as red and green, strengthened each other when they were placed next to each other. He wrote, "My choice of colors is not based on scientific theory; it is based on observation, upon feelings, upon the real nature of each experience ... I just try to find a color which corresponds to my feelings."

Later in the century, the American artist Mark Rothko (1903–70) also used red, in even simpler form, in blocks of dark, somber color on large canvases, to inspire deep emotions. Rothko observed that color was "only an instrument;" his interest was "in expressing human emotions tragedy, ecstasy, doom, and so on."

Rothko also began using the new synthetic pigments, but not always with happy results. In 1962 he donated to Harvard University a series of large murals of the Passion of Christ whose predominant colors were dark pink and deep crimson. He mixed mostly traditional colors to make the pink and crimson; synthetic ultramarine, cerulean blue, and titanium white, but he also used two new organic reds, Naphtol and Lithol. The Naphtol did well, but the Lithol slowly changed color when exposed to light. Within five years the deep pinks and reds had begun to turn light blue, and by 1979 the paintings were ruined and had to be taken down.

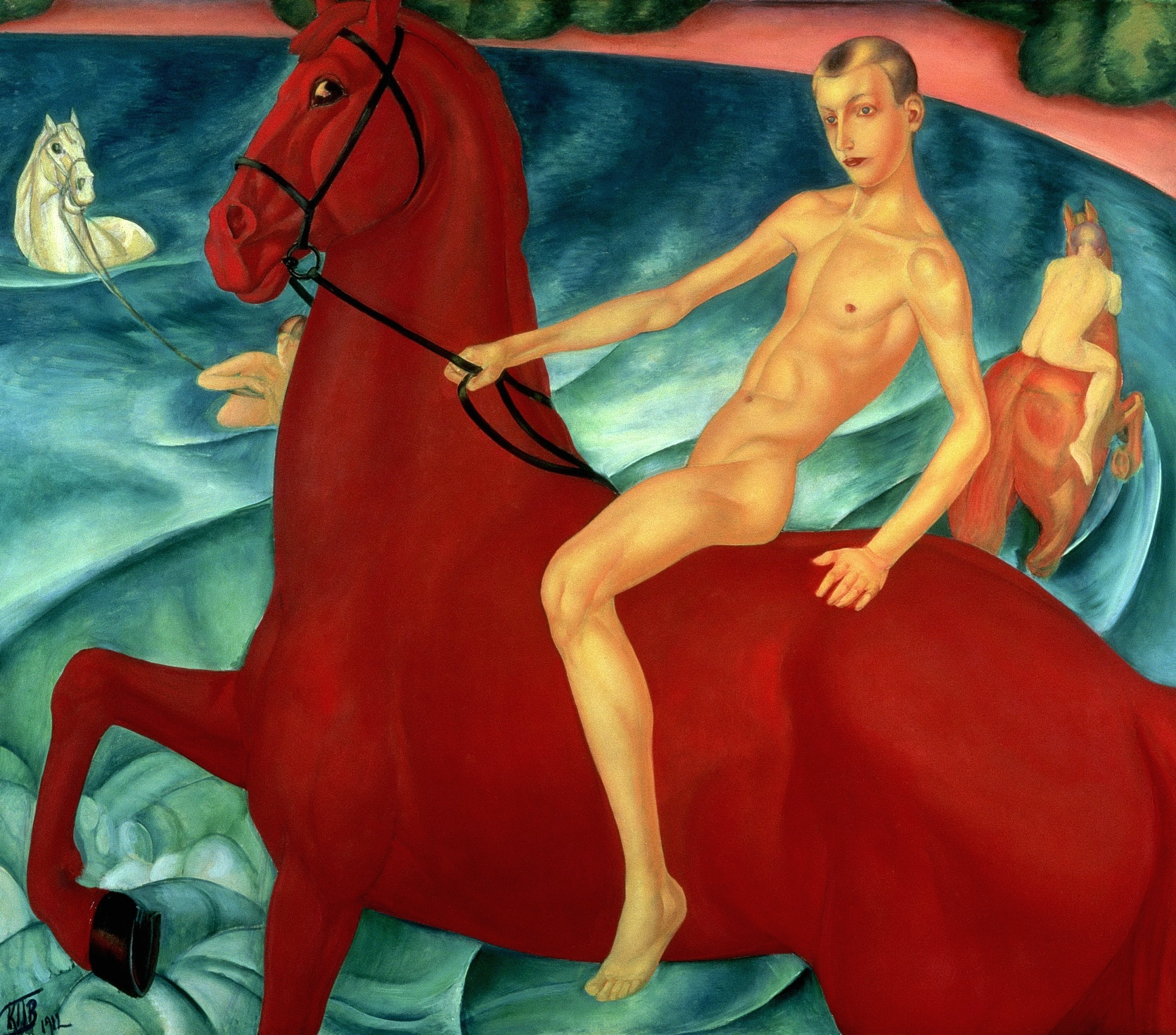
Bathing of a Red Horse, by the Russian symbolist painter Kuzma Petrov-Vodkin (1912), used a bright red horse to surprise and shock viewers. It provoked a furious discussion among Russian critics.

== See also ==
- Red pigments
- Red
