= Libermann =

Libermann is a surname. Notable people with the surname include:

- Alexander Libermann (1896–1978), American classical pianist
- Francis Libermann (1802–1852), French Roman Catholic priest
- Paulette Libermann (1919-2007), French mathematician

Schools with that name include:

- Francis Libermann Catholic High School

== See also ==
- Liebermann
