= Benjamin Liebermann =

German textile manufacturer

- Born: 4 February 1812; Märkisch Friedland
- Died: 15 January 1901 (aged 88)
- Occupation: a German textile manufacturer

Benjamin Liebermann was a German textile manufacturer. He was born at Märkisch Friedland (now Mirosławiec) on 4 February 1812 and died in Berlin on 15 January 1901. In 1825 his family moved to the latter city; and Liebermann, after completing a school course, entered the employ of a firm in London. Upon his return to Berlin he was taken into his father's business, which he soon developed into the largest calico-manufactory in Germany. That his ability was recognized is shown by the fact that he was elected to the presidency of the German merchants' association (Deutscher Handelstag). For many years he held the office of president of the Gesellschaft der Freunde, and he was treasurer of the Lehranstalt für die Wissenschaft des Judenthums at the time of its foundation.

== Sources ==
- Allgemeine Zeitung des Judenthums, 65. Jahrgang, Nummer 4, Berlin/Leipzig, Jan. 25, 1901.
- Mittheilungen aus dem Verein zur Bekämpfung des Antisemitismus, 1901, p. 29.
- Liebermann, Benjamin, in: Jewish Encyclopedia 1906, Vol. 8, pg. 80
