= Zvi Lieberman =

Russian-born Israeli children's book author

- צבי ליברמן
- Born: 1 March 1891; Mankivka, Kiev District, Russian Empire
- Died: 6 August 1985 (aged 94); Israel
- Occupations: Author, educator
- Known for: Founding Moshav Nahalal, writing children's books
- Notable work: Oded the Wanderer; Over the Ruins; From Babylonia to Jerusalem

Zvi Lieberman (also Zvi Liberman) (Hebrew: צבי ליברמן; March 1, 1891 - August 6, 1985) was a Russian-born Israeli children's book author. He immigrated to Palestine during the Second Aliyah period and helped to found Moshav Nahalal. His books became the basis for two landmark films in the history of Israeli cinema - "Oded the Wanderer" (1933) and "Over the Ruins" (1938).

== Biography ==
Zvi Lieberman (Livneh) was born in the village of Mankivka near Uman in the Kiev District (now Ukraine). He grew up in a Hasidic Jewish home and attended a traditional heder. Later he went to yeshiva and studied general subjects with a private teacher. His father, Ben-Zion, was a businessman. While many Jewish families in the village earned their living from agriculture, Ben-Zion was a bookish type who stood out for his knowledge of Hebrew. From a young age, Zvi took an interest in Zionism and joined a Zionist youth movement.

In 1912, Lieberman immigrated to Palestine with the Second Aliyah. He worked as a manual laborer and farmer in Hadera, Gan Shmuel, Degania Alef and Sejera. In 1921, Lieberman was one of the early pioneers of Nahalal, where he settled permanently.

Lieberman married Rivka Pinski. Their first daughter Heftsiba, born in 1919, died of malaria in infancy. The couple's four other children were Sarah, Rachel, Oded (for whom the fictional hero in Oded Ha-noded was named) and Dina. In 1943, Oded was seriously injured after he was attacked by an Iraqi soldier stationed at Ramat David air base. He died a year later at the age of 19. Givat Tel Sifan, a hill near Ramat David, was renamed Givat Oded in his honor.

== Public activism ==
During the First World War, Lieberman headed the employment bureau of Hapoel Hatzair. In 1916, he was one of the founders of Hamashbir Hamerkazi, an economic agency established by the Labor movement to supply consumers with reasonably priced goods. From 1919 to 1925, he helped to coordinate aliyah at the center run by the Histadrut labor federation. He was also active in the Jewish National Fund and Jewish Agency. In 1935, Lieberman was sent to the 19th Zionist Congress in Lucerne as a Labor movement delegate. He was an active member of the Farmers Association, the Israel Naval Society and the Moshavim Movement.

== Literary and journalism career ==
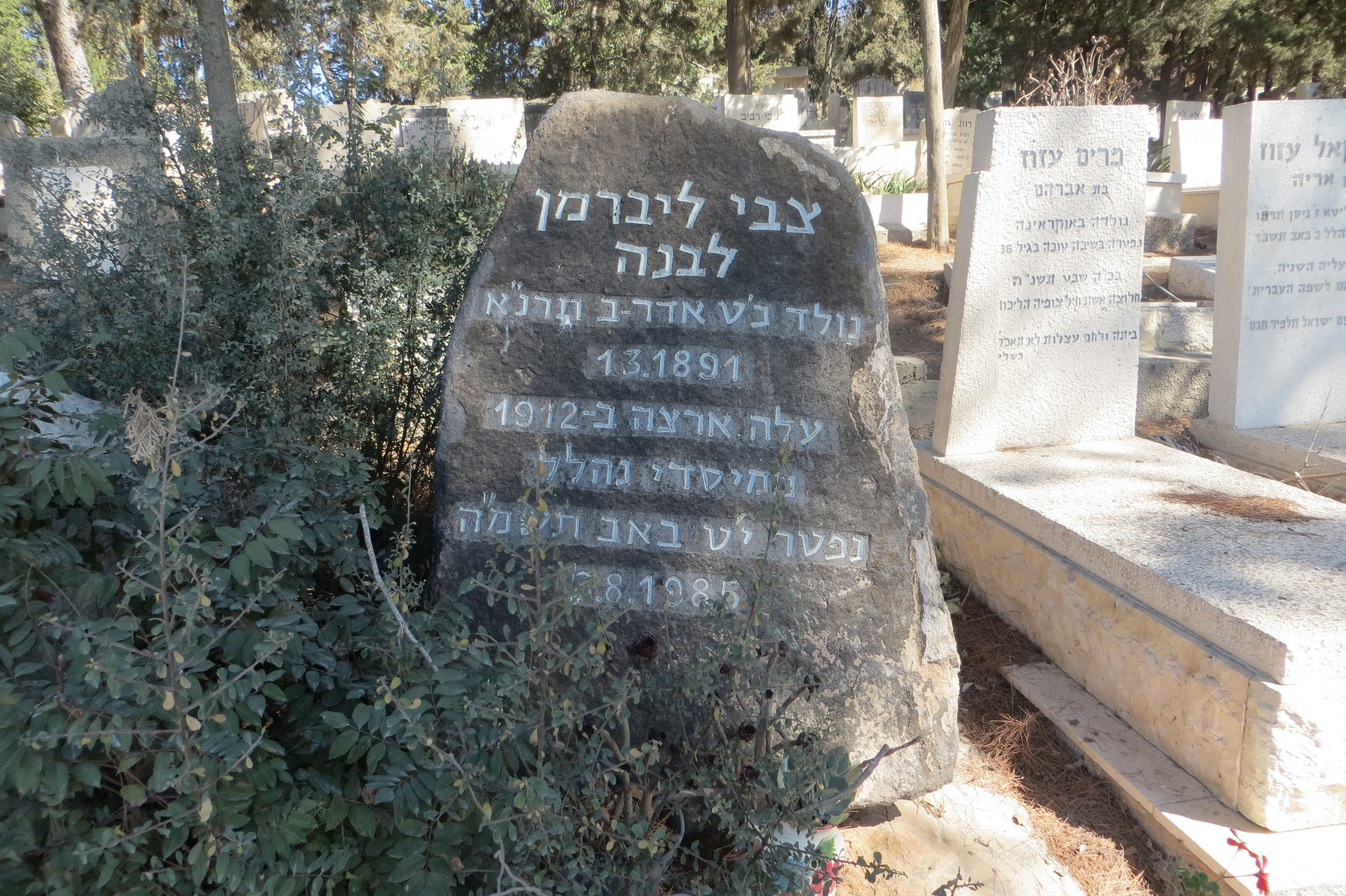
Lieberman's grave

Lieberman began to write in Ukraine, but disposed of all his papers on the eve of his move to Palestine. He published his first story in Gan Yerek, a journal published by Eliezer Yaffe in Petah Tikvah which became the organ of the Hapoel Hatzair in 1920. It was an article about bee-keeping in the Yemenite Jewish community. Over the years, he continued to write commentary and feature articles for Davar newspaper and Hapoel Hatzair.

In 1932, he began to write for children, first paperbacks like Oded the Wanderer and then hardcover books. In writing for children, he sought to provide an alternative to the cheap Yiddish books that children in the Yishuv read at the time. Over the years, Lieberman published dozens of picture books, fiction for teens and novels alongside serious research for adult audiences. In his semi-autobiographical A Tale of Love and Darkness, Israeli novelist Amos Oz relates that he read Lieberman's book Over the Ruins multiple times as a child and it made a lasting impression on him.

== Films ==
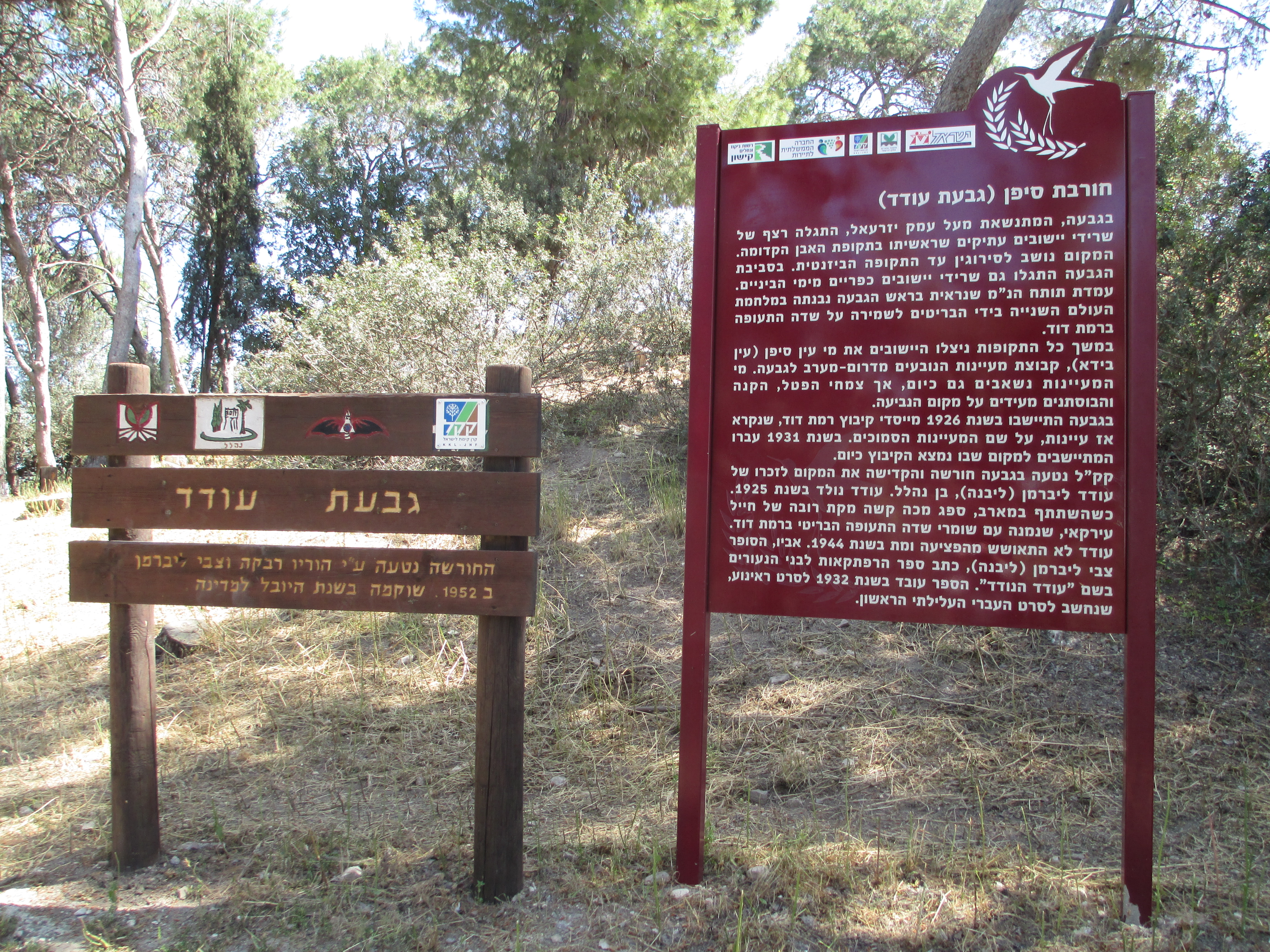
Oded Hill

In 1933, Oded ha-noded was made into a silent film. It was the country's first full-length feature film for children, produced on a shoestring budget with private financing. Important plot details were changed in the film. Oded is a young sabra who goes on a hike with school friends. When he strays from the others to record his impressions of the landscape he finds himself lost in the wilderness. After a week he reaches an Arab village, teaches the inhabitants to read and write, and finally returns home.

Another book by Lieberman, Me’al ha-khoravot (Over the Ruins) was turned into a 70-minute film with a soundtrack and dialogue. Lieberman wrote the screenplay himself. Produced in 1938 by Nathan Axelrod and directed by Alfred Wolf, it told the story of children in a Second Temple Jewish village in the Galilee where all the adults were killed by the Romans. The children rebuild the village. Production costs came to 1,000 Palestine pounds. It failed miserably at the box office, but is considered a landmark in the history of Israeli cinema.

== Literary themes ==
Lieberman wrote for children and young adults on a wide range of themes. Some of his books are about life in the kibbutz and moshav, as in the tale of Oded, a boy who goes hiking with his classmates and gets lost. Others are tales about biblical figures or Jews in the First and Second Temple periods. His novel From Babylonia to Jerusalem (1933) drew an analogy between the return from Babylon and the early waves of immigration to Palestine.

Lieberman also published utopian novels. Khalom ha-shlosha (“The Dream of Three), for example, is about three friends from the city of Safed, one of whom cares only about money, and another, only about having fun. Both are saved from a life of sin and wastefulness by the third friend who establishes a socialist commune.

Some of Lieberman's books were translated into English.

== Science fiction ==
’Tevel betkhiyata תבל בתחיתה (Renaissance of a Universe) (1955), about a utopia built by astronauts on a trip to Mars, was one of the first science fiction books written in Hebrew.

The future as predicted by Lieberman is characterized by the occurrence of the Third World War that results in destruction of the entire planet earth. Following this, reconstruction efforts are spearheaded by reformers in Israel to establish a single world government and this is supported by religious leaders.

Centuries in the future, the prosperous Earth embarks on the great venture of sending a massive spaceship, with a hundreds of a well-equipped crew, to Mars. They find Mars inhabited by humans similar to those of Earth. Politically the planet is divided into two mutually-hostile Empires, both militarist and highly oppressive to their subjects. The visitors from Earth are especially concerned about an ethnic group called the Yonodins, who live in scattered communities all over Mars and are everywhere subject to racist prejudice and persecution; a Jewish crew member intervenes to prevent a pogrom of Yonodins.

While formally keeping cordial relations with the Emperor hosting them (who hopes to gain advanced Earthly weapons for use in his next war) the visitors from Earth decide to secretly intervene in Martian politics and sponsor the creation of an underground organization aimed at overthrowing both Empires. The conspirators are led by a highly capable Yonodin woman, the love interest of the book's Jewish Israeli protagonist.

Eventually the two rival empires embark on an all-out war with each other, which might leave Mars devastated as Earth was centuries earlier. However, the underground manages to infiltrate both armies. Eventually soldiers mutiny en masse, end the war, overthrow both Emperors and unite Mars. In the happy end, Mars gains a world government modeled on Earth's, with the protagonist's beloved as its First President.

== Published works ==
- Ha-dayagim ha-ktanim, 1932 (Hebrew)
- Oded ha-noded, 1932 (Hebrew)
- Ha-Dayagim ha-Ktanim, 1932 (Hebrew)
- From Babylonia to Jerusalem, 1933 (English, Hebrew)
- Aleelot Pooty, 1933 (Hebrew)
- Khalom ha-shlosha, 1934 (Hebrew)
- Yaldei ha’emek, 1936 (Hebrew)
- Givat ha-yeladim'’, 1936 (Hebrew)
- Me’al ha- khoravot'’, 1938 (Hebrew)
- Lost on Mount Tabor, in Sabra Children: Stories of Fun and Adventure in Israel, 1940 (English)
- Masa’ay Zizi hagamad’,’ 1942 (Hebrew), illustrated by David Gilboa
- Dina veta’aluleha, 1945 (Hebrew)
- Nifgeshu bamoledet, 1945 (Hebrew)
- Amikhai, yedid kol khai, 1950 (Hebrew)
- Nehemia: Sipur histori, 1950 (Hebrew)
- Avital ve-Zalzal, 1951 (Hebrew)
- Beharei yerushalayaim, 1953 (Hebrew)
- David veyonatan: Sipur livnei no’ar, 1954 (Hebrew)
- Tevel betkhiyata, 1955 (Hebrew)
- Arba’a malakhim, 1955 (Hebrew)
- Gad vehagamad, 1956 (Hebrew)
- Yair ha-giladi, 1957 (Hebrew)
- Ha-yeled Khai vehakhamor Ashmodai, 1957 (Hebrew)
- Shimshon ba’al ha-khalomot, 1957 (Hebrew)
- Hanna veshiva baneha, 1958 (Hebrew)
- Makhbo’im, 1958 (Hebrew)
- Ha-gamadim ha-adumim, 1959 (Hebrew)
- Ma’ayanot: Sipur mekhayeh ha-moshav ha-rishon be-Eretz Yisrael, 1961 (Hebrew)
- Nekhalei Akhzav, 1963 (Hebrew)
- Ha-nesher ha-gadol, 1964 (Hebrew)
- Harpatka’otav shel Dan, 1964 (Hebrew)
- Gidon vekhaverav, 1964 (Hebrew)
- Khayeh akhat khalutzah: Sipur khayeha shel Rivka Livneh Liberman le-vet Pinski, 1964 (Hebrew)
- Bishleekhut kalkalit: Khevrat Ampal, koroteha u-pe’ala, 1964 (Hebrew)
- Givat avanim: Sipur, 1965 (Hebrew)
- Jewish Farmers in Russia Fields, 1965 (Hebrew, English)
- Ikarim yehudim be-rusiya: Skira historit al khakla’im be-rusiya mishnat 1807 (Jewish Agriculturalists on the Russian Steppes), 1965 (Hebrew)
- David ve-Aminadav: Sipur histori mitekufat Shaul ve-David, 1966 (Hebrew)
- Ha-kana’im ladror: Roman histori mitkufat Bar Kokhba, 1966 (Hebrew)
- The Children of the Cave: A Tale of Israel and Rome, 1969 (Hebrew, English)
- Ha-khamisha, 1969 (Hebrew)
- In the Beginning: The Story of Abraham, 1969 (English)
- Avram ha-ivri, 1973 (Hebrew)
- Misipurei hakhevraiya, 1973 (Hebrew)
- Bein sadeh veya’ar, 1974 (Hebrew)
- Moshe, 1977 (Hebrew)
- Betzel ha-ikaliptus, 1978 (Hebrew)
- Khalomot uma’asim, 1978 (Hebrew)
- Mikhayay hapo’alim be-Hadera, 1912–1920, 1983 (Hebrew)
- Sivan bakaiyitz uvkhoref, 1998 (Hebrew)
