= Libman =

Libman is a surname. Notable people with the surname include:

- Andrea Libman (born 1984), Canadian actress and voice actor
- Emanuel Libman (1872–1946), American physician
- Leslie Libman, American television director
- Robert Libman (born 1960), former politician in Quebec, Canada
- Salomón Libman (born 1984), Peruvian goalkeeper

== Other ==
- Libman Company, an American cleaning supplies manufacturer

== See also ==
- Libman v. Quebec (Attorney General), a Supreme Court of Canada ruling issued on October 9, 1997
- Libman-Sacks endocarditis, a form of nonbacterial endocarditis seen in systemic lupus erythematosus
