= Simcha Lieberman =

Israeli rabbi (1929–2009)

Rabbi Simcha Binem Lieberman (Hebrew: שמחה בינעם לייברמן; 29 December 1926 – 28 June 2009) was an Israeli Talmudic scholar, lecturer at Jews' College, London, and a prolific writer. He was one of the last survivors of the Warsaw Ghetto.

== Poland ==
Simcha Binem was born in Warsaw, Poland on 29 December 1926 (24 Teveth 5687 in the Hebrew calendar) to his father Rabbi Brachya Lieberman, a notable Amshinov hasid. He received the traditional education in chasidic families, steeped in the study of the Talmud and its commentators. This ended abruptly in 1939 with the Nazi invasion of Poland.

With the enclosure of Warsaw Jewry in a confined ghetto, his education continued along with the fight for survival entailed in ghetto life. He received Smicha for his Bar Mitzva in the Ghetto from Rabbi Menachem Ziemba. When the bulk of the ghetto population was sent to the Treblinka extermination camp, Simcha, as an able-bodied teenager, was transferred to Majdanek, where he worked as a slave labourer. He was tortured brutally on account of his studying in secret in the bunkers. Ultimately, he was imprisoned in seven concentration camps including Dachau and Theresienstadt.

== England ==
In 1945 he was rescued by Rabbi Dr. Solomon Schonfeld, Director of the Chief Rabbi's Emergency Council, and brought to England. He returned to his studies and eventually became a Fellow of Gateshead Kollel. He married Chava Sosha, a survivor of the Auschwitz concentration camp.

In 1960 he was appointed head of the Hendon Kolel.

In 1971 he was appointed to the faculty of Jews' College, London as a lecturer in Talmud and Codes, a post he held until 1984, when he was 'made redundant' by the then Principal of the college, Jonathan Sacks (now Chief Rabbi of Great Britain). He then used his vast Talmudic knowledge to start writing a series of volumes titled Bishvilei Oraiso (in the paths of the Torah) and delivering public lectures on the fruits of his research.

== Israel ==
In 1992 Rabbi Simcha emigrated from England and settled in the Har Canaan district of Tzfat, a mountain-top city in the Galilee, Israel. He established an institute for the publication of his writings, eventually publishing 20 volumes in the Bishvilei Oraiso series.

His wife Chava predeceased him. He died on 28 June 2009, aged 79, leaving 11 children.

== Publications ==
- Bishvilei haShechito
- Bishvilei haMoed
- Bishvilei haShviso
- Bishvilei haMikdosh
- Bishvilei haShabbos
- Bishvilei ha’Avodah. Tzefas 1998
