= Human uses of birds =

Overview of humans' uses of birds

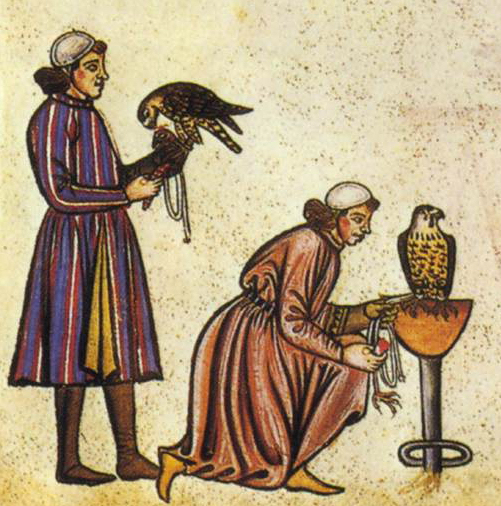
Detail of two falconers from the Medieval De arte venandi cum avibus, c. 1240

Human uses of birds have, for thousands of years, included both economic uses such as food, and symbolic uses such as art, music, and religion.

In terms of economic uses, birds have been hunted for food since Palaeolithic times. They have been captured and bred as poultry to provide meat and eggs since at least the time of ancient Egypt. Some species have been used, too, to help locate or to catch food, as with cormorant fishing and the use of honeyguides. Feathers have long been used for bedding, as well as for quill pens and for fletching arrows. Today, many species face habitat loss and other threats caused by humans; bird conservation groups work to protect birds and to influence governments to do so.

Birds have appeared in the mythologies and religions of many cultures since ancient Sumer. For example, the dove was the symbol of the ancient Mesopotamian goddess Inanna, the Canaanite mother goddess Asherah, and the Greek goddess Aphrodite. Athena, the Greek goddess of wisdom, had a little owl as her symbol, and, in ancient India, the peacock represented Mother Earth. Birds have often been seen as symbols, whether bringing bad luck and death, being sacred, or being used in heraldry. In terms of entertainment, raptors have been used in falconry, while cagebirds have been kept for their song. Other birds have been raised for the traditional sports of cockfighting and pigeon racing. Birdwatching, too, has grown to become a major leisure activity. Birds feature in a wide variety of art forms, including in painting, sculpture, poetry and prose, film and fashion. Birds also appear in music as well as traditional dance and ballet. In certain cases, such as the bird-and-flower painting of China, birds are central to an artistic genre.

== Context ==
Culture consists of the social behaviour and norms found in human societies and transmitted through social learning. Cultural universals in all human societies include expressive forms like art, music, dance, ritual, religion, and technologies like tool usage, cooking, shelter, and clothing. The concept of material culture covers physical expressions such as technology, architecture and art, whereas immaterial culture includes principles of social organization, mythology, philosophy, literature, and science. This article describes the roles played by birds in human culture, so defined.

== Economic uses ==
Birds are important economically, providing substantial amounts of food, especially protein, largely but not exclusively from the domestic chicken; feathers and down are used for bedding, insulation, and other purposes.

=== As food ===
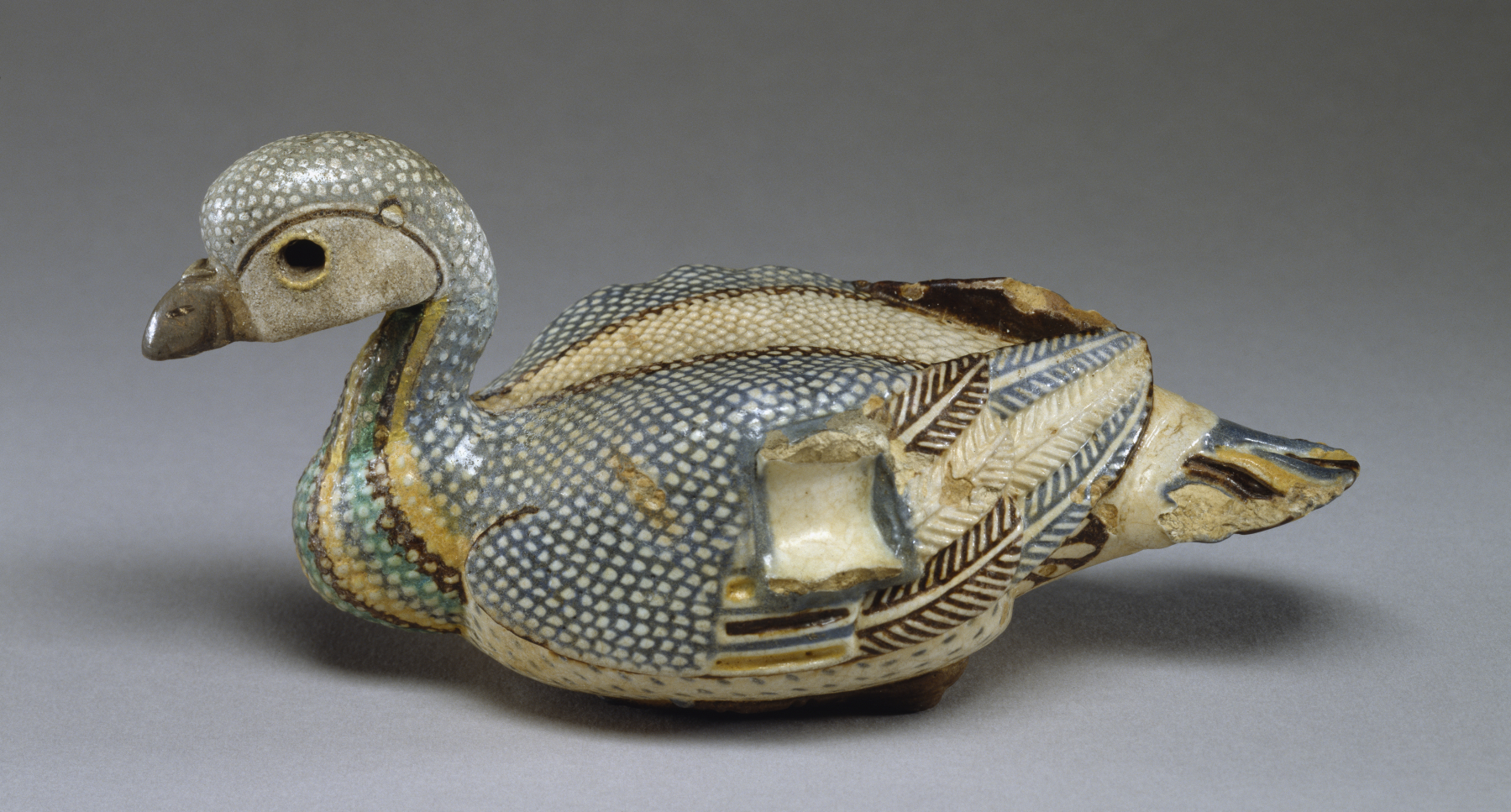
Ducks were common in Ancient Egypt, as depicted in this 3rd century BC faience vase.

Birds were among the wild animals hunted for food before the Neolithic Revolution and the development of agriculture. For example, in the Epipaleolithic of the Levant, between c. 14,500 and 11,500 BP, both waterfowl and migratory birds were eaten. Archaeologists have studied the return in terms of energy from captured food compared to the energy expended to capture it; birds provide a smaller return than larger game such as deer, but better than many plant materials. For example, waterfowl captured in a drive can yield a return of around 2,000 kcal/hour, whereas an antelope can yield as much as 31,000 kcal/hour, and wild rye around 1,000 kcal/hour.

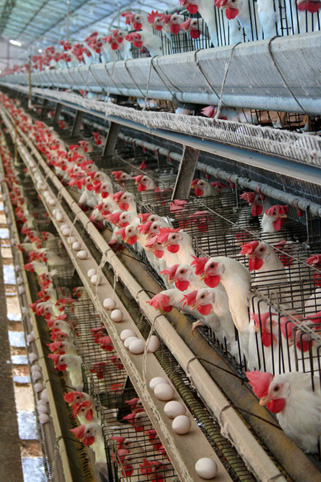
Battery hens: poultry is a major source of food, the chicken alone providing 20% of the world's animal protein.

Birds have been domesticated and bred as poultry for use as food for at least four thousand years. The most important species is the chicken. It appears to have been domesticated by 5000 BC in northeastern China, likely for cockfighting, and only later used for food. In ancient Egypt, poultry including ducks, geese, and pigeons were captured in nets and then bred in captivity.

Chicken now provides some 20% of the animal protein eaten by the world's human population in the form of meat and eggs. Chickens are often raised intensively in battery farms; this facilitates production but has been criticised on animal welfare grounds. Other species including ducks, geese, pheasants, guineafowl and turkeys are significant economically around the world. Less commonly raised species such as the Common ostrich are starting to be farmed for their meat, which is low in cholesterol; they have also been kept for their feathers, and for leather from their skin.

Birds are hunted in many countries around the world. In the developed world, ducks such as mallard, wigeon, shoveler and teal have for centuries been captured by wildfowlers, while pheasants, partridges, grouse, and snipe are among the terrestrial birds that are hunted for sport, generally with guns. In other parts of the world, traditional subsistence hunting still continues, as in rural Northern Papua, where cassowaries, crowned pigeons, hornbills and megapodes are captured for food. Seabirds such as muttonbirds, penguins and auks have been hunted for food, formerly with sufficient intensity to threaten many populations and to make some, such as the great auk, extinct. Seabird hunting continues at more moderate levels today, for instance with the traditional Māori harvest of sooty shearwater chicks.

=== Assisting hunters and gatherers ===
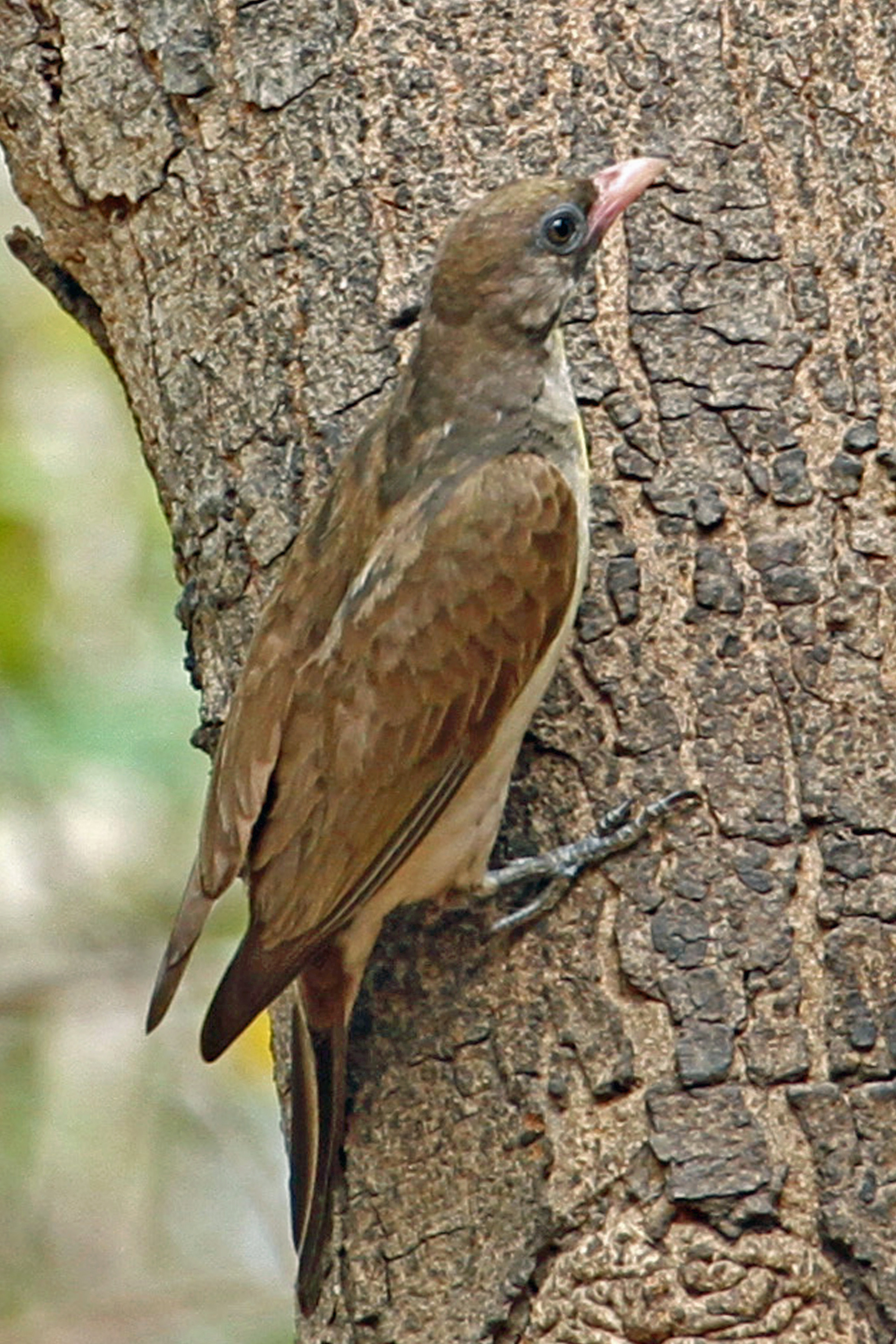
Some peoples in Africa are guided to the nests of wild bees by the greater honeyguide.

The archaeological and historical records suggest interdependence between humans and vultures for millions of years. Like other animal species, early hominins probably used these birds as beacons signalling the location of meat, in the form of carcasses, in the landscape.

Cormorant fishing is a traditional fishing method in which trained cormorants are used to catch fish in rivers. Historically, cormorant fishing has taken place in Japan and China since about 960 AD.

The greater honeyguide guides people in some parts of Africa to the nests of wild bees. A guiding bird attracts a person's attention with a chattering call, and flies in short bounds towards a bees' nest. When the human honey-hunter has taken their honey, the honeyguide eats what is left. The Boran people of East Africa use a specific whistle, which doubles the encounter rate with honeyguides; they find that using a honeyguide reduces the time to find honey by two-thirds. The Bushmen of the Kalahari thank the honeyguide with a gift of honey.

=== Materials ===
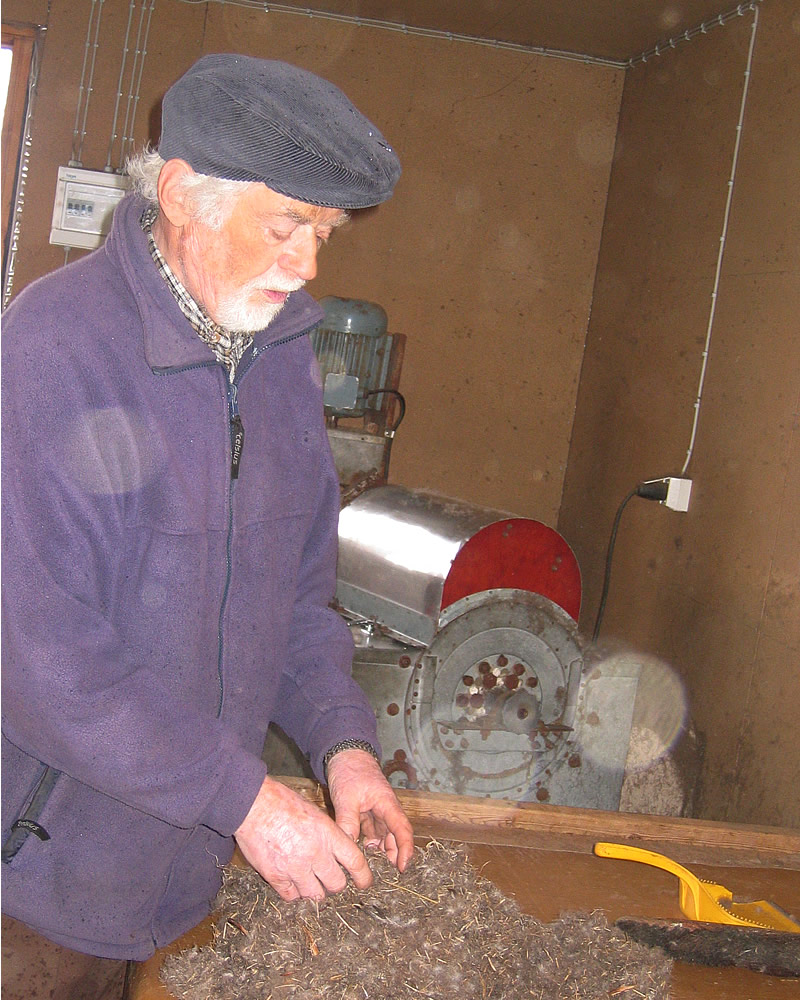
A farmer in Iceland separating eiderdown gathered from nests of eider ducks from mixed-in hay

Feathers are used to make warm and soft bedding, including eiderdowns from the belly down of the eider duck, and winter clothing as they have high "loft", trapping a large amount of air for their weight. Feathers were used also for quill pens, for fletching arrows, and to decorate fishing lures.

Bird bones were used by Stone Age peoples to make awls and other tools. Guano, the droppings of seabirds, rich in nitrogen, phosphorus, and potassium, was once important as an agricultural fertiliser and is still used in organic farming. The War of the Pacific in 1865 was in part about which country had control of the territory containing valuable guano sources. Today, birds such as the chicken and the Japanese quail are used as model organisms in ornithological and more generally in biological research, for instance in toxicology.

=== Clothing and fashion ===
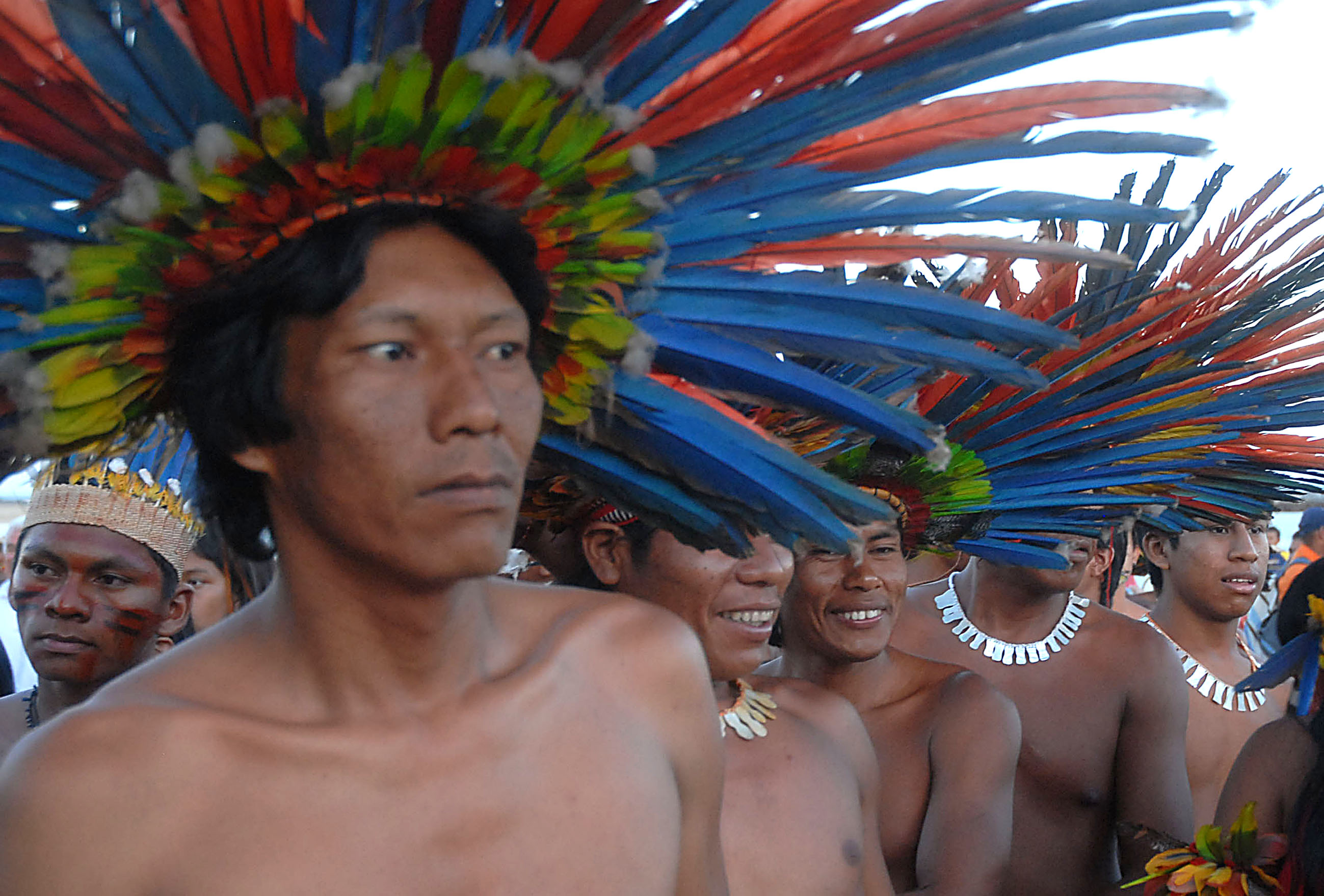
Bororo men wearing brightly-coloured feathered headdresses

Feathers have been important and colourful items of clothing and fashion from before the birth of civilisation. Elaborate, brightly coloured headdresses containing feathers are worn by indigenous peoples of the Americas such as the Bororo of the Mato Grosso. In Polynesia, sega ula lory bird feathers were major trade items, used to decorate high quality mats in Samoa and Tonga. The use of bird skins for Inuit clothing has been documented across all Inuit groups, although it was most common in the eastern and western Arctic, where larger animals like caribou were less available.

In Western culture, feathers are used in boas and decorating elaborate hats and other items of ladies' clothing. Feathers in fashion were a status symbol well into the nineteenth and twentieth centuries. The Belle Epoque draped its clothing in feathers as ornaments. The Hudson's Bay Company of Canada traded in swans and sometimes geese, for their skins and quills in the 18th and 19th centuries; the skins were then sent to Europe. Ostrich plumes were a luxury commodity in Europe for centuries, leading to serious harm to wild ostrich populations, and subsequent establishment of ostrich farms. During the 19th and early 20th centuries, Plume hunting for feathers used in hats decimated bird populations, especially in the American South where egrets and spoonbills were common targets. Efforts to stop the decline in bird populations caused by these practices by early conservation groups led to the creation of the first National Wildlife Refuge, Pelican Island. Classical 1930s Hollywood films used feathers in abundance, arguably as a metaphor for female sexuality. For example, in the 1935 musical Top Hat, Ginger Rogers danced "Cheek to Cheek" covered in white plumes that emphasised her movements. Late twentieth century designers such as Yves Saint Laurent and Alexander McQueen used feathers to make fashion statements.

=== Sports and hobbies ===
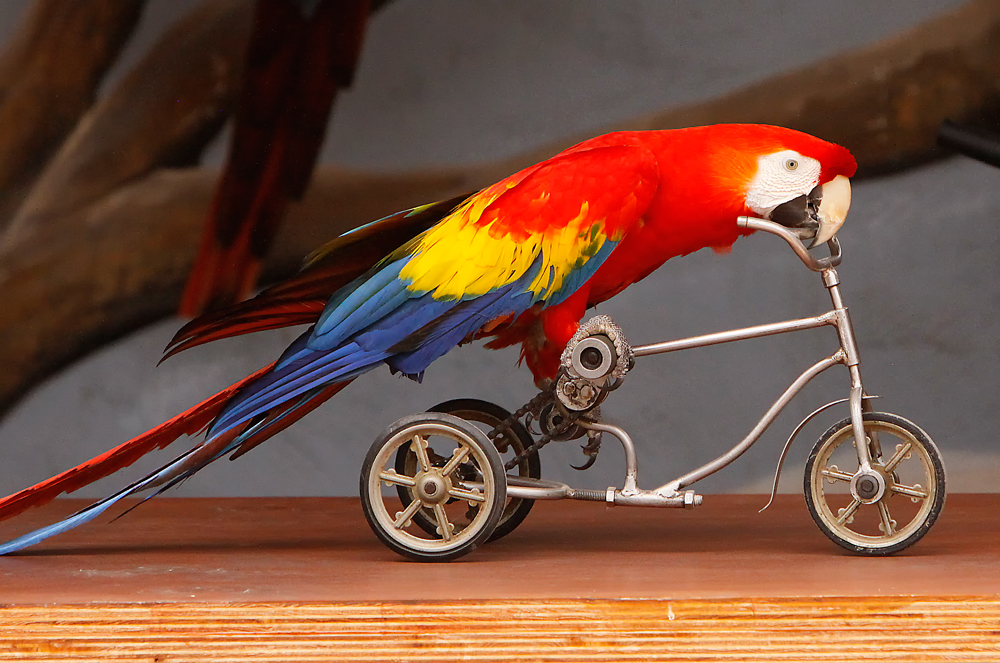
Scarlet macaw riding a tricycle at a show in Spain

Raptors from eagles to small falcons have for centuries been used in falconry, often to catch other birds, whether for pleasure or for food.

Cockfighting is an ancient spectator sport. It formed part of the culture of the ancient Indians, Chinese, Greeks, and Romans. It continues to be practised in South America and across South and Southeast Asia, often combined with betting on the result. It is practised in religious ceremonies in Hindu temples in Bali, but is now banned in many countries on grounds of cruelty.

Pigeon racing involves releasing specially trained racing pigeons to return to their homes over a measured distance of between 100 and 1,000 kilometres (62 and 621 mi). The sport was popularised in Belgium in the 19th century, and is now competitive worldwide. Also in Belgium and Flanders is vinkensport, in which participants have male chaffinches compete to make the most bird calls in an hour.

Birdwatching has since the nineteenth century become a major leisure activity. Millions of people around the world, amounting to nearly half of all households in some developed countries, put out birdfeeders to attract birds to their gardens or windowsills, at a cost of billions of dollars each year.

=== As pets ===
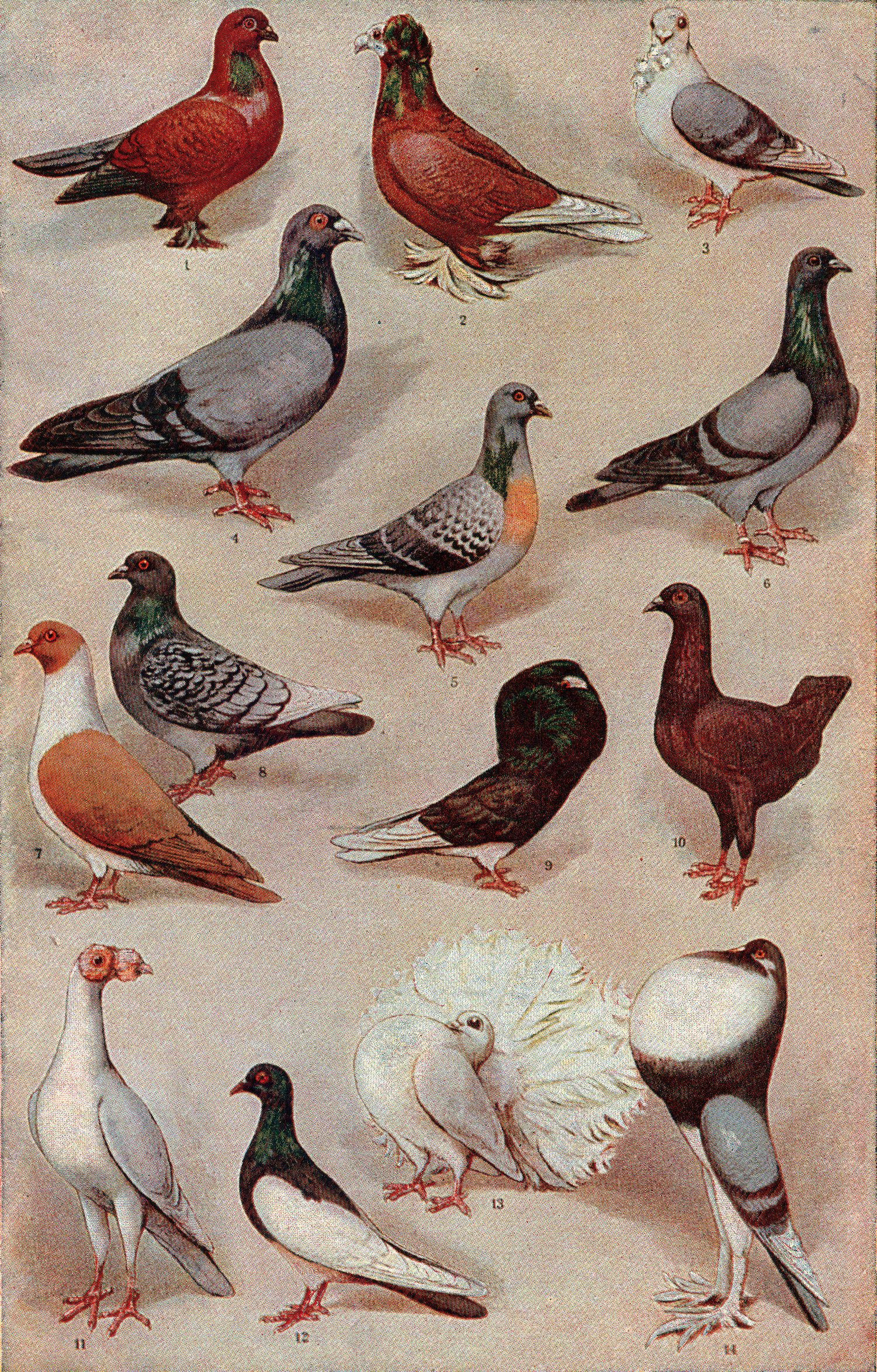
Charles Darwin noted that pigeon fanciers had created many kinds of pigeon, such as Tumblers (1, 12), Fantails (13), and Pouters (14) by selective breeding.

Cagebirds such as canaries, budgerigars, cockatoos, lovebirds, quails, finches, and parrots (companion parrots) are popular pets, whether for their song, their behaviour, their colourful plumage, or their ability to mimic speech. Among reasons for their popularity is that they can be kept in homes too small or otherwise unsuitable for dogs or cats. The cagebird trade in some parts of the world threatens certain species with extinction, when birds are illegally captured in the wild. For example, in Indonesia, at least 13 species are close to extinction including the Indonesian national bird, the Javan hawk-eagle, while five subspecies including the scarlet-breasted lorikeet may have become extinct in the wild.

Pet birds are kept in their millions, as are domestic fowls, bantams, and pigeons. These last had an important effect on evolutionary biology, as Charles Darwin took an especial interest in pigeon fancying, adopted the hobby himself, and made use of the wide variation between breeds as an argument for the power of selection in his 1859 Origin of Species.

== Symbolic uses ==
=== Inspiration ===
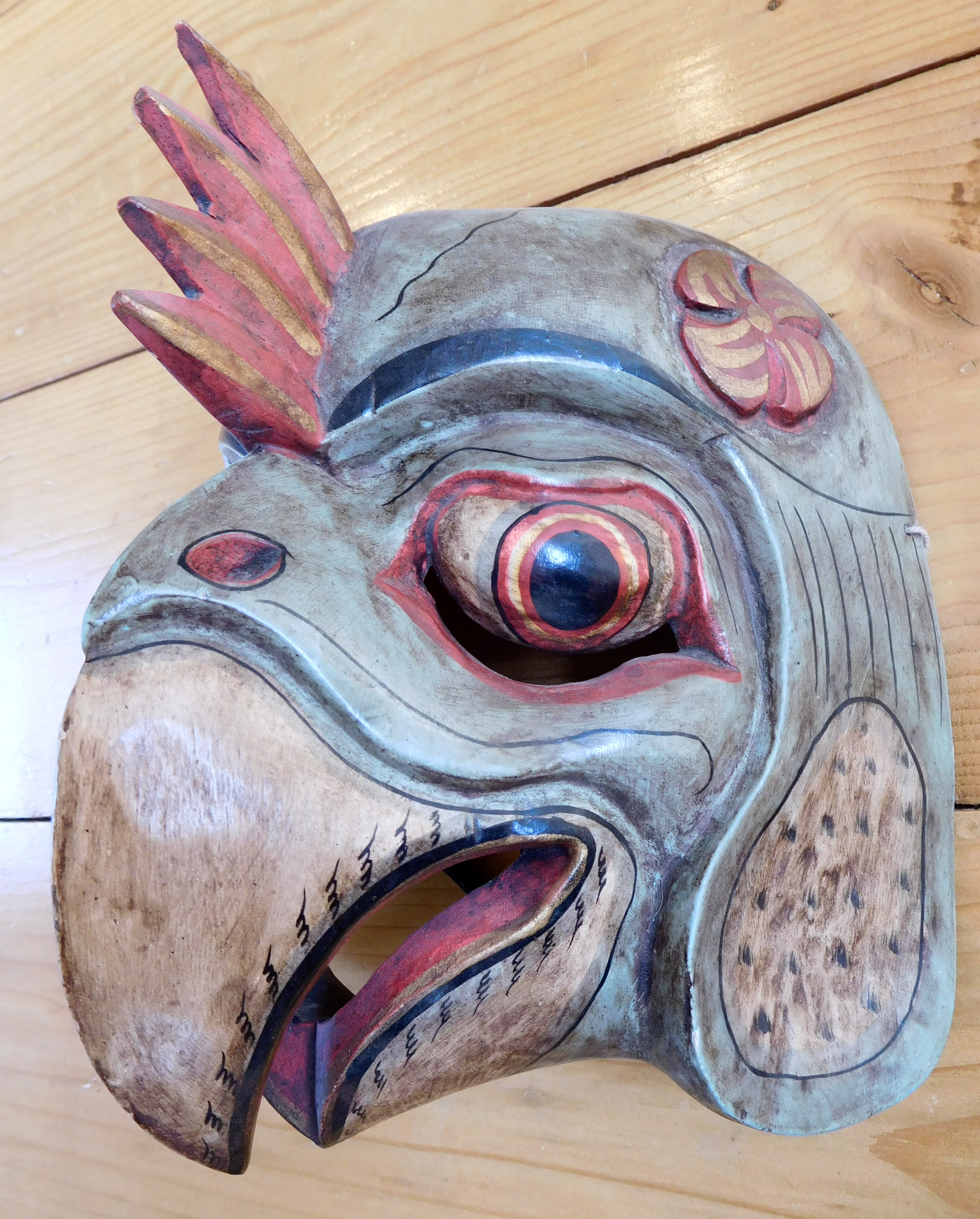
Wooden mask in the form of a chicken. Bali, late 20th century

The nature writers Mark Cocker and Richard Mabey, reviewing people's love of birds, observe that people are touched by feelings for birds in a variety of ways, such as enjoying the lapwing's "joyous display", or the "beauty and mystery" of the tawny owl's call on a cold winter's night. They argue that people feel the simple companionship of birds, are inspired by them to create art, let them mark the seasons and provide a sense of place, and use them "as symbols of joy and love". A former statesman, Edward Grey, 1st Viscount Grey of Fallodon, was able to express his feeling for birds in his 1927 book The Charm of Birds. Such feelings, in turn, have stimulated the intention to conserve birds and their habitats. Around the same time as Grey was writing, the first conservation organisations were coming into being, starting in Britain, triggered by the rapid disappearance of familiar species as they were captured for their feathers or for food. A substantial folklore rich in symbolism has accrued around birds; it was documented early in the 20th century as something that was already fading from memory. For example, the house sparrow has been associated with "sex and lechery" since ancient Egypt, where libidinousness was written with the sparrow hieroglyph. In the same vein, in the classical era the sparrow was sacred to the goddess of love, Aphrodite or Venus; the sparrow features in an erotic poem by Catullus for the same reason. Chaucer describes the summoner in his Canterbury Tales as being as "lecherous as a sparwe".

Studies have shown how important birds are to individual societies, touching on all aspects of life. In Andean societies such as the Moche (1–800 AD), Nazca (100–700 AD) and Chimu (1150–1450 AD), bright parrot and macaw feathers were traded from the Amazon rainforest to the mountains and the Pacific coast, while guano was collected as a fertiliser, and artists and craftsmen were inspired to create textiles, metal jewellery, and ceramics depicting condors, cormorants, ducks, hummingbirds, owls, vultures, and waders. Their religions, too, endowed birds with symbolic meaning.

The Audubon society, reviewing the importance of birds in 2013, obtained statements from many people with differing perspectives. Among them, the society's science director, Gary Langham, noted that what is good for birds is also good for humans. The writer David Allen Sibley observed that birds bring a little wildness into parks and gardens. The writer Barbara Kingsolver noted that birds are part of life on earth. The actress Jane Alexander wrote "Birds remind us that there are angels." The forensic ornithologist Carla Dove noted that birds are biological indicators of habitat health, climate change, and the coming of spring.

=== Symbolism and heraldry ===
A Red-footed falcon and a Grey parrot are used as supporters in the Coat of arms of São Tomé and Príncipe, an example of birds in heraldry.

Birds have been seen as symbols, and used as such, though perceptions of bird species vary widely across cultures: some birds have a positive image in some regions, a negative image in others.

Owls are associated with bad luck, witchcraft, and death in parts of Africa, but are regarded as wise across much of Europe. Hoopoes were considered sacred in Ancient Egypt and symbols of virtue in Persia, but were thought of as thieves across much of Europe, and harbingers of war in Scandinavia.

In heraldry, birds, especially eagles, often appear in coats of arms. In Britain, over 3000 pubs have birds in their names, sometimes commemorating a local family with a bird from their coat of arms, sometimes for other reasons. There are dozens of pubs named "Crow's Nest" (nautical), "Dog & Duck" (wildfowling), "Eagle & Child" (heraldic), and "Falcon" (heraldic, or falconry), while over 600 pubs are named for swans.

Birds, too, may symbolise human attributes such as stupidity or talkativeness. People have been called "birdbrain[ed]" or "cuckoo", among many other animal epithets. Birds feature prominently in often derogatory similes like "noisy as a goose" and metaphors including "to parrot".

=== Mythology and religion ===
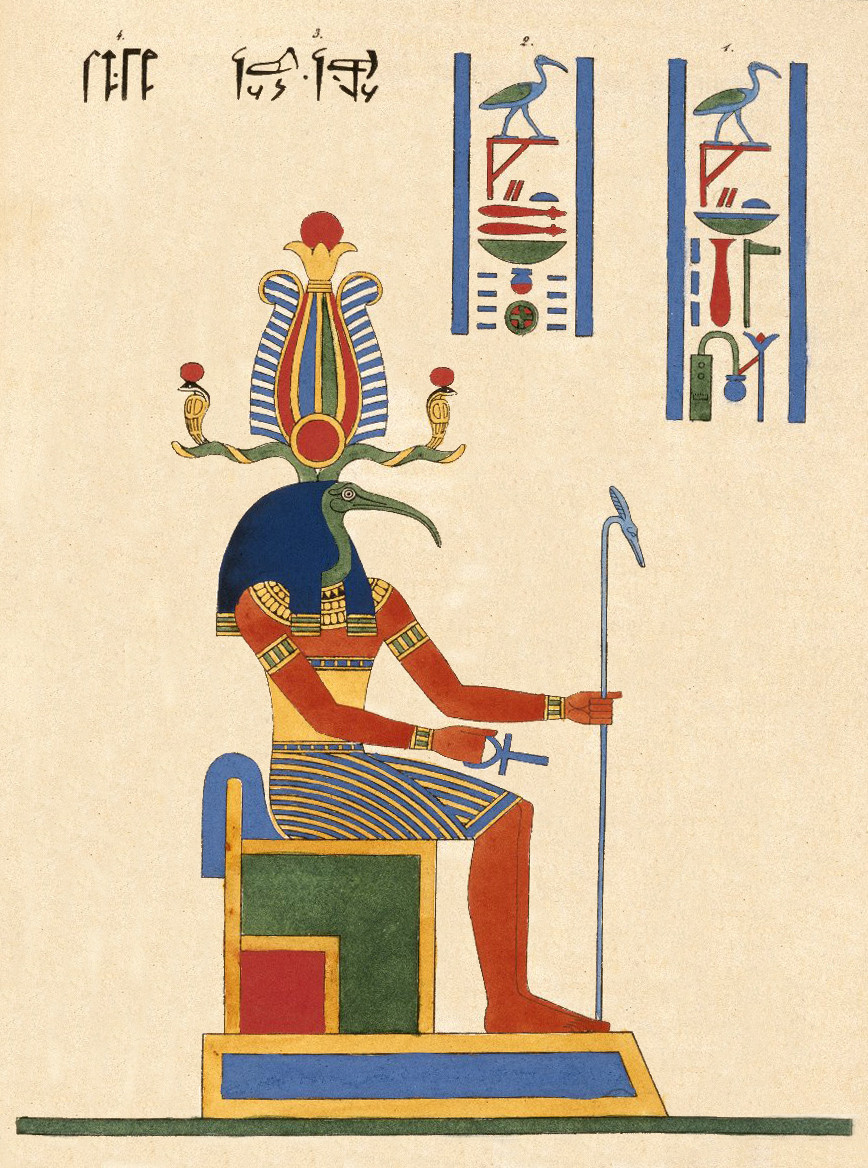
Thoth, the Ibis-headed scribe of the gods.

Birds have appeared in mythology and religion in a variety of guises.

Birds have featured as gods from the time of ancient Egypt, where the sacred ibis was venerated as a symbol of the god Thoth. In India, the peacock is perceived as Mother Earth among Dravidian peoples, while the Mughal and Persian emperors displayed their godlike authority by sitting in a Peacock Throne. In the Yazidi religion, Melek Taus the "Peacock Angel" is the central figure of their faith. In the cult of Makemake, the Tangata manu birds of Easter Island served as chiefs.

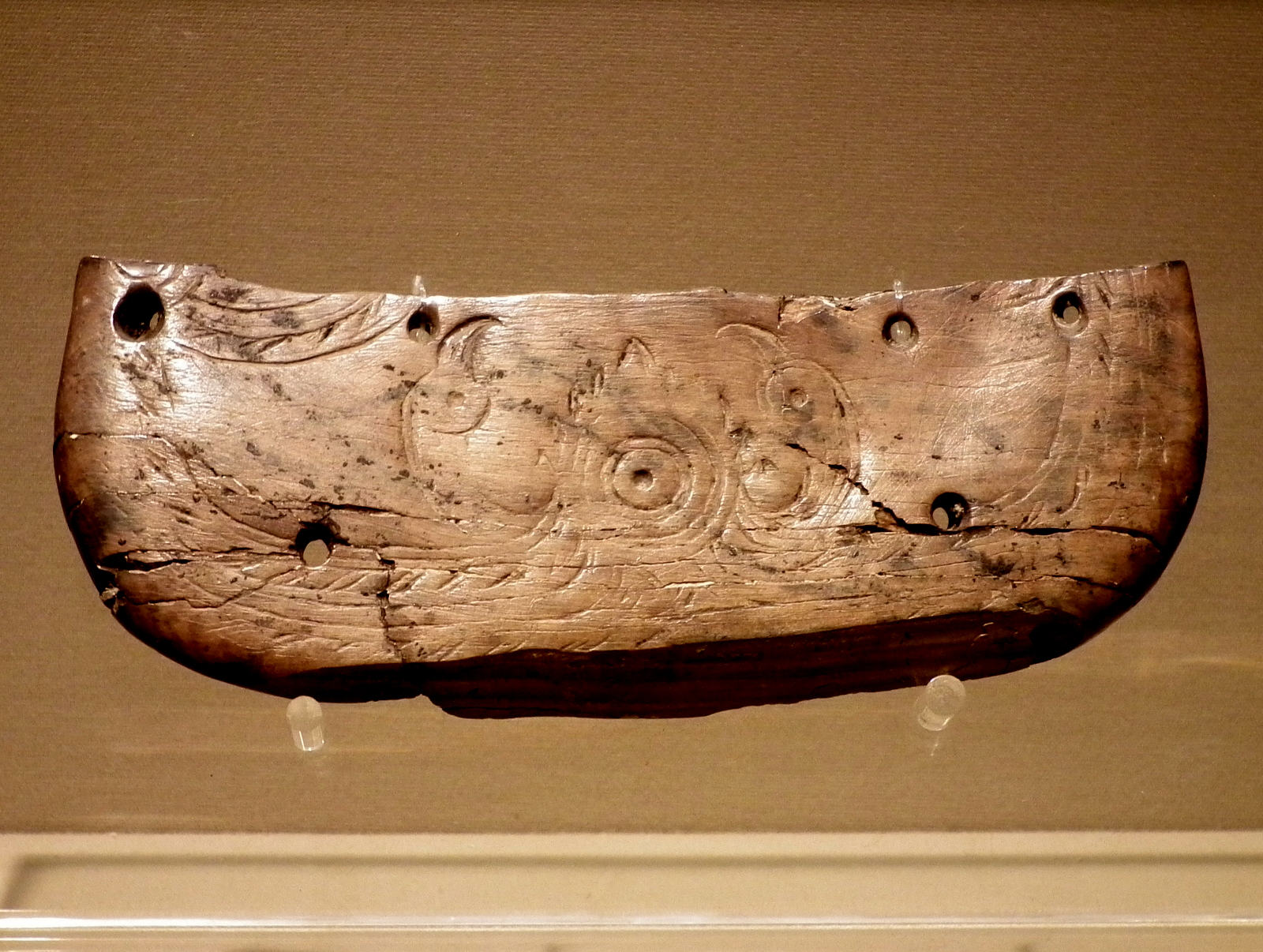
Butterfly-shaped ivory vessel with the pattern of two birds facing the sun, which demonstrates the sacred primitive belief of Hemudu people. Hemudu culture, c. 5500-3300 BC

Birds have been seen as spirit messengers of the gods. In Norse mythology, Hugin and Munin were ravens who whispered news into the ears of the god Odin. In the Etruscan and Roman religions of ancient Italy, priests were involved in augury, interpreting the words of birds while the "auspex" watched their activities to foretell events. In the Inca and Tiwanaku empires of South America, birds are depicted transgressing the boundaries between the earthly and underground spiritual realms. Indigenous peoples of the central Andes maintain legends of birds passing to and from metaphysical worlds. The mythical chullumpi bird is said to mark the existence of a portal between such worlds, and to transform itself into a llama. Among the Parsees of India and Iran, and among practitioners of Vajrayana Buddhism who believe in the transmigration of souls in Sikkim, Mongolia, Bhutan and Nepal, sky burial has been practiced for centuries. In this ritual, corpses are left exposed for griffon vultures to pick clean. The practice is declining, not least because of the loss of most of the vulture population across South Asia to accidental poisoning by the anti-inflammatory veterinary drug diclofenac.

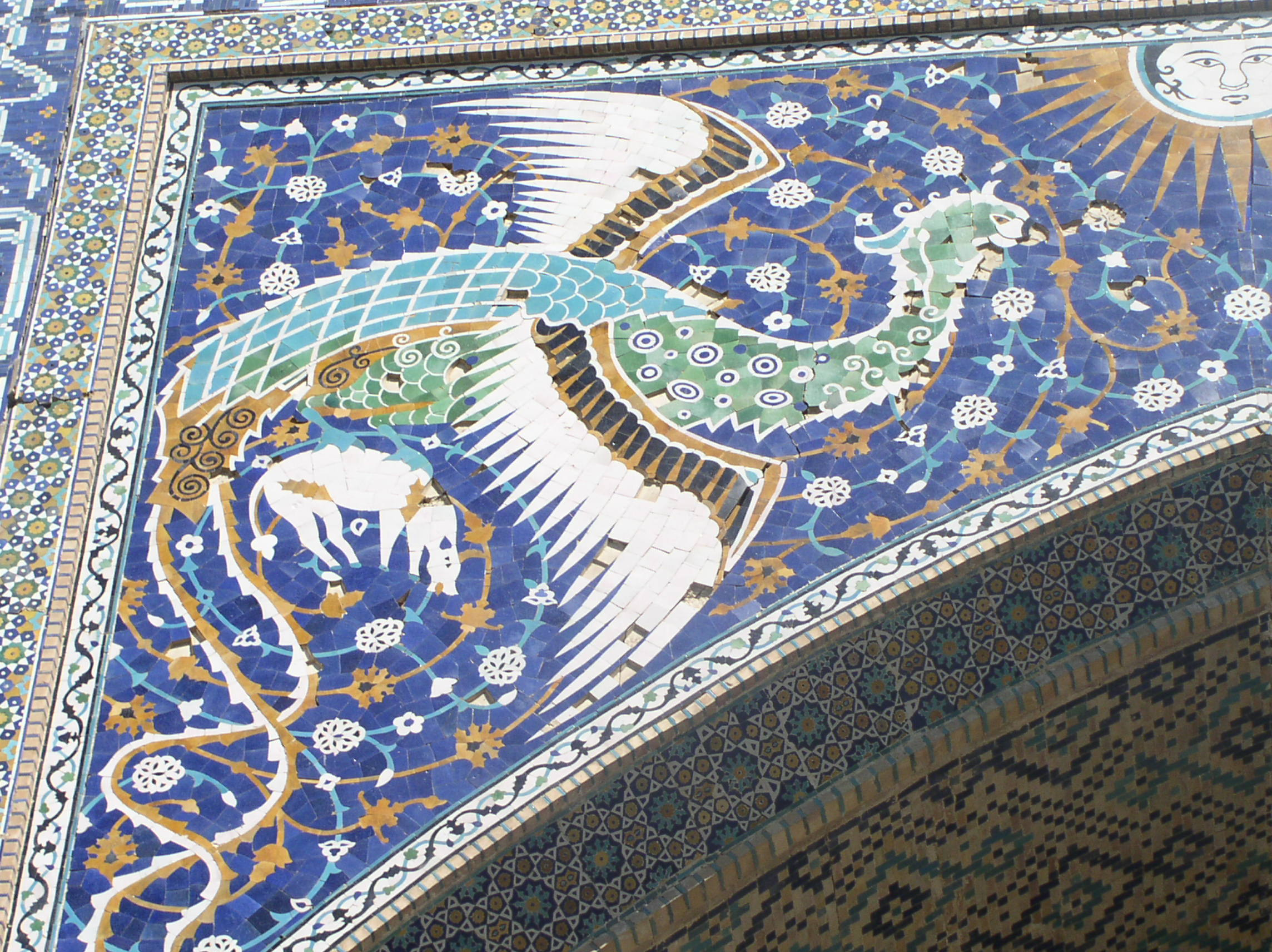
Simurgh in tilework on Nadir Divan-Beghi Madrasah, Bukhara, Uzbekistan

Birds have sometimes served as religious symbols. In ancient Mesopotamia, doves were prominent animal symbols of Inanna (later known as Ishtar), the goddess of love, sexuality, and war, and, in the ancient Levant, doves were used as symbols for the Canaanite mother goddess Asherah. In the Yoruba religion, white doves are seen as symbols of the creator deity Ọbatala. In ancient Greece, Athena, the goddess of wisdom and patron deity of the city of Athens, had a little owl as her symbol. In Greek iconography, Athena is often shown accompanied by an owl and the owl was used as a symbol of Athens on Athenian coinage. In classical antiquity, doves were sacred to the Greek goddess Aphrodite, who absorbed this association with doves from Inanna-Ishtar. Aphrodite frequently appears with doves in ancient Greek pottery and, during Aphrodite's main festival, the Aphrodisia, her altars would be purified with the blood of a sacrificed dove.

In Medieval Christian iconography, the cormorant's "wing-drying" pose represents the Christian cross, and hence is a figure of Christ. In John Milton's Paradise Lost, on the other hand, the bird's cross-like pose is a travesty of Christ: "Then up he flew, and... Sat like a cormorant; yet not true life Thereby regained, but sat devising death To them who lived".

In mythology, birds were sometimes monsters, like the Roc and the Māori's Pouākai, a giant bird capable of snatching humans. In Persian mythology, the simurgh was a gigantic bird, the first to come into existence, and it nested on the tree of plant life that grew in the great ocean beside the tree of immortality. Its task was to shake the seeds of all the plants out of the tree.

=== In the arts ===
Birds have been depicted throughout the arts from the earliest times to the present, including in painting and sculpture, in literature, in music, in theatre, in traditional dance and ballet, and in film.

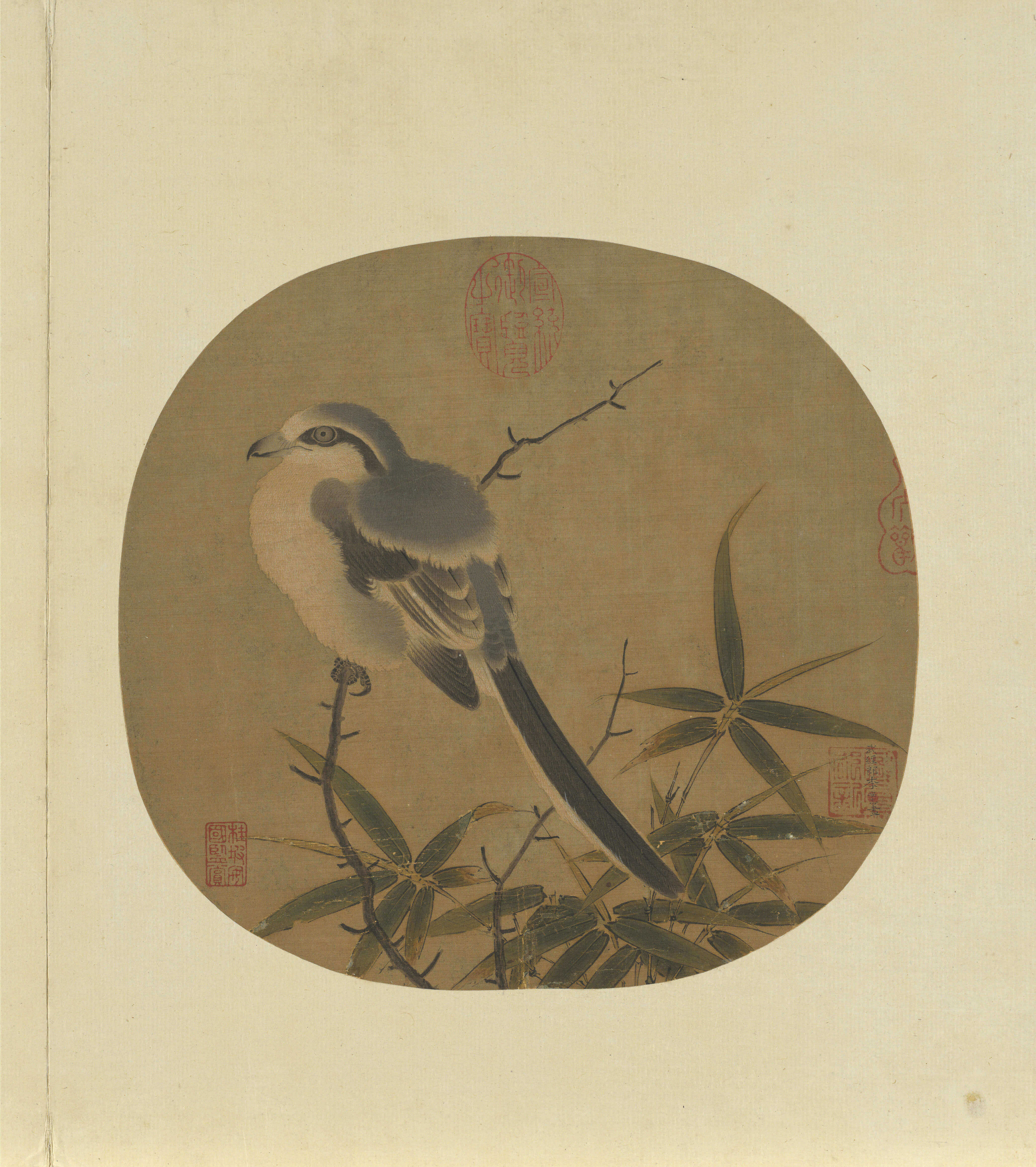
Bamboo and Shrike. Chinese bird-and-flower painting, 12th century. Album leaf, ink and colours on silk.

==== Painting and sculpture ====
Birds have been depicted in paintings, sculptures and other art objects from the earliest times, including in cave paintings.

In Chinese art, bird-and-flower painting forms one of the three major subjects (the others being landscapes and figures), from the time of the Five Dynasties in the 10th century. Huang Quan created the naturalistic xiesheng style for bird paintings. Birds have long been celebrated in the arts of Japan, including in painting, woodblock printing, cloisonné, ceramics and indeed poetry from the 18th and 19th centuries. Print artists like Utamaro and Hokusai made use of Western and Chinese influences to give a sophisticated effect, while Hiroshige reworked the traditional bird-and-flower genre.

In modern art, some of the paintings of Joan Miró include "A tangle of lines and small, colored ideograms suggesting birds, allegorical characters, stars, and animals". In modern sculpture, Pablo Picasso's 1932 bronze Coq (Cockerel) is an assemblage of "spiky, elongated forms."

In public statuary, the Magyars's mythical Turul symbolises national power and nobility, and is represented by many statues in Hungary, including the largest bird statue in the world, on a mountain near Tatabánya.

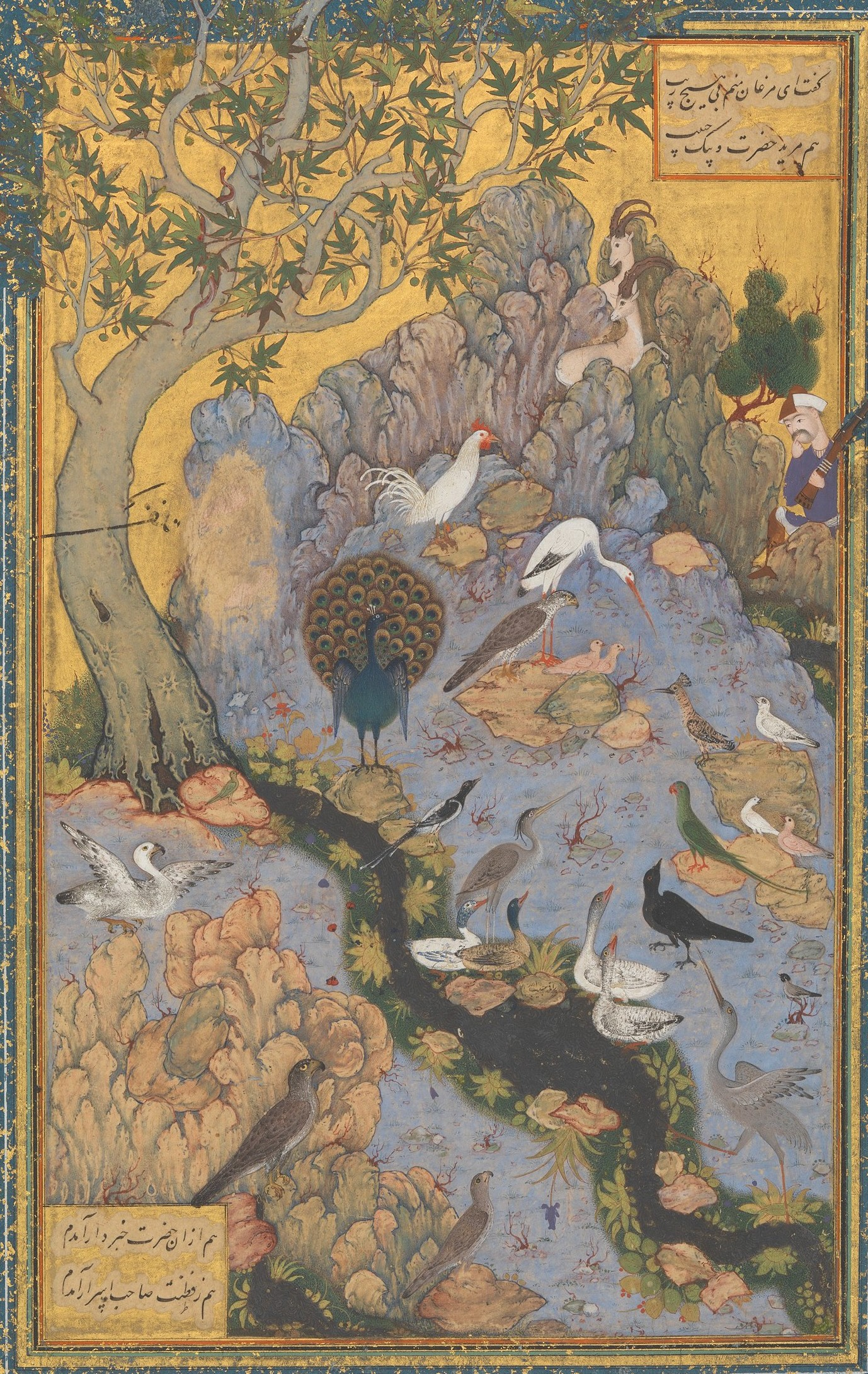
The Conference of the Birds by Farid al-Din Attar. Cover detail, Iran, c. 1610

==== Poetry ====
Birds have been celebrated in poetry since ancient times, when for example the Roman poet Catullus wrote in one of his most famous works about a girl and her pet sparrow in Passer, deliciae meae puellae, "Sparrow, delight of my girl".

Birds featured in medieval poetry, for example forming the characters of the 1177 Persian poem The Conference of the Birds, where the birds of the world assemble under the wisest bird, the hoopoe, to decide who is to be their king.

In English romantic poetry, John Keats's 1819 "Ode to a Nightingale" and Percy Bysshe Shelley's 1820 "To a Skylark" are popular classics. Bird poems by Gerard Manley Hopkins include "Sea and Skylark" and "The Windhover" (on the kestrel). More recently, Ted Hughes's 1970 collection of poems about a bird character, "Crow", is considered one of his most important works.

==== Prose ====
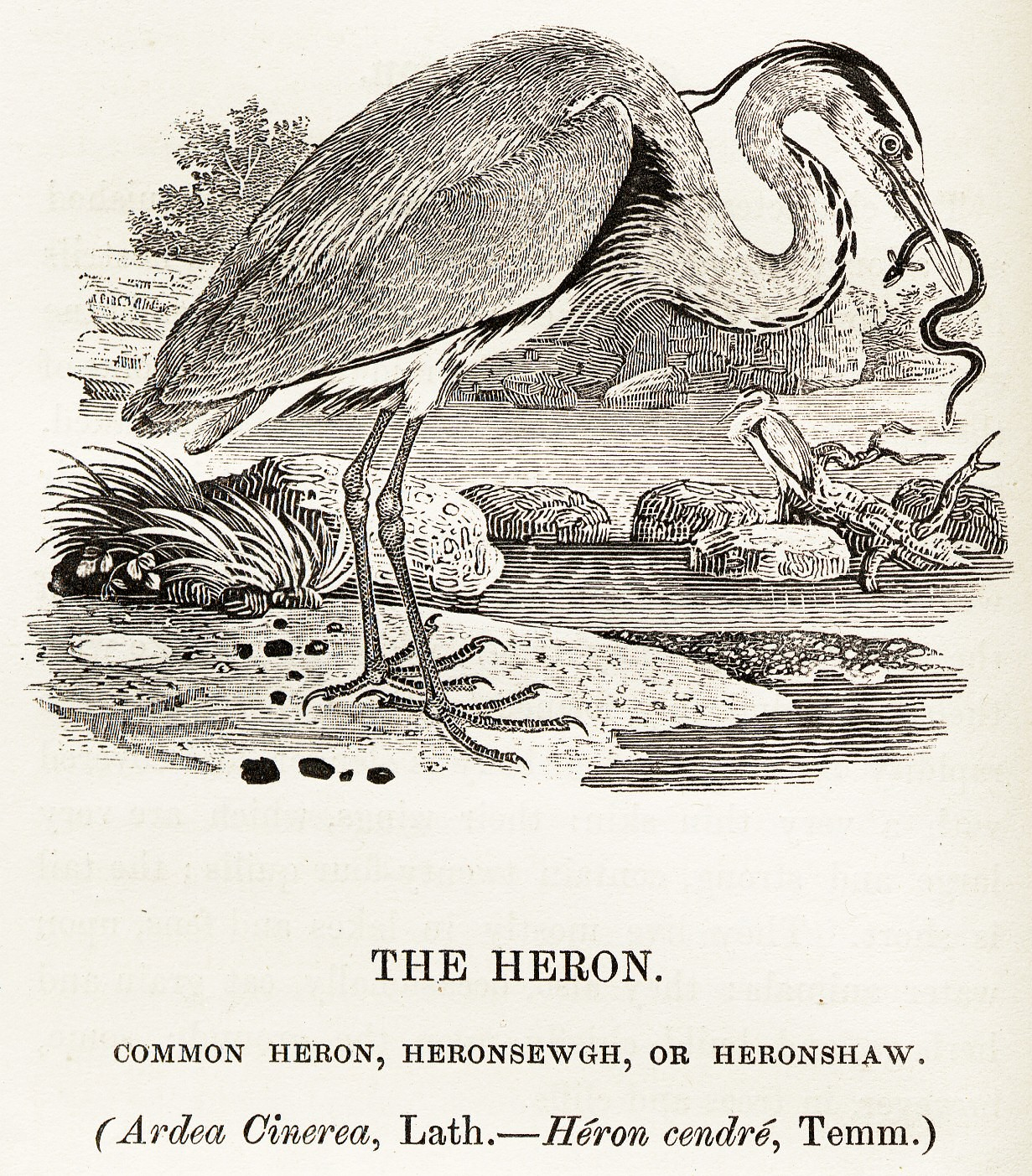
Wood engraving of a heron in Thomas Bewick's 1797–1804 A History of British Birds

Birds have similarly appeared in literature from ancient times. Among Aesop's Fables are The Wolf and the Crane and The Fox and the Stork; these fables, which have analogues in eastern traditions such as the Buddhist Javasakuna Jataka, use birds to imply moral conclusions about human behaviour.

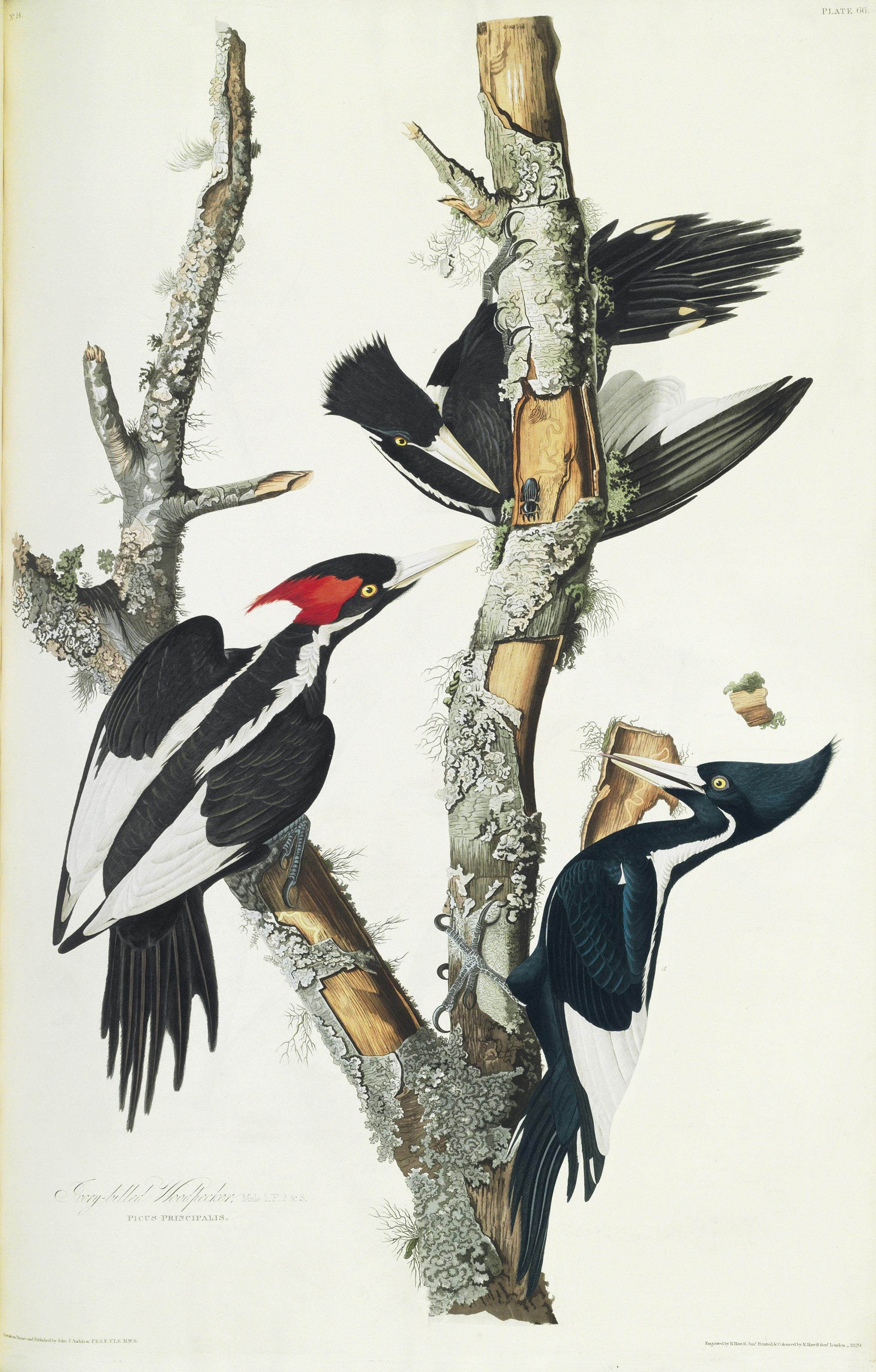
Ivory-billed woodpecker from Audubon's 1827–1838 Birds of America

More recently, birds have appeared in books illustrated by some artists, producing detailed images using updated printing techniques. The wood engraver Thomas Bewick's 1797–1804 A History of British Birds brought affordable illustrations to the public for the first time, and the book formed in effect the first field guide to birds, while John James Audubon's large-scale illustrations of birds in his 1827–1838 Birds of America received praise from art critics and collectors: early editions fetch among the highest prices paid for any printed books. The ornithologist John Gould's bird illustrations, in books such as A Century of Birds hitherto unfigured from the Himalaya Mountains (1830–1833) with 80 plates, and his 7-volume The Birds of Australia (1840–1848) with 600 plates, related directly to his research, were noted for their scientific utility and detail.

Birds are popular characters in children's books, which are often carefully illustrated. Beatrix Potter's 1908 The Tale of Jemima Puddle-Duck created an enduringly designed bird heroine. Other authors followed with many bird characters in books for children of different ages.

In books for adults, birds may have symbolic or psychological significance. For instance, Paul Gallico's 1940 The Snow Goose: A Story of Dunkirk was a parable about the regenerative power of friendship in wartime; the goose symbolises both the hero, Rhayader, a wounded artist, and the world wounded by war. T. H. White's 1951 The Goshawk describes the author's "monstrous and often cruel battles" to train his bird of prey, while Helen Macdonald's 2014 H is for Hawk, which references White's book, tells how her obsession with the same species as a falconer helped her through the loss of her father.

==== Music ====
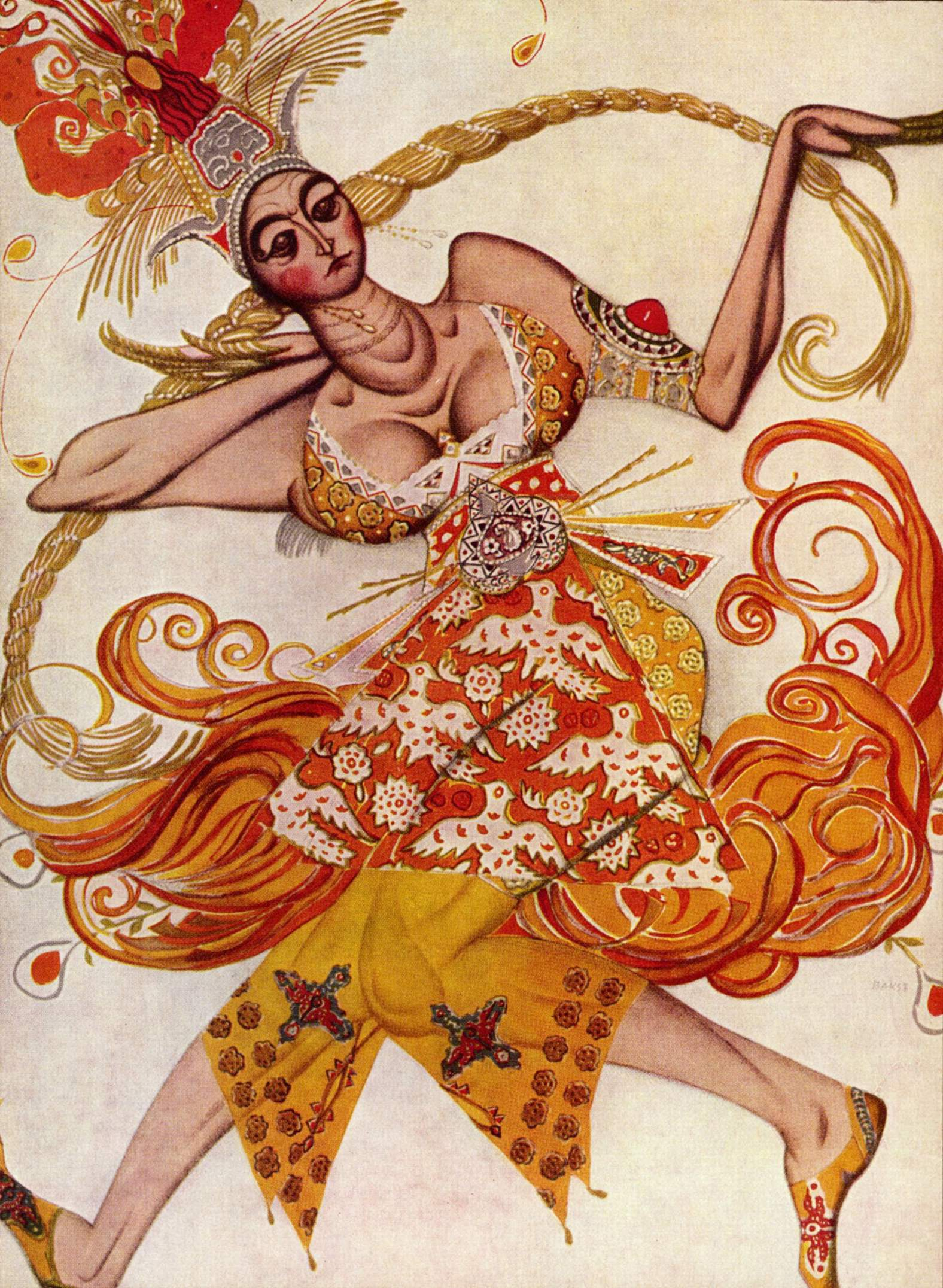
Ballerina in The Firebird by Léon Bakst, 1910

In music, birdsong has influenced composers and musicians in several ways: they can be inspired by birdsong; they can intentionally imitate bird song in a composition, as Vivaldi and Beethoven did, along with many later composers; they can incorporate recordings of birds into their works, first seen in the work of Ottorino Respighi; or as Beatrice Harrison did in 1924 with a nightingale, and David Rothenberg did in 2000 with a laughingthrush, they can duet with birds.

At least two groups of scientists, namely Luis Felipe Baptista and Robin A. Keister in 2005, and Adam Tierney and colleagues in 2011, have argued that birdsong has a similar structure to music. Baptista and Keister argue that the way birds use variations of rhythm, relationships of musical pitch, and combinations of notes is somewhat musical, perhaps because some birds exploit variation in song to avoid monotony, or mimic other species. Tierney argues that the similar motor constraints on human and avian song drive these to have similar song structures, including "arch-shaped and descending melodic contours in musical phrases", long notes at the ends of phrases, and typically small differences in pitch between adjacent notes.

==== Dance ====
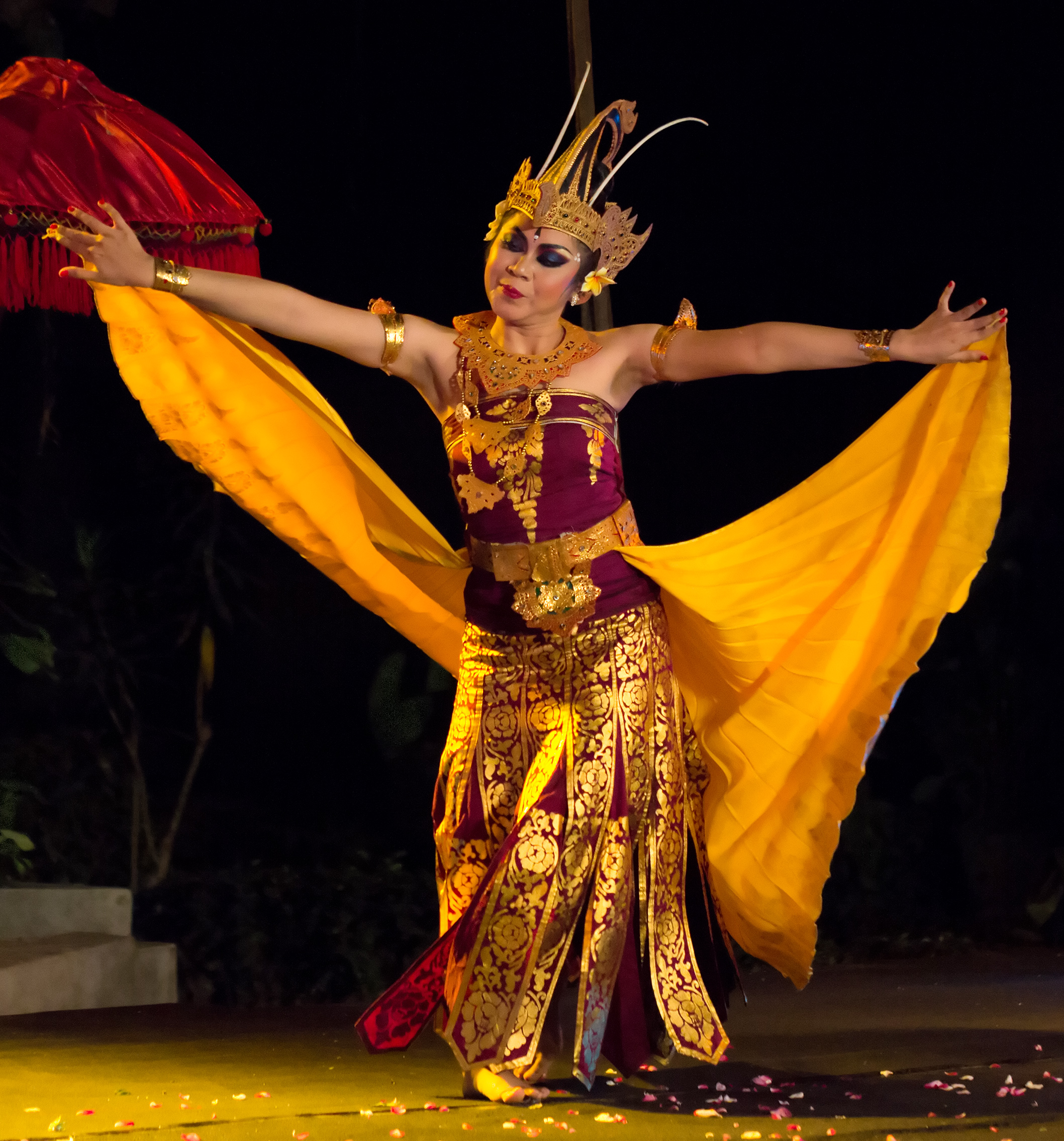
A dancer of the Balinese Sekar Jepun troupe performing the cendrawasih (bird-of-paradise) dance

Birds feature as central characters in dance traditions around the world. For example, Goldie's bird of paradise is celebrated in Papua New Guinea in a "beautiful" dance by two men who dress in grass skirts with the bird's plumes on the rump; they carry cassowary feathers in their hands and on their armbands, and imitate the bird's calls while they dance. It is performed on important occasions, carrying "special magic", and the performers are obliged to prepare for a week, avoiding certain foods, and undergoing a prolonged submergence in a cold stream to prepare their minds. The dance is preceded by a "magic chant" to the bird of paradise. In Balinese dance, the cendrawasih dance illustrates the bird-of-paradise's mating rituals.

In Africa, the Ewe people of Ghana, who were said to have been guided from Dahomey to Ghana by a bird, incorporate the flapping of the bird's wings in dances such as Agbadza, Atsiagbekor, and Gakpa.

In ballet, Tchaikovsky's classical 1895 Swan Lake and Igor Stravinsky's 1910 The Firebird have central bird characters.

==== The dramatic arts ====
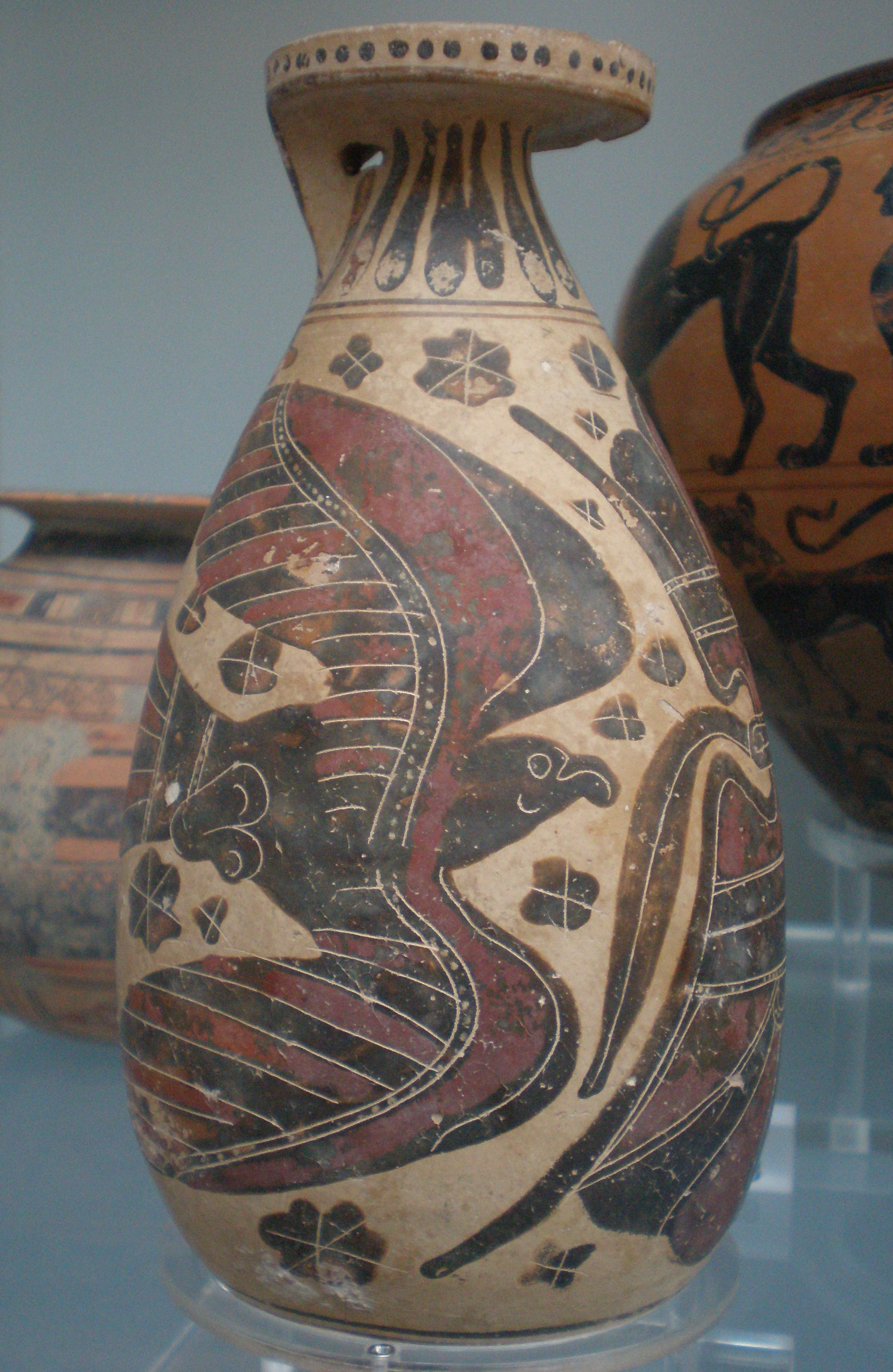
Ancient Greek bird: an alabastron, 600 BC

In theatre, Aristophanes's 414 BC comedy The Birds (Greek: Ὄρνιθες Ornithes) is an acclaimed fantasy with effective mimicry of birds. The play's chorus consists of characters playing many identifiable species, including the kingfisher, turtledove, and sparrowhawk; birds feature as messengers and dancers, and several Athenians are compared to specific birds.

In film, birds can feature as the major driving force in a story, as in Alfred Hitchcock's acclaimed 1963 The Birds. Loosely based on Daphne du Maurier's 1952 story of the same name, it tells the tale of sudden attacks on people by violent flocks of birds. A bird plays the role of an outlet for a person's feelings in Ken Loach's much admired 1969 Kes. The film is based on Barry Hines's 1968 novel A Kestrel for a Knave, and tells the story of a young boy who comes of age by training a kestrel that he has taken from the nest.

Birds feature also in the mass media with iconic animated cartoon characters such as Walt Disney's Donald Duck, Warner Bros.'s Tweety Pie, and Walter Lantz's Woody Woodpecker. The species involved are not always discernible, though Woody has been claimed to be based on the acorn or pileated woodpeckers.

== Conservation ==
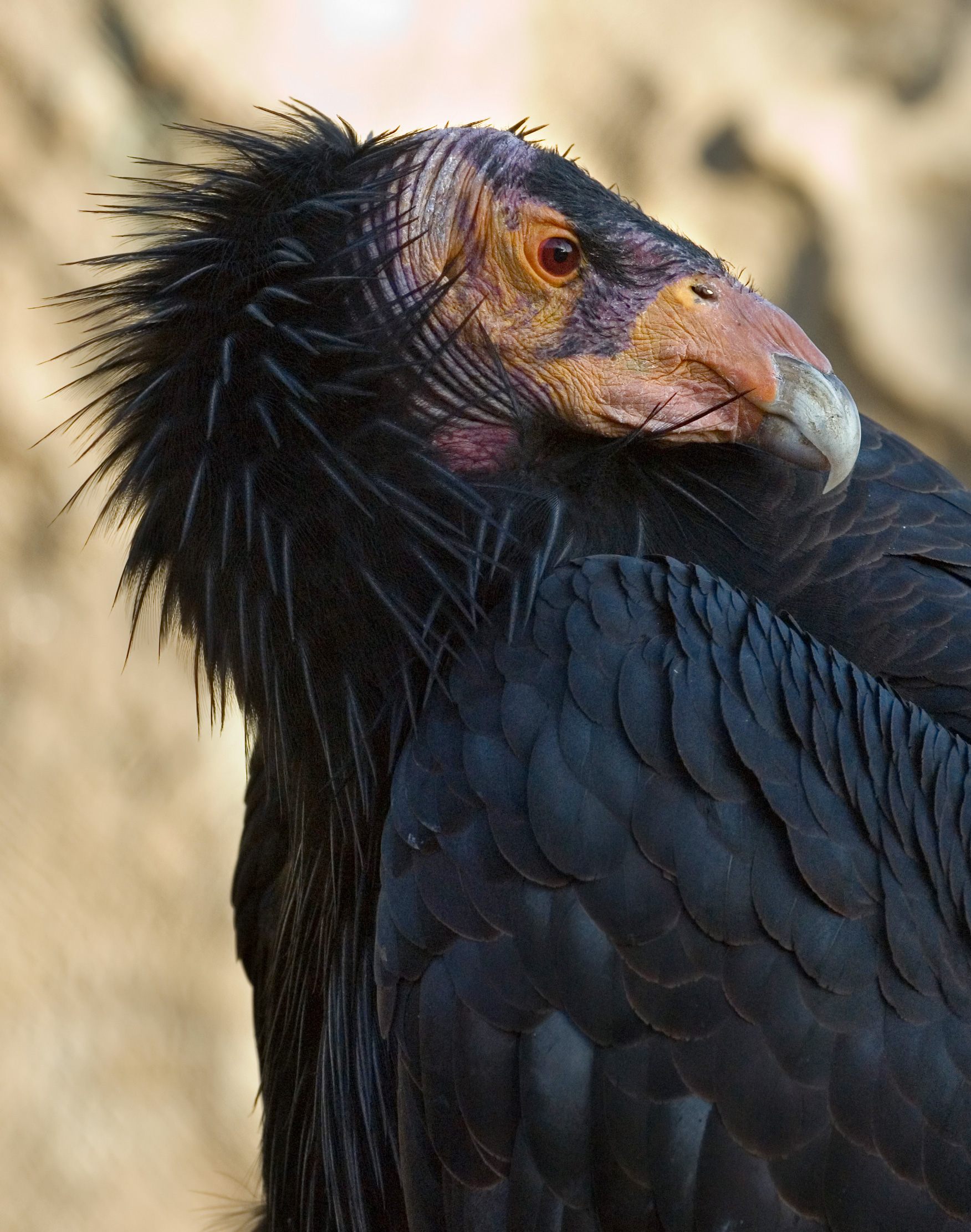
The California condor once numbered only 22 birds, but conservation measures have raised that to over 300 today.

Though human activities have allowed the expansion of a few species, such as the barn swallow and European starling, they have caused population decreases or extinction in many other species. Over a hundred bird species have gone extinct in historical times, including the dodo and the great auk, although the most dramatic human-caused avian extinctions, eradicating an estimated 750–1800 species, occurred during the human colonisation of Melanesian, Polynesian, and Micronesian islands. Many bird populations are declining worldwide, with 1,227 species listed as threatened by BirdLife International and the IUCN in 2009.

The most commonly cited human threat to birds is habitat loss. Other threats include overhunting; collisions with buildings and vehicles; long-line fishing bycatch; pollution (including oil spills and pesticide use), competition; predation; hybridisation from nonnative introduced or invasive species; and climate change. The collection of specimens for taxidermy and eggs from the wild has at times had a serious effect on some species. It is now forbidden in many countries, such as by the British Wildlife and Countryside Act 1981.

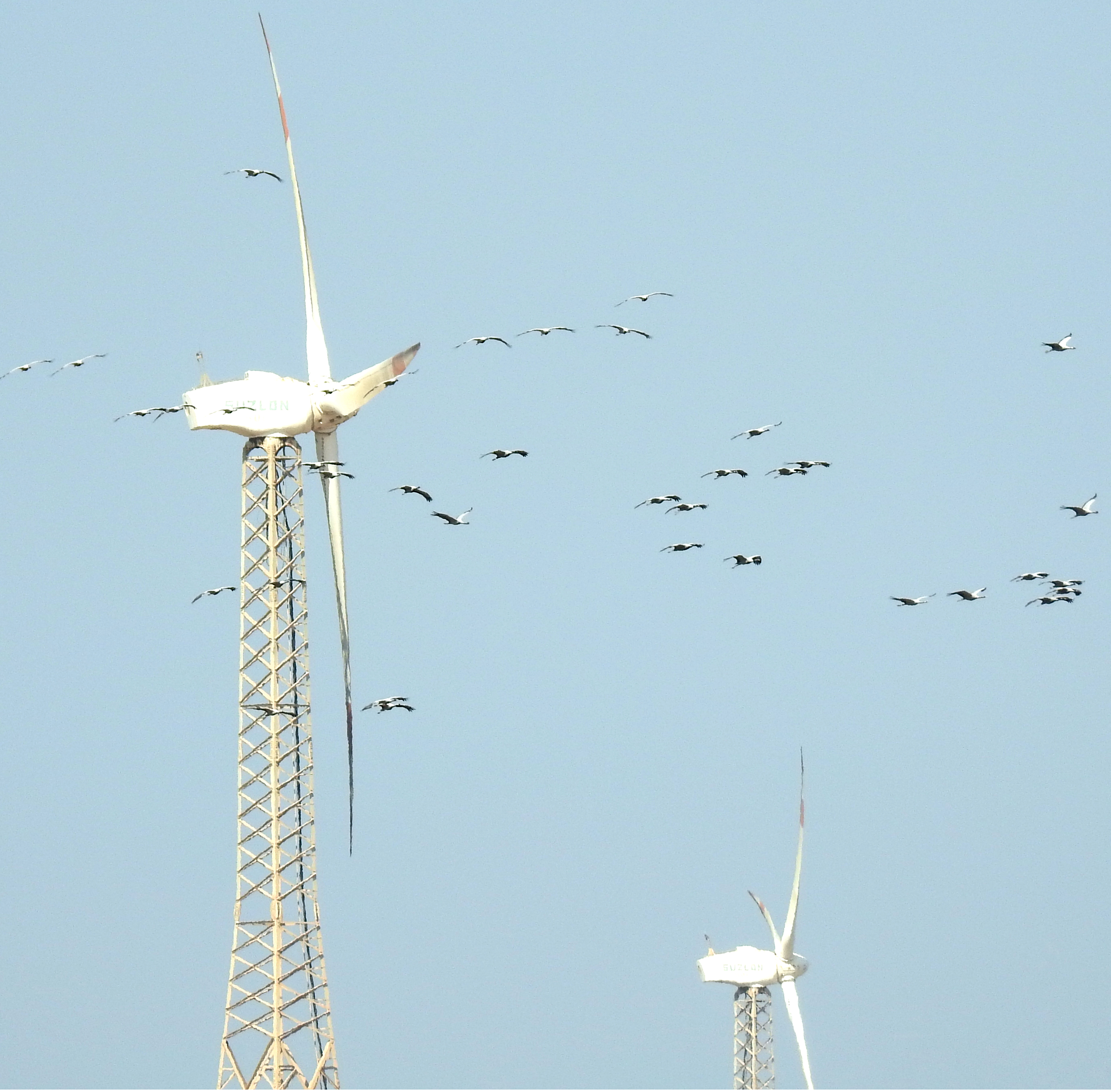
Demoiselle cranes flying past wind turbines, Gujarat

Poorly sited wind farms often result in the death of many birds in collisions. For example, at the Altamont Pass in California, the golden eagle has been reduced by 80%, and nesting has ceased in the area. The effects of wind farming are not entirely negative, as it does offset the greatest threat to birds, climate change. Thus, there is a trade-off in the siting of any wind farm.

Governments and conservation groups work to protect birds, either by passing laws that preserve and restore bird habitat, or by establishing captive populations for reintroductions. Such projects have produced some successes; one study estimated that conservation efforts saved 16 species of bird that would otherwise have gone extinct between 1994 and 2004, including the California condor and Norfolk parakeet. The British Royal Society for the Protection of Birds, founded as the Plumage League in 1889 to protect birds such as the egret from hunting for their plumes, used in fashion, has grown to have over a million members; it has been followed by similar societies in other countries. A more specialised organisation, the Wildfowl & Wetlands Trust founded in 1946, works to conserve waterfowl and their wetland habitats, with projects around the world.

== See also ==
- Human–dinosaur coexistence
