= Dog and Duck =

Dog and Duck may refer to:

- Dog and Duck, Soho, a pub in Soho, London
- Dog and Duck, St George's Fields, a tavern in London, popular in the 17th and 18th centuries
- Dog and Duck (TV series), a British pre-school children's television show that was broadcast on CITV between 1999 and 2001
