= Legendary bird =

Legendary bird may refer to

- Any bird that appears in legends, mythology, and religion
  - Category:Legendary birds
  - Category:Birds in mythology
- Articuno, Zapdos, and Moltres from the Pokémon series
