= Swan trade =

In addition to their trade in beaver fur, the Hudson's Bay Company also traded swans, and sometimes geese, for their skins and quills in the 18th and 19th centuries; the skins were then sent to Europe. The population of trumpeter swans east of the Rockies in the 1600s was estimated at 130,000. Annually, between three and five thousand swans were killed, which greatly contributed to the decline of trumpeter and tundra swans to the point where they were very scarce in the interior of North America. The skins were marketed for European garments and the quills were marketed for quill pens. Pens made out of swan quills were first sold by bundles of 25 or 100 to the London market in 1736. In 1837, 1,259,000 quills from both swans and geese were sold in London. Ten quills were taken from each swan or goose, resulting in the sacrifice of over 100,000 swans and geese in that year alone from Rupert’s Land. Powder puffs for women, coat-linings, vests, ceremonial robes, ornaments, boas, wallets, caps, jackets, quilts, pillows and mattresses are among the many items crafted with swan skins and quills.
