= Dog and Duck, Soho =

Pub in Soho, London

The Dog and Duck
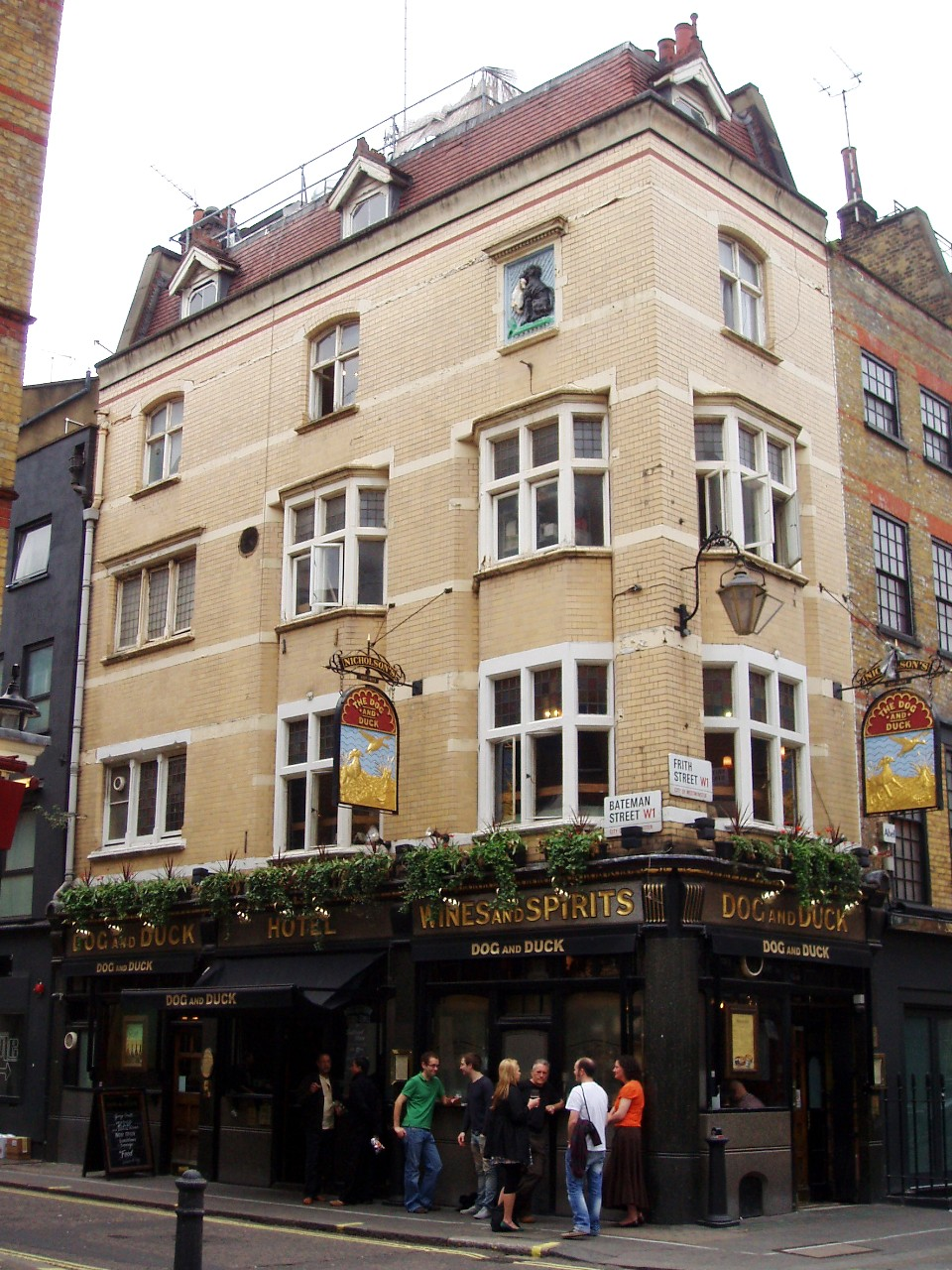
- The Dog and Duck
- Location: 18 Bateman Street, Soho, London W1D 3AJ
- Coordinates: 51°30′50″N 0°7′55″W
- Built: 1897
- Architect: Francis Chambers

Listed Building – Grade II
- Official name: THE DOG AND DUCK PUBLIC HOUSE
- Designated: 24-Feb-1989
- Reference no.: 1264051

The Dog and Duck is a Grade II listed public house at 18 Bateman Street, Soho, London W1D 3AJ, built in 1897 by the architect Francis Chambers for Cannon Brewery.

It is on the Campaign for Real Ale's National Inventory of Historic Pub Interiors. The pub has an upstairs dining room named after the writer George Orwell, who was a regular. Other patrons include Madonna and the Prince and Princess of Wales.
