= Ray Ciarrocchi =

New York-based figurative painter

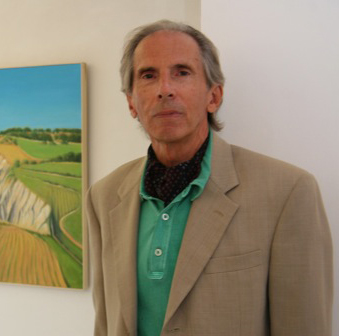
- Born: Ramon William Ciarrocchi; August 23, 1933 (age 93); Chicago, Illinois
- Education: Washington University in St. Louis; Boston University
- Known for: Painter
- Movement: Figurative Painter
- Spouse: Sandra Caplan

Ray Ciarrocchi is a New York-based figurative painter. Ciarrocchi has presented numerous solo exhibitions in New York, additional US cities and Italy as well as dozens of group exhibitions in varied locations and venues. His paintings, watercolors, drawings and monotypes are in many museum and private collections both nationally and abroad.

== Background ==
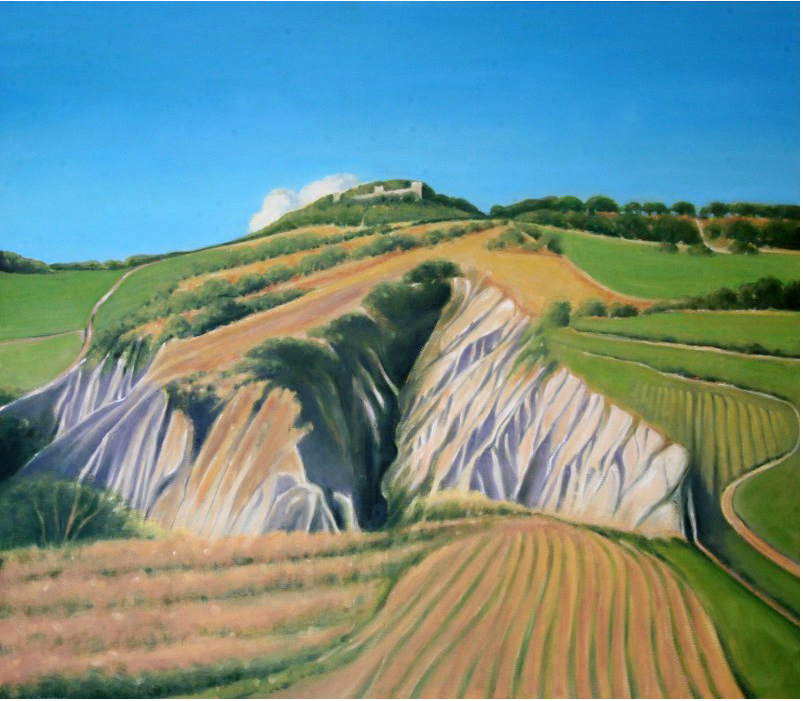
Ray Ciarrocchi, August, 2010, oil on linen

Ray Ciarrocchi, the son of Italian immigrants from Tuscany and Marche, was born Ramon William Ciarrocchi in Chicago, IL on August 23, 1933. As a child he enjoyed drawing and during high school attended classes at the Art Institute of Chicago where he was influenced by the French Impressionists works that form a significant part of the museum's collection. After high school he enrolled and studied for two years at the Chicago Academy of Fine Arts with the idea that he might eventually work as an illustrator. Military service kept him from completing his studies but brought valuable experience as Ciarrocchi was assigned to three years duty in Tokyo, Japan as an illustrator. In Tokyo he was fortunate to meet and become friends with the writer Oliver Statler, who introduced him to Isamu Noguchi and the British ceramist Bernard Leach. Studying Zen painting and attending performances and sketching at the Kabuki Theatre with its splendid color were influential in Ciarrocchi's decision to become a painter.

Following his discharge from the army, Ciarrocchi returned to college and earned a BFA from Washington University where he studied painting with Fred Conway and guest critic Stephen Pace. Pace, who later became a friend and mentor, was a strong influence imparting, among other things, his knowledge of Hans Hoffman’s visual concepts. Ciarrocchi went on to receive an MFA at Boston University where he studied with David Aaronson. While at Boston University he established rapport with fellow students Brice Marden and Kent Floeter.

Moving to New York City during 1961, Ciarrocchi continued painting as an abstract expressionist, influenced by DeKooning’s black and white period. He became acquainted with several of the painters who were associated with the Howard Wise Gallery including Edward Dugmore and Ernest Briggs.

A Fulbright Grant during 1963-64 made possible a year’s study and independent work in Florence, Italy. Seeing first-hand the work of artists Piero della Francesca and the Venetians Giorgione and Veronese, strongly influenced Ciarrocchi’s visual thinking. Living in Fiesole, above Florence, he began to draw and paint from nature, stressing the abstract figuration of the natural forms. The warm bright quality of the Italian light became a standard component of his work that continues in his current paintings.

Ciarrocchi, even when working abstractly, continued to draw from the nude. His acquaintance with Gregory Gillespie, another Fulbright artist, provided numerous discussions concerning the possibilities of figurative painting. Returning to New York he was able to draw from life with groups of artists including Diana Kurz, Lois Dodd and Regina Granne. He also established friendships with Jack Tworkov, Hermine Ford, Robert Moskowitz, Lennart Anderson, Sonia Gechtoff and Rackstraw Downes.

After his return to New York from Italy Ciarrocchi saw and was influenced by a large exhibition of Bonnard’s paintings held at Acquavella Gallery. Additional painters whose works he studies are Vuillard, Fairfield Porter, Edwin Dickinson and Filippo DePisis.

During summers spent in Maine, Ciarrocchi began to work and complete each painting directly from nature. Ciarrocchi now develops his paintings in the studio working from sketches and studies made at various sites as he divides his time between New York and Italy.

== Career ==
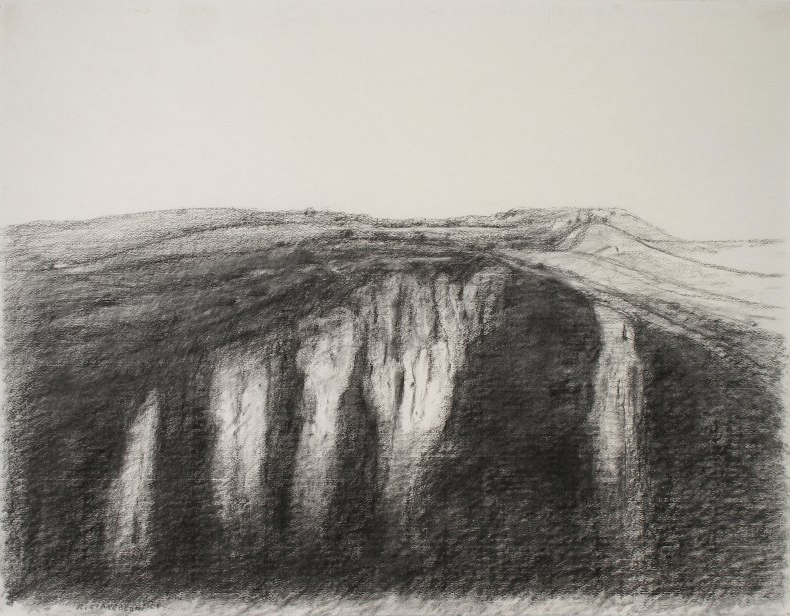
Ray Ciarrocchi, Cliffs, 2014, charcoal and white pastel on paper, 25" × 33"

Ciarrocchi's first one-person exhibition was with the Tibor DeNagy Gallery during 1971. This was followed by seven additional exhibitions at the same gallery, the last taking place in 1985. Other exhibitions were with Fischbach Gallery, 1987 and 1989 and with Rich Perlow Gallery during 1993 and 1996. Ciarrocchi continues to exhibit both nationally and abroad. An exhibition entitled "Seeking the Darkness and the Light: Drawings of Italy," was held at the University of Richmond, Virginia in February 2015.

Lawrence Campbell, writing in ARTnews magazine about one of Ciarrocchi's exhibitions stated, "Ciarrocchi improvises brilliantly on natural textures---the foliage of trees, clouds and flower-bespattered meadows. Continually, the Natural edges into the Symbolist, shifting between the seen and the unseen." Richard Waller, in his catalog essay for "Ray Ciarrocchi: Landscapes 1978-91," at University of Richmond Museums, writes: " Ciarrocchi’s landscapes are more about the exquisite moment of being in that place. His landscapes are at once aesthetic and metaphysical, achieving a unity of viewing nature with the transcendent power of that experience."

As a teacher Ciarrocchi has held positions at Pratt Institute, Columbia University, Parsons School of Design, Brooklyn College CUNY and Baruch College CUNY. He was a visiting artist at Maryland Institute College of Art and at the University of Guelph, Ontario, Canada.

His work is in numerous public, private, museum, corporate and governmental collections including:

- Brooklyn Museum
- Columbus Museum of Art
- The World Bank
- United States Department of State
- University of Massachusetts Amherst

== Grants received ==
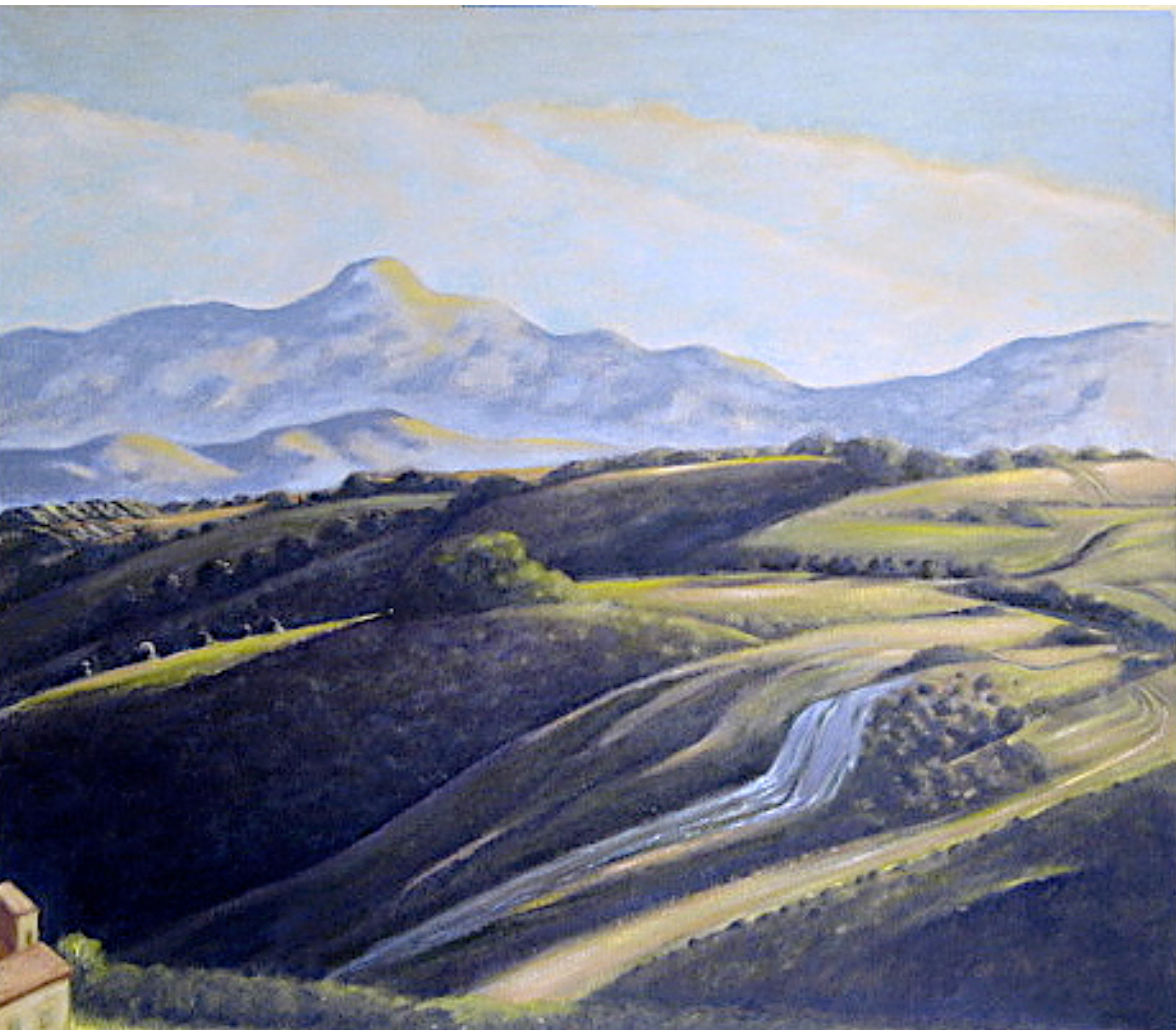
Ray Ciarrocchi, Appenines, 2012, oil on linen

- Fulbright Fellowship (Florence, Italy) 1963-64
- Gottlieb Foundation 1996
- Ingram Merrill Foundation 1977 and 1982
- Louis Comfort Tiffany Grant 1967
- MacDowell Colony 1962 and 1965
- Pollock-Krasner Foundation 2009 and 2014

== Publications ==
- Waller, Richard. "Seeking the Darkness and the Light: Drawings of Italy," February, 2015 (catalog essay)
- Clementoni, Simona. "Sentieri: Still Landscapes," September, 2009 (catalog essay)
- Tentarelli, Francesco. "Latitudes of Light: Pictorial Visions of America and Europe," August 2004 (catalog essay)
- Gladstone, Valerie. "Ray Ciarrocchi at Katharina Rich Perlow," ArtNews, November 1996.
- Mallory, Nina A. "Ray Ciarrocchi: Italian Landscapes," Katharina Rich Perlow Gallery, September 1996 (catalog essay)
- Bass, Ruth. "New York, New York!" Art-Talk, Scottsdale, Arizona, October 1996
- Raynor, Vivien. "Exhibit by Italian-Americans," New York Times, December 25, 1994
- Henry, Gerrit. "Ray Ciarrocchi at Katharina Rich Perlow." ArtNews, November 1993
- Waller, Richard. "Ray Ciarrocchi Landscapes 1978-1991," University of Richmond Museums, 1991
- Proctor, Roy. "Ciarrocchi’s Water Binds Land, Sky into Unity," The Richmond News Leader, November 23, 1991
- Merritt, Robert. "Ciarrocchi’s Painting Captures Response," The Richmond Times-Dispatch, November 16, 1991
- Campbell, Lawrence. "Ray Ciarrocchi at Fischbach," Art in America, October 1989
- Saez, Richard. "Ray Ciarrocchi at Tibor de Nagy," Arts, 1985
- Combs, Tram. "Ray Ciarrocchi, New Artist in Town," The Woodstock Times, February 3, 1983
- Mallory, Nina A. "Ray Ciarrocchi at Tibor de Nagy," Arts, January 1983
- Beem, Edgar Allen. "Ray Ciarrocchi: Nijinsky – A View," Art – New England, July/August, Volume 2, No.8, 1981
- Lubell, Ellen, "Ray Ciarrocchi at Tibor de Nagy," SoHo News, February 23, 1978
- Frank, Peter. "Ray Ciarrocchi at Tibor de Nagy," ArtNews, September 1976
- Kannenstine, Lou. "Ray Ciarrocchi at Tibor de Nagy," The 57th Street Review, March 1976
- Campbell, Lawrence. "Ray Ciarrocchi at Tibor de Nagy," ArtNews, April 1974
- Kramer, Hilton. "SoHo: Figures At An Exhibition," The New York Times, March 2, 1974
- Lubell, Ellen. "Ray Ciarrocchi at Tibor de Nagy,"Arts, March 1974
- Schwartz, Barbara. "Ray Ciarrocchi at Tibor de Nagy," ArtNews, April 1972
- Mellow, James R. "Ray Ciarrocchi," New York Times, March 1, 1972
- Scofield, Gerald . "Ray Ciarrocchi at Tibor de Nagy," Pictures On Exhibit May–June 1972
- Mikotajuk, Andrea. "Ray Ciarrocchi at Tibor de Nagy," Arts, Summer 1971
- Gruen, John. "Ray Ciarrocchi," New York, June 7, 1971
