= Battle of Basra =

Battle of Basra may refer to:

- Battle of the Camel (656), conflict over succession to the caliphate.
- Capture of Basra, Zutts capture Basra from the Abbasid Caliphate.
- Battle of Basra (871), Zanj capture of Basra
- Siege of Basra (1775–1776), Zand capture of Basra.
- Battle of Basra (1914), British capture Basra from the Ottoman Empire in Mesopotamian campaign.
- Basra offensive (1982), major land battle following expulsion of Iraq from Iran.
- Siege of Basra (1987), Iranian siege of Basra.
- Battle of Basra (1991), battle between Iraqi forces and Shi’ite militants allied with Iraqi army defectors in the 1991 uprisings in Iraq.
- Battle of Basra (2003), the first major conflict in the 2003 invasion of Iraq; mostly fought by British troops.
- Battle of Basra (2007), insurgent siege of UK army bases in Basra.
- Battle of Basra (2008), an offensive launched against Shi'ite militias during the Iraq War.

== See also ==
- Battle of Bosra
