= Ciarrocchi =

Ciarrocchi is an Italian surname. Notable people with the surname include:

- Alessandro Ciarrocchi (born 1988), Swiss footballer
- Pat Ciarrocchi (born 1952), American television journalist
- Ray Ciarrocchi, American painter
