= Jonah Winter =

American author

Jonah Winter (born August 19, 1962) is an American children’s book author, illustrator, musician and poet, best known for his nonfiction picture books about racial justice, baseball players, politicians, artists, and musicians.

== Early life and education ==
Winter was born August 19, 1962, in Fort Worth, Texas. He grew up in Dallas, Texas, the son of author-illustrator Jeanette Winter and visual artist Roger Winter. His first publication credit came at age seven with poems published in an adult literary magazine. He went on to study poetry at Oberlin College.

== Career ==
After supporting himself as a flower deliverer, a llama ranch hand, and a children’s book editor during his 20s, Winter launched his children’s book career in 1991 with a book conceived and illustrated by Jeanette Winter, entitled Diego (Alfred A. Knopf), for which he wrote the text. He went on to write more than 40 children’s books, including two that he also illustrated, Fair Ball: 14 Great Stars from Baseball’s Negro Leagues (Scholastic, 1999), and Beisbol! Latino Baseball Pioneers and Legends (Lee and Low, 2001). As a poet, he has published two full-length volumes for adults, Maine (Slope Editions, 1999) and Amnesia (Oberlin College Press, 2004), and two chapbooks, The Continuing Misadventures of Andrew, the Headless Talking Bear (Octopus Books, 2006) and Book Reports (Octopus Books, 2007).

During the early 1990s, Winter was a member of the indie rock band, Ed’s Redeeming Qualities, in which he sang and played clarinet, accordion, mandolin, guitar and tin whistle, as featured on two albums, Big Grapefruit Cleanup Job and At the Fish and Game Club. The band was featured in a romantic comedy film from 1996 called Ed’s Next Move.

In recent years, Winter has criticized censorship of children’s books, in essays published in The New York Times, The Wall Street Journal and The Dallas Morning News, and in a C-SPAN interview.

== Awards and honors ==
Three of Winter’s books have won the New York Times Best Illustrated Award: Diego (1991), illustrated by Jeanette Winter; Here Comes the Garbage Barge (2010), illustrated by Red Nose Studio; and Ruth Bader Ginsburg: The Case of RBG vs. Inequality (2017), illustrated by Stacy Innerst. In 2008, his book Barack was a New York Times Best-Seller. His 2013 book, You Never Heard of Willie Mays?!, was a New York Times Editors Choice. His 2016 book, My Name Is James Madison Hemings, was a New York Times Notable Children’s Book.

Other accolades include a Jane Addams Children’s Book Award Honor for his 2015 book, Lillian’s Right to Vote, which was also a Kirkus Prize finalist that year. In 2019, Winter’s book, The Sad Little Fact, was a Time Magazine Best Children’s Book of the year, and his book, Thurgood, was a Washington Post Best Children’s Book. In 2024, Winter was honored with a Horace Mann Upstanders Award for his book, Banned Book.

== Selected works ==
- Diego, illustrated by Jeanette Winter, Alfred A. Knopf (1991)
- Frida, illustrated by Ana Juan, Scholastic (2002)
- Roberto Clemente: Pride of the Pittsburgh Pirates, illustrated by Raul Colon, Simon & Schuster (2005)
- The 39 Apartments of Ludwig Van Beethoven, illustrated by Barry Blitt, Random House (2006)
- Dizzy, illustrated by Sean Qualls, Scholastic (2006)
- Steel Town, illustrated by Terry Widener, Simon & Schuster (2008)
- Barack, illustrated by A.G. Ford, HarperCollins (2008)
- Gertrude Is Gertrude Is Gertrude Is Gertrude, illustrated by Calef Brown, Simon & Schuster (2009)
- You Never Heard of Sandy Koufax?!, illustrated by Andre Carrilho, Random House (2009)
- Peaceful Heroes, illustrated by Sean Addy, Scholastic (2009)
- Sonia Sotomayor: A Judge Grows in the Bronx, illustrated by Edel Rodriguez, Simon & Schuster (2009)
- Here Comes the Garbage Barge!, illustrated by Red Nose Studio, Random House (2010)
- Jazz Age Josephine, illustrated by Marjorie Priceman, Simon & Schuster (2012)
- Just Behave, Pablo Picasso!, illustrated by Kevin Hawkes, Scholastic (2012)
- You Never Heard of Willie Mays?!, illustrated by Terry Widener, Random House (2013)
- The Founding Fathers!, illustrated by Barry Blitt, Simon & Schuster (2015)
- How Jelly Roll Morton Invented Jazz, illustrated by Keith Mallet, Macmillan (2015)
- Lillian’s Right to Vote, illustrated by Shane Evans, Random House (2015)
- My Name Is James Madison Hemings, illustrated by Terry Widener, Random House (2016)
- The Secret Project, illustrated by Jeanette Winter, Simon & Schuster (2017)
- Ruth Bader Ginsburg: The Case of RBG vs. Inequality, illustrated by Stacy Innerst, Abrams (2017)
- Elvis Is King!, illustrated by Red Nose Studio, Random House (2019)
- The Sad Little Fact, illustrated by Pete Oswald, Random House (2019)
- Thurgood, illustrated by Bryan Collier, Random House (2019)
- Mother Jones and Her Army of Mill Children, illustrated by Nancy Carpenter, Random House (2019)
- Oil, illustrated by Jeanette Winter, Simon & Schuster (2020)
- Welcome to Bobville!, illustrated by Bob Staake, Random House (2020)
- The Little Owl and the Big Tree, illustrated by Jeanette Winter, Simon & Schuster (2021)
- Banned Book, illustrated by Gary Kelley, Creative Editions (2023)
- The Snow Man, illustrated by Jeanette Winter, Simon & Schuster (2023)
- Bird Rehearsal, illustrated by Stacy Innerst, Abrams (2024)
- It Happened in Salem, illustrated by Brad Holland, Creative Editions (2024)
