= Victoria Gitman =

Argentine-American painter

- Born: Victoria Gitman; 1972 (age 53–54); Buenos Aires, Argentina
- Education: Florida International University
- Known for: Painting

Victoria Gitman is a mid-career Argentine painter currently living in Hallandale Beach, Florida. Her work, though highly figurative, has been linked to minimalist abstract traditions of the 1960s. Working on a small scale, Gitman has worked in several series, always focusing on themes of femininity, beauty, the tradition of craftsmanship, and the history of art, dating back to the fifteenth century. Her subjects have included quotations of portraits by well known artists, self-portraits, jewelry, purses, and, most recently, luxurious swaths of colored fur.

== Biography ==
Gitman was born in Buenos Aires, Argentina. She relocated to Miami as a teenager in 1987, where she attended Florida International University, completing her Bachelor of Fine Arts in painting and Bachelor of Arts in humanities in 1996. She was also a fellow at the Yale Summer School of Art. In 2001, Gitman moved to Hallandale Beach, Florida, where she now lives and works. Her paintings and drawings have been exhibited globally in New York, Los Angeles, Tokyo, and Miami.

== Artistic Style ==
Although her work is precisely representational, Gitman’s mature paintings engage the language of abstraction. Her reductive compositions emphasize the formal qualities of the work and evoke abstract painting traditions. In conceptual terms, her work is concerned with notions of femininity, beauty and desire through the lens of art history. In her labor-intensive paintings, Gitman unpacks the performance of femininity and explores humankind's relationship with craftsmanship, and all the gender politics that come with it.

=== Self representations ===
While still a student at Florida International University in the late 1990s, Gitman began a series of "self representations" based on canonical paintings from art history. She quoted Edgar Degas, Jacques-Louis David, John Singer Sargent, Bronzino, John William Waterhouse, Georges de La Tour, Caravaggio, Domenico Ghirlandaio and Johannes Vermeer. However, in place of the existing women, she would paint herself, often changing the gaze to lock eyes with the viewer directly. In doing so, she blurred the boundaries between subject (model) and object (painter), original and imitation, the historical male perspective and the contemporary female one.

=== The Beauties ===
In the early 2000s, Gitman turned away from self portraiture but kept her focus on portraiture of female subjects from western art history. In a series titled "The Beauties," she depicted postcards of female portraits from the fifteenth through the nineteenth centuries. These portraits were diminutive in scale, always the size of a 6 x 4 inch postcard. The way Gitman precisely copied every detail of these portraits gives her work a fetishistic touch, as if she is elevating the objecthood of the original image. Thus, her work falls in line with the tradition of trompe l'oeil painting. Here, too, we see a tension between the old and new; being both gracefully old and yet abruptly new. The series later included several groups of minute drawings in graphite on mylar that reproduce works by artists such as Ingres, Titian and Bronzino. From 2008-2009 she also created a group of oil paintings on panel that reproduce portrait drawings by Ingres, re-creating his graphite lines in oil paint.

=== On display ===
Concurrently with "The Beauties," Gitman decided to further concentrate her focus on the jewelry the women in these portraits were wearing. She would isolate a necklace, or perhaps a brooch, against a plain background. This time, however, her source was not fifteenth century portraiture, but rather thrift shop and antique store finds. Here, explicitly, the compositions were strikingly minimal and repetitive: just a necklace set atop a solid background, forming a simple circular outline. This simplicity is reminiscent of the purity of the abstract modernism trend of the 1960s.

Gitman would go on to expand her cast of subjects. By the mid 2000s, she introduced a series of beaded purses, and later expanded her reach to include fur purses as well. Though it may seem that she shifted away from her art historical beginnings, in fact, the roots stayed the same. At thrift stores, she'd select vintage purses whose geometric patterns reminded her of the works od modernist abstract artists. The resulting paintings “converge with various early and mid-20th century painterly traditions: evoking modernist compositional tendencies, the artist aligns her imagery with the picture plane and extends it nearly edge-to-edge within the pictorial field, which has the effect of collapsing recessional space. Gitman buttresses these subtle formal dialogues with modernist abstraction by inserting veiled references to the work of canonical artists such as Kazimir Malevich, Mark Rothko, and Ad Reinhardt.”

In recent years, Gitman has turned from beaded purses exclusively to fur purses, narrowing in even closer so that the object itself is obscured and the subject is simply colored fur – not a purse. Here, too, there is a fetishistic element as viewers are seduced to approach the diminutive canvases; they expect a tactile experience to result, though that proves impossible. Gitman explains in the catalogue for her 2015 solo show Victoria Gitman: Desiring Eye at Pérez Art Museum Miami, “Perhaps the most challenging transition was from the beaded purses to the fur: the beaded surfaces have structure, solidity, definition—they’re an aggregate of discrete units—whereas fur is supple, amorphous, lush.”

== Exhibitions ==
=== Solo exhibitions ===
1997

- Praxis International Art, Mexico City, September 11–October 10

1998

- Cultural Resource Center, Miami, September 8–October 14

1999

- The Fine Arts Gallery at Broward Community College, Florida, January 4–January 30

2000

- Elite Fine Art, Miami, September 1–September 29

2002

- Fischbach Gallery, New York, September 17–October 12

2004

- Daniel Weinberg Gallery, Los Angeles, March 20–April 17
- Fischbach Gallery, New York, January 8–February 7

2005–2006

- On Display, Bass Museum of Art, Miami Beach, July 12, 2005 – January 22, 2006

2006

- David Nolan Gallery, New York, September 9–October 14
- Daniel Weinberg Gallery, Los Angeles, October 21–November 25

2007

- Megumi Ogita Gallery, Tokyo, October 9–October 27

2008

- Looking Closely, Las Vegas Art Museum, February 2–April 27

2009

- Daniel Weinberg Gallery, Los Angeles, September 12–October 24

2010

- The Cartin Collection @ Ars Libri, Boston, January–March 1

2011–2012

- David Nolan Gallery, New York, December 10–January 21

2014

- 8/Art Gallery/Tomio Koyama, Tokyo, March 19–April 14

2015

- Victoria Gitman, Garth Greenan Gallery, New York, January 8–February 14
- Victoria Gitman: Desiring Eye, Pérez Art Museum Miami, February 26–May 31

2018

- Victoria Gitman: Taktisch, Garth Greenan Gallery, New York, January 11–February 17

=== Group exhibitions ===
1996

- Three Artists, Praxis International Art, Mexico City, November 7–December 31

1998

- Hortt 40, Museum of Art, Fort Lauderdale

1999

- New Files, Museum of Art, Fort Lauderdale, June 10–September 19
- ReVision, Bruce Gallery, Edinboro University of Pennsylvania, Edinboro, November 3–December 22

2003

- Art a Century Apart: 1903 and 2003, Mississippi Museum of Art, Jackson, March 22–May 4
- Light As Air, Fischbach Gallery, New York, July 7–August 22

2000

- Florida Painting: Spectrum of Expression, Museum of Art, Tallahassee, March 31–May 24
- Figurings, Ritter Art Gallery, Florida Atlantic University, Boca Raton, September 16–November 18
- Figurative Vignettes, The Art Center, Saint Petersburg, Florida, March 12–June 30
- Reinventing Tradition, Armory Art Center, West Palm Beach, April 7–May 6

2002–2003

- Amigos, The World Arts Building, Miami, December 2002–January 2003

2004

- Transitory Patterns, National Museum of Women in the Arts, Washington D.C., October 15–December 19

2005

- On Paper, Daniel Weinberg Gallery, Los Angeles, February 26–April 16
- Transitory Patterns, Museum of Art, Fort Lauderdale, March 11–June 19; DeLand Museum of Art, Florida, September 23–November 20

2006

- Block Party, Daniel Weinberg Gallery, Los Angeles, July 15–August 26
- Transitory Patterns, Brogan Museum of Art, Tallahassee, February 18–April 14; University of West Florida Art Gallery, Pensacola, January 13–February 3

2006–2007

- TRANSactions, Museum of Contemporary Art San Diego, September 17, 2006 – May 13, 2007

2007

- Block Party II, Daniel Weinberg Gallery, Los Angeles, June 30–August 25
- TRANSactions, Memorial Art Gallery, University of Rochester, New York, October 6–December 30

2008

- TRANSactions, High Museum of Art, Atlanta, February 9–May 4; Weatherspoon Art Museum, University of North Carolina, June 22–September 21

2008–2009

- On Paper, David Nolan Gallery, New York, June 26–August 1
- Another Damned Drawing Show, Daniel Weinberg Gallery, Los Angeles, December 6, 2008 – January 31, 2009

2009–2010

- Drawing Itself, Brattleboro Museum, Vermont, November 22, 2009 – February 21, 2010

2010

- Wall-to-Wall, Daniel Weinberg Gallery, Los Angeles, June 5–August 14
- Recent Acquisitions from the Latin American Art Collection, Museum of Art, Fort Lauderdale, May 8–December 5

2010–2011

- Old to New, Frost Art Museum, Florida International University, Miami, October 13, 2010 – September 18, 2011

2011

- The New Verisimilitude, Francois Ghebaly Gallery, Los Angeles, July 16–August 20

2012

- South Florida Cultural Consortium Fellowship Exhibition, Art and Culture Center of Hollywood, September 10–October 16

2013–2014

- Daniel Weinberg Gallery 40th Anniversary Exhibition, Ambach and Rice, Los Angeles, November 23–January 11

2015–2016

- Global Positioning Systems, Perez Art Museum Miami, July 2015–June 2016.
- Tomio Koyama Gallery: Works from the Collection, 8/Art Gallery/Tomio Koyama, Tokyo, December 16, 2015 – January 11, 2016.

2017

- Really? Curated by Beth Rudin DeWoody, Wilding Cran Gallery, Los Angeles, November 5–December 23

== Collections ==
- Columbus Museum of Art, Ohio
- Herbert H. Johnson Art Museum, Cornell University, Ithaca, NY
- Museum of Modern Art, New York
- Whitney Museum of American Art, New York
- Detroit Institute of Arts
- Los Angeles County Museum of Art
- Museum of Contemporary Art San Diego
- Frost Art Museum, Florida International University, Miami
- The Museum of Art, Fort Lauderdale
- Untitled, 2020. Pérez Art Museum Miami
