= Lou Brooks =

American cartoonist and writer (1944–2021)

- Born: 5 September 1944; Abington, Pennsylvania, United States
- Died: 21 November 2021 (aged 77)
- Years active: Illustrator, cartoonist, author

Lou Brooks (September 5, 1944 – November 21, 2021) was a self-taught American illustrator, cartoonist, and author. He is best known for his precise bold line work and graphic reinterpretation of mid-twentieth century comics, magazines, advertising, and other popular culture from the period.

== History and influences ==
Brooks was born in Abington, Pennsylvania. Until the age of nine, he lived with his parents and grandparents in Warminster, Pennsylvania. His grandfather, an immigrant brick layer from Piacenza, Italy, built the house by hand. By this time, Brooks's father had returned from World War II, and, in order to raise his family, had abandoned his pursuit of having a career as a comic strip artist. Brooks found himself immersed in his father's art supplies and discarded sketch books of unfinished comic strips, and easily took to drawing cartoons at an early age.

In 1954, he and his family moved to Levittown, Pennsylvania, and a life of postwar conformity in a community of over 17,000 assembly-line homes on 22 square miles. It was the largest suburban planned community in the United States. Living there greatly affected what was to become Brooks's lifelong aversion to sameness. Nevertheless, the suburban baby boomer popular culture of the 1950s, which included comic books, cars, rock and roll music, and television, influenced Brooks's sensibilities to a large extent.

His career in art began in 1965 as a production artist in the advertising art department of a Philadelphia newspaper, which he credits as giving him a thorough well-rounded knowledge of the graphic arts. He and his wife, Clare Vanacore, relocated to New York City in 1977, and lived there until 1994. They later resided in Northern California.

== Illustration art ==
Beginning in the 1970s, Brooks's art has appeared in just about every major national publication, including fourteen commissions for Time and Newsweek covers, as well as six for the German news publication Der Spiegel. Other publications in which his illustrations have appeared include The New Yorker, The Atlantic, The New York Times, The Washington Post, The LA Times, The Wall Street Journal, Rolling Stone, Fortune, Money Magazine, Vanity Fair, Sports Illustrated, Wired, and Reader's Digest, to name a few.

In 1985, Parker Brothers commissioned Brooks to redesign the Monopoly game logo and illustrate an updated version of the character Mr. Monopoly (formerly known as Rich Uncle Pennybags). He was also commissioned at the time to develop and illustrate the game's special "50th Anniversary Commemorative Edition" embossed tin box packaging. The art was also carried over onto the more traditional cardboard game box which was revised especially for the Anniversary. His Monopoly design and logo is still familiar to anyone who has played the game.

Major advertising clients include: Coca-Cola, Pizza Hut, Budweiser, Dr. Pepper, CBS, NBC, Milton Bradley, Nikon, Sony, IBM, TWA, Clairol, Verizon, AT&T, and Exxon. His art has been animated for television by MTV, Nickelodeon, and HBO.

In 1984, he was jury chairman of The New Illustration Show at the Society of Illustrators in New York City. In 1988, he was jury chairman of the Humor '88 Show at the Society. He has served on juries for various art competitions for Atlanta Art Directors Club, Society of Publication Designers, Creative Club of Boston, and Columbus Society of Communication Arts, among others. He's been a featured speaker at various organizations and Universities. Starting in 1983, he was a guest lecturer for several years at American Illustration Weekend, New York City.

Brooks has been credited as a pioneer of infusing high-profile illustration assignments with the sensibility of low brow comic book iconography. Bob Staake, in his book The Complete Book of Humorous Art, wrote: "In many ways, Brooks's impact is similar to the effect that Andy Warhol had on the world of art. If Warhol said it was okay to call soup cans art, Brooks said it was okay to call old comic book imagery humorous illustration."

== Comic art ==
Beginning in 1977 alongside such comic artists as Art Spiegelman and Harvey Kurtzman, Brooks was a charter contributor to Playboy Magazine's monthly color feature Playboy Funnies with his comic strips "Teasers" and "Sweet Dreams," among others. His various top-of-the-page Funnies logo panels that exclusively opened the feature each month ran continuously for over a decade. Several of his comics as well as a Funnies logo are included in the 2004 anthology, Playboy: 50 Years: The Cartoons, edited by Hugh Hefner.

From 1976 to 1979, his comic strip "Banana Bob, Boy Inventor of Harding High" was featured monthly in each issue of Bananas Magazine. He was also a regularly featured illustrator and occasional writer for the magazine. Bananas was edited at the time by the now-legendary horror author R. L. Stine.

== Special projects ==
In 1980, Brooks was a founding member, performer and songwriter with the all-cartoonist comedy band, Ben Day & the Zipatones. Other band members included Bill Plympton, Mark Alan Stamaty, Elwood Smith, and Skip Johnston, art director of National Lampoon. The band headlined at the 1981 Artists and Models Ball at Irving Plaza, New York City, to an audience of 1,500 artists for the benefit of the Graphic Artists Guild. Brooks also produced the concert.

In 1982, he appeared as the voice of Mr. Hands in Mr. Bill in Space, a book and record furthering the adventures of Mr. Bill, a character invented by Walter Williams for the television show Saturday Night Live.

In 1988, he and Robert Zemeckis served as the opening feature events for American Illustration Weekend at Fashion Institute of Technology, New York. Brooks performed on stage and presented his animated mixed-media mock biopic, A Guy Named Lou.

Since 2006, Brooks has been the founder and curator of The Museum of Forgotten Art Supplies, a virtual online visual collection of nearly 700 graphic arts tools and supplies that the computer has made obsolete or near obsolete.
