= Mark Alan Stamaty =

American cartoonist, born 1947

- Born: 1947 (age 78–79) Brooklyn, New York
- Areas: Cartoonist, Artist
- Notable works: Washingtoon; Alia's Mission: Saving the Books of Iraq
- Spouse: Lynn Holst

Mark Alan Stamaty (b. 1947, in Brooklyn, New York) is an American cartoonist and children's writer and illustrator. The author of the long-running weekly political comic strip Washington, Stamaty has also published several books, including collections of his strips and graphic novels for children.

== Education ==
His father, Stanley Stamaty (1916–1979), was a professional gag cartoonist, and his mother, Clara Gee Stamaty (1919–2022), was a commercial illustrator and fine artist. Stanley and Clara both attended the Art Academy of Cincinnati.

Mark Alan Stamaty graduated in 1969 with a degree in art from the Cooper Union in New York.

== Cartooning ==
During the 1970s, 1980s, and 1990s, Stamaty's work appeared regularly in the Village Voice. His first regular comic strip was MacDoodle Street, which ran in the Voice from 1978 to 1979. Centered on the misadventures of aspiring poet Malcolm Frazzle and a large cast of Greenwich Village eccentrics, the strip combined absurdist humor, dense visual detail, and serialized storytelling in a satirical portrait of New York City life. The entire run of the strip was collected in 2019 by The New York Review of Books.

In 1980–1981, Stamaty performed with the all-cartoonist comedy band Ben Day & the Zipatones. Other band members included founder Lou Brooks, Bill Plympton, Elwood Smith, and Skip Johnston, art director of National Lampoon. The band headlined at the 1981 Artists and Models Ball at Irving Plaza, New York City, to an audience of 1,500 artists for the benefit of the Graphic Artists Guild.

Stamaty created the long-running political satire comic strip Washingtoon in 1981, originally for The Washington Post. The strip centered on fictional Congressman Bob Forehead and other recurring figures in Washington, D.C. In the strip, Stamaty lampooned politicians, lobbyists, journalists, and the institutions of American government. Ultimately, Washingtoon was syndicated to "more than 40 newspapers, including The Boston Globe, the Pittsburgh Post-Gazette, and the Austin-American Statesman." Washingtoon inspired a short-lived (12-episode) Showtime Network television series in 1985. The strip ran until the mid-1990s; it was briefly revived in 2012 by Stamaty in The New Republic to focus on the 2012 presidential election between Barack Obama and Mitt Romney.

Stamaty was the op-ed cartoonist for Time magazine in 1994-1996.

In 1996–1997, his online strip Doodlennium ran in Slate magazine, a publication for which Stamaty also provided spot illustrations.

Stamaty' first graphic novel for children was Too Many Time Machines (1999). He followed it with Alia's Mission: Saving the Books of Iraq (2004), about Alia Muhammad Baker, the chief librarian of the Al Basra Central Library in Iraq, who saved an estimated 30,000 books from destruction during the Iraq War.

Stamaty produced a monthly comic strip in the New York Times Book Review called Boox in 2001–2004 that made fun of publishing trends.

He was commissioned to provide an illustration for the interior of retailer Sonos's new store in New York City's SoHo district, which opened in July 2016.

In 2018, Stamaty drew the cover for Delancey St. Station, the debut album by NYC rock band Pinc Louds.

== Children's books work ==
Stamaty's work in the children's book field include Yellow Yellow (1971, with author Frank Asch, reissued in 2019 by Drawn & Quarterly); Minnie Maloney & Macaroni (1976); and the cult classic Who Needs Donuts?, originally published in 1973 and reprinted by Random House in 2003.

== Legacy and influence ==
In 2012, cartoonist Jeffrey Brown told USA Today about how Stamaty's Small in the Saddle had influenced his own career and about subsequently meeting the author.

== Awards and honors ==
Stamaty's honors include two Gold Medals and a Silver Medal from the Society of Illustrators, a Page One Award from the Newspaper Guild of New York, the Premio Satira Politica Forte dei Marmi (Museum of Satire and Caricature in Forte dei Marmi, Italy, 2005), and the Augustus Saint-Gaudens Award for Career Achievement in Art (Cooper Union Alumni Association, 2007).

== Bibliography ==
=== Children's books ===
- (with writer Frank Asch) Yellow Yellow (McGraw-Hill, 1971); re-issued by Drawn & Quarterly in 2019
- Who Needs Donuts? (The Dial Press, 1973); re-issued by Random House in 2003 and Drawn & Quarterly in 2026
- Small in the Saddle (Windmill Books, 1975) ISBN 978-0525615255
- Minnie Maloney & Macaroni (The Dial Press, 1976) ISBN 978-0803755895
- Where's My Hippopotamus? (The Dial Press, 1977)

=== Comics, graphic novels, and collections ===
- Washingtoon (Congdon & Weed, 1983) ISBN 978-0312929251
- More Washingtoons (Prentice Hall, 1986) ISBN 978-0136011545
- Too Many Time Machines (Viking Books for Young Readers, 1999) ISBN 978-0670884773
- Alia's Mission: Saving the Books of Iraq (Knopf, 2004)
- Shake, Rattle, and Turn That Noise Down: How Elvis Shook Up Music, Me, and Mom (Knopf, 2010) ISBN 978-0-375-84685-4
- MacDoodle Street (The New York Review of Books, 2019)
