= Anne Arnold =

American sculptor (1925–2014)

- Born: May 2, 1925; Melrose, Massachusetts, U.S.
- Died: June 20, 2014 (aged 89); New York City, U.S.
- Education: Art Students League; University of New Hampshire, Ohio State University
- Occupation: Sculptor
- Known for: Whimsical sculptures of animals and people
- Spouse: Ernest Briggs

Anne Arnold (May 2, 1925 – June 20, 2014) was an American sculptor best known for her whimsical life-size and sometimes larger than life-size sculptures of animals and people rendered in wood, ceramic, or softer materials such as canvas and Dynel, and resins.

== Early life and family ==
Arnold was born on May 2, 1925, in Melrose, Massachusetts, where she was raised. Her father was Edmund Arnold, a civil engineer, and her mother was Fanny (née Doty) Arnold. She had two brothers, and together they grew up spending their summers on the coast of Massachusetts in Humarock. She is a direct descendant of Benedict Arnold, and can trace her ancestry back to the Mayflower. Anne married the abstract painter Ernest Briggs in 1960. Arnold and Briggs bought a house and barn in Montville, Maine, in 1961, at the foot of Hogback Mountain. Briggs died in 1984. Anne's long-time companion was the photographer Robert Brooks.

In 1946, Arnold received her BA from the University of New Hampshire, and in 1947 an MA from Ohio State University. She studied art from 1949 until 1953 at the Art Students League in New York.

== Artistic career ==
Anne Arnold began creating sculptures of dogs, people and other domestic creatures in the 1950s. In 1960 she held her first one-person exhibition at New York's Tanager Gallery. From 1964 until 1988 Arnold showed her work at the Fischbach Gallery in New York. The Paul Creative Arts Center of the University of New Hampshire exhibited a full retrospective of her work in 1983.

During the 1970s, Arnold created life-size, and bigger than life-size sculptures. She made them by wrapping canvas around wooden armatures.

After Arnold's husband Ernie Briggs' death in 1984 she worked mostly with watercolor and pencil on sketches made outdoors in Maine.

In 2006, the Alexandre Gallery in New York began to represent Arnold's work. In 2012 and in 2014 the Alexandre Gallery held one-person shows of her work.

Arnold served on the Board of Governors of the Skowhegan School of Painting and Sculpture from 1981 until 2010. She was also an associate of the National Academy of Design in New York.

After receiving her MA degree from Ohio State University in 1947, Arnold taught drawing, painting, and art history for two years at Geneseo College in New York. Beginning in 1971, and for the following 20 years, Arnold taught sculpture at Brooklyn College. She also taught at Columbia University and the University of Pennsylvania.

Arnold died on June 20, 2014, of natural causes, in her New York City studio, at the age of 89.

== Collections ==
Ann Arnold's work can be found in several public collections such as:

- Albright Knox Art Gallery, Buffalo, NY
- Chrysler Museum of Art, Norfolk, VA
- Kalamazoo Institute of Arts, Kalamazoo, MI
- Metropolitan Museum of Art, New York City, NY.
