= Jeanette Winter =

American author and illustrator (1939–2025)

- Born: Jeanette Margot Ragner; October 6, 1939; Chicago, Illinois, U.S.
- Died: November 7, 2025 (aged 86); New York City, U.S.
- Occupations: Author and illustrator
- Spouse: Roger Winter (1960–2025)
- Children: Jonah Winter; Max Winter

Jeanette Winter (née Ragner; October 6, 1939 – November 7, 2025) was an American author and illustrator. She is best known for her children's books, many of which are about women in history, including activists, athletes and artists.

== Early life ==
Winter was born October 6, 1939, in Chicago, the only child of Swedish immigrants. She was raised in Chicago and formed interests in visual arts from an early age.

In 1960, she married artist Roger Winter, and they moved to New York City where Jeanette worked in the New York Public Library's main branch on Fifth Avenue. They later moved to Texas, where they had two sons, and she became a self-taught illustrator.

== Career ==
Jeanette Winter is known for her "simple, clean style" of painted illustration, which uses flat planes of color and uncluttered compositions and has drawn comparisons to the folk art tradition. Winter has had a prolific career, working on dozens of children's books including books about Venus and Serena Williams, Malala, Iqbal Masih, Greta Thunberg, Alia Muhammad Baker, and more. Her 2019 book Our House Is on Fire: Greta Thunberg’s Call to Save the Planet has been translated into twenty-one languages. In addition to writing and illustrating her own books, Winter has also illustrated several books written by her son Jonah Winter.

== Personal life and death ==
Winter's children are Jonah, a children's book author and poet, and Max, a poet and film critic.

Winter worked and lived in New York City. She died there on November 7, 2025, at the age of 86, from heart and kidney failure.

== Awards and honors ==
Winter's 1991 book Diego (authored by her son Jonah Winter) won the New York Times Best Illustrated Children's Book Award. Her 2006 book Mama won the Boston Globe–Horn Picture Book Honor. In 2010, her book Nasreen’s Secret School: A True Story from Afghanistan won the Jane Addams Children's Book Award in the Books for Younger Children category. Her book The World Is Not a Rectangle: A Portrait of Architect Zaha Hadid won the 2018 Orbis Pictus Honor.

== Selected works ==
=== As author and illustrator ===
- The Librarian of Basra: A True Story from Iraq (2005)
- Mama: A True Story, in Which a Baby Hippo Loses His Mama During a Tsunami, But Finds a New Home, and a New Mama (2006)
- Nasreen’s Secret School: A True Story from Afghanistan (2009)
- Biblioburro: A True Story from Colombia (2010)
- Malala, a Brave Girl from Pakistan / Iqbal, a Brave Boy from Pakistan (2014)
- Nanuk the Ice Bear (2016)
- The World Is Not a Rectangle: A Portrait of Architect Zaha Hadid (2017)
- Our House Is on Fire: Greta Thunberg’s Call to Save the Planet (2019)
- Sisters: Venus & Serena Williams (2019)
- Sister Corita's Words and Shapes (2021)

=== As illustrator ===
The following titles were written by Jeanette Winter's son, Jonah Winter.

- Diego (1991)
- The Secret Project (2017)
- Oil (2020)
- The Little Owl & the Big Tree: A Christmas Story (2021)
- The Snow Man (2023)
