= Roger Winter =

American artist (born 1934)

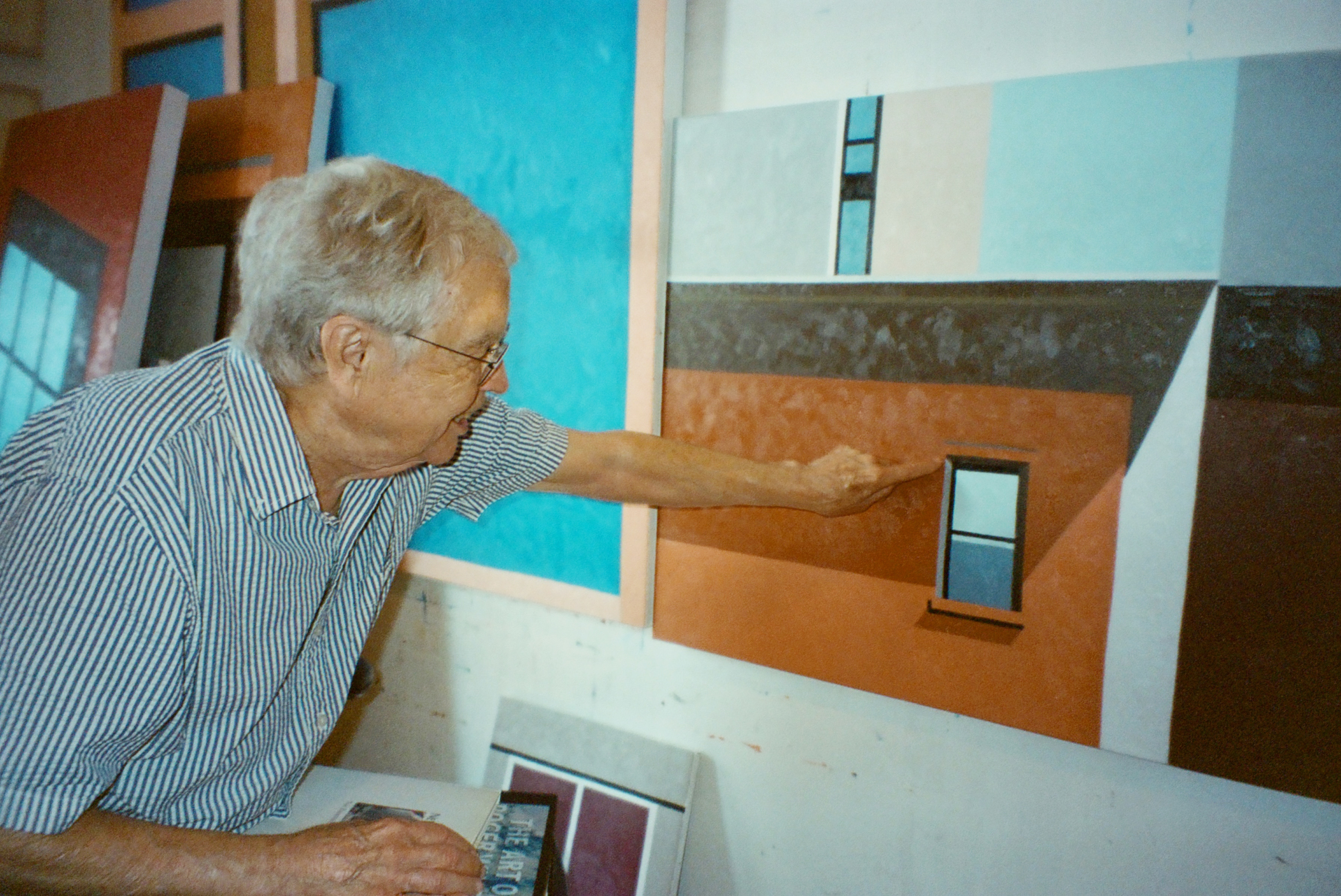
- Winter in his studio, 2024.
- Born: August 17, 1934 (age 91); Denison, Texas, U.S.
- Education: Brooklyn Museum Art School, University of Iowa, University of Texas at Austin
- Known for: Painting, drawing, collage, sculpture
- Movement: New Realism, Photorealism
- Spouse: Jeanette Ragner Winter (1960–2025)
- Children: Jonah Winter and Max Winter
- Website: http://www.rogerwinter.net

Roger Winter (born August 17, 1934) is an American contemporary artist and educator, best known for his landscape paintings of rural Texas and realist depictions of New York City.

== Early life and education ==
Winter was born August 17, 1934, in Denison, Texas, to itinerant farmers Gordon Fillmore Winter and Etta Mae Winter (née Kennemer), as the youngest of eight children.

In 1952, Winter left Denison to study art at the University of Texas in Austin. He was the first in his large original family to attend college. His professors at UT Austin included Constance Forsyth, Loren Mozley, Robert McDonald Graham, William Lester, and Everett Spruce.

After earning a Bachelor of Fine Arts and serving two years in the U.S. Army, he moved to Iowa City, Iowa to earn an MFA in painting from the University of Iowa. In 1960, he received a Max Beckmann Memorial Scholarship for study at the Brooklyn Museum School in New York.

== Career ==
Winter moved to Dallas, Texas in 1961, accepting a teaching position at Fort Worth Art Center. During this time, he also served as a studio assistant to Charles T. Williams, who introduced Winter to Jim Love, Roy Fridge, David McManaway, Hal Pauley, Bill Komodore, and Herb Rogalla. These artists all became known regionally, at the time, for their association with the Dallas Museum of Contemporary Art (DMCA), led by curator Douglas MacAgy, and for their involvement in the art scene surrounding Dallas' Oak Lawn neighborhood.

Between 1963 and 1989, Winter taught at Southern Methodist University's (SMU's) Meadows School of The Arts. Winter also taught painting and drawing for 10 years at the Dallas Museum of Fine Art.

From 1990 to 1996, Winter lived year-round in Frankfort, Maine, and soon became associated with the seasonal artistic community surrounding Penobscot Bay. In Maine, Winter was first introduced to the artist Alex Katz and the documentary filmmaker Frederick Wiseman through their mutual friend, the painter Neil Welliver. During this time, he also became acquainted with the painter Lois Dodd and the sculptor Anne Arnold. In 2018, Dodd and Winter staged a two-person exhibition at Kirk Hopper Fine Art, Dallas.

In 2012, Winter was the subject of a documentary, Roger Winter and the Line, directed by filmmaker Quin Mathews.

In 2013, Winter served as a consultant to President George W. Bush on the former president's painting practice. Bush has credited Winter for his decision to paint portraits of world leaders, twenty-four of which were later exhibited at the George W. Bush Presidential Center in Dallas.

Winter currently shows his work at Tara Downs Gallery in New York, New York.

== Work ==
As a painter, Winter has explored many approaches to balancing illusion and abstraction in his work. Winter's recent work shows the influence of his daily experience of architecture and ongoing construction in New York. His time spent in the minimal landscapes of New Mexico and Iceland has simplified his painted edges and divisions of canvas space. Winter's painterly brushwork and his belief in the importance of luminosity appear to be surviving elements from the past.

== Exhibitions ==
Winter’s work has been the subject of solo exhibitions at the following venues: Tara Downs, New York, US (2024); “Upper West Side Plus,” Kirk Hopper Fine Art, Dallas, US (2024); “Jazz Set,” Master Gallery, New York, US (2023); “Stories/Collages From Memory: Roger Winter,” Kirk Hopper Fine Art, Dallas, US (2020); and “Artist At Work,” Gerald Peters Gallery, Santa Fe, US (2019). The artist’s work has been presented in numerous group exhibitions including: “Albritton Collection of Texas Art,” Amarillo Museum of Art, Amarillo, US (2021); “Hip Squares,” The MADI Museum, Dallas, US (2020); Iceland From The Outside, MOMA Towers, New York, US (2020); “one plus one equals three,” Kirk Hopper Fine Art, Dallas, US (2019); “LOIS DODD/ROGER WINTER,” Kirk Hopper Fine Art, Dallas, US (2018); “The Neighborhood,” Master Gallery, New York, US (2016); “Monumental Works,” Kirk Hopper Fine Art, Dallas, US (2014); and “Under The Influence,” The Grace Museum,” Abilene, US (2012).

Between 1984 and 1998, Winter staged five solo exhibitions at the Fischbach Gallery in New York City, a gallery notable for its roster of artists, which also included Katz, Dodd, Arnold, Welliver, and Yvonne Jacquette.

== Public Collections ==
Winter's work has been acquired by a number of prominent public collections in the United States, including the National Arts Club, New York, NY; The Grace Museum, Abilene, TX; Tyler Museum of Art, Tyler, TX; Dallas Museum of Art, Dallas, TX; El Paso Museum of Art, El Paso, TX; Farnsworth Art Museum, Rockland, ME; Longview Museum of Fine Arts, Longview, TX; Meadows Museum, Dallas, TX; Fred Jones, Jr. Museum of Art, Norman, OK; Museum of Fine Arts, Houston, Houston, TX; McNay Art Museum, San Antonio, TX; and Portland Museum of Art, Portland, ME.

== Personal life ==
In 1960, Winter married children's book author and illustrator, Jeanette Ragner Winter. They were married until her death in 2025. They lived and maintained studios in New York City. They have two sons, Jonah and Max.

== Gallery ==
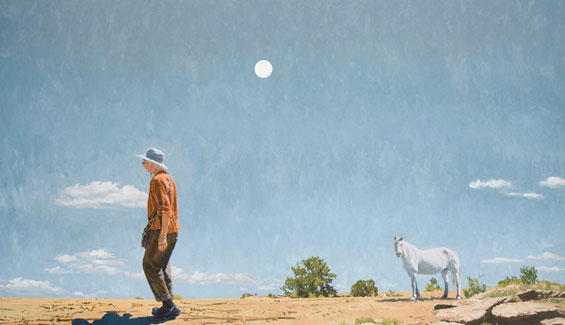
Roger Winter, The Long Walk, oil on linen, 42 x 72 in, 2010

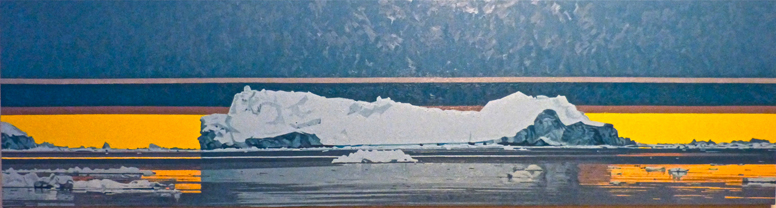
Roger Winter, Berit's Iceberg, oil on linen, 28 x 108 in, 2013

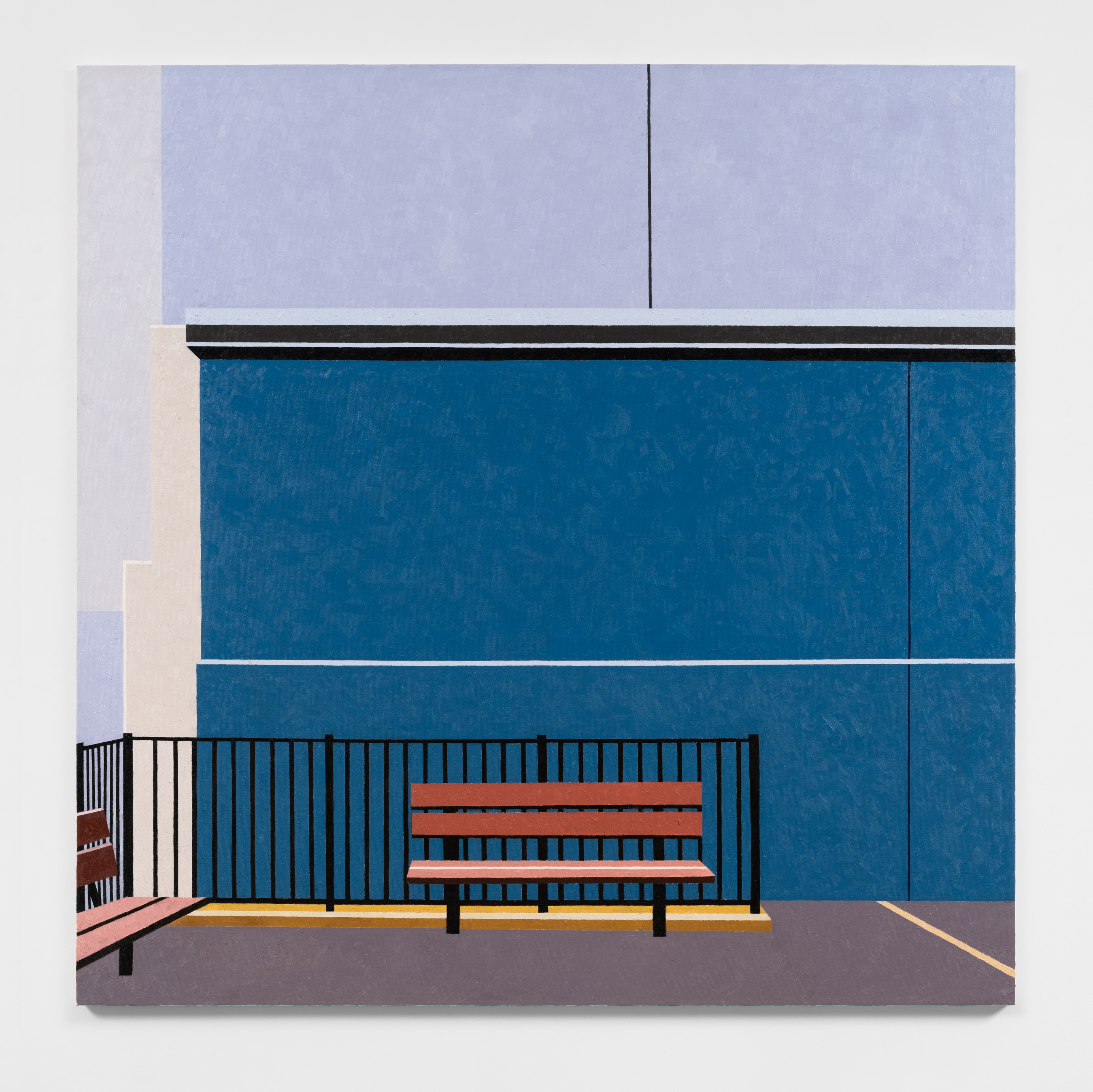
Roger Winter, P.S.93, oil on canvas, 72 x 72 in, 2018

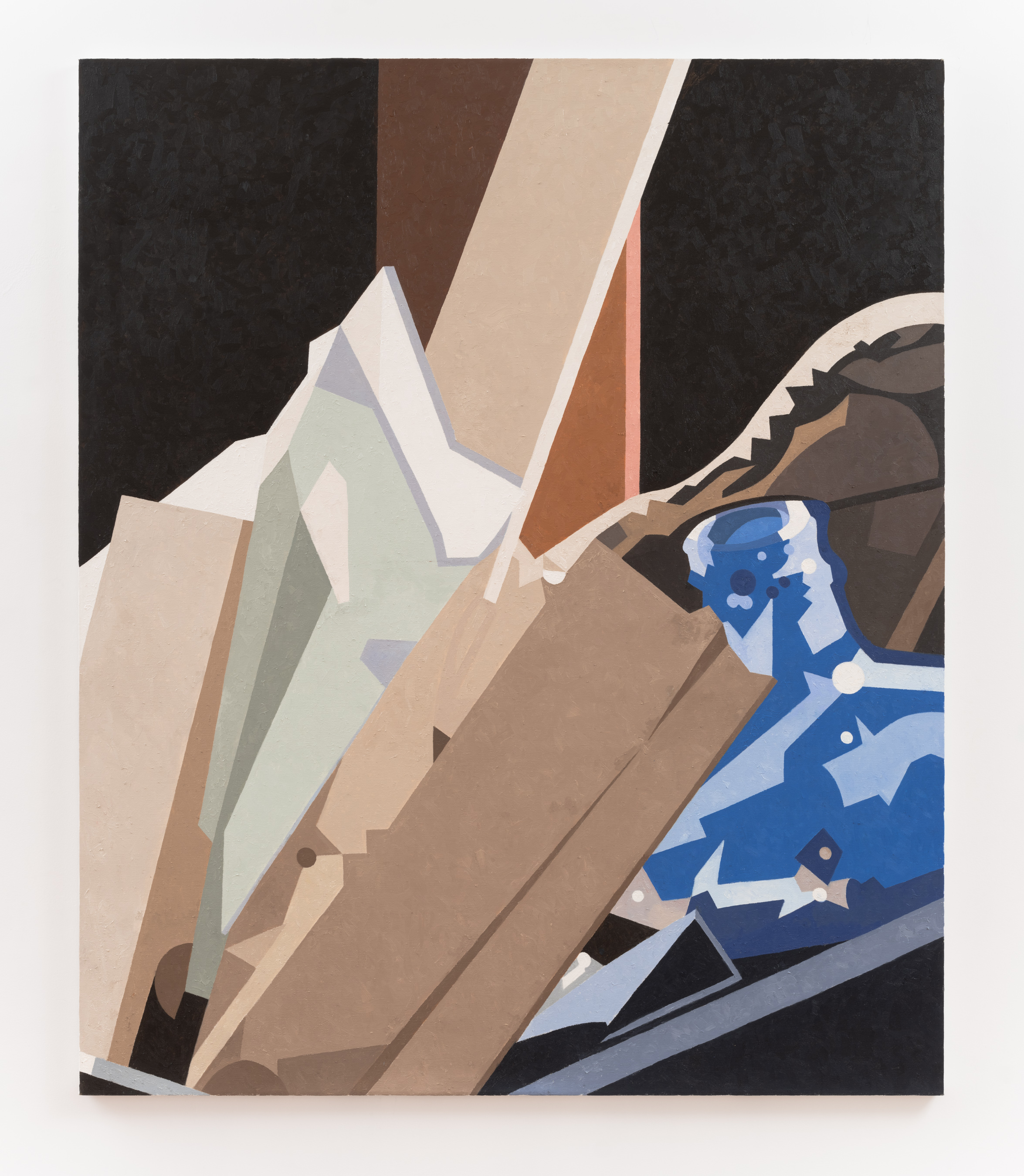
Roger Winter, Trash Heap, oil on linen, 72 x 60 in, 2019

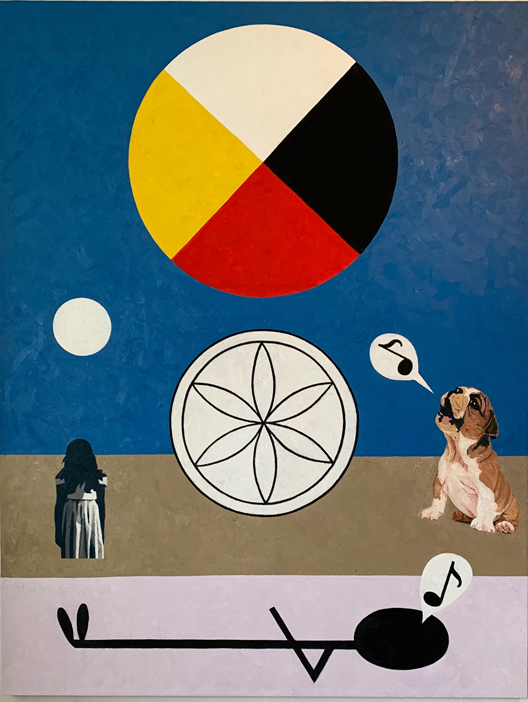
Roger Winter, Prescience, oil on linen, 60 x 48 in, 2020

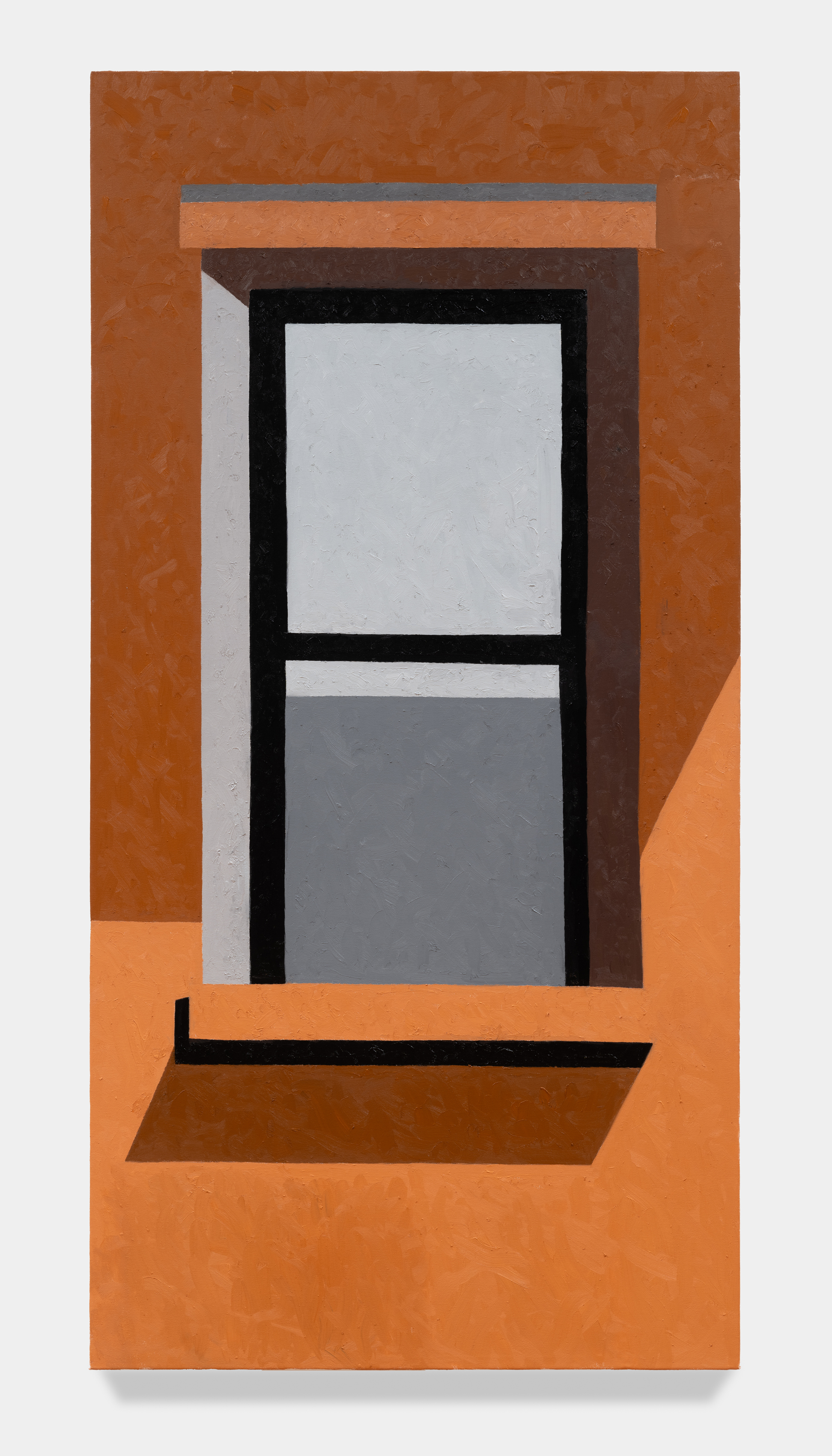
Roger Winter, Orange Wall & Window, oil on canvas, 60 x 30 in, 2024

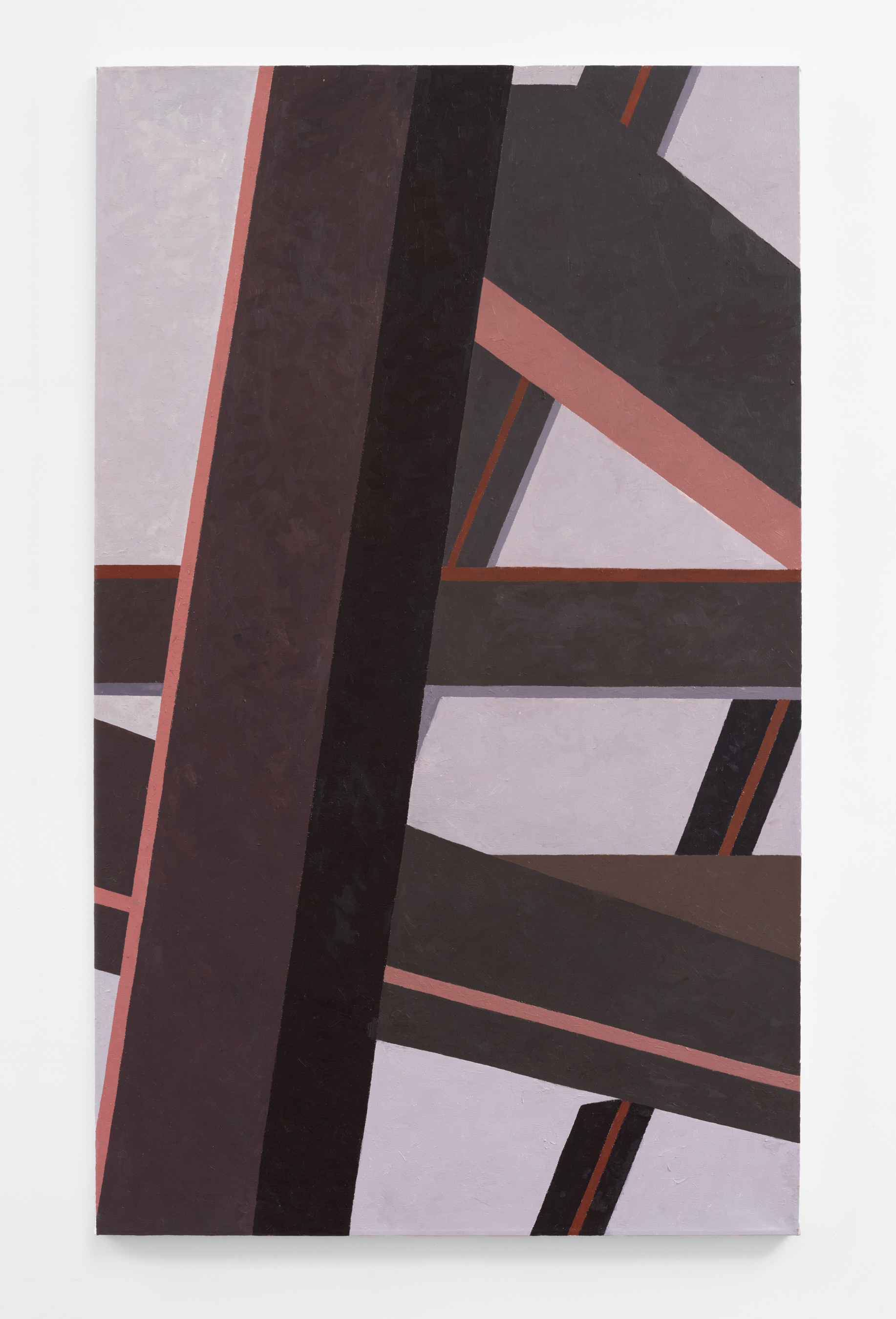
Roger Winter, Beams, oil on linen, 60 x 36 in, 2024

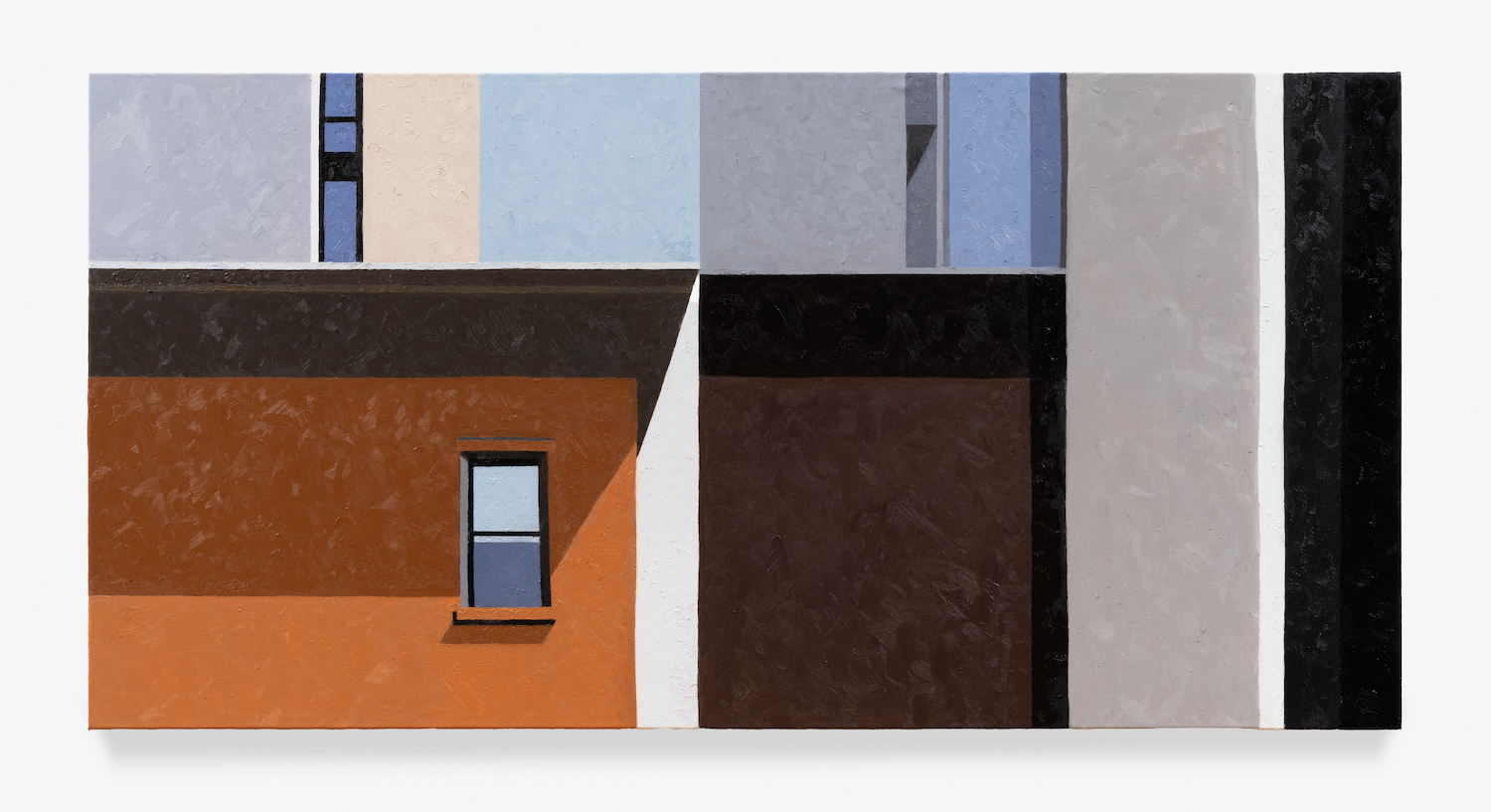
Roger Winter, Walls and Window, oil on canvas, 30 x 60 in, 2024

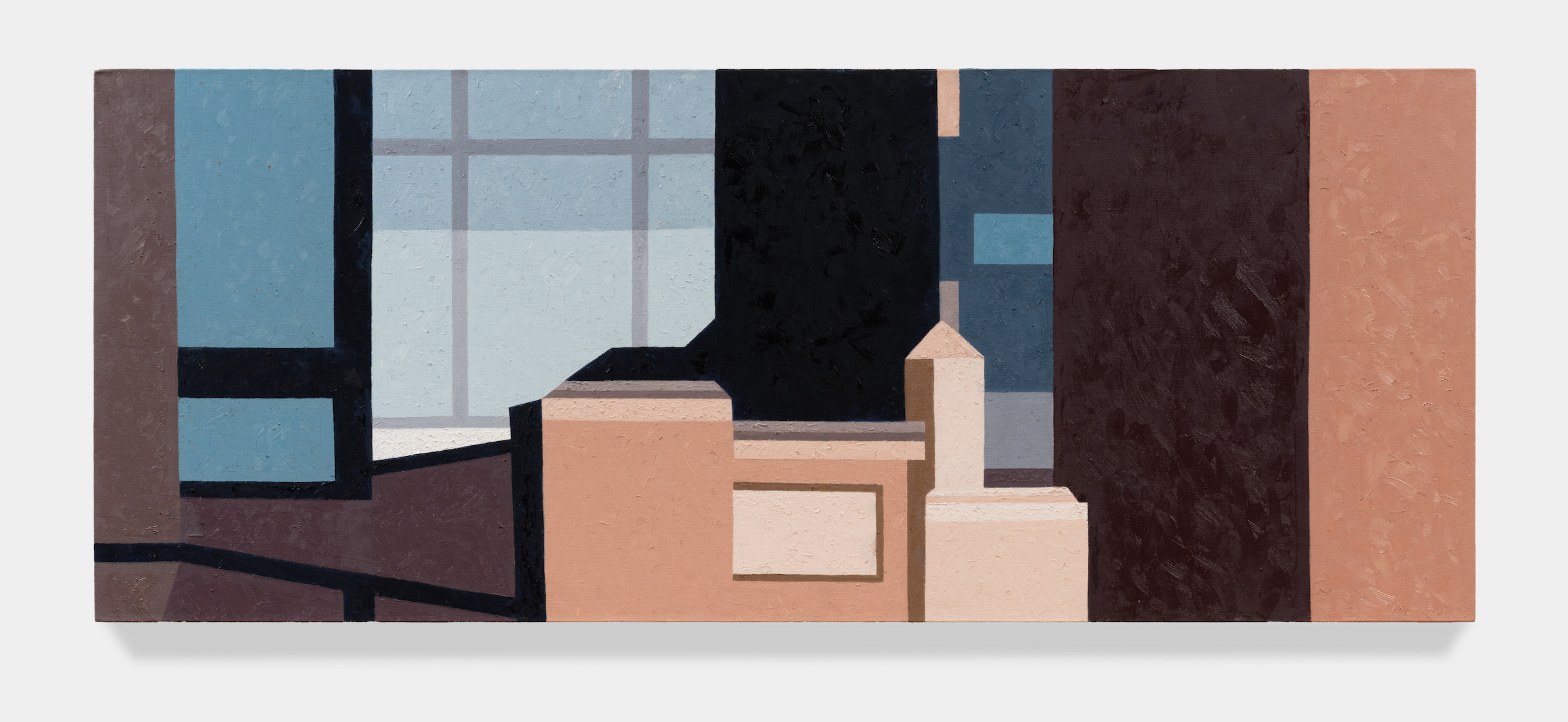
Roger Winter, Otican Window View, oil on linen, 24 x 60 in, 2024
