= Alice Dalton Brown =

American painter (born 1939)

- Born: April 17, 1939 (age 87); Danville, Pennsylvania, U.S.
- Education: Oberlin College, Cornell University
- Known for: Paintings, pastel drawings
- Style: Realism
- Spouse: Eric R. Brown (m. 1960–current)
- Website: Alice Dalton Brown

Alice Dalton Brown, Grand Westfield Porch, oil on linen, 54" x 138", 1980.

Alice Dalton Brown (born April 17, 1939) is an American painter known for realist works that capture the light and texture of specific, if often invented, places and moments. Her signature motifs include exteriors of Victorian houses, barns and waterscapes viewed through windows or sheer curtains, by which she explores the play of light, shadow, reflection and geometry across various surfaces. Critic J. Bowyer Bell wrote of Dalton Brown's style, "her realist works are more than the sum of their parts. In fact, there are so many parts so cunningly included, so many skills on display, that the result is almost an encyclopedia of what can be done."

Dalton Brown has exhibited at institutions including the Herbert F. Johnson Museum of Art, Butler Institute of American Art, Bronx Museum of the Arts, Albright-Knox Museum, and McNay Art Museum. She has been recognized by the American Academy in Rome and her work belongs to the public collections of the Metropolitan Museum of Art, Johnson Museum, Minneapolis Institute of Art, and Tampa Museum of Art, among others. After being based in New York City for over three decades, Dalton Brown splits time between Peekskill, New York and the state's Finger Lakes region, at Cayuga Lake.

== Early life and career ==
Dalton Brown was born in Danville, Pennsylvania in 1939 and grew up in Ithaca, New York. Her memories of the light, shadows and homes during her youth in the area would serve as later inspirations for her art. After high school, Dalton Brown studied art at the Académie Julian and the L'Université de Grenoble in France before majoring in English at Cornell University. After transferring to Oberlin College, she earned a BA in studio art in 1962, working in a realist vein at odds with the day's dominant abstract modes. She was greatly influenced at Oberlin by art historian Wolfgang Stechow and his discussions of compositional dynamics and iconography.

In the 1960s, Dalton Brown balanced family life and artmaking focused on images of interiors, figures and rural structures after a move to upstate New York. She and her family relocated to Greenwich Village, Manhattan in 1970, where she encountered in close proximity an art scene expanding from Abstract Expressionism into minimalism, conceptualism and various modes of realism. In 1975, she began exhibiting her paintings and collages of pastoral scenes. After turning to houses as subject matter, she attracted greater notice in the 1980s through solo shows at the A.M. Sachs and Katharina Rich Perlow galleries in New York and group exhibitions at the McNay Art Museum, Columbus Museum of Art and Minnesota Museum of American Art.

In her later career, Dalton Brown has had solo shows at Fischbach Gallery in New York (1987–2014), and Butler Institute of American Art (2018, 2019), and retrospectives at the Springfield Art Museum (1999), Johnson Museum of Art (2013) and My Art Museum (2021, Seoul).

== Work and reception ==
Alice Dalton Brown, Blues Come Through, oil on linen, 54" x 86", 1999.

Dalton Brown's work synthesizes various realist tendencies in a manner that evades easy placement within typical modes of contemporary realism or photorealism. For example, despite using reference photographs, she does not imitate their optical qualities, nor does she derive compositions directly from them, but rather, reconstructs, edits and collages reality freely to suit her purposes. Similarly, her painterly treatments of foliage, water and floorboards, eccentric compositional rhythms and perspectives, and level of psychological and emotional content introduce expressionist qualities at odds with more conventional realism. Art historian April Kingsley compares Dalton Brown's approach to those of Richard Estes and Edward Hopper, deeming her a "subjective realist." In addition to Hopper's influence, writers have cited Post-Impressionists such as Gauguin, Bonnard, Vuillard and van Gogh, the Dutch Old Masters, the 19th-century American sublime tradition, the American Precisionists, and Josef Albers (for his theories of color structure), as significant to her work.

Dalton Brown selects subjects such as houses and porches, barns, water and curtains for their evocative qualities regarding memory, the unconscious, identity and reality. Her contrasting surfaces and textures and captured ephemeral phenomena (light, wind, water) play up these aspects, as well as various oppositions: home and outside world, open and closed, soft and hard, solid or reflected form, obscured and visible, movement and stasis, order and disorder. She furthers these effects by omitting people and furniture from her scenes so that viewers can fully occupy the spaces; critics suggest that this pristine, vacant quality imbues the paintings with an almost surreal sense of mystery. Some writers have traced a chronological, physical and psychological trajectory in the evolution of Dalton Brown's work: from façade to porch to interior, then out windows and onto transcendent expanses of water.

=== "Barn" works (1965–77) ===
Between 1965 and 1977, Dalton Brown produced paintings and drawings of barns and silos, created "using photographic collage and the filters of artistic sensibility and memory" according to reviews. New York Sun critic David Grosz described her approach as "an art of archetypes, not particularities" which imparted "a quiet iconic aura" on its subject through simplified blocks of solid color interrupted by the play of sunlight and shadow. Over time, this work became increasingly abstract, as in the painting Shadow of Tree and Table (1977), a red barn façade framed in perpendicular white beams and slats and marked with amorphous crimson shadows with a red picnic table in front, visible only by its darker shadows; reviews compared such frontal flattening of space to the Cubist-informed representations of Charles Sheeler and Georgia O'Keeffe.

Alice Dalton Brown, Pool: Tropical Reflections, oil on linen, 50" x 105", 1989.

=== House paintings (1977–94) ===
In 1977, an empty country house in Westfield, New York caught Dalton Brown's attention and became the focus of a number of works, initiating a major new motif in her work: Victorian houses, viewed from outside and often expressive of a longing to be inside that some have variably regarded as feminist or Freudian. She was initially faithful to the observed time, place and season, but gradually moved toward compositions that didn't exist in reality by combining elements from different locations, perspectives or moments in time and variations in light, proportion and cropping. In some works, she painted fuller scenes, as in the eleven-foot-wide, largely white Grand Westfield Porch (1980); a frontal, partial façade of irregular archways, slender columns and decorative carved screens seemingly dislocated by a trick of perspective, it doubled as a study in geometric abstraction. In other works, she homed in on details—an arched window, a few steps, or part of a porch, as in the Kathy's Room series (1983).

The house paintings often focused on border or threshold spaces—gates, windows and porches that bridge inside and outside, public and private, and senses of beauty, threat or chaos. Such spaces enable Dalton Brown to explore different textures (e.g., architecture vs. foliage), hard and soft forms, and how plays of light (in shadows, reflections or on actual forms) can reveal objects in multiple ways. Beginning in the latter 1980s, she introduced a new intensity to this work—both coloristically and compositionally—that celebrated the vibrancy and unruliness of nature. These works depicted both northern and sun-drenched, semi-tropical settings and often featured dappled foliage, intricate patterns of shadow, reflections and pools, and brightly colored walls (e.g., Tropical Shadows, 1988; Pool: Tropical Reflection, 1989; Dappled Pink, 1992).

Alice Dalton Brown, Autumn Reverie, oil on linen, 75" x 107", 1998.

=== "Summer Breeze" and water series (1995– ) ===
In the mid-1990s, Dalton Brown shifted her perspective, with scenes from inside houses looking out, most characteristically with through open windows whose diaphanous, windblown curtains enlivened otherwise still, bare rooms with an implied human presence. Paintings with lake scenes, such as Summer Breeze (1995), Blues Come Through. (1999) and Whisper (2001), emphasized an active play of light, shadow and geometry on curtains, walls, floors and water through reflection, refraction and distortion. Art in America critic Gerrit Henry described them as works of eternal summer, "crystal clear in their psychological pantheism" with "a glistening apprehension of sun and weather" and an eye for the extraordinary amid the everyday. With works such as the elegiac Autumn Reverie (1998), Dalton Brown's emphasis shifted to the house's architecture and the varying visual effects created by windows, in that case within an elaborately conjoined triptych-like structure of transitional passage consisting of porch, doorway and interior.

In later, blue-dominated paintings of the sea, Dalton Brown often placed viewers right over the water in otherworldly compositions that excluded any framing devices, grounded only by barely present kite- or sail-like curtains (e.g., Nor Earth nor Boundless Sea, 2011). Her exhibition, "Nocturnes and Diurnes" (Fischbach, 2010), featured twelve paintings of shimmering waves that captured moments moving from morning to night. In a 2014 essay, art historian Maryan Ainsworth compared the effects of Dalton Brown's water paintings to the carefully constructed compositions and invented worlds of Dutch Old Master painters in terms of observational acuity, process and effects; she described the complex, opposing emotional responses they evoked— both liberation and loss of security—as moments "eternally there and eternally changing."

Dalton Brown's "Italy" series (2015–19) was initiated while she was a visiting artist at the American Academy in Rome. Its pastels and oil works focus on the warm light and textures of the area's everyday landscapes with views from both inside (through windows) and outside various villas. In 2021, My Art Museum in Seoul presented a retrospective of eighty Dalton Brown artworks, "Where the Light Breathes," which included three commissioned "Summer Breeze" paintings: "In the Quiet Moment," "Expectation" and "Lifting Light" (all 2021).

== Museum collections ==
Dalton Brown's work belongs to the public collections of the Allen Memorial Art Museum, Asheville Art Museum, Butler Institute of American Art, Johnson Museum of Art, Frost Art Museum, Maier Museum of Art, Metropolitan Museum of Art, Minneapolis Institute of Art, New York Public Library, Springfield Art Museum, Tampa Museum of Art, and Telfair Museums, among others, as well as to corporate, university and private collections.

== Exhibition catalogues and books ==
- Shin, Miri, Bora Kim and James Mullen. Alice Dalton Brown: Where the Light Breathes, Seoul: My Art Museum, 2021
- Zona, Louis. Pastels by Alice Dalton Brown, Youngstown, OH: Butler Institute of American Art, 2019
- Ainsworth, Maryan W. The Language of Angels, New York: Fischbach Gallery, 2014
- Wiles, Stephanie. Summer Breeze: Paintings & Drawings by Alice Dalton Brown, Ithaca, NY: Herbert F. Johnson Museum of Art, NY2013.
- Kingsley, April. The Paintings of Alice Dalton Brown, New York: Hudson Hills Press, 2002
