= Alia Muhammad Baker =

Iraqi librarian (1952–2021)

- عالية محمد باقر
- Born: Alia Muhammad Baker; 1952; Iraq
- Died: 13 August 2021 (age 68–69); Basra, Iraq
- Occupation: Librarian

Alia Muhammad Baker (Arabic: عالية محمد باقر; also spelled "Baqer" or "Baqir"; 1952 – 13 August 2021) was the chief librarian of the Al Basra Central Library in Basra, Iraq. Baker saved an estimated 30,000 books from destruction during the Iraq War, including a biography of Muhammad from around 1300.

== Rescue of the Basra Central Library ==
Baker had worked at the Basra Central Library for fourteen years prior to the United States-led invasion of Iraq. As a child she was told the story of the burning of Baghdad's Nizamiyya library and was horrified.

As war with the United States and United Kingdom loomed, government officials denied her requests that the books be moved to safety. When government offices moved into the library and an anti-aircraft gun was placed on the roof, she started to smuggle books out of the library.

With a Shi'ite population relatively unsupportive of the Hussein regime, Basra was one of the first targets in the 2003 invasion of Iraq beginning in November. Coalition forces met with more resistance than expected. Most of the invading American troops moved northwards, leaving Basra under a multi-week siege led by the British. The city was soon suffering from a "humanitarian crisis" in which residents lacked both water and electricity.

The invading forces (including the Royal Australian Air Force) used bombing and psychological warfare during the siege. Eventually, a large column of Iraqi tanks was destroyed by RAF bombs, and 300 prisoners were taken in a battle outside the city. British troops occupied the city on 6 April.

After the government employees vacated the building and the library furnishings were looted, Baker convinced Anis Muhammad , the owner of the restaurant Hamdan, to help her save the library's books. Baker enlisted the help of locals to smuggle the remaining books over the library's seven foot wall and into the dining room of the restaurant next door. Before the library was destroyed, Baker had rescued 70% of the library's collection: 30,000 books, including English and Arabic books and a Spanish-language Quran.

Baker and her husband rented a truck and distributed the books among library employees, friends, and their own home after things settled down in Basra. The library was rebuilt in 2004, and Baker was reinstated as chief librarian.

== Legacy and death ==
The story of how Baker rescued the library books has inspired several children's books. Alia's Mission: Saving the Books of Iraq, a graphic novel by Mark Alan Stamaty, was published by Knopf in 2004. Jeanette Winter's The Librarian of Basra: A True Story from Iraq was published by Harcourt in 2005. Harcourt donated a portion of the book's proceeds to an American Library Association-administered fund for rebuilding the Basra Central Library's collection. Both Stamaty and Winter's books were inspired by a July 2003 New York Times report by Shaila K. Dewan.

In 2013, S. Sivadas published a book about Baker in Malayalam entitled പുസ്തക മാലാഖയുടെ കഥ (Pusthaka maalaakhayute katha).

Baker died from COVID-19 in Basra on 13 August 2021, during the COVID-19 pandemic in Iraq.
