= John Moore (painter) =

American artist and painter (born 1941)

- Born: 1941 (age 84–85); St. Louis, Missouri, US
- Education: Ranken Technical College, Washington University in St. Louis, Yale University
- Known for: Painting, drawing
- Style: Realism
- Spouse: Sandra Moore
- Awards: American Academy of Arts and Letters, National Academy of Design, National Endowment for the Arts

John Moore, Turnstile, oil on canvas, 70" x 68", 2012.

John Moore (born 1941) is an American contemporary realist painter. His art has focused on studio interiors, still lifes, and in his best-known work, cityscapes and the American post-industrial landscape of dilapidated mill towns and factories. He emerged in the early 1970s amid a resurgence of representational work, appearing in many surveys and critical examinations that helped define new modes of American realism. While the highly detailed nature of his work evokes that movement, it diverges from approaches such as photorealism in its social concern, painterly handling and composite compositions, which distill direct observation, sketches, memories and photographs of multiple sites and views into re-imagined but believable scenes. Curator John Stomberg wrote of these constructed worlds: "The image he creates is only real in the painting, yet all the parts do have their origins in the observable world. Therein lies the eerie potency of Moore's vision—its plausibility. He is more of a spectacular fabulist than a realist."

Moore has been recognized by the American Academy of Arts and Letters and National Academy of Design and has exhibited at the Metropolitan Museum of Art, Philadelphia Museum of Art, Art Institute of Chicago, and Museum of Fine Arts, Boston. His work belongs to the public collections of those four museums, among others. He lives and works in Belfast, Maine with his wife Sandra, and is Professor Emeritus of Fine Arts of the University of Pennsylvania.

== Early life and career ==
John J. Moore was born in 1941 in St. Louis, Missouri, the oldest of four children of John Dewey Moore, a letter carrier, and Catherine Hurley Moore, a secretary. He studied mechanical drafting at Ranken Technical College and was hired as a draftsman and technical illustrator at McDonnell Douglas in St Louis in 1960. He turned to art full-time in 1962, attending Washington University in St. Louis (BFA, 1966), the Chautauqua Institution, and the Yale University summer program. In 1966, he enrolled at Yale and studied with Lennart Anderson, Lester Johnson, Richard Lindner and Jack Tworkov, earning an MFA in 1968. Shortly after, he was hired to teach at the Tyler School of Art of Temple University, where he served until 1988, when he became head of graduate painting at Boston University. In 1999 he was appointed chair of the Department of Fine Arts at the University of Pennsylvania, a position he held until retiring in 2009.

Moore began exhibiting his art in 1969, with early solo shows at the Pennsylvania Academy of the Fine Arts (PAFA, 1973), Fischbach Gallery (New York, 1973–1980) and Alpha Gallery (Boston, 1974). He was also included in realist surveys organized by the American Federation of Arts ("The Realist Revival," 1973) and Queens Museum (1974), among others. In subsequent decades, Moore has had solo exhibitions at Locks Gallery (Philadelphia, 1979–2021), Hirschl & Adler Modern (New York, 1983–2019), Boston College Museum of Art (1995), Greenville County Museum of Art (2010) and the Center for Maine Contemporary Art (2018). He appeared in surveys including "Real, Really Real, Super Real" (San Antonio Museum of Art, 1981), "Contemporary American Realism Since 1960" (PAFA, Virginia Museum of Fine Arts, 1982), "American Realism & Figurative Art: 1952–1990" (Miyagi Museum of Art, Japan, 1991), and "The American Dream" (Drents Museum, Netherlands, 2017).

Moore's early work centered on spare still lifes of ordinary objects on tables that built off modernism and sought to "draw feeling out of geometry." Offering greater studio control than other subjects, still lifes enabled him to pursue his true interests: the formal investigation of light, transparency and reflection, color, volume and perspective. Critics described his still lifes, variously, as "minimal realism verging on the metaphysical," "intellectual lyricism" and uncanny in their dead-on, unassuming presentation.

== Work and reception ==
John Moore, Thursday, oil on canvas, 92" x 141", 1980.

Moore's mature art has centered on three overlapping, recurring subjects: interior and studio views, cityscapes, and post-industrial landscapes. For inspiration, he draws fully on art history—from post-medieval and old master work through modernism, most specifically, early 20th-century Precisionist artists—as well as on the Midwest working-class culture of his upbringing. Moore places a contemporary concern for surface design in tension with traditional approaches to representation and spatial recession in order to explore vision and perception, the cultural effects of architecture, geography and social history. Despite the work's realism, critics have described it as almost surreal and subtly critical, due to its carefully orchestrated, sometimes disorienting rearrangements of views and angles, its evocation of time's passage, and play of contrasts such as industrial and natural, urban and residential, and permanent and timeworn.

=== Interior and studio views ===
In the late 1970s, Moore began extending his still lifes out to rooms that frequently included window views onto urban scenes. He continued to focus on color, light, shape (often variations on squares) and mood, while developing new interests in relationships between the observed and formal, perceived versus depicted size, and inside versus outside. In the early, frontal composition Thursday (1980), for example, he portrayed a mysteriously still, sparsely furnished loft in hushed light, centered by two symmetrical windows overlooking a city panorama.

Moore would return to the interior motif throughout his career. In Night Studio (1989), he narrowed on two massive loft windows surrounded by radiators, conduits and fluorescent lights, creating a head-on pictorial grid that framed and captured the subtleties of artificial light meeting a city's night-time ambiance. In many works (e.g., Peter's Park, 1996), he has highlighted the composite nature of his images, placing scrims of flowers, fencing or other foreground objects in front of panoramic views; these works often consider the plausibility of natural and urban worlds sharing space, juxtaposing the fragility and contingency of the former with seemingly permanent, "natural" and picturesque industrial structures.

In his 2003 show, "Near and Far", Moore made such pictorial strategies explicit in his title and in several complex urban compositions set off by grids of window sash and sill. The New Yorker described one such painting, Tie (2003), as an intricate work achieving "a kind of understated formality, a realism tuned by artifice" as it moved from heavy mullions to slender flights of utility wires and past a construction crane to distant smokestacks evoking a "visual fusillade of eight notes."

John Moore, Erie Evening, oil on canvas, 72" x 62", 1996.

=== Cityscapes ===
Moore's cityscapes scrutinize and celebrate the complexity of urban life—its piecemeal development, sense of mobility and visual diversity—while evoking a prosaic world of work, daily routine and history. His cityscapes evolved out of his interiors, when he eliminated the distance between viewer and window in several vertical works; in Lunch (1979), he abutted a foregrounded, cropped café tabletop against barely visible window frames containing a view of city rooftops and warehouses, while South (1979) sandwiched a geometric cityscape between monochromatic bands of wall and window frame.

He soon dispensed with the architectural framing, producing images that ranged from nearly abstract, flattened, largely generic views of San Francisco (in the early 1980s) to sprawling panoramas and neighborhoods convincingly distilled from scenes of Boston, Philadelphia, Barcelona and Tel Aviv. The cityscapes alternated between vertiginous scenes whose high horizon lines and deep space recalled old-master landscapes (Dutch Pink and Italian Blue, 1992–3) and tighter, street-level depictions (Waiting at St. Cecilia's, 1991–2). New York Times critic John Russell described Moore's approach as impartial, curious and never dull, writing, "His are not generous subjects. Nor do they ever have a hint of paradise regained. His cities have grown up every which way, in a more or less amiable architectural anarchy, and his small towns fight dereliction to a standstill."

Reviewers suggested that some of his neighborhood images combining urban and suburban scenes from different cities conveyed the "palpable isolation of modern architecture" with a feeling "both lonely and comforting." Edward Sozanski wrote that "deceiving ordinariness" of Pause (1989–93) was pregnant with anxiety deriving from an accumulation of unsettling details: an unattended baby carriage, homes backed against a factory complex, darkening skies and children peering into neighboring windows. In his later exhibition, "Here and There" (2021), Moore presented cityscapes that Hyperallergic wrote "marry the sharp angles and hard materials of bridges, factories, water towers and buoys with the lush beauty of a Maine bay’s sky at dusk." These works were described as darker than usual, with a mix of surrealism, loss and beauty in decay and an unresolved outlook, possibly reflecting the period of COVID during which they were painted (e.g., Vespers, 2020–1).

=== Post-industrial landscapes ===
John Moore, Departure, oil on linen, 54" x 72", 2021.

Moore has painted industrial sites—in Pennsylvania, Boston, St. Louis and Maine—for nearly four decades. Critics have characterized his industrial images as existing "in an unfixed present" encompassing several places, times and moods at once. In the 1980s, he first visited Coatesville, Pennsylvania, the location of the steel mills that Precisionists Ralston Crawford and Charles Demuth had portrayed. Moore's Coatesville paintings (Near Lincoln Highway, Coatesville, 1988; Coatesville, 1986–9) were reconsiderations of the site from a subtly critical, post-industrial vantage point that weighed utopian promises against a present haunted by the decline of American manufacturing. His images both celebrate structures such as smokestacks and factories and serve as elegies for the industrial past; unlike the pristine Precisionist images, they show wear—peeling paint, smudged windows, aging metal, neglected brick walls, spaces absent machinery—and a concern for integrating the sites into their social fabric.

Brooklyn Rail critic Robert Berlind wrote that Moore's later "workmanlike" paintings transformed industrial remains "into paradigms of a formal, Apollonian order" organized by foreground portals and architectural grids of glass brick and window mullions that acted "as foils to diverse optical surprises and momentarily disorienting pleasures." In Turnstile (2012), Moore relocated a rusted gate from a Coatesville mill to the front of the Bangor Waterworks Building, creating an interplay of decrepit and pristine, near and far, light and dark, entrance and barrier.

In a subsequent series of works that combined his interior and industrial motifs, Moore turned to the Globe Dye Works—a restored Civil War-era factory in the Frankford section of Philadelphia where his longtime studio was located. John Yau described one of these paintings, Distant Voices (2014–15), as a "vertigo-inducing" mix of Magritte and trompe-l'œil; its composition of skylights, windows and sky utilized multiple views and reflective surfaces to upend perceptions of up or down and perspective. Moore's depictions of the building's cavernous interiors, such as Fire Door (2014) and Departure (2021), recalled works by Vermeer and abstract expressionist color-field artists with large, rectangular panels of vivid and dark color set off by various patterns and distant city views. Other works, such as Frankford Station (2012), have been noted for their sections of glass block windows that "liquefied light, making for small, luminous abstractions or transformed descriptions of what is beyond them."

== Collections and recognition ==
Moore's work belongs to the public collections of the Addison Gallery of American Art, Art Institute of Chicago, Farnsworth Art Museum, McNay Art Museum, Metropolitan Museum of Art, Museum of Fine Arts, Boston, Pennsylvania Academy of the Fine Arts, Philadelphia Museum of Art, Portland Museum of Art, Rhode Island School of Design Museum, San Francisco Museum of Modern Art, and Yale University Art Gallery, among others.

He has been recognized with awards from the American Academy of Arts and Letters (1973, 1988, 1996), National Endowment for the Arts (1982, 1992) and National Foundation on the Arts and the Humanities (1966). In 2007, he was elected to the National Academy of Design and was given an Honorary Doctorate of Fine Arts by the Lyme Academy of Fine Arts in 2010.
