= Ernest Briggs =

American painter (1923–1984)

Ernest P. Briggs Jr.
- Born: December 24, 1923; San Diego, California, U.S.
- Died: June 12, 1984 (aged 60); New York City, New York, U.S.
- Occupations: Painter, educator
- Movement: Abstract Expressionist

Ernest P. Briggs Jr. (1923–1984), was an American painter. He was an Abstract Expressionist painter from the second-generation, he is known for his expressive and sometimes calligraphic brushwork, and his geometric compositions. His work caused a revolution in abstract painting that secured New York City's position as the art capital of the world during the post-World War II period.

== Biography ==
Briggs was born on December 24, 1923, in San Diego, California. He went on to serve in the U.S. Army Air Forces during World War II (1943–1946), where he spent 18 months in Tampa, and a year in India.

After the war, Briggs studied painting at the Rudolph Schaeffer School of Design in San Francisco, California (1946 to 1947), and later at the California School of Fine Arts, San Francisco (1947–1951; now the San Francisco Art Institute), where he thrived under the tutelage of such ab-ex greats as Clyfford Still, Ad Reinhardt, David Park, and Mark Rothko. According to New York Times critic Grace Glueck, Briggs was largely impacted by the "painterly rhetoric" of his teacher Clyfford Still during and after his time at CSFA.

Considered a member of the second generation of Abstract Expressionists, along with Giorgio Cavallon, Briggs left California for New York in 1953 where he began exhibiting at the Stable Gallery. During the 1950s, he was able to make a name for himself through his explosive and dynamic style as part of the New York City avant-garde. Briggs brought to the East Coast a fresh, lively aesthetic, reflecting what has been termed a "radical West Coast style" that he had continued to develop since his days at the California School of Fine Arts in San Francisco. He participated in several Whitney Museum Annuals and in 1956 was included in the Museum of Modern Art’s exhibition “12 Americans” curated by Dorothy Miller. He taught painting and sculpture at the Pratt Institute in Brooklyn from 1961 until the time of his death at age 61, and is survived by his wife Anne Arnold, who is also an artist.
