= Diana Kurz =

Austrian-American painter

- Born: 1936; Vienna, Austria
- Known for: Painting

Diana Kurz (born 1936, Vienna, Austria) is an Austrian-born feminist painter who is known for her Remembrance (Holocaust) series, which explores the "loss and preservation" of the artist’s family members during the Holocaust.

== Early life and education ==
In 1938, Diana Kurz's family fled Austria, first to England and then to the United States. Kurz spent her childhood in Brooklyn and Queens, New York. She earned her Bachelor of Fine Arts degree at Brandeis University (1957) and received a Master of Fine Arts degree in painting (1960) at Columbia University, where she studied with John Heliker, “one of the rare professors who encouraged his female students”, as Kurz later recalled.

== Work ==
Kurz was awarded a Fulbright Grant that gave her the opportunity to live and paint in France (1965–66), where Jean Hélion became a mentor. While there, she began to paint still life compositions that incorporated both living and inanimate objects, such as vases, bowls, and porcelain figures combined with flowers and vegetables; this was Kurz’s first attempt to merge images of impermanence with ones of deeper historical relevance. After returning from France, Kurz turned to figural compositions, which had interested her since 1963.

In the early 1970s, Kurz painted nude figures in her studio, from direct observation, often using mirrors to reflect fragments of their bodies, as in Rosaire at Window (1972). At the same time, she was responding intuitively to color and using numerous hues in her paintings She was influenced by Pierre Bonnard and Henri Matisse, and was more concerned with creating a compelling composition than addressing spatial illusions. Throughout the 1970s and 1980s, Kurz painted studio models and portraits. In 1981, she began an extensive exploration of still life in which she focused on arrangements of commercially produced ceramic objects, which she purchased inexpensively and chose for their lack of traditional aesthetic value.

Since the late 1960s, Kurz has identified as a feminist. She participated in the Women’s March for Peace (Jeannette Rankin Brigade) in Washington, D.C., in 1968 and joined the Women's Caucus for Art in 1972. She also exhibited in all-women and feminist shows, including First Open Show of Feminist Art (1971) in New York City. She was one of thirteen contributors to The Sister Chapel, a collaborative feminist installation that celebrated female role models. Kurz painted Durga (1977), for which she painstakingly studied numerous Indian examples and an actual devotee of the Hindu goddess, but retained her own distinctive painting technique. In the early 1960s, Kurz had begun to study Chinese and Japanese philosophy, as well as Eastern religion, which had a lasting influence on her approach to life and art.

Between 1989 and 2003, Kurz created Remembrance (Holocaust), a series of paintings that memorialized the members of her family murdered in the Holocaust. The large, over life-size figures were inspired by old photographs, which Kurz saw in the possession of an elderly aunt who lived in California. Instead of merely enlarging the black-and-white photographs, Kurz used her imagination to embellish them and incorporated text, letters, and other media. She used bright colors because, as she explained, “I was often struck by the irony of the fact that terrible, unspeakable things occurred while the sky was blue, the weather beautiful, birds singing, etc.” In Self-Portrait (1999), Kurz appears to stand in front of Vienna, another painting from the series. She leans with her elbows resting on a table, as if physically in the same space—for the first time—as those of her diseased relatives. As observed by Evelyn Torton Beck, Kurz’s “philosophy of painting closely parallels feminist theories of relationship and process: color is relational. Painting is very much about relationships.” In 1998, Kurz exhibited a number of paintings from her Remembrance (Holocaust) series at the Bezirksmuseum Josefstadt in her birthplace, Vienna.
