= Battle of Basra (1991) =

Part of the Iraqi uprisings following the Gulf War

Coordinates: 30.528°N 47.742°E

- Part of 1991 uprisings in Iraq
Date	1 March – 15 April 1991
Location	Basra, Iraq
Result	Iraqi government victory
Territorial changes	Parts of Basra captured by rebels, then recaptured by the Iraqi military.

Belligerents
Iraqi government: Republican Guard; Ba'ath Party loyalist forces	(Iraq) Army defectors

Commanders and leaders
(Iraq) Saddam Hussein	(Iraq) Abu Iman (POW)

Strength
6,000+	5,000 army deserters, unknown number of rebels associated with Shia opposition

Casualties and losses
Unknown	3,848 captured

The Battle of Basra was fought in the beginning of the 1991 Iraqi uprisings following the Gulf War. The battle started after demoralized troops throughout Iraq began to rebel against Saddam Hussein's Ba'athist regime, in particular after a tank driver in Basra fired at a public portrait of Saddam Hussein. Basra became a chaotic battlefield between military defectors and Republican Guard, with most of the fighting taking place at close quarters. Most of Basra had been retaken by mid March, but rebels in parts such as Tanuma managed to hold out until mid April. After Ba'athist forces had regained control, they engaged in a crackdown against civilians and suspected supporters of the uprising.

== Uprising ==
=== 1 March ===
The turmoil began in Basra on 1 March 1991, one day after the Gulf War ceasefire, when a T-72 tank gunner returning home after Iraq's defeat in Kuwait fired a shell into an enormous portrait of Saddam Hussein hanging over the city's main square and the other soldiers applauded.

=== 4 March ===
By 4 March, the forces loyal to Saddam Hussein had managed to gain the upper hand in the battle, and began a brutal counter-offensive characterised by the arbitrary killing of civilians, with government tanks reportedly firing at buildings and civilians and Republican Guardsmen engaging in massacres against the civilian population. The fighting entered a stand-still by early April and the local resistance and the Republican Guardsmen entered a truce.

== See also ==
Battle of Basra (2003)
