= Fischbach Gallery =

Former art gallery in New York City

Coordinates: 40°44′59.46″N 74°0′21.63″W

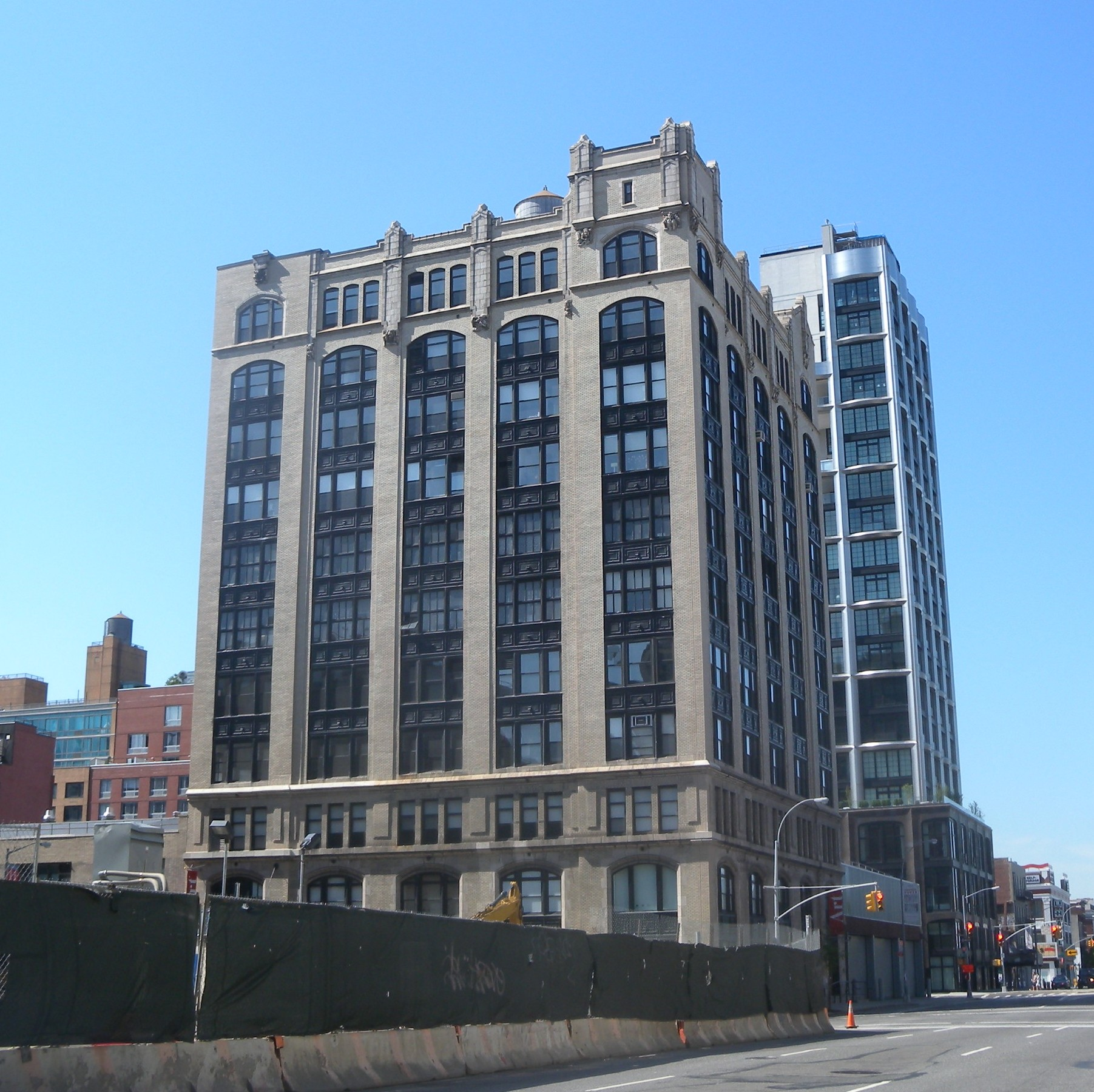
210 11th Avenue

The Fischbach Gallery was an art gallery in New York City. It was founded by Marilyn Cole Fischbach in 1960 at 799 Madison Avenue. The gallery in its early days became known for hosting the first significant solo exhibitions of now leading art world figures including Eva Hesse, Alex Katz and Gary Kuehn.

In 1966 the Fishbach Gallery opened the groundbreaking exhibition Eccentric Abstraction curated by Lucy Lippard which is considered the first Postminimal, art exhibition. The exhibition included Alice Adams, Louis Bourgeois, Gary Kuehn, Eva Hesse, Bruce Nauman, Don Potts, Keith Sonnier and Frank Lincoln Viner.

The Fischbach Gallery would later move to two consecutive locations on 57th Street. In the 1970s Marilyn Fischbach hired Aladar Marberger as gallery director. Marberger shifted the gallery's emphasis from Avant-Garde Art to Realism. The gallery included artists Leigh Behnke, Alice Dalton Brown, Lois Dodd, Jane Freilicher, Ian Hornak, Knox Martin, John Moore, Neil Welliver, and Roger Winter.

In the early 1980s, Marilyn Fischbach decided to take on three additional investors in the gallery, although she remained a partial owner until her death in 2003. One of the investors, Beverly Zagor, became an active partner until her death in May 2011. Another investor and active partner, Lawrence L. DiCarlo, is gallery director.

The Fischbach Gallery relocated to 210 Eleventh Avenue in New York. The gallery closed in 2015 and donated its records to the Smithsonian Institution.
