= Rijksmuseum Twenthe =

Art museum in Enschede, Netherlands

Coordinates: 52°13′40″N 6°53′49″E

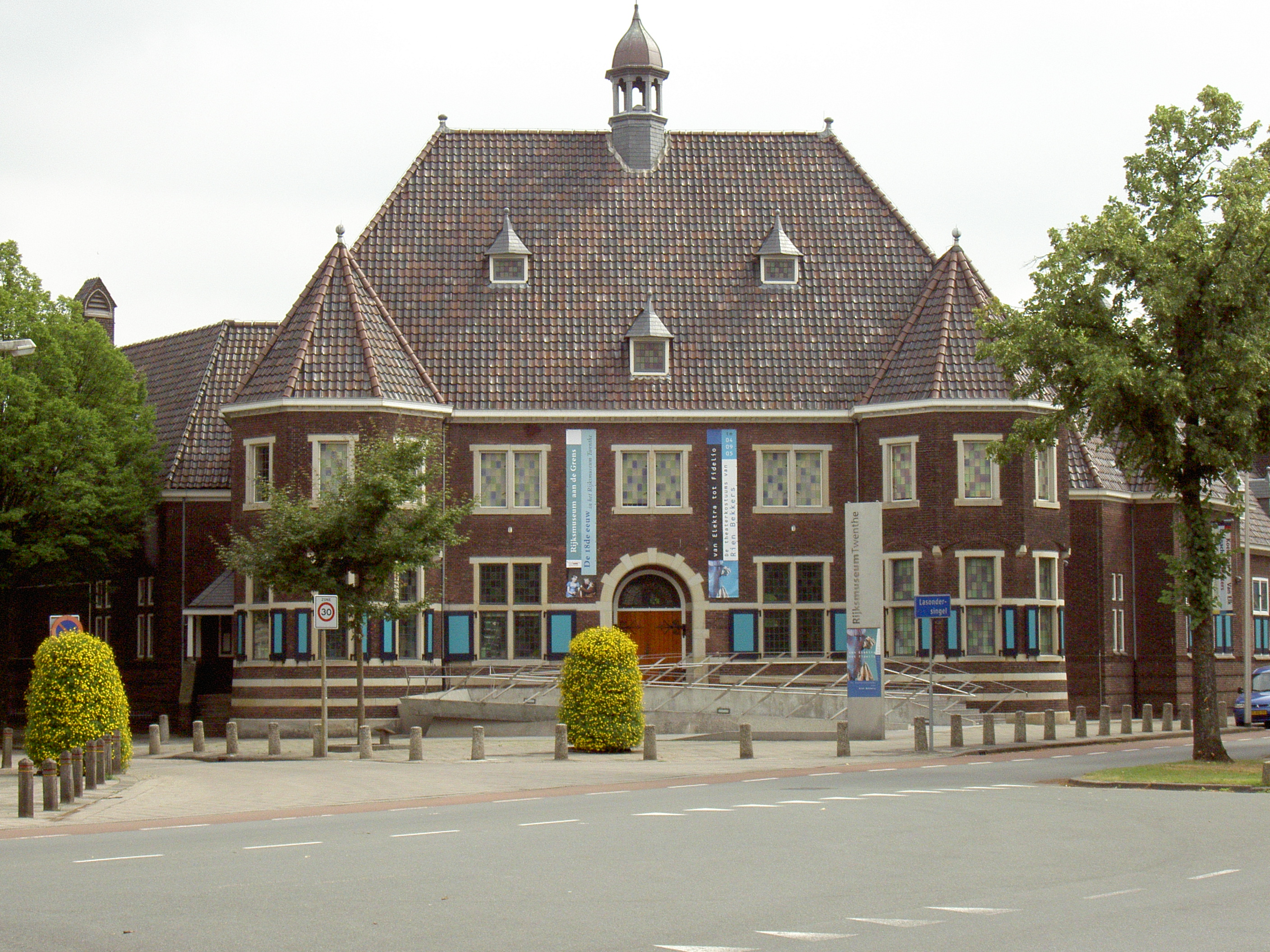
- The Rijksmuseum Twenthe in Enschede
- Established: 1927
- Type: Art museum
- Founder: Jan Bernard van Heek
- Website: rijksmuseumtwenthe.nl

The Rijksmuseum Twenthe in Enschede, the Netherlands, was founded in 1927 by textile industry Baron Jan Bernard Van Heek. He donated his own private collection and the museum building to the government, thus making it a national museum. The museum is situated in the quarter of Roombeek, 10 minutes on foot north-east from the railway station.

Throughout the decades, the museum has become focused on 18th-century art as well as contemporary works, with the collection of Art & Project, a former art gallery owned by Geert van Beijeren and Adriaan van Ravesteijn, as well as a large collection of animal paintings by Wilhelm Kuhnert, Carl Rungius and Bruno Liljefors. The museum also owns a large collection of 17th century (Jacob van Ruisdael and Salomon van Ruysdael) and 18th-century works, medieval books and religious objects, and some paintings of late 19th century Impressionists. The collection of 20th-century art is also important (Karel Appel, Armando). One wing of the museum is used for temporary exhibitions of mostly modern art. It is the largest art museum in the east of the country.

In 1996, the museum became a private organisation in the form of a foundation.

In 2000, the Enschede fireworks disaster did extensive damage to the building, but the collection of art was completely unharmed. The museum closed for nearly a year to do repairs.

From 2006 to 2008, the museum showed parts of the collection of the Amsterdam Rijksmuseum, especially art from the 18th century.
