= Ko Nakajima =

Japanese artist and photographer (1941–2025)

Kō Nakajima 中嶋興
- Born: 1941; Kumamoto, Japan
- Died: 2025 (aged 83–84)
- Occupations: Video artist, photographer, inventor
- Years active: 1965–
- Notable work: Aniputer, Animaker, Seizoki, Anapoko, Biological Cycle, My Life, Mt. Fuji

Kō Nakajima (中嶋興, Nakajima Kō; 1941 – 4 February 2025) was a Japanese video artist, photographer, and inventor based in Tokyo. His photographs of conceptual artist Yutaka Matsuzawa are a key resource for understanding Matsuzawa's practice. Video Earth, the collective Nakajima founded with his students at Tokyo College of Photography, is one of the earliest video collectives in Japan, roughly contemporaneous with Video Hiroba. Nakajima was also a prolific experimenter and inventor, working with Sony and JVC to create the Animaker and the Aniputer, respectively. Since the late 1960s he has participated in numerous international film and video festivals, and supported the work of younger generations of artists as a mentor.

== Biography ==
=== Early life ===
Nakajima studied art at Asagaya Academy of Design and Fine Arts and Tama Art University, graduating from the latter in 1965. He presented his early hand-drawn animated films Seizoki and Anapoko at the 1965 Animation Festival at Sōgetsu Art Center, with Seizoki earning him a prize and a screening in the International Shorts Festival of the 1967 Montreal Expo. These films were created by a technique he terms "kaki-mation," a neologism combining the Japanese term "kaki" (to write) with animation to indicate how he laboriously drew images by hand on discarded commercial film.

In 1969 Nakajima was assigned to photograph Psi Zashiki Room, a remote conceptual installation by artist Yutaka Matsuzawa, for the major art publication Bijutsu techō. Nakajima found the space so intriguing he shot over 1500 images there, using fish eye lenses and other techniques to overcome the challenges of the small space. These photographs have become central to recent explorations of Matsuzawa's dematerialized art practice.

Nakajima's work as a photographer and filmmaker in 1960s earned him a role in Expo '70 as the film director for the various moving images displayed in the Mitsui Pavilion, organized by Katsuhiro Yamaguchi. This further led to him being invited to work as an instructor at the Tokyo College of Photography from 1971 to 1980, a situation that allowed him request new video equipment to use in class instruction, establishing the core of a collaborative practice known as Video Earth.

=== Video Earth ===
Video Earth, also known as Video Earth Tokyo, was a video group Nakajima established through collaborations with his students at the Tokyo College of Photography. Its official starting date is listed between 1971 and 1973, due to the uncertainty about what act constituted the start of the group. Video Earth produced a number of early experiments with video cameras aimed at discovering the possibilities of the video medium, and their ultimate goal was to create a global network of video artists. Accordingly, the membership lists of Video Earth are expansive, incorporating both core members and temporary collaborators of Nakajima's, primarily tied together through their interactions with Nakajima himself.

Video Earth's experiments include a range of approaches. Several works document the local CATV networks that were developing in the Japanese countryside in the 1970s as means of regional community-based communication. The tapes Video Earth recorded both document the stations themselves, but also document the local communities with the intention of being replayed in local CATV networks as a kind of feedback loop.

The 1976 performance-turned-media-work entitled What is Photography?, on the other hand, was produced in a studio setting and now exists as a twenty-five minute video screened alongside a twenty-one minute slideshow. The performance documented was ostensibly a communal meal complete with table and plates, but at the center of the table was a nude female model and cameras were placed on the plates. Male photographers and a videographer surrounded the table, some with mouths taped, and each gave orders about the poses she should take at will, oftentimes competing for her attention. This resulted in discord and at some point the men began to strip and sat atop the table as the woman took a video camera in her hand and shot footage of them, ending with a celebratory gesture by the group. Due to its explicit content, the screenings of this work were limited, but the approach of recording the same subject in film and photography simultaneously was repeated in other Video Earth experiments as well.

Of the group's overall body of work, art historian Rika Iezumi Hiro writes:

Video Earth's performances, by contrast, were more radical and disturbing than these politically conscious and socially provocative documentary video works. For instance, they rolled a gigantic ball, like the kind multiple schoolchildren roll together at sports days, on the streets of Shinjuku, one of the busiest areas of Tokyo (date unknown); stole electricity from a bullet train to cook rice while traveling in it (ca. 1975); and had a mobile picnic in a Tokyo subway car with unwitting passengers before running away after only a few stations [Shokutaku ressha ("Dining table train")/Video Picnic, 1975].

Iezumi thus sums up their production as an investigation of the power relations created by the new, ostensibly accessible technology of video. She argues they both produced communal situations by employing the camera as a communications tool, and employed the camera as "a tool of creation and authoritative power, allowing it to disturb the everyday."

=== My Life ===
An work ongoing since 1974, My Life records significant life events of Nakajima and his nuclear family members, focusing on emotionally intense moments. The work was originally inspired by, and initially captured, the death of his mother and the birth of his daughter. These images were placed side-by-side, forcing viewers to shift attention between the two channels, thereby creating a "first-person feel to the work that refuses exteriority and pure objectivity." Nakajima continues to add footage to this work and imagines a time when his own funeral will be captured by his offspring, or perhaps even by an AI surrogate.

=== Biological and ecological video works ===
Biological Cycle is a series of videos Nakajima produced from 1971 to 1984. The imagery in the series focuses most heavily on an ostrich, a pregnant woman, and a furiously cycling man, but is heavily manipulated. This was accomplished by first recording the images on film and writing on them, then superimposing positives and negatives as well as running the footage through various commercial video synthesizers. Art historian Nina Horisaki-Christens positions this approach to remediation, in which successive versions of the footage incorporate increasingly complex visual effects, as indicative of an ecological continuum that ties together machine and biological life.

Since the 1980s Nakajima has produced a series of works, often featured in video and media festivals, that use synthesizers to manipulate images related to the environment. Works in this vein include Mt. Fuji (1984), Dolmen (1987), Rangitoto (1988), and Waveforms (1989). Such interest in ecological themes carried into Nakajima's 1990s video installation works that combined natural elements, such as chopped tree trunks and piles of sand, with disassembled, broken, or otherwise damaged technology salvaged from junk yards and garbage dumps. He composed these assemblages in forms inspired by Jōmon period tomb forms to create installations intended to both celebrate and reflect on the material realities of defunct technologies.

=== Inventions and technology ===
Working with Sony engineers in the 1970s, Nakajima developed a frame-by-frame recording device for Sony Betamax video cameras called the Animaker. A kind of video synthesizer, the Animaker could facilitate both time-lapse and stop-motion sequences in a native video format, as well as process electronic effects. Eventually such a frame-by-frame function became common in consumer cameras. He also worked with JVC to develop the Aniputer, "an animation device that combines a video camera and a personal computer. Using joysticks instead of a keyboard, artists can use the Aniputer to create animation in real time without any preliminary training." In recent years Nakajima has also been involved in the promotion and preservation of utsushi-e, or Edo period magic lantern shows. Nakajima describes these as the earliest form of native Japanese animation.

== Major exhibitions ==
Video Show, American Center, West Berlin, 1974

Video Channel, Video Inn, Vancouver; Video Head, Paris; Global Village, NY, 1975

Japan Video Art Festival: 33 artists at CAyC, Centro de Arte y Comunicación, Buenos Aires, Argentina, 1978

Video from Tokyo to Fukui and Tokyo, Museum of Modern Art, NY, 1979

Documenta 8, Kassel, 1982

New Video: Japan, Museum of Modern Art, NY, 1985

New Tools, New Images, Museum Van Hedendaagse Kunst Antwerpen, Belgium, 1989

Japanese Art after 1945: Scream Against the Sky, Guggenheim Museum Soho, NY; Yokohama Museum of Art, Yokohama; San Francisco Museum of Modern Art, 1994

Vital Signals: Japanese and American Video Art from the 1960s and 70s, Los Angeles County Museum of Art, USA, 2009

Video Life: Nakajima Ko + Kentarō Taki, St. Paul ST, Auckland City, NZ, 2011

Nakajima Ko Exhibition and Screening, WhiteBox, NY, 2019

Radicalism in the Wilderness, Japan Society, NY, 2019

Archives XIX & Pleating Machine 3: Nakajima Ko—My Life, Keio University Art Center, Tokyo, 2019

== Select film and media festivals ==
Sōgetsu International Animation Festival, Sōgetsu Hall, Tokyo, 1966

International Short Film Festival, Montréal World Expo, Canada, 1967

International Experimental Film Festival, Cinematheque Royale de Belgique, Brussels, 1974

SIGGRAPH, CG Conference (collaboration with JVC), 1982

SIGGRAPH Film and Video Show, 1983, 1985

SIGGRAPH Electronic Theater, 1984

International CG Conference, Montecarlo, France, 1985

International Video Festival, Locarno, Switzerland, 1988

TV New Zealand Kaleidescope television screening series, 1988

International Video festival "Video-Nale" revival screening and workshop, Bonn, Germany, 1989

International Film Festival, Oberhausen, Germany, 1994

== Collections ==
Centre Georges Pompidou, Paris, France

Getty Research Institute Special Collections, Los Angeles, US

Long Beach Museum of Art Video Archive, Long Beach, US

The Museum of Modern Art, NY, US

ZKM | Center for Art and Media Karlsruhe, Germany
