= Schuil =

Schuil is a surname. Notable people with the surname include:

- Han Schuil (born 1958), Dutch artist
- Richard Schuil (born 1973), Dutch beach volleyball player
