= Alan Charlton =

Alan Charlton may refer to:

- Alan Charlton (diplomat)
- Alan Charlton (artist)
