= Geert van Beijeren =

- Born: Geert Kornelis van Beijeren Bergen en Henegouwen; 30 November 1933; Leeuwarden, Netherlands
- Died: 6 March 2005 (aged 71); Slootdorp, Netherlands
- Occupations: Art dealer and art collector
- Known for: Art & Project
- Partner: Adriaan van Ravesteijn
- Website: rkd.nl

Geert van Beijeren (20 November 1933 in Leeuwarden – 6 March 2005 in Slootdorp) was a Dutch gallerist at Art & Project, curator and art collectors in the Netherlands, where he and Adriaan van Ravesteijn founded the Dutch art gallery Art & Project.
