= Adriaan van Ravesteijn =

Dutch gallerist and art collector

- Born: Willem Adriaan van Ravesteijn; 2 April 1938; Amsterdam, Netherlands
- Died: 6 January 2015 (aged 76); Laren, North Holland, Netherlands
- Occupations: Art dealer and art collector
- Awards: Order of Orange-Nassau (2014)
- Website: rkd.nl

Willem Adriaan van Ravesteijn (Amsterdam, 2 April 1938 – Laren, North Holland, 6 January 2015) was a Dutch gallerist and art collector in the Netherlands. He and Geert van Beijeren founded the leading Dutch art gallery Art & Project (1968–2001) and publishers of the art magazine of the same name (1968–1989). During its thirty-year existence, the gallery as well as the magazine made substantial contributions to the Dutch art climate.

== Biography ==
Van Ravesteijn studied architecture at Delft University of Technology around 1960.

In Amsterdam-Zuid in September 1968 he and a friend opened their own gallery, Art & Project, which Van Ravesteijn ran and which exhibited artists including Gilbert & George, Sol LeWitt, Daniel Buren, and Lawrence Weiner.

In June 2014, Van Ravesteijn was awarded a knighthood in the Order of Orange-Nassau.

== Art collection "depot VBVR" ==
The largest part of the collection, approximately a thousand works, has been gradually handed over to the Rijksmuseum Twenthe in Enschedé. Other Dutch museums that received loans from the Van Beijeren-Van Ravesteijn collection are the Gemeentemuseum in The Hague, the Museum Boijmans van Beuningen in Rotterdam and the Kröller-Müller Museum in Otterlo. In 2008, after the death of Geert van Beijeren, the Museum of Modern Art in New York City received a collection of some 230 prints, books, posters, photographs and other ephemera from Art & Project co-founder Adriaan van Ravesteijn. The gallery's archives and the owners' personal archives are kept at the Netherlands Institute for Art History (RKD).

In 2009, the Museum of Modern Art staged an exhibition entitled "In & Out of Amsterdam", drawing largely on the Van Ravesteijn-Van Beijeren bequest.

=== Gift to the Kröller-Müller Museum ===
In 2013, Van Ravesteijn donated a significant part of the Art & Project collection to the Kröller-Müller Museum. This donation contained over 200 works of art, mostly sculptural works by Dutch artists such as Ger van Elk, Jos Kruit, Carel Visser and Leo Vroegindeweij, and international artists as Carl Andre, Adam Colton, Tony Cragg, Barry Flanagan, Hamish Fulton, Richard Long, Andrew Lord, Juan Muñoz, Willy Ørskov and Nicholas Pope.
