= Helma Neppérus =

Dutch politician

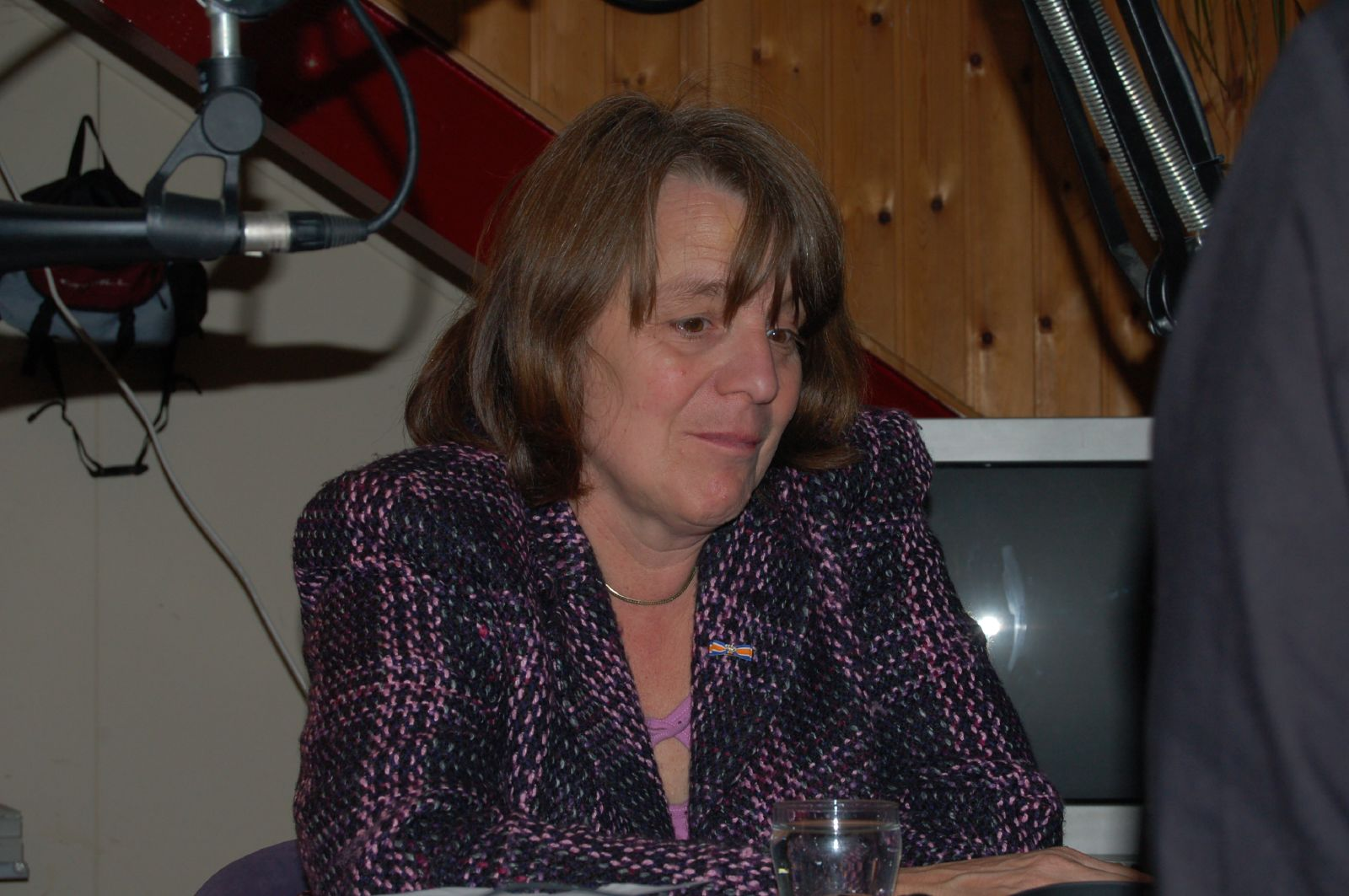

Member of the House of Representatives
- In office 30 November 2006 – 23 March 2017

Personal details
- Born: 21 June 1950 (age 76) Amsterdam
- Party: People's Party for Freedom and Democracy
- Occupation: Politician

Helma Neppérus (born 21 June 1950, in Amsterdam) is a Dutch politician and former tax inspector and rower. As a member of the People's Party for Freedom and Democracy (Volkspartij voor Vrijheid en Democratie) she was an MP between 30 November 2006 and 23 March 2017. She focused on matters of taxation.

== Biography ==
Neppérus studied at the School of Journalism in Utrecht and (tax) law at Leiden University. She was a member of the Royal Students Rowing Club Njord and rowed in the Dutch rowing team. At the Olympics, she was active as an umpire at the rowing. She later held various administrative positions in the rowing world, including the Royal Dutch Rowing Federation (KNRB) and the International Rowing Federation. In 1991 she was appointed an honorary member of the KNRB. She also worked for the Revenue and the Ministry of Finance. She was a board member of the VVD in Voorschoten from 2000 to 2002. In 2002, she was elected into the municipal council of Voorschoten. From 2004 to 2007 she was also VVD fraction leader. In 2005 and 2006 she worked for the Inspectorate (IVW) of the Ministry of Transport. In the 2006 parliamentary elections Neppérus was on the candidate list of the VVD and was elected into the House of Representatives of the Netherlands.
