= Yutaka Matsuzawa =

Japanese artist

- Born: February 2, 1922; Shimosuwa, Nagano Prefecture, Japan
- Died: October 15, 2006 (aged 84)
- Education: Waseda University, Wisconsin State College–Superior, Columbia University
- Movement: conceptual art

Yutaka Matsuzawa (松澤宥, Matsuzawa Yutaka; February 2, 1922 – October 15, 2006) was a pioneer conceptual artist. He was active from the 1950s until his death in central Japan.

== Life and education ==
Matsuzawa was born on February 2, 1922, in Shimosuwa in mountainous central Japan. His impressionable years were spent during Japan's Fifteen-Year War (1930–45), which encompassed the Mukden Incident, Second Sino-Japanese War and Pacific War. Like his peers On Kawara, Yoko Ono, Genpei Akasegawa and Shusaku Arakawa, his experiences with wartime Japan shaped him as an artist and led him to rejecting the status quo.

He studied architecture from 1943 to 1946 at Waseda University in Tokyo, but two years after graduating, he gave up architecture, returned to his hometown and taught mathematics at a night school. It was during this time that he also turned his attention to poetry and art, interests he had developed during college.

In 1955, Matsuzawa left Japan to go to the United States on a Fulbright Fellowship. He spent one year as a visiting scholar at Wisconsin State College–Superior (now University of Wisconsin–Superior). Shortly thereafter, he considered going to Massachusetts Institute of Technology to study with the designer and painter György Kepes but declined the invitation. Instead, in summer 1956, he moved to New York on a Japan Society fellowship, where he studied religion, philosophy and art history at Columbia University.

While in New York, Matsuzawa encountered the work of Jackson Pollock at the Museum of Modern Art as well as Robert Rauschenberg. He also met the abstract painter I. Rice Pereira and learned of John Cage's work through the publication trans/formation. In 1957, Matsuzawa left New York and returned to Japan.

Matsuzawa died on October 15, 2006.

== Work and career ==
From his time in New York, Matsuzawa was informed by parapsychology and developed his idea of Psi. Psi derived from psi powers or cognitive abilities beyond the five senses, such as precognition and clairvoyance. He employed this idea in works such as Psi Bird (1959), Meaning of Psi (1960), Psi Altar (1961), Peep into the Psi Tortoise, the Winged Secret Rules (1962) and Invitation to Psi Zashiki Room (1963). These works helped Matsuzawa to establish his own sense of conceptualism. By the end of 1963, Matsuzawa had gained the nickname Mr. Psi.

In 1964, Matsuzawa experienced a revelation in which he heard a voice commanding, "Vanish objects!" He believed the voice was instructing him to employ language in his art, so he subsequently began creating artwork solely from text. This marked the beginning of his body of work concerning the concept of "kannen", which means "idea" (as in metaphysics and "meditative visualization" in Pure Land Buddhism). This can be seen in his work White Circle (1967), which consisted of a photograph with a portion blanked out, and viewers were instructed to envision a circle with their eyes closed. In doing so, Matsuzawa sought to eliminate the material aspect of his art, and he relied on viewers' minds to visualize the invisible aspect of his artwork. Matsuzawa's interests in nothingness and void were largely inspired by Buddhism. He offered an alternative to European and North American conceptualism ideas of dematerialization, a redefining of the art object and its meaning. This was radical for an artist in Japan at the time.

Matsuzawa was charismatic and, beginning in 1969, his estate in Suwa became a gathering place for like-minded artists and critics. This following became known as the Nirvana School. Its membership included the younger conceptual artists Michio Horikawa and Tadashi Maeyama of GUN. Together, the Nirvana School artists exhibited their work in 1970 at Nirvana: For Final Art and at the 1973 Kyoto Biennale, both held at the Kyoto Municipal Museum of Art.

In 1970, Matsuzawa was invited to participate in Tokyo Biennale 1970: Between Man and Matter curated by the critic Yūsuke Nakahara. The biennial was a significant moment in postwar Japanese art and it was instrumental in putting Tokyo on the map within the international art world. There, Matsuzawa exhibited alongside fellow conceptual artists Daniel Buren, Hans Haacke, Michio Horikawa, On Kawara, Sol LeWitt, Mario Merz and Jiro Takamatsu. The biennial was Matsuzawa's first international exposure in his professional career.

Within the same year as Tokyo Biennale 1970, Matsuzawa met Adriaan van Ravesteijn, the director of the Art & Project gallery in Amsterdam. Through Art & Project, Matsuzawa published in two issues of the gallery's art magazine, Bulletin 20 and Bulletin 21. Matsuzawa's issue of Bulletin 21 was subsequently featured in the catalog for the conceptual art exhibition Information at the Museum of Modern Art in New York later that summer.

Throughout the 1970s, Matsuzawa shifted his focus away from anti-art sentiments, but he maintained an interest in challenging the modernist institution of art. His work as a conceptual artist steadily gained recognition with the increasing awareness of Euro-American conceptual art in Japan.
