= Art & Project =

Former art gallery in the Netherlands

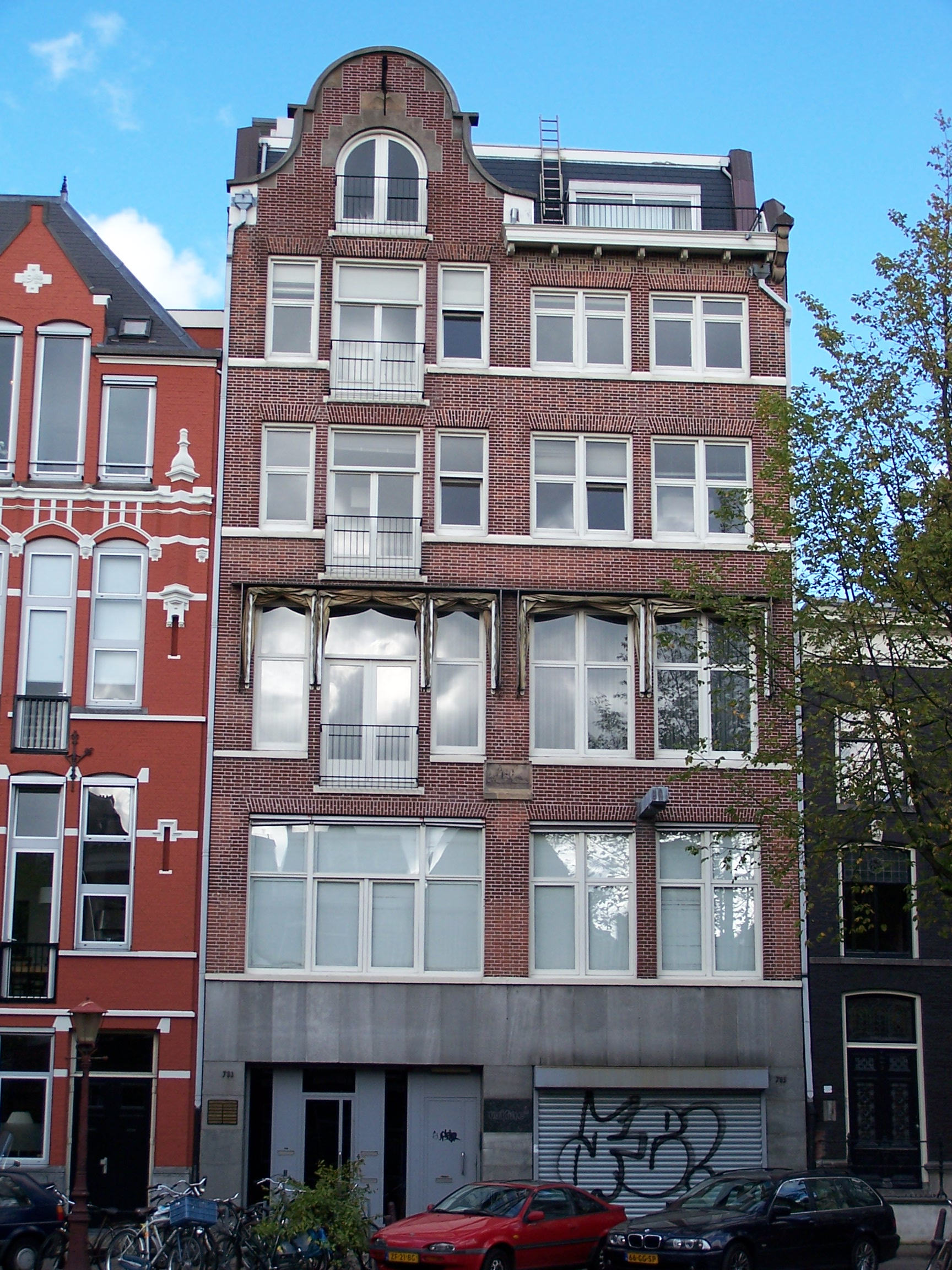
- Location of the Art & Project gallery at the Prinsengracht from 1979 to 1989
- Location: Amsterdam, Antwerp
- Origins: Founded in 1968; Dissolved in 2001
- Key people: Geert van Beijeren & Adriaan van Ravesteijn (founders)

Art & Project was a leading contemporary art gallery by Geert van Beijeren & Adriaan van Ravesteijn from 1968 to 2001 in Amsterdam and Slootdorp, the Netherlands, as well as an influential art magazine published by the gallery between 1968 and 1989.

== History of the art gallery ==
=== Opening in 1968 and first years ===
The Amsterdam gallery Art & Project, led by Geert van Beijeren & Adriaan van Ravesteijn, opened in September 1968 in Van Ravesteijn's parental home in Richard Wagnerstraat in Amsterdam-Zuid. The first exhibition was with German artist Charlotte Posenenske and the second was about the Dutch architect and design duo Jan Slothouber and William Pars Graatsma. This drew some attention due to the first two Art & Project Bulletins, a hundredfold of them send nationwide. The early focus was on architectural research and other early exhibitors included Gruppe X, Paul Schuitema and Aldo van den Nieuwelaar.

Initially the gallery was open only during evening hours and weekends; later also in the afternoon. No invitations were sent; there were no vernissages. Also in 1968, the first issue of Art & Project Bulletin appeared, a magazine through which the gallery built an artistic network and enabled artists to have "exhibitions by mail". In the first years they brought about six exhibitions a year.

From May 1969 onward, the gallery focused on conceptual artists, such as Stanley Brouwn, Daniel Buren, Jan Dibbets, Gilbert & George, Douglas Huebler, Sol LeWitt and Lawrence Weiner. In March 1970, Gilbert & George repeated in Van Beijeren and Van Ravesteijn's gallery their famous Posing on Stairs performance as living statues at the Stedelijk Museum a few months earlier.

==== Photo gallery ====
Some examples of the type of works of the artists and artists presented at Art & Project in the Netherlands in the early years of the gallery.

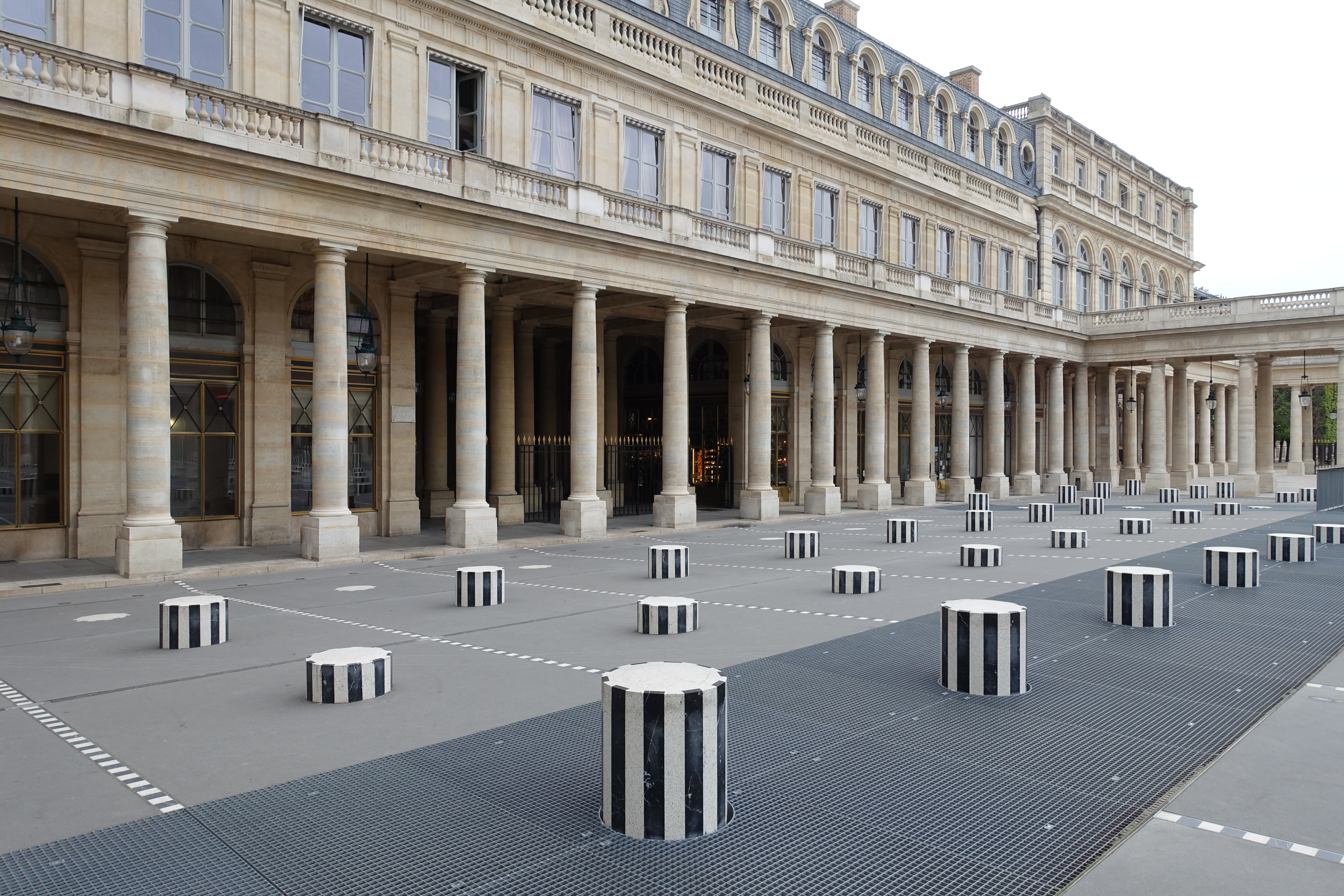
Colonnes de Daniel Buren, Palais Royal Paris

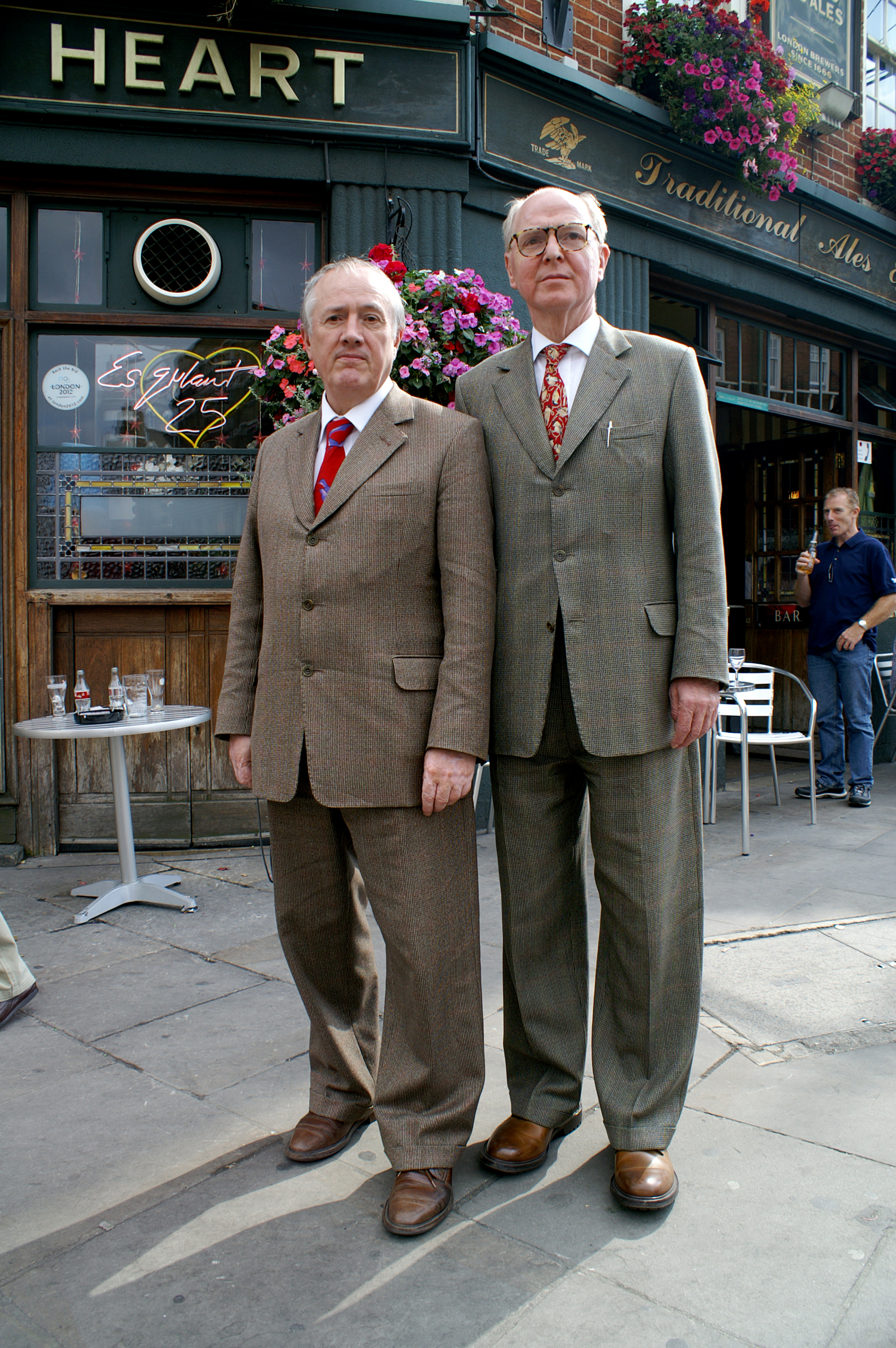
Gilbert & George

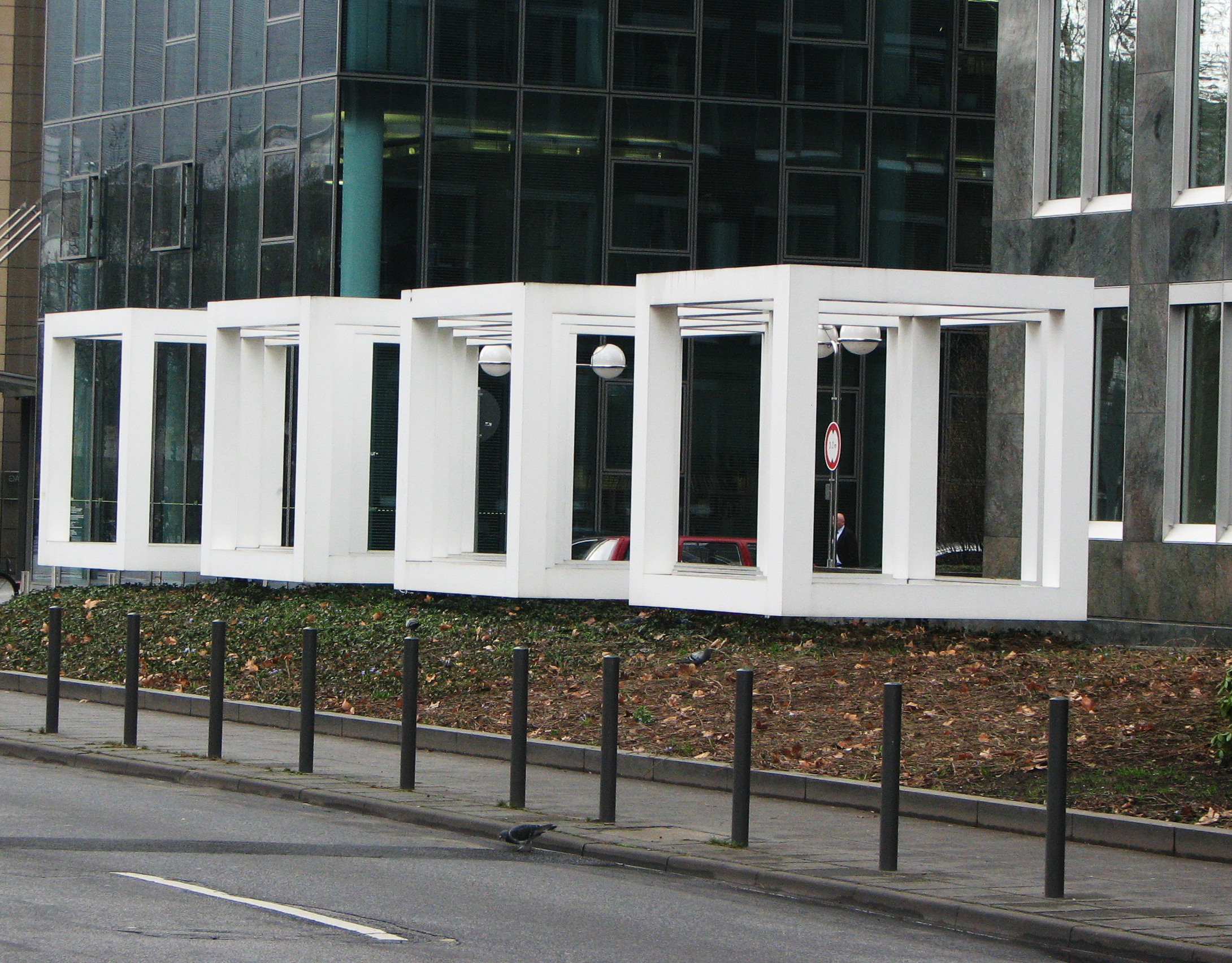
Open Cubes by Sol LeWitt

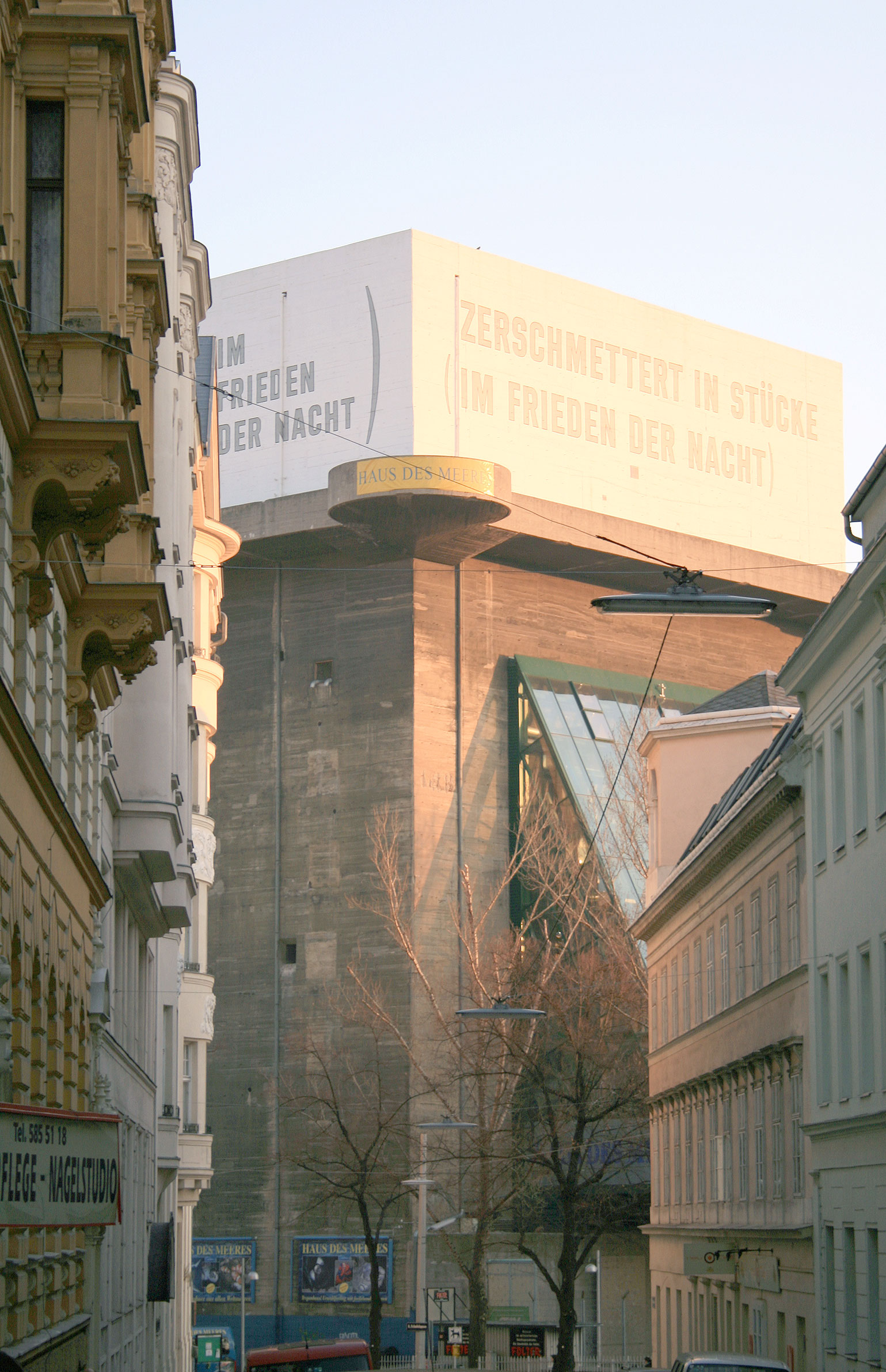
Flakturm at Esterházypark, Vienna by Lawrence Weiner

=== Van Breestraat 18, Amsterdam and Antwerp ===
In 1971 the gallery moved to Van Breestraat 18, close to the Stedelijk Museum and right opposite Riekje Swart's gallery, the other contemporary art gallery in Amsterdam with an international outlook. In 1973, Art & Project moved to nearby Willemsparkweg 36, where it would stay for the next six years.

In 1973 also, the gallery opened an art space in Antwerp in cooperation with the Brussels gallery MTL (led by Fernand Spillemaeckers). In this gallery, named Art & Project / MTL, eleven solo exhibitions were staged in 1973 and 1974. Other galleries that Van Beijeren and Van Ravesteijn were in close contact with, included Konrad Fischer in Düsseldorf, Yvonne Lambert in Paris, Sperone in Turin, Jack Wendler in London and Claire Copley in Los Angeles.

=== Prinsengracht 785 ===
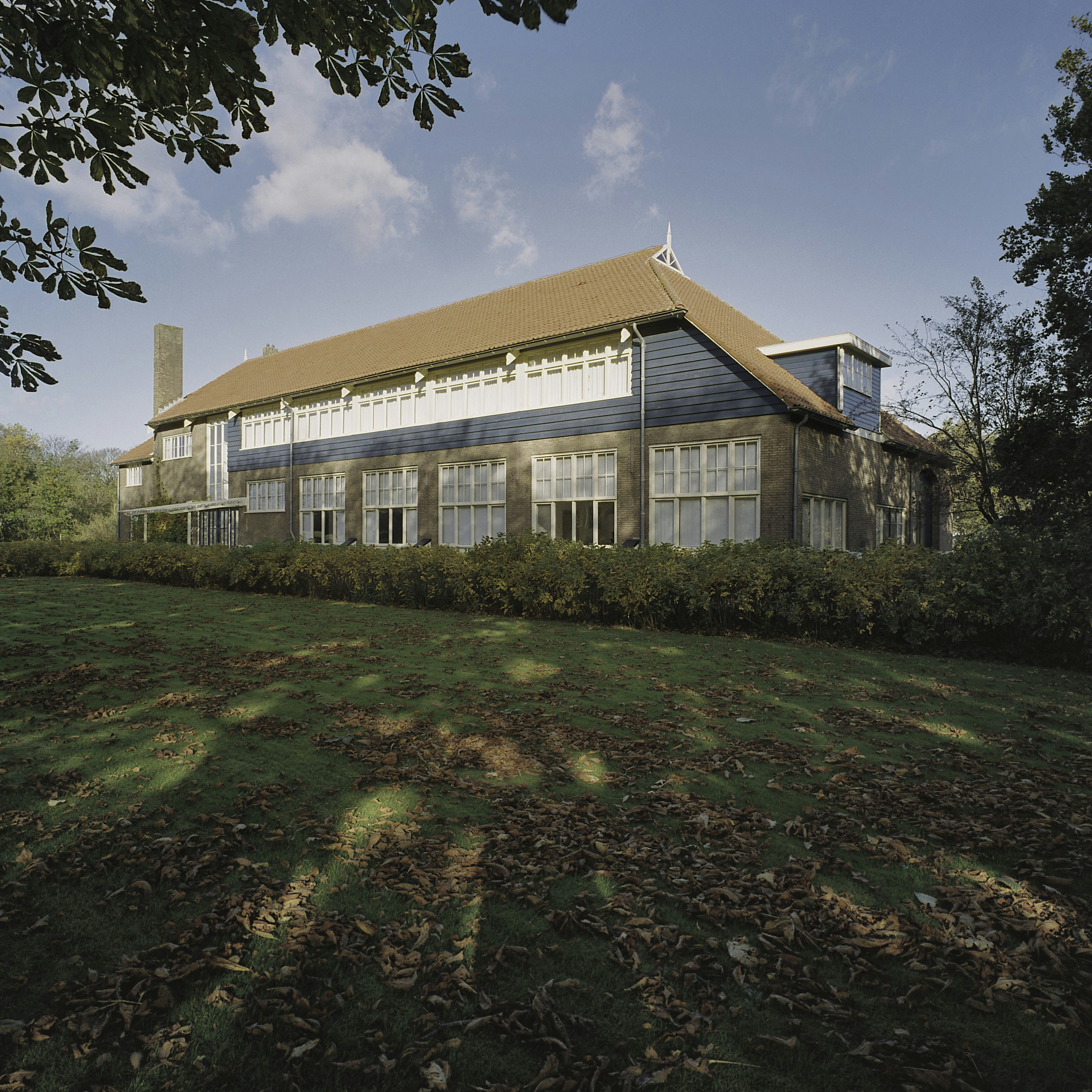
Location of the gallery in Slootdorp (1990-2001)

From 1979 until 1989 the gallery was based at Prinsengracht 785, after which it moved to Slootdorp, a remote village in the North of the Netherlands. The gallery closed in December 2001. Geert van Beijeren died a few years later.

=== Artists ===
For more than 30 years, Art & Project was one of the Netherlands' major platforms of contemporary art. From the start of the gallery, it supported an international group of artists that was mostly associated with Minimal Art, Conceptual Art and Land Art.

The following artists were involved with the gallery (and the bulletin): Barry Flanagan, Douglas Huebler, Lawrence Weiner, Sol LeWitt, Robert Barry, Carl Andre, Alan Charlton (artist), Joseph Kosuth, Richard Long, Andrew Lord, Stanley Brouwn, David Tremlett, Gilbert & George, Alighiero Boetti, Francesco Clemente, Allen Ruppersberg, Marcel Broodthaers, John Baldessari, Hamish Fulton, Jan Dibbets, Ian Wilson, Bas Jan Ader, Han Schuil and Daniel Buren.

Among the gallery's clients were important art collectors in the Netherlands and Belgium such as Edy de Wilde (director Stedelijk Museum, 1963-1985), Benno Premsela, Martin and Mia Visser, Frits and Agnes Becht, Herman and Nicole Daled, and Anton and Annick Herbert.

== The art magazine ==
The cover of Art & Project, Bulletin #89, August 1975

Between September 1968 and November 1989 Geert van Beijeren & Adriaan van Ravesteijn published 156 bulletins of the influential art magazine Art & Project. The first magazines were merely announcements of upcoming exhibitions in the Art & Project gallery. Later editions more and more took the form of art objects.

Art & Project was meant to be a monthly magazine but was not always published regularly (17 in 1972; only 8 in 1973). Between June 1983 and December 1984 no magazines were published at all. The magazine was printed in The Hague by printshop Delta in an edition of 800. The format was generally A3, which was folded and thus formed four A4 pages. It was generally printed black ink on white paper. In some cases the standard format was abandoned, for example:

- Bulletin 24 (Daniel Buren, 1970): Not really published.
- Bulletin 43 (Sol LeWitt, September 1971): Folded in 48 rectangles.
- Bulletin 62 (Alighiero Boetti, November 1972): Format 28,6 x 42 cm.
- Bulletin 68 (Douglas Huebler, August 1973): Format 29.7 x 63 cm and folded in three.
- Bulletin 75 (Daniel Buren, March 1974): Printed on vellum.
- Bulletin 96 (David Tremlett, January 1976): Format 29.5 x 21 cm.
- Bulletin 107 (Francesco Clemente, May 1978): Printed on orange paper.

The magazine was distributed free of charge to about 400 addresses (mainly of artists, galleries and curators). The remainder of each edition could be picked up at the gallery in Amsterdam. In some cases distribution (and even printing) took place in other cities:

- Bulletin 11 (Stanley Brouwn, September 1969): Distributed from Düsseldorf, as an announcement for the exhibition "Prospect 69" in Kunsthalle Düsseldorf.
- Bulletin 20 (Gilbert & George, March 1970) and 21 (Yutaka Matsuzawa, March 1970): Printed and distributed in Tokyo.
- Bulletin 56 (Jan Dibbets, June 1972): Distributed from Venice.

== Lasting influence ==
Along with the Stedelijk Museum Amsterdam and Gallery Riekje Swart, Art & Project was a centre for renewal of contemporary art in the Netherlands and in Europe from the late 1960s until its closing down in 2001. The gallery's reputation helped to establish the city of Amsterdam as "an international nexus of intense art activities" in the 1960s and 70s. Several museums and galleries have dedicated exhibitions commemorating the Art & Project legacy. In 2003/04, an exhibition on the role of Art & Project took place at the Musee d'art moderne et contemporain in Geneva. In 2009, the Museum of Modern Art in New York City organized an exhibition named "In & Out of Amsterdam" with mainly works that had been donated to the museum by Van Beijeren and Van Ravesteijn in 2007. In 2010, an international symposium took place in Wiels, a centre for contemporary art in Brussels, focusing on the role of the galleries MTL (Brussels) and Art & Project (Amsterdam).

Van Beijeren and Van Ravesteijn, during more than 30 years collecting, acquired an impressive art collection that during the 1990s and 2000s has gradually found its way to various Dutch museums, as well as New York's MoMa. Original Art & Project bulletins have become much sought-after documents. The gallery's archive, as well as the couple's personal archive, measuring 92 meters, has been donated to the Rijksdienst voor het Cultureel Erfgoed (RCE), the Dutch national heritage organisation, and will be accessible to the public from 2014 onward.

== Bibliography ==
- Anne Rorimer, New Art in the 60s and 70s: Redefining Reality, Thames & Hudson, 2001 (reprint 2004)
- Christophe Cherix, 'Greetings from Amsterdam'. In: Christophe Cherix (ed.), In & Out of Amsterdam: Travels in Conceptual Art, 1960-1976, 2009, page 13-22 (online text partly available on Google Books)
- Rini Dippel, 'Art & Project: The Early Years'. In: Christophe Cherix (ed.), In & Out of Amsterdam: Travels in Conceptual Art, 1960-1976, 2009, page 23-34 (online text partly available on Google Books)
- Lucy Lippard, Six Years: The Dematerialization of the Art Object from 1966 to 1972, 1973
- Kynaston McShine, Information, exhibition catalogue, Museum of Modern Art, 1970.
- Seth Siegelaub, July/August, exhibition catalogue, Studio International, London, 1970.
- Deborah Wye, Wendy Weitman, Eye on Europe: Prints, Books & Multiples - 1960 to Now, Museum of Modern Art, Oct. 2006
