= Jan Bernard van Heek =

Jan Bernard van Heek (18 November 1863 in Enschede – 31 January 1923 in Rutbeek) was a member of the famous Dutch textile family from Twente. Among his achievements was founding the Rijksmuseum Twenthe in Enschede, the Netherlands. Jan Bernard Van Heek donated his own private collection and the museum building to the government. This made it a national museum. The museum is still an important icon in the east of the Netherlands.

Van Heek was mostly known as a board member of Van Heek & Co as well as the Rijksmuseum Twenthe, to which he donated his art collection. He was the son of Gerrit Jan van Heek and married the American Edwina Burr Ewing. They lived together in their home, Zonnebeek, influenced by her family home back in the United States. He is buried at the Algemene Oosterbegraafplaats in Enschede.
