= Andrew Lord (artist) =

- Born: 1950 (age 75–76); Rochdale, Lancashire, England
- Education: Central School of Art and Design London, England
- Known for: Sculpture

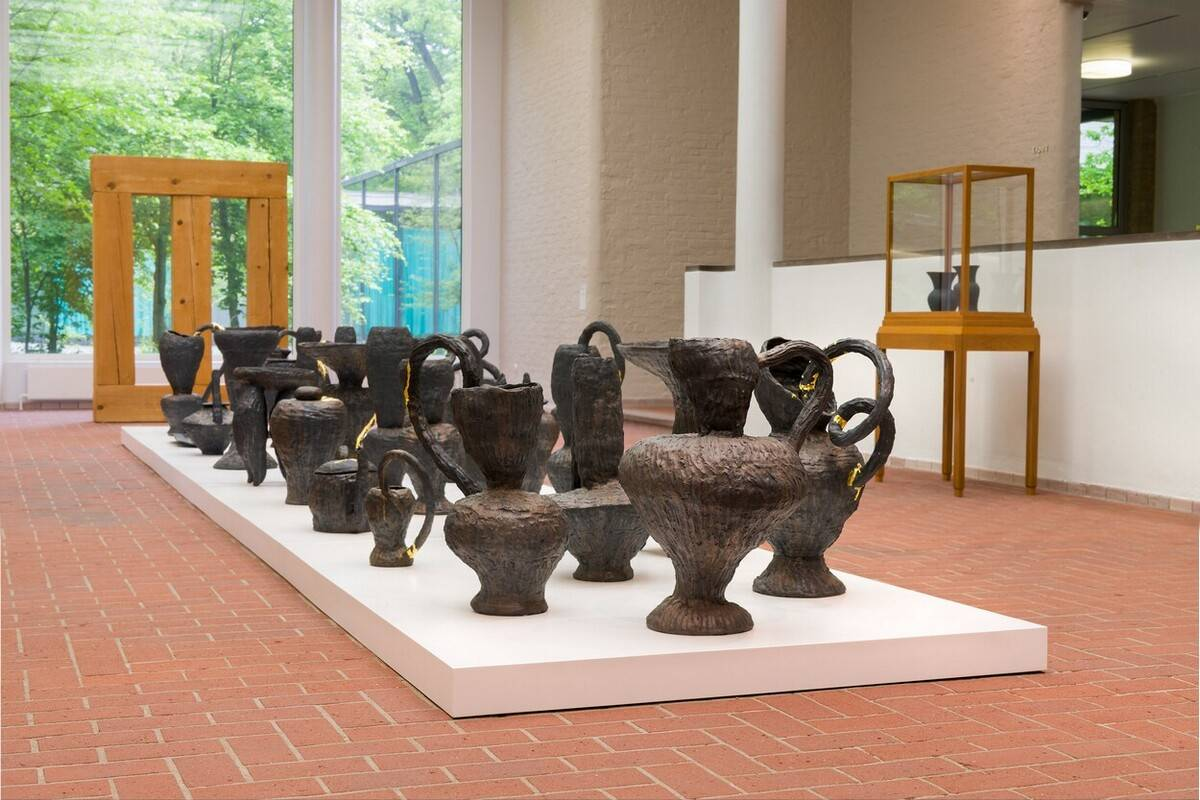
Installation view, 2019: Andrew Lord, Thirty pieces. Sorrow. (for T), 1996. Ceramic, epoxy and gold leaf, 83.7 × 800 × 140 cm. © 2019 Collection Kröller-Müller Museum, Otterlo, the Netherlands. Presented by Andrew Lord in honor of Adriaan van Ravesteijn and Geert van Beijeren. © Photography: Marjon Gemmeke

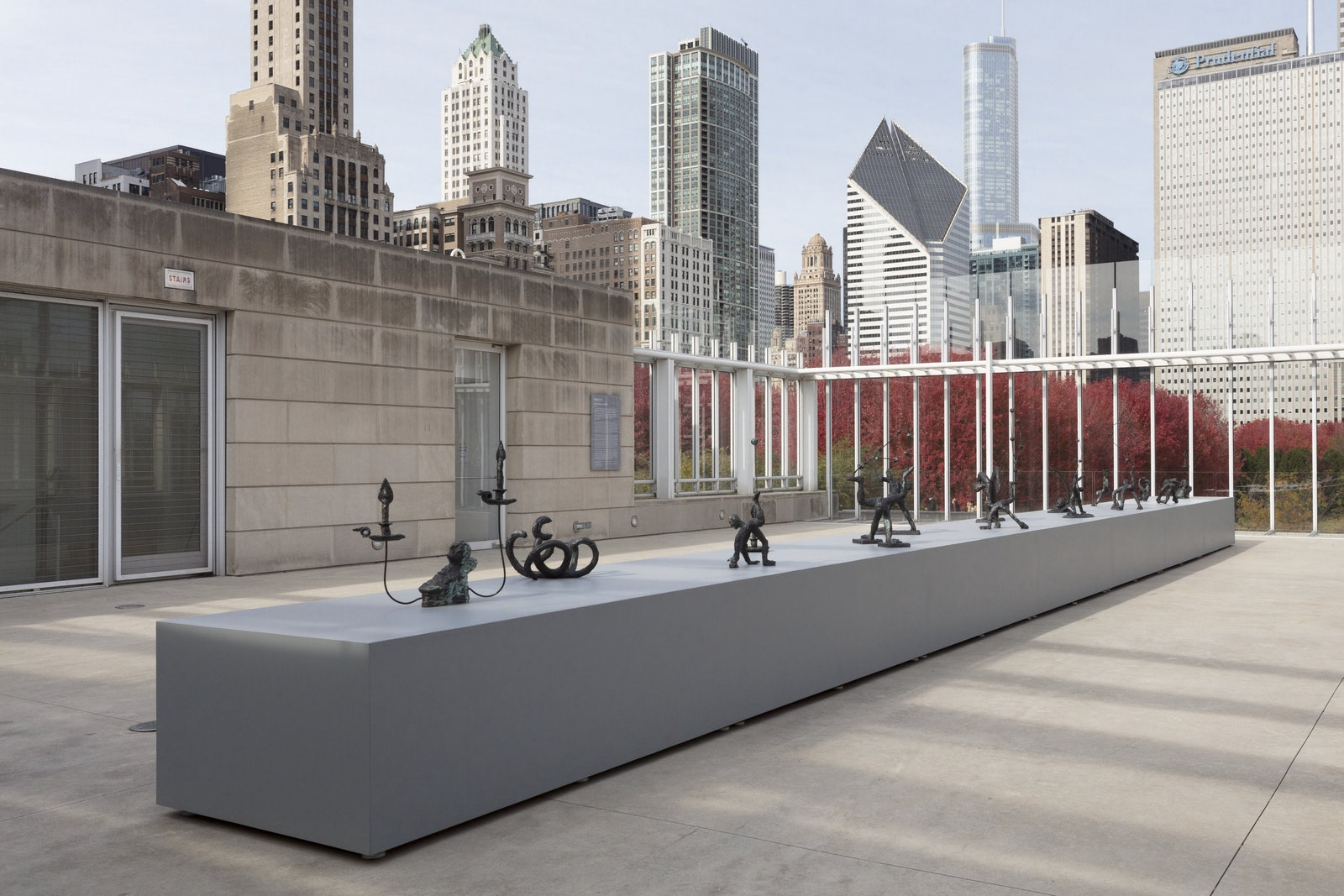
Installation view of Andrew Lord: Unslumbrous Night at the Art Institute of Chicago’s Bluhm Family Terrace, October 26, 2017–April 15, 2018. Courtesy of the Art Institute of Chicago.

Andrew Lord (born 1950) is an English artist based in New York, primarily known for ceramics and drawings. In a 2010 monograph on the occasion of his exhibition at the Milton Keynes Gallery, Dawn Adès commented that his sculpture, informed by painting, ceramics, poetry, the natural world and the city, exemplifies, "the centrality of material things to memory, experience, associations."

== Early life ==
Lord was born in Rochdale, Lancashire. He attended Rochdale College of Art and the Central School of Art and Design, London. His early influences were artists connected with the north of England; Henry Moore, the painter LS Lowry and the poet Ted Hughes, as well as the Lancashire landscape.

== Career ==
At the Central School, he encountered two influential teachers, Gilbert Harding Green and Bonnie van de Wetering. Though, it soon became clear to him that the direction of the course was not for him as Lord said, “I liked working with clay but I went through a training I didn’t like.” In 1971, upon graduating Lord exhibited his maverick approach to sculpting in clay. Throughout the 70s and 80s he explored both art historical and contemporary movements more associated with the domain of fine art such as Cubism, Process Art and Performance. In his final year at the Central School Lord travelled to Italy to study the works of the Della Robbia workshop and in 1972 he was included in the exhibition "International Ceramics" at the Victoria and Albert Museum, London. In the same year he travelled to the Netherlands to work at "de Porceleyne Fles" a ceramics factory in Delft, at first constructing large-scale sculptures in the factory's Architectural Department, later working in the Experimental Department a studio for artists within the factory. As he told curator Richard Armstrong in the catalogue to his 1993 exhibition at the Carnegie Museum of Art, “I did my own work there for six months until I was asked to leave...my work was not considered to be of a high enough standard.”

In this period he discovered the sculptors Johann Gottlieb Kirchner and Johann Joachim Kaendler of Meissen, Delft and Staffordshire ceramics and De Stijl.

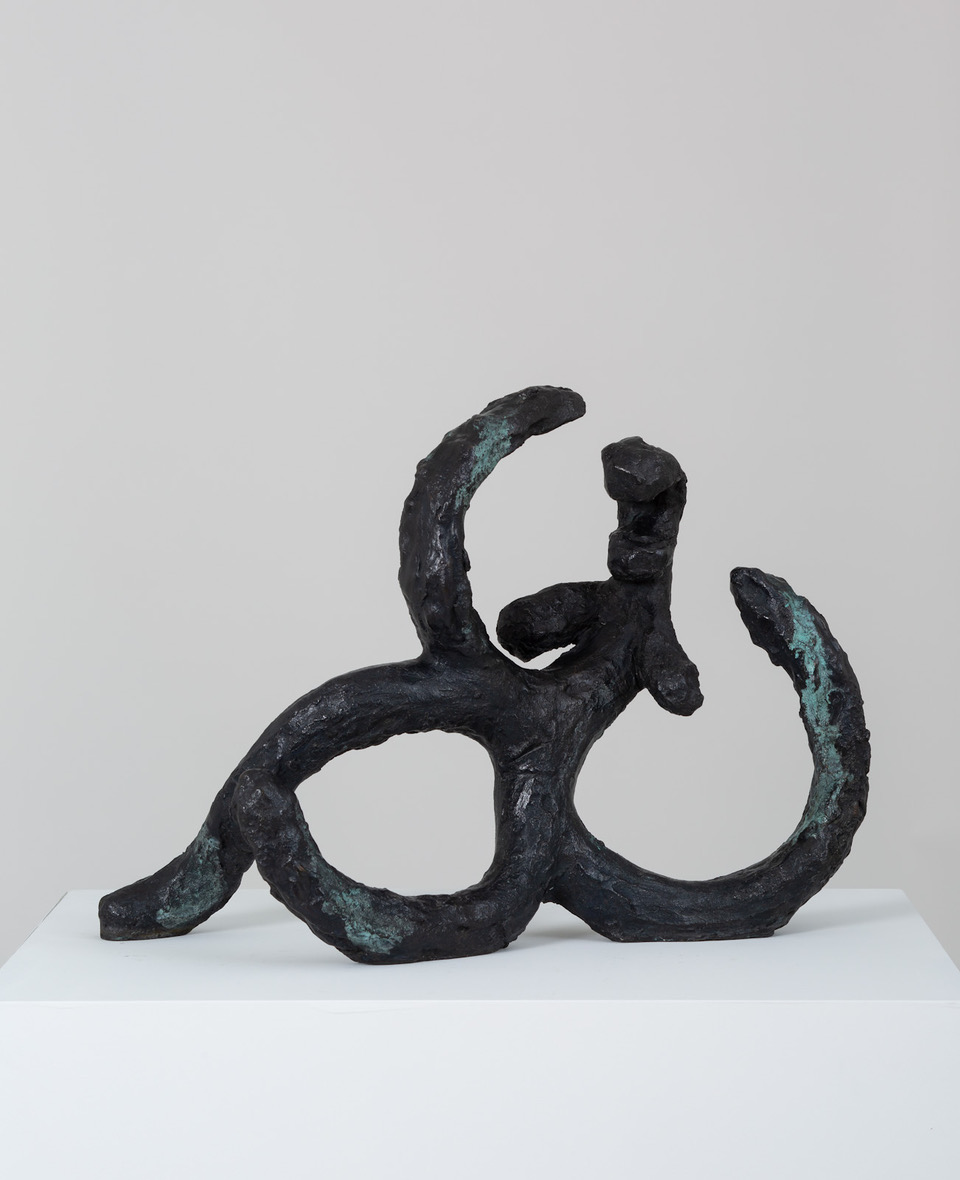
Andrew Lord, woman reclining I, 2017, Bronze, 13 x 16 1/8 x 8 3/4 inches (33 x 41 x 22.2 cm), Edition of 3 + 1AP, © Andrew Lord. Courtesy the artist and Gladstone Gallery, New York and Brussels.

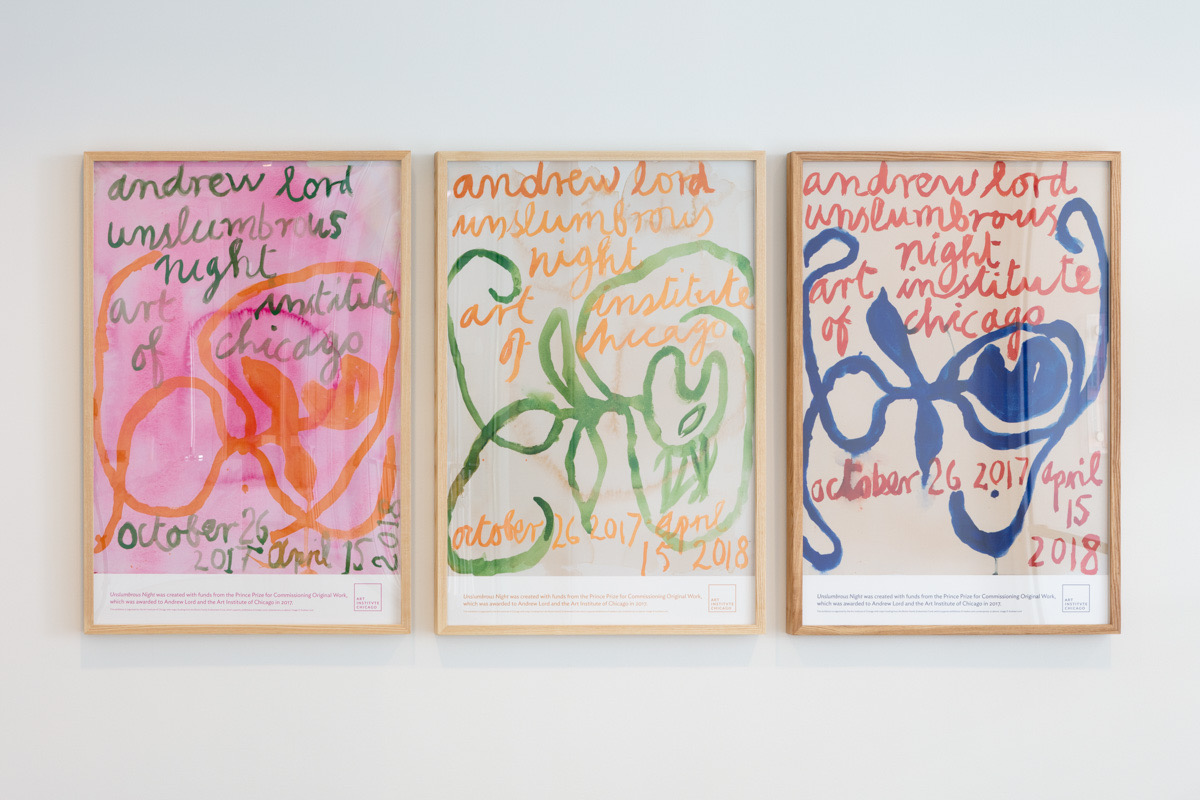
Exhibition posters for Andrew Lord: Unslumbrous Night, 2017, at the Art Institute of Chicago. © Andrew Lord. Courtesy of the Art Institute of Chicago.

As writer, artist, and authority on ceramics Tony Birks noted in 1976, Lord's distinctive approach placed him at the tense boundary of fine art and craft: “It is ironic that his carefully and deliberately made pieces are in distinguished public and private collections around the world, by way of fine art galleries, but are regarded as crude, childish or clumsy by some of the regular outlets for hand-made objects.” In 1974, with a scholarship from the British Council Lord travelled throughout Mexico looking at pre-Columbian art and architecture, attached to the Museo Nacional de Antropologia in Mexico City. In 1975 he returned to Rotterdam, where he received a three-year stipend from the Rotterdam Art Foundation. Whilst living there he travelled extensively in Europe and made frequent visits to Paris where he looked at paintings made there at the end of the nineteenth and beginning of the twentieth centuries and discovered the ceramics of Paul Gauguin. Henry Geldzahler explained Lord's vision as, "precipitated by a sudden confrontation with the history of painting and sculpture and modern art in particular." Of this time, Lord said, “I tried to understand how Picasso, Cezanne and Monet had looked at objects and how they had observed light and shade. In my studio in Rotterdam I painted the objects I was making as if through other artists eyes. When a particular kind of light fell across a plate or vase I recorded it with brushstrokes I’d seen in paintings.”

His first solo exhibition, "Pottery," was held at Anthony Stokes Gallery, London in 1978, installed on Barry Flanagan's Rowford Process furniture. Of the show, British art critic William Packer wrote, “Lord’s work is fraught with ambiguity; when does an object become still life and taking it a further step, when does still-life, that staple of painting, become sculpture?" In 1978 he exhibited at the Stedelijk Museum and began working with the leading Dutch art gallery, Art & Project making his second solo exhibition "Angled Pottery" with the gallery in 1980.

In 1981, Kasper Koenig included him in the exhibition, "Heute-Westkunst," at Museen der Stadt Koln, Rheinhalle in Cologne after which he left Amsterdam for New York. Lord's work was introduced to New York in 1981 by Irving Blum and Joseph Helman, at the Blum Helman Gallery. In the New York Times John Russell called his US debut, “The most original show of the month, and the most difficult to categorize ... before long we realise that they may not really be sculptures at all, but paintings that happen to be performed as much as painted, in three dimensions. His pieces are sculpture in that we can walk all around them, but fundamentally they are paintings.” Reviewing his 2009 exhibition, Robert Pincus-Witten wrote, “His radical relocation of crafts to art means we now must judge his work as we do painting and sculpture.” In a review in the New York Times of his 2014 exhibition at Gladstone Gallery, Ken Johnson wrote, “At once bracingly ugly and sensuously beautiful, the recent ceramic sculpture by the British artist Andrew Lord look as if they’d been made by a clumsy but aesthetically sensitive giant. Contemporary clay sculpture doesn’t get much better than this.”

== Influence ==
In 2002 Adriaan van Ravesteijn, collector gallerist of Amsterdam's Art & Project, used an allegory of a sea of sculptors' to describe Lord's unique approach:

“We would have to look for him at the outer limits of the convoy, far from other artists, amid a wide expanse of sea. Along the flank of this ship we can still see clear signs of damage from a collision that he once had with another ship. Many years ago, ceramists sailing the waters of the applied arts had tried to abduct him to their own camp. Unfortunately for them, but not for us, the attempt failed, so that Andrew Lord was able to dedicate himself to sculpture, an art form which he has now enriched with a completely unique artistic language”

Described as an "artist's artist" by Jerry Saltz, Lord's work from the 1970s onwards was collected primarily by fellow artists including Barry Flanagan, David Hockney, Jasper Johns, Ellsworth Kelly, Mark Lancaster, Roy Lichtenstein, Peter Struycken, Cy Twombly and Ugo Rondinone.

Ceramics historian Garth Clark described Lord as ‘a style’s originator’. In 2015 he wrote, “There is something of an irony about the work in Andrew Lord’s new exhibition at Barbara Gladstone Gallery...Lord has always been unique, a loner. His approach to clay gives an aura of craftlessness...the seeming casualness with which he moves the clay and the “sloppy” glazing has irked the ceramics community for five decades while at the same time intriguing the art world. However, now his “look” is everywhere, Lord Pots and Lord Sculptures abound throughout New York and beyond...For the first time Lord is now competing in a genre he pioneered and in many ways founded.”

Describing Simon de Pury’s 2015 exhibition ‘Fire’ at Venus over Manhattan Gallery, Ian Volner wrote, ‘The medium first caught Simon’s attention in the mid-1990s, when he happened on a show by Lord, a New York–based ceramicist, at the Leo Castelli Gallery. Lord’s expressive, unconventional handling of the material made a lasting impression not just on de Pury, but also on a generation of artists who have taken up ceramics in the years since. “He’s been very influential,” says the curator, who managed to draw together Lord and some of the artists the ceramicist has inspired for the Venus Over Manhattan show.’
