= Voorschoten =

- Town and Municipality
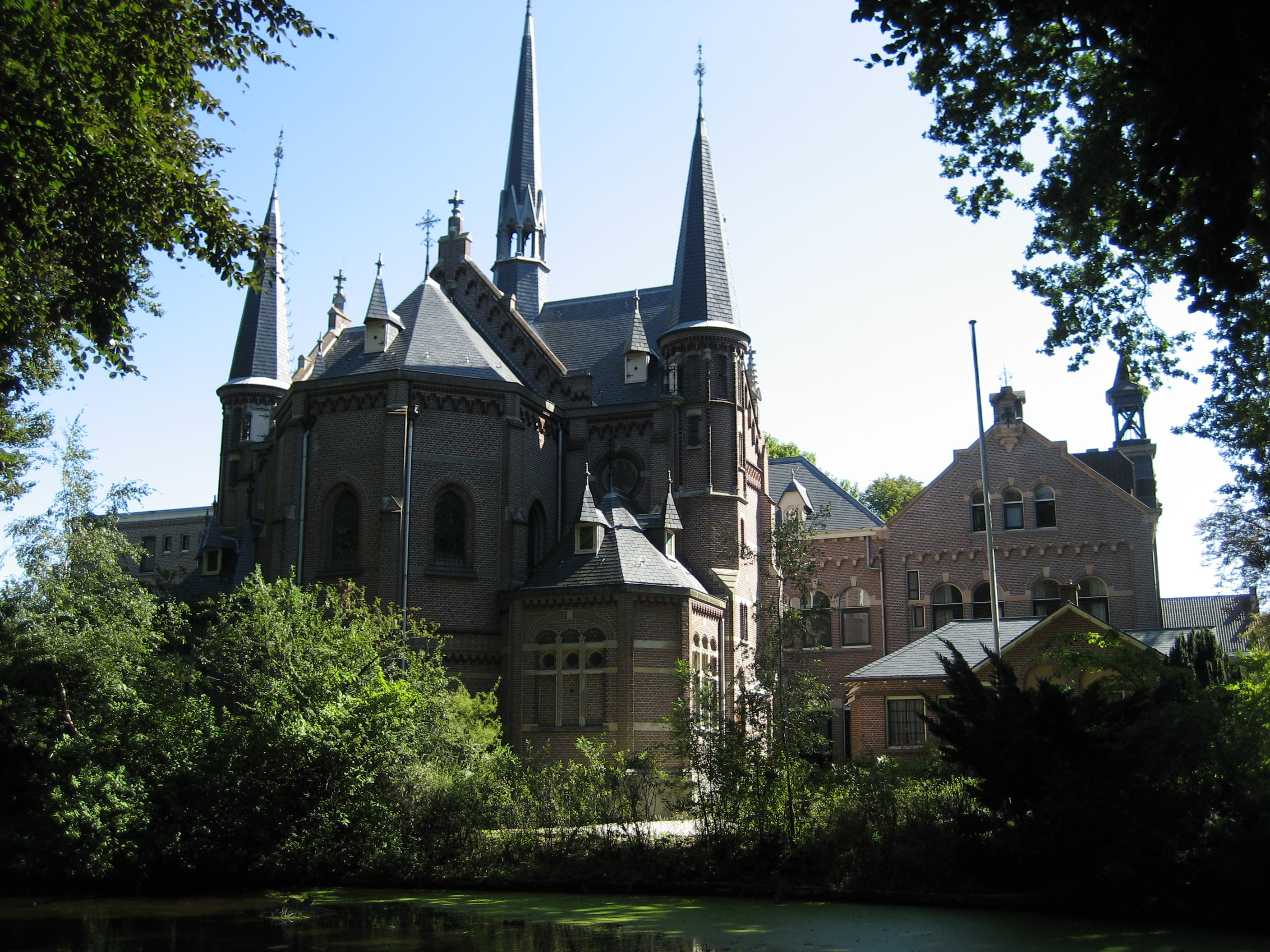
- Kloosterkapel in Voorschoten

- Flag Coat of arms

- Location in South Holland
- Coordinates: 52°8′N 4°27′E
- Country: Netherlands
- Province: South Holland

Government
  - Body: Municipal council
  - Mayor: Nadine Stemerdink (VVD)

Area
  - Total: 11.56 km^{2} (4.46 sq mi)
  - Land: 11.14 km^{2} (4.30 sq mi)
  - Water: 0.42 km^{2} (0.16 sq mi)
- Elevation: 0 m (0 ft)

Population (January 2021)
  - Total: 25,650
  - Density: 2,303/km^{2} (5,960/sq mi)
- Demonym: Voorschotenaar
- Time zone: UTC+1 (CET)
  - Summer (DST): UTC+2 (CEST)
- Postcode: 2250–2254
- Area code: 071
- Website: www.voorschoten.nl

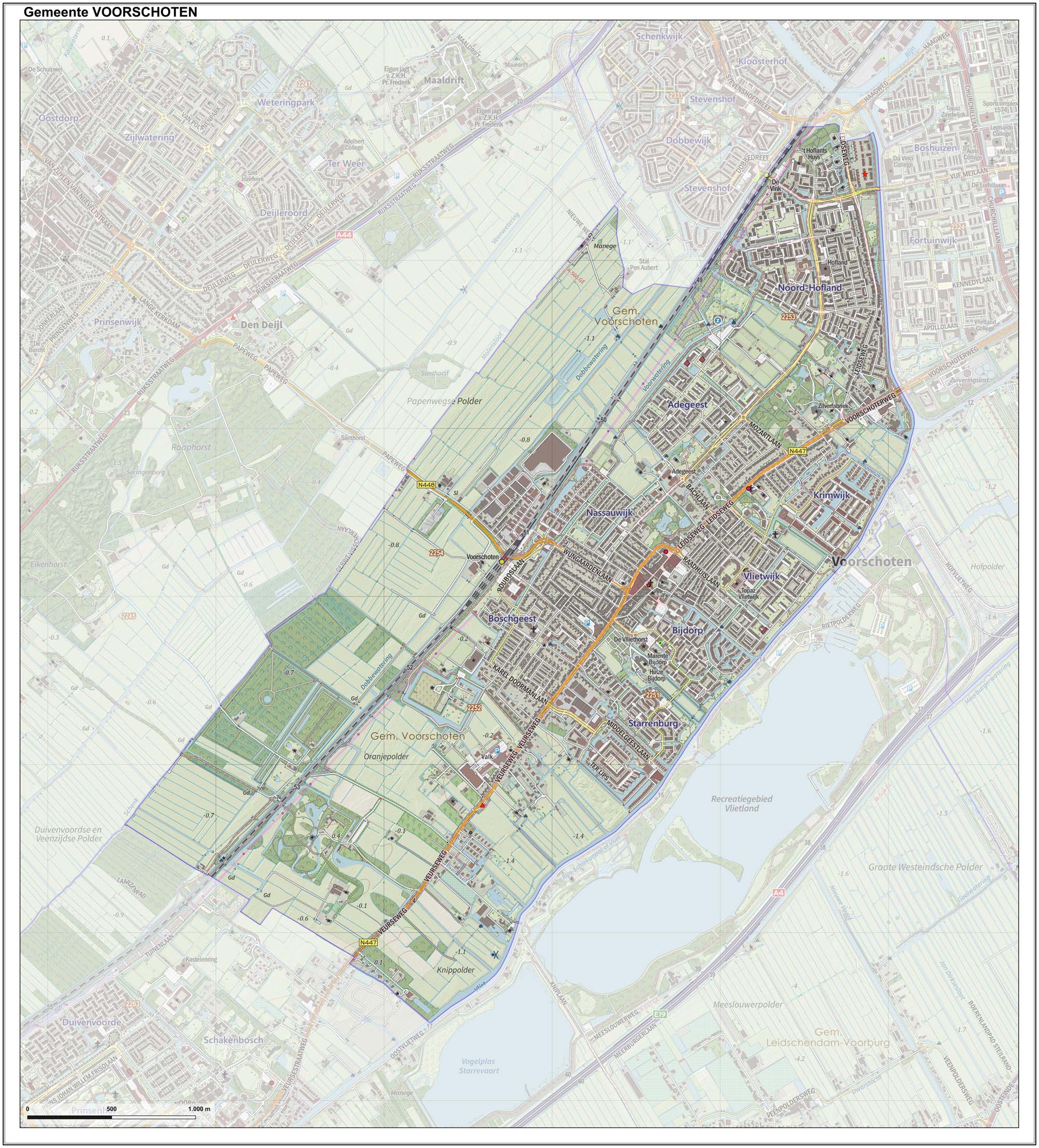
Map of the municipality of Voorschoten, June 2015

Voorschoten (Dutch pronunciation: [ˈvoːrsxoːtə(n)]) is a town and municipality in the western Netherlands, in the province of South Holland. It is a smaller town in the Randstad, enclosed by the cities of Leiden, Wassenaar and Leidschendam-Voorburg. The municipality covers an area of 11.56 km^{2} (4.46 sq mi) of which 0.42 km^{2} (0.16 sq mi) is covered by water.

The town is relatively affluent, and the majority of Voorschoten's population are commuters, generally to either the Hague or Leiden. Despite the fact that it is situated in one of the most densely populated areas in the Netherlands, and, indeed, the world, the town retains a strong, independent identity and village-like atmosphere. Several buildings of historical importance are situated in Voorschoten. For example, the old Castle Duivenvoorde, and the Manor Vredenhof – rebuilt by Dirck Jansz Graeff, and until the 18th century in the hands of the De Graeff family – are located in or near Voorschoten.

The town's proximity to the Hague, as well as the presence of the British School in the Netherlands in the town, and the American School of the Hague in nearby Wassenaar, means that Voorschoten has a large community of expatriates, particularly British nationals.

Floris V of Holland granted Voorschoten market rights in 1282.

In recent years, the settlement has seen considerable expansion, with the addition of several new areas of housing, such as Starrenburg, Krimwijk II and, most recently, Voorsche Park. The town benefits from excellent sporting and recreational facilities, including hockey, football and baseball clubs, a tennis club, a swimming pool and a golf course. There are a number of churches located throughout the town, the two most striking of which are the main church, located in Voorschoten's historic centre, and the St. Laurentius Church, located in the north of the town.

== Local government ==
The municipal council of Voorschoten consists of 21 seats, which divided as follows at the 2026 election:

- GroenLinks/PvdA, 5 seats
- VVD, 5 seats
- Voorschoten Lokaal, 3 seats
- D66, 3 seats
- CDA, 2 seats
- FvD, 2 seats
- SP, 1 seat

== Public transportation ==
Voorschoten railway station is situated on the Amsterdam–Haarlem–Rotterdam railway and trains run regularly toward The Hague and Amsterdam.

On 4 April 2023, the Voorschoten train crash occurred near to the railway station.

== Notable people ==
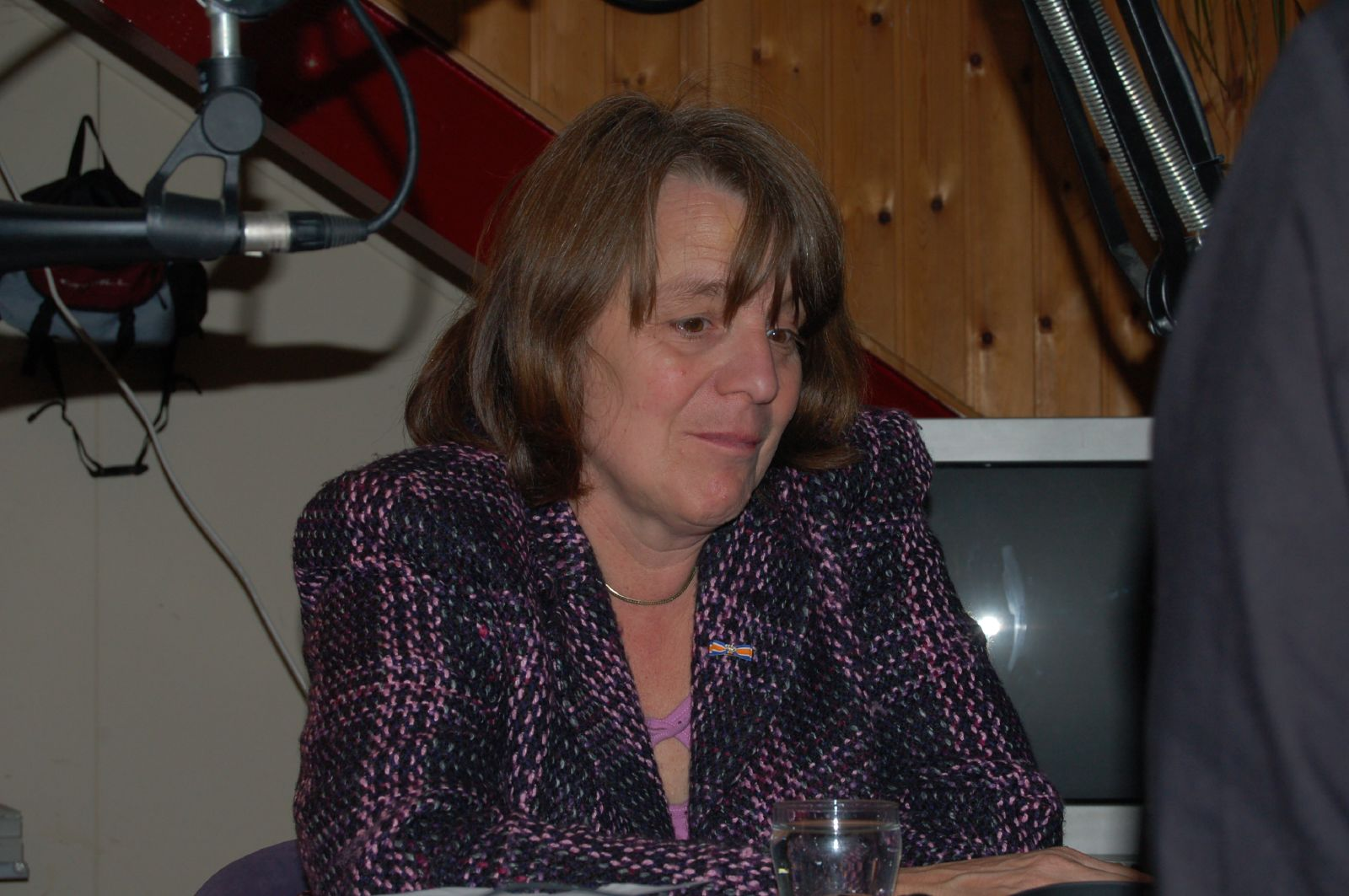
Helma Nepperus, 2006

- Melchior Treub (1851–1910) a botanist, founded the Bogor Agricultural Institute
- Lodewijk Thomson (1869–1914) a Dutch military commander and politician
- Max van der Stoel (1924–2011) a politician, diplomat and jurist
- Piet Bukman (1934–2022) a politician, diplomat and economist
- Benk Korthals (born 1944) a retired politician and jurist
- Helma Neppérus (born 1950) a politician, former tax inspector, rower and Voorschoten municipal councillor
- Henk A. M. J. ten Have (born 1951) a professor of healthcare ethics
- Han Schuil (born 1958) a multimedia artist
- Hans Vijlbrief (born 1963) a civil servant, economist, and State Secretary for Finance
- Rolf Muntz (born 1969) a professional golfer

== Gallery ==
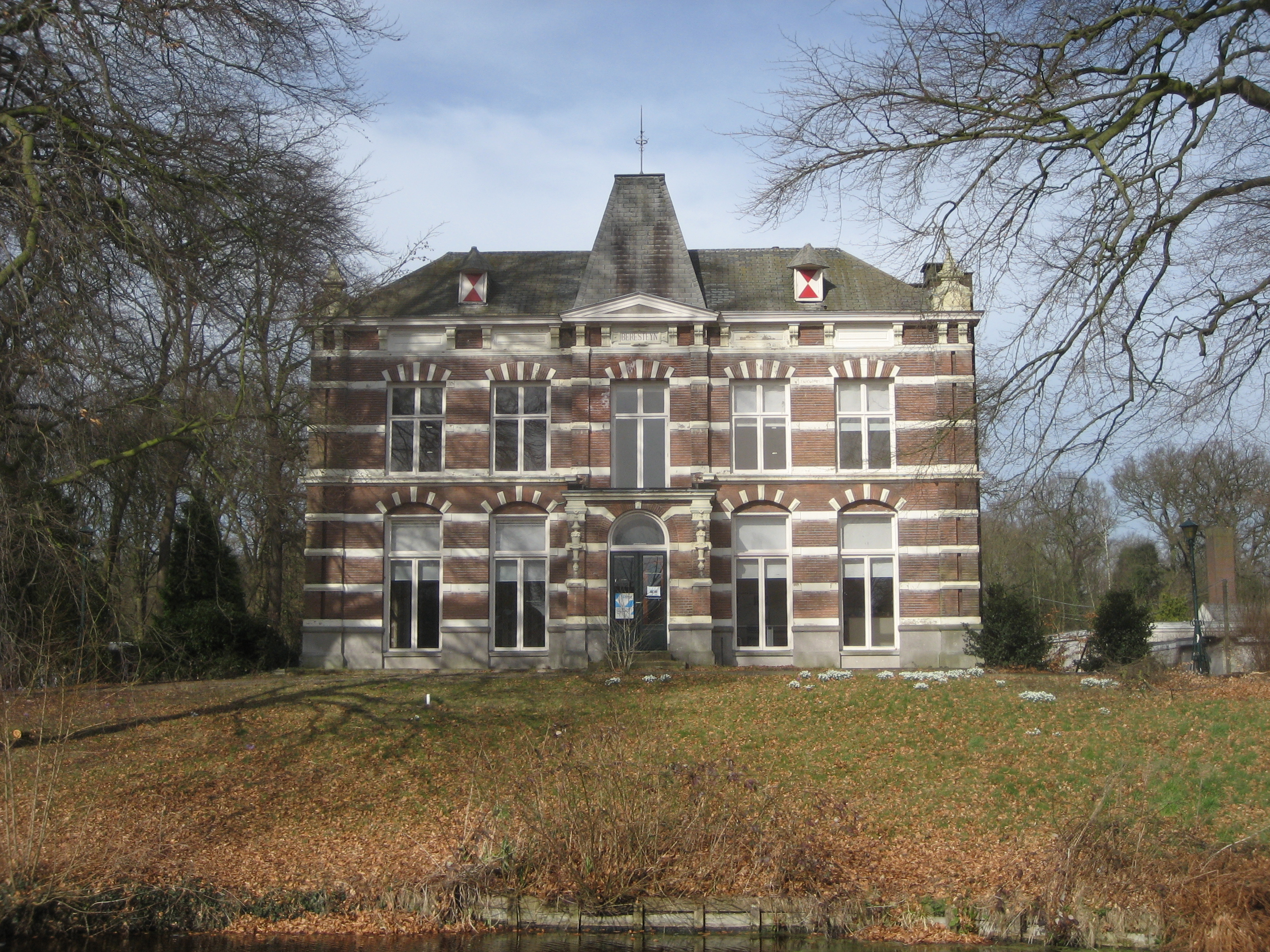
Voorschoten, Buitenplaats Beresteijn

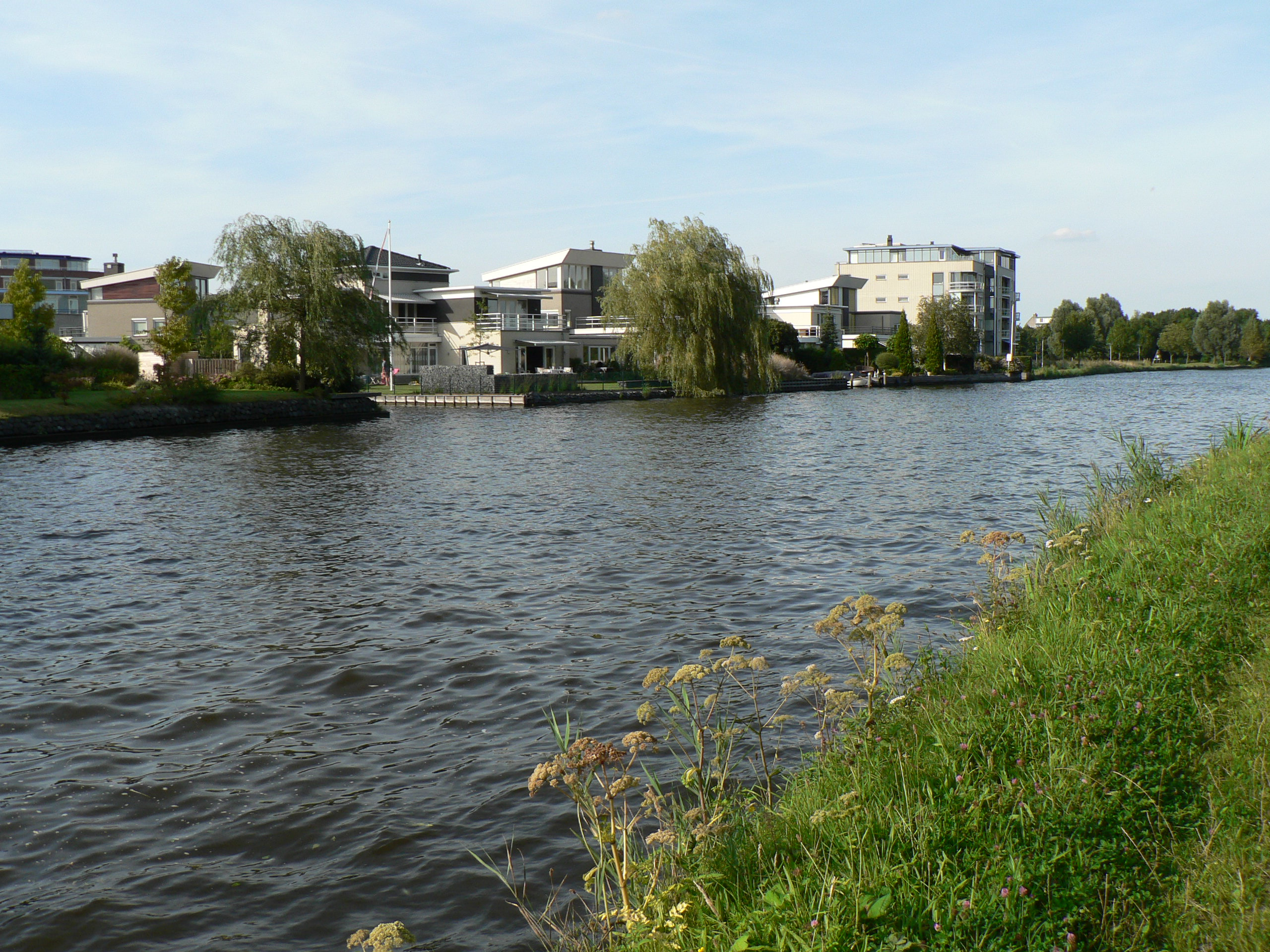
Voorschoten Starrenburg

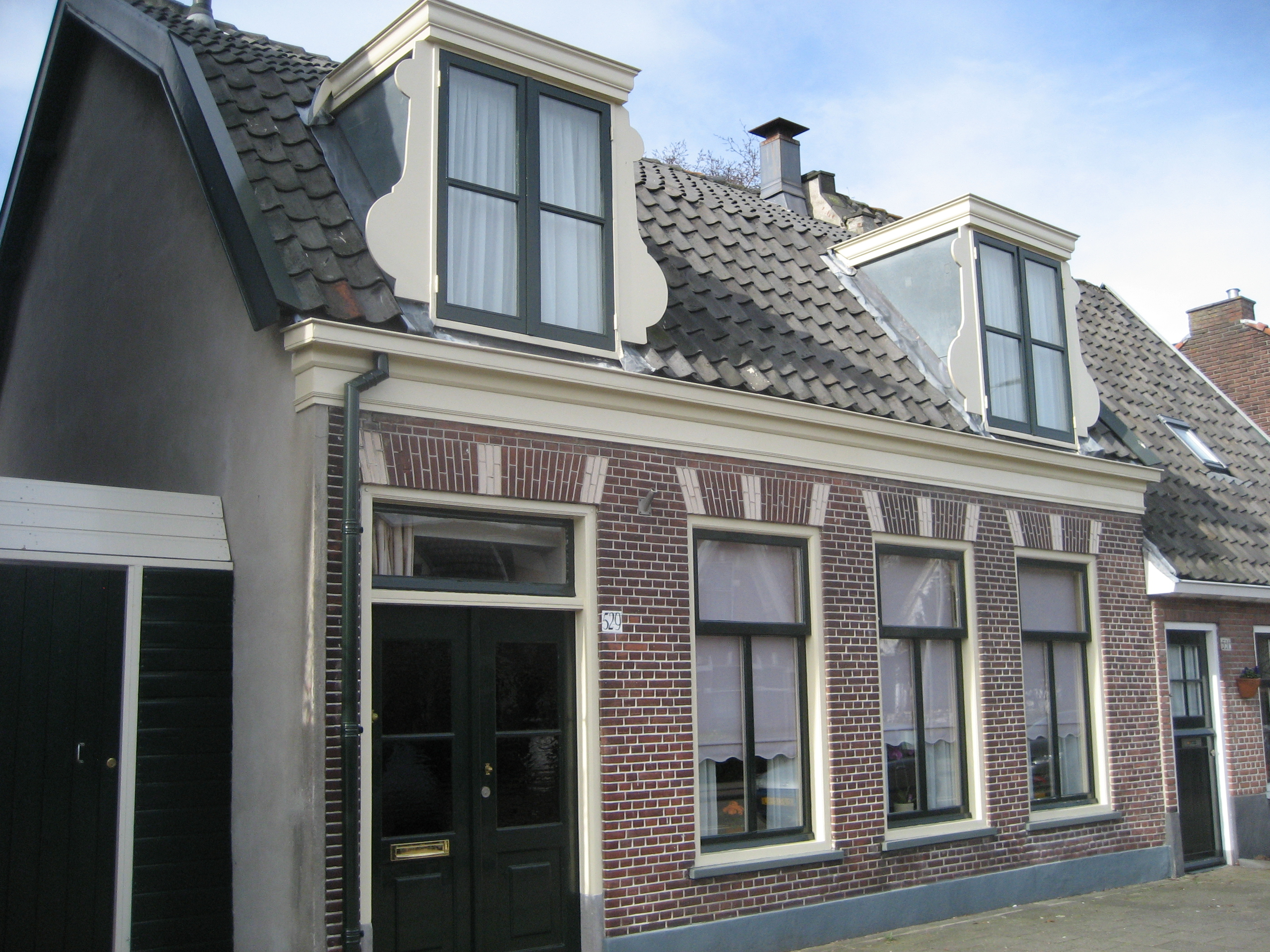
Voorschoten, Leidseweg

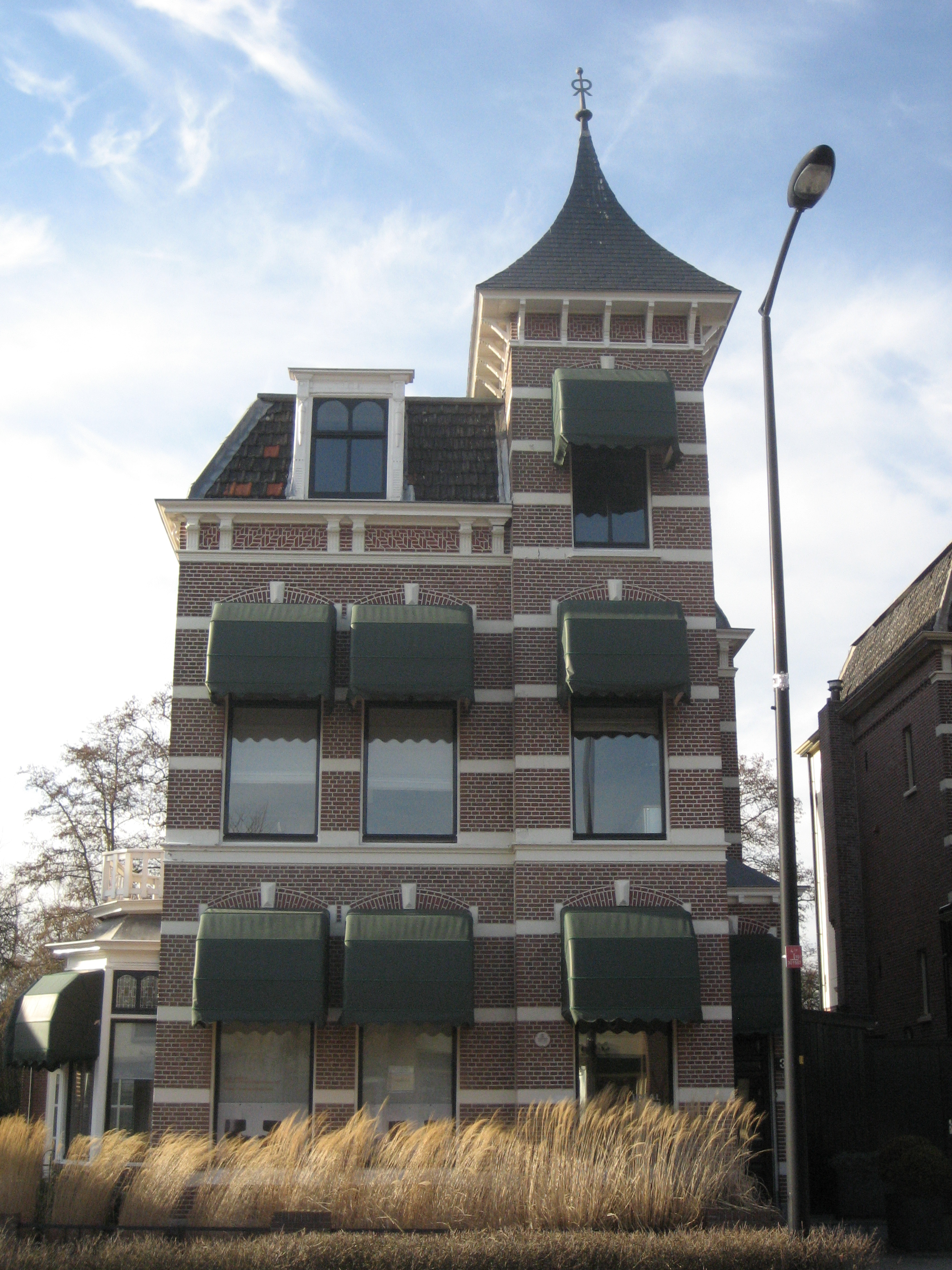
Voorschoten, Leidseweg

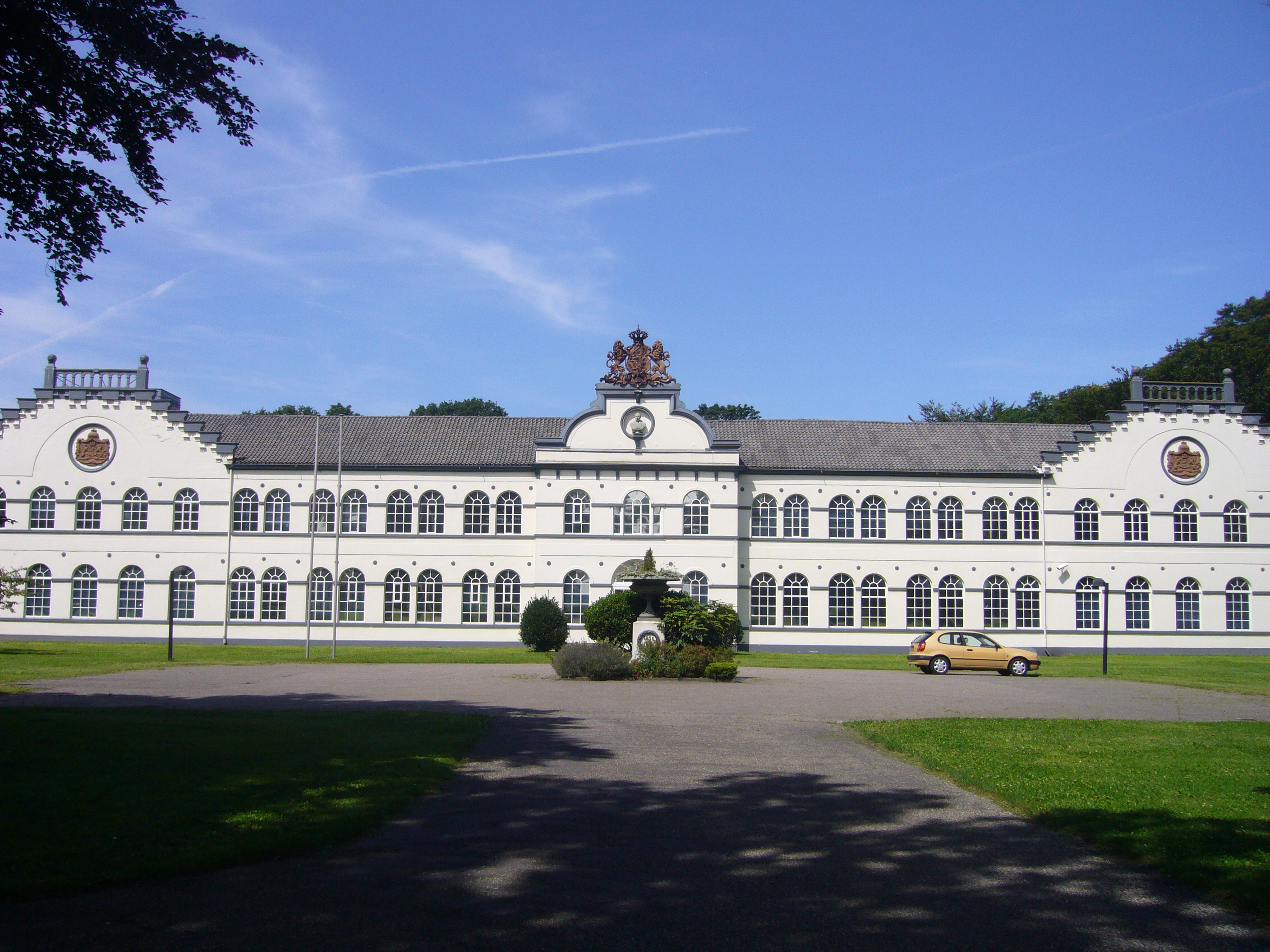
Van Kempen, Voorschoten

== Climate ==
Climate data for Voorschoten (1991−2020 normals, extremes 2014−present)
Month	Jan	Feb	Mar	Apr	May	Jun	Jul	Aug	Sep	Oct	Nov	Dec	Year
Record high °C (°F)	13.9 (57.0)	18.4 (65.1)	21.9 (71.4)	26.6 (79.9)	30.5 (86.9)	32.8 (91.0)	35.5 (95.9)	33.4 (92.1)	30.8 (87.4)	25.1 (77.2)	18.5 (65.3)	15.0 (59.0)	35.5 (95.9)
Mean daily maximum °C (°F)	6.4 (43.5)	6.9 (44.4)	9.8 (49.6)	13.6 (56.5)	17.0 (62.6)	19.6 (67.3)	21.6 (70.9)	21.8 (71.2)	18.9 (66.0)	14.7 (58.5)	10.2 (50.4)	7.1 (44.8)	14.0 (57.2)
Daily mean °C (°F)	4.1 (39.4)	4.2 (39.6)	6.4 (43.5)	9.4 (48.9)	12.8 (55.0)	15.6 (60.1)	17.8 (64.0)	17.8 (64.0)	15.0 (59.0)	11.4 (52.5)	7.6 (45.7)	4.8 (40.6)	10.6 (51.1)
Mean daily minimum °C (°F)	1.5 (34.7)	1.2 (34.2)	2.7 (36.9)	4.8 (40.6)	8.3 (46.9)	11.2 (52.2)	13.5 (56.3)	13.4 (56.1)	10.9 (51.6)	7.9 (46.2)	4.7 (40.5)	2.1 (35.8)	6.8 (44.2)
Record low °C (°F)	−8.0 (17.6)	−11.0 (12.2)	−8.2 (17.2)	−4.8 (23.4)	−0.6 (30.9)	4.9 (40.8)	6.9 (44.4)	5.6 (42.1)	1.9 (35.4)	−0.3 (31.5)	−7.0 (19.4)	−5.1 (22.8)	−11.0 (12.2)
Average precipitation mm (inches)	70.0 (2.76)	59.4 (2.34)	52.8 (2.08)	41.6 (1.64)	52.7 (2.07)	62.8 (2.47)	—	—	—	91.1 (3.59)	89.2 (3.51)	83.7 (3.30)	—
Average relative humidity (%)	86.4	84.3	81.9	78.3	77.4	78.6	79.5	80.1	82.5	84.1	87.0	87.2	82.3
Mean monthly sunshine hours	71.7	96.7	152.0	207.2	240.5	229.3	237.5	213.4	160.0	116.7	68.2	56.5	1,849.7
Percentage possible sunshine	27.7	34.4	41.2	49.7	49.5	45.9	47.3	46.9	41.9	35.2	25.6	23.3	39.0
Source: Royal Netherlands Meteorological Institute
