= Nicholas Pope (artist) =

British and Australian artist (1949–2026)

Nicholas Pope (26 February 1949 – 23 March 2026) was a British and Australian artist. He studied at the Bath Academy of Art (1970–73). In 1974, he was granted a Romanian Government Exchange Scholarship and in 1976 the Calouste Gulbenkian Foundation Award.

== Life and career ==
Pope was born in Sydney on 26 February 1949. His work from the 1970s has a powerful abstract quality that is softened by his use of natural materials, chalk and wood. His most important early shows included solo exhibitions at the Garage Gallery in London (1976), the Anthony Stokes Gallery (1979), and the Art & Project Gallery in Amsterdam (1979). In 1980, Pope represented Britain at the XXXIX Venice Biennale, and in 1981, he traveled to Zimbabwe as a British Council Cultural Visitor.

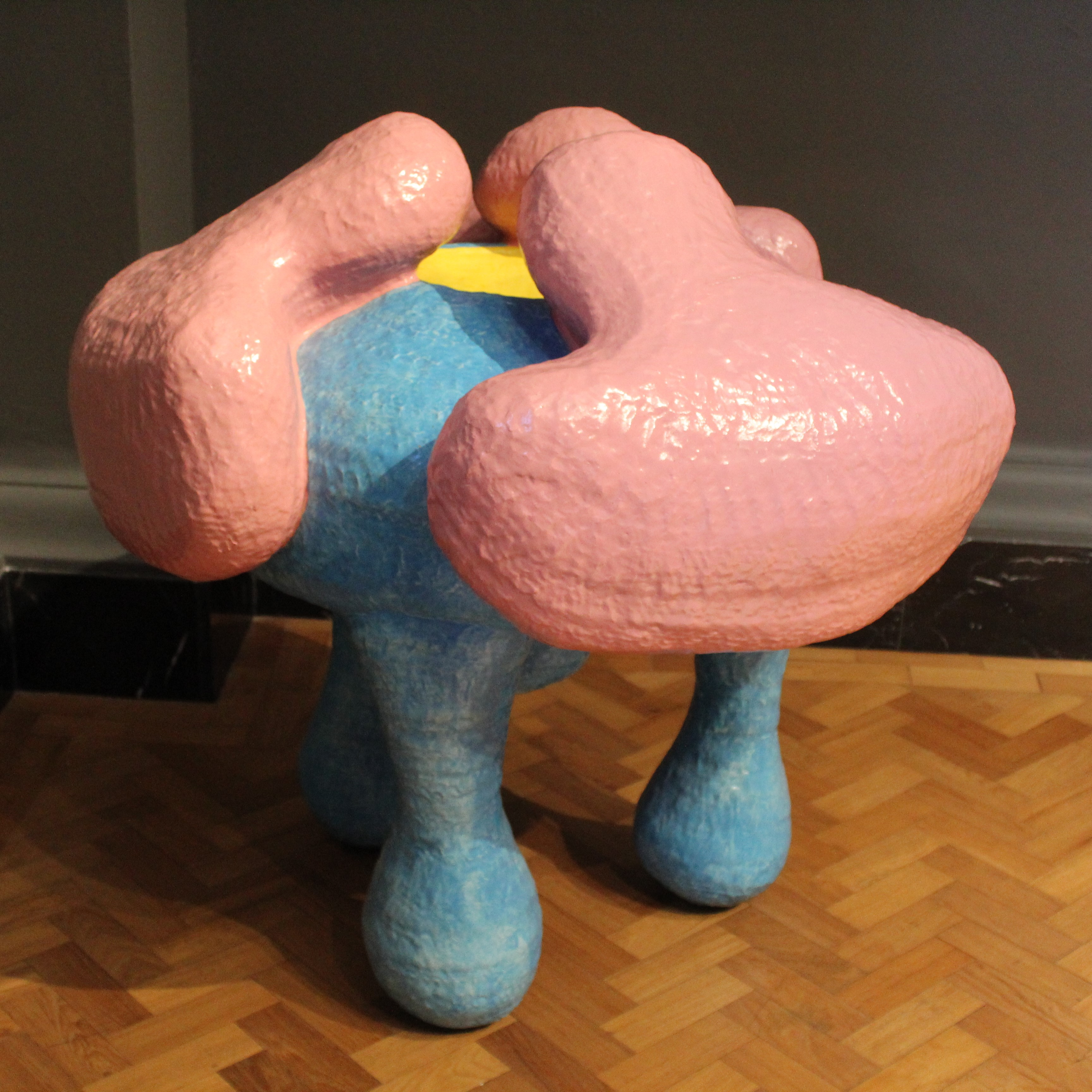
Hermaphroditic Font by Nicholas Pope, Victoria and Albert Museum, London

In 1982, Pope contracted a rare form of encephalitic virus after a visit to Tanzania. It went undiagnosed for several years and his work was impaired due to a degree of permanent brain damage being inflicted. In 1987, Pope withdrew from the art world and abandoned his studio work. This period of inactivity continued until 1992, after which he recuperated and elected to make religion and Christianity a strong theme in his work.

The first comprehensive monograph of Pope's work was published by Ridinghouse in 2013. This title features sculptures and drawings by Pope from the 1970s to present, along with texts by Tate Britain Director Penelope Curtis, Christopher Townsend and Andrew Sabin.

He lived and worked in Herefordshire. His work is included in many museum collection in Australia, the United Kingdom and the Netherlands. Pope's work is represented by The Sunday Painter, London.

Pope died in Much Marcle on 23 March 2026, at the age of 77.
