= Han Schuil =

Dutch multimedia artist (born 1958)

- Born: February 12, 1958 (age 68); Voorschoten, Netherlands
- Education: Willem de Kooning Academy, Ateliers '63
- Known for: Multimedia art
- Style: Abstract art

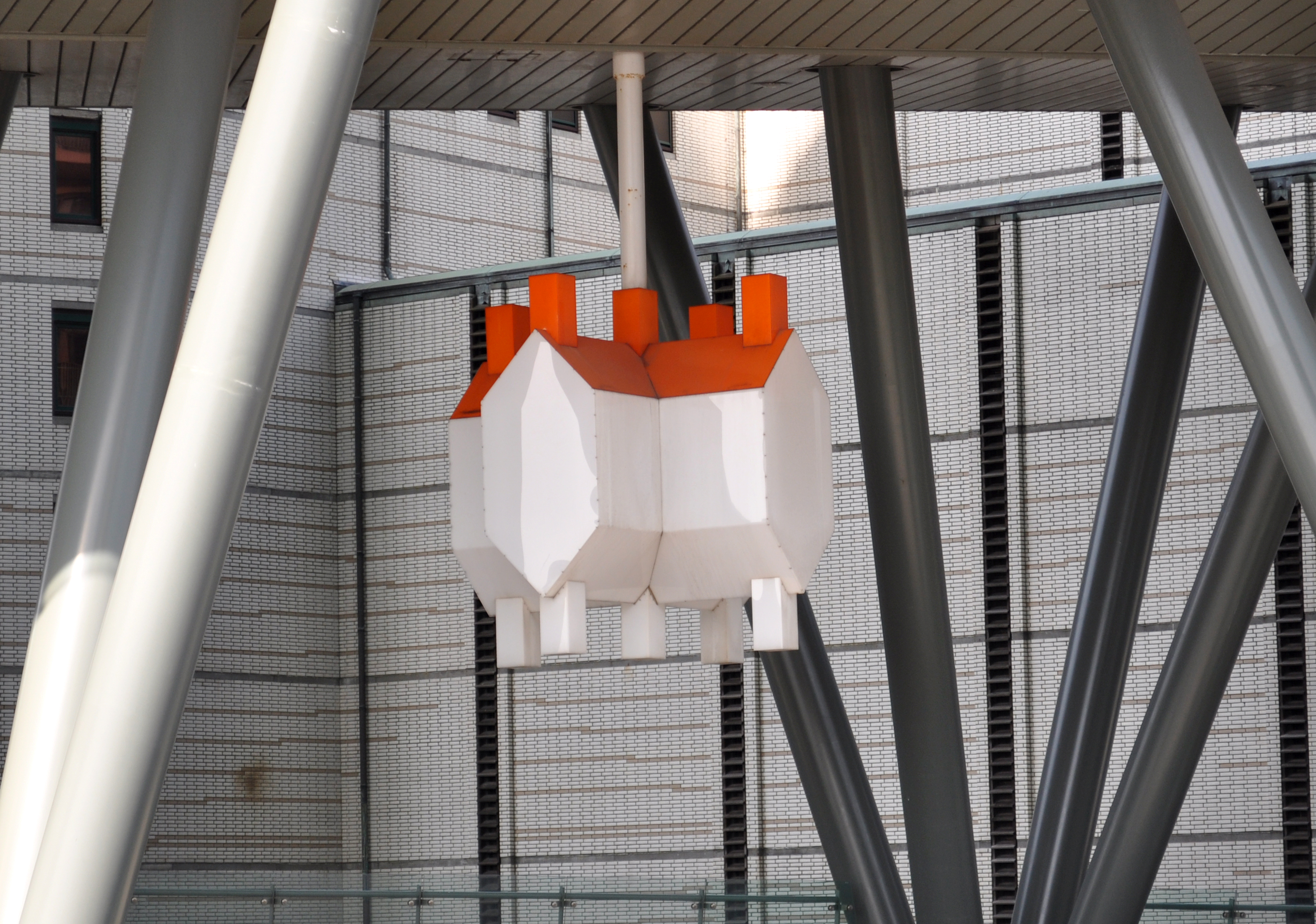
Sculpture (one of two) hanging below the apartment building "La Fenêtre" at the Prins Willem Alexanderweg in The Hague, made by Han Schuil in 2005

Han Schuil (born 12 February 1958, Voorschoten) is a Dutch multimedia artist, who works in a Dutch tradition of compactness and tension in painting.

== Biography ==
From 1979 to 1981 Schuil attended the Academie voor Beeldende Kunsten in Rotterdam, the predecessor of the Willem de Kooning Academy. He went on from there to Ateliers '63, a postgraduate program in Haarlem, where he worked from 1981 to 1983. He made his debut in 1983 at the gallery Art & Project.

In his early career, Schuil worked on canvas. After experimenting with wood, aluminium, and copper, he has opted for aluminium since 1985, because it provides a smooth surface for painting. The shapes formed by aluminium often play a central role in Schuil’s work. Examples include the folded edges and the seams and rivets in the aluminium, which sometimes run straight through the picture plane.

Over time, Schuil has also shown a growing tendency to have the support protrude into three-dimensional space. Schuil frequently treats the aluminium before painting it, making dents and holes that become integral parts of the picture. “I use them not to emphasize the thingness of the picture, but because they fit into the picture,” Schuil told Dominic van den Boogerd in 2000.

In the mid-1990s, Schuil’s work became more complex. By mirroring, doubling, and combining motifs, he fashioned increasingly elaborate and baroque compositions. In addition to creating these intricate works, he has also continued to draw on the plainer pictorial language of his early years.

== Work ==
The origins of Schuil’s artistic themes lie in everyday reality and range from comic strips, video games, and computer graphics to road markings, a skating suit, an infrared photograph, and an MRI scan. Writer and curator Lynne Cooke described how these motives relate to Schuils work.

“The particular object which struck Schuil forcibly enough to provide the genesis for this images is, as so often in his work, not readily or precisely identifiable, though its very mundanity invests the resulting work with what might be deemed the visual counterpart to that feeling of having something on the tip of one’s tongue - something at the corner of one’s eye? -, the reverberation of something well-known that nevertheless eludes identification, that resists naming. Displaced metaphors, elusive visual memories, connotations conjured the countered or otherwise undermined, the depicted and the actual held in ambivalent equivocation: these are some of the principal means by which Han Schuil affirms the inclusive and contemporary nature of abstract art, while at the same time respecting the logic of pictorial coherence and objecthood as prescribed by a formalist aesthetic”

According to Bert Jansen "the meaning they have in the real life is lost as soon as the feature as signs in a Han Schuil Painting." Rudi Fuchs, former director of the Stedelijk Museum in Amsterdam placed Schuil in a Dutch tradition of compactness and tension in painting.

== Exhibitions ==
Solo (selection)

- 1983–1996: Art & Project, Amsterdam, the Netherlands
- 1985: Galerie 't Venster, Rotterdam, The Netherlands
- 1987: Museum Fodor, Amsterdam, the Netherlands
- 1990: 1991 Germans van Eck Gallery, New York, USA
- 1995: until now Galerie Onrust, Amsterdam, the Netherlands
- 2000: Schilderijen / Paintings1983-1999, Stedelijk Museum Amsterdam, The Netherlands
- 2000: 2004 Gallery Conrads, Düsseldorf, Germany
- 2008: Crashed and Gobsmacked, Museum Jan Cunen, Oss, The Netherlands
- 2011, 2013: Gallery Hamish Morrison, Berlin, Germany

Group Exhibition

- 1985: 'Wat Amsterdam betreft', Stedelijk Museum Amsterdam, The Netherlands
- 1987: 'XIX Bienal de São Paulo', São Paulo, Brazil
- 1991: 'Negen', Witte de With, Rotterdam, The Netherlands
- 1992: 'Moments d'abstraccio', Palau de la Virreina, Barcelona, Spain
- 1994: 'L'orrizonte', Castello di Rivoli, Turin, Italy
- 1995: 'Couplet 4', Stedelijk Museum Amsterdam, The Netherlands
- 1999: 'Panorama 2000', Centraal Museum, Utrecht, The Netherlands
- 1999: 'Troublespot Painting', MUHKA, Antwerp, Belgium
- 2004: 'Encounter with Modernism', Shanghai Art Museum, Singapore Art Museum, Pinacoteca do Estado de São Paulo en Museu de Arte Moderna do Rio de Janeiro
- 2005: 'Later on we shall simplify things', Centre Cultural, Andratx, Mallorca, Stadsgalerij Heerlen, The Netherlands
- 2009: 'Real/Painting', S.M.A.K., Ghent, Belgium
- 2013: 'Van Dumas tot Cobra, Collectie De Heus-Zomer', Singer Museum, Laren, The Netherlands

== Collections ==
Work by the artist is held in various public and private collections

- Stedelijk Museum, Amsterdam, the Netherlands
- Museum Boijmans van Beuningen, Rotterdam, The Netherlands
- Gemeentemuseum Den Haag, The Hague, The Netherlands
- Bonnefantenmuseum, Maastricht, The Netherlands
- Lakenhal, Leiden, The Netherlands
- Museum Jan Cunen, Oss, The Netherlands
- Centraal Museum, Utrecht, The Netherlands
- Stedelijk Museum Schiedam, Schiedam, The Netherlands
- Rijksmuseum Twente, Enschede, The Netherlands
- Museum voor Moderne Kunst, Brussels, Belgium
- S.M.A.K., Ghent, Belgium
- Boston Museum of Fine Arts, Boston, USA
- Collection KPN, The Hague, The Netherlands
- Instituut Collectie Nederland, The Netherlands
- Collection Jo en Marlies Eyck, The Netherlands
- Collection ABN/Amro, The Netherlands
- Collection AEGON, The Netherlands
- Collection Akzo Nobel Art Foundation, The Netherlands
- Collection De Heus-Zomer, The Netherlands
- Caldic Collection, The Netherlands

== Bibliography ==
- Han Schuil, Material Metaphors, Lynne Cooke, Fodor Magazine, 1987
- Han Schuil, Schilderijen - Paintings 1983-1999, text: Rudi Fuchs, Dominic van den Boogerd, Bert Jansen, Stedelijk Museum Amsterdam, NAI publishers, Rotterdam, 2000
- Han Schuil, Blast, text: Paul Kempers, Galerie Onrust, Amsterdam, 2009
- Han Schuil, Gemälde - Paintings, text: Ulrich Loock Hamish Morrison Galerie, Berlin, 2011
- Han Schuil, Gemälde/paintings, text: Birgit Sonna, Galerie Andreas Binder, München, 2012
