= Slootdorp =

- Village
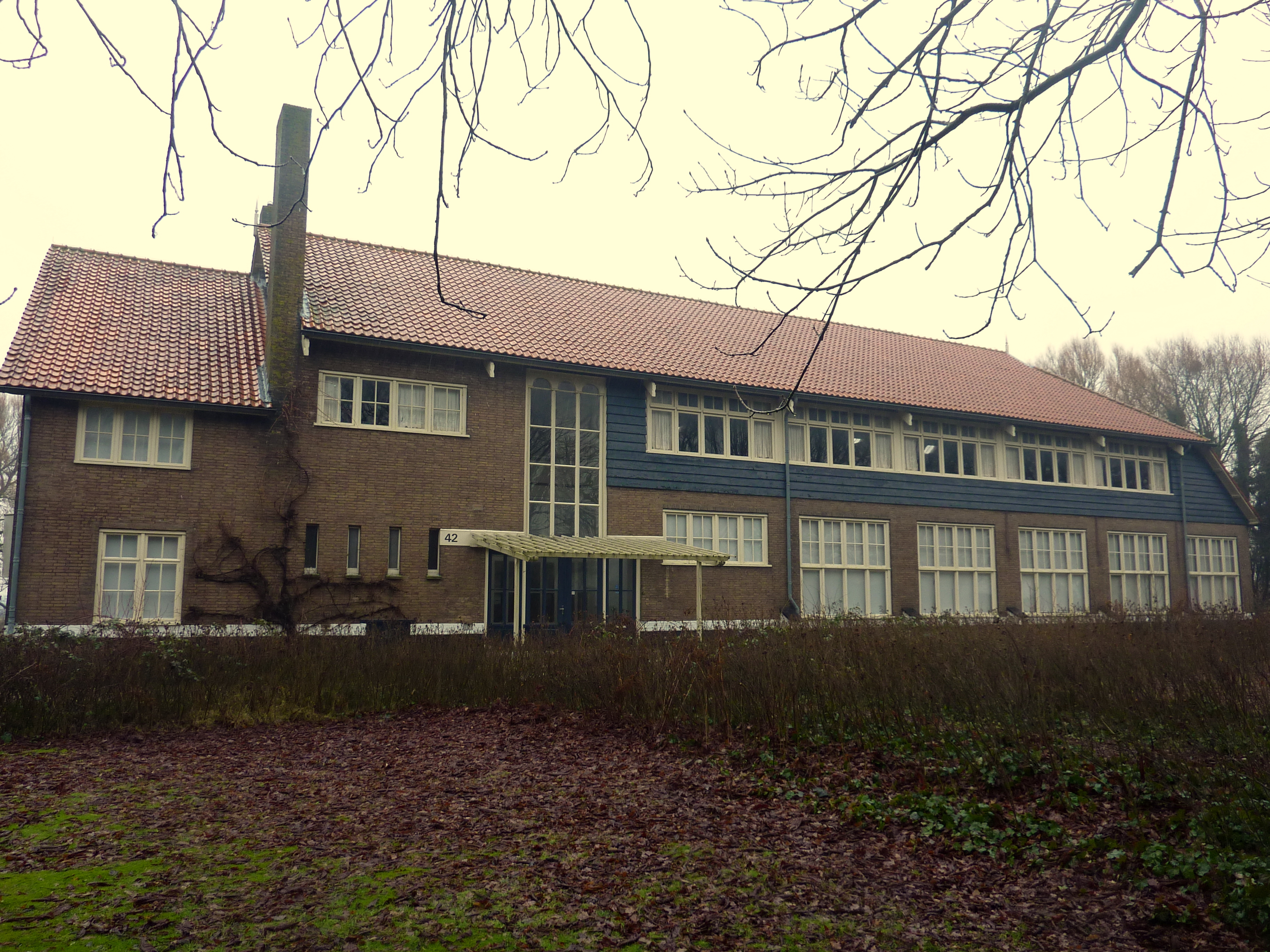
- Jewish agricultural training center

- Location in the Netherlands Location in the province of North Holland in the Netherlands
- Coordinates: 52°50′32″N 4°58′12″E
- Country: Netherlands
- Province: North Holland
- Municipality: Hollands Kroon

Area
  - Village: 65.60 km^{2} (25.33 sq mi)
- Elevation: −3.2 m (−10 ft)

Population (2025)
  - Village: 2,290
  - Density: 34.9/km^{2} (90.4/sq mi)
  - Urban: 1,385
  - Rural: 905
- Time zone: UTC+1 (CET)
  - Summer (DST): UTC+2 (CEST)
- Postal code: 1774
- Dialing code: 0227

Slootdorp is a village in the Dutch province of North Holland. It is a part of the municipality of Hollands Kroon, and lies about 19 km southeast of Den Helder.

The village is a local hub for farming with a small number of shops. The population has been steadily dwindling. It is serviced by a number of intersecting districts canals. A number of local businesses still use these canals as the main method of transport of goods.

In 1939, the agricultural training school in the village took in 300 German Jewish young people to teach them farming. It was one of 30 such training schools established to teach the skills needed for settling in what was then Palestine. The Werkdorp was the largest in Holland. In 1941, Klaus Barbie rounded up the Werkdorpers and sent them to concentration camps, where they were murdered.

== Gallery ==
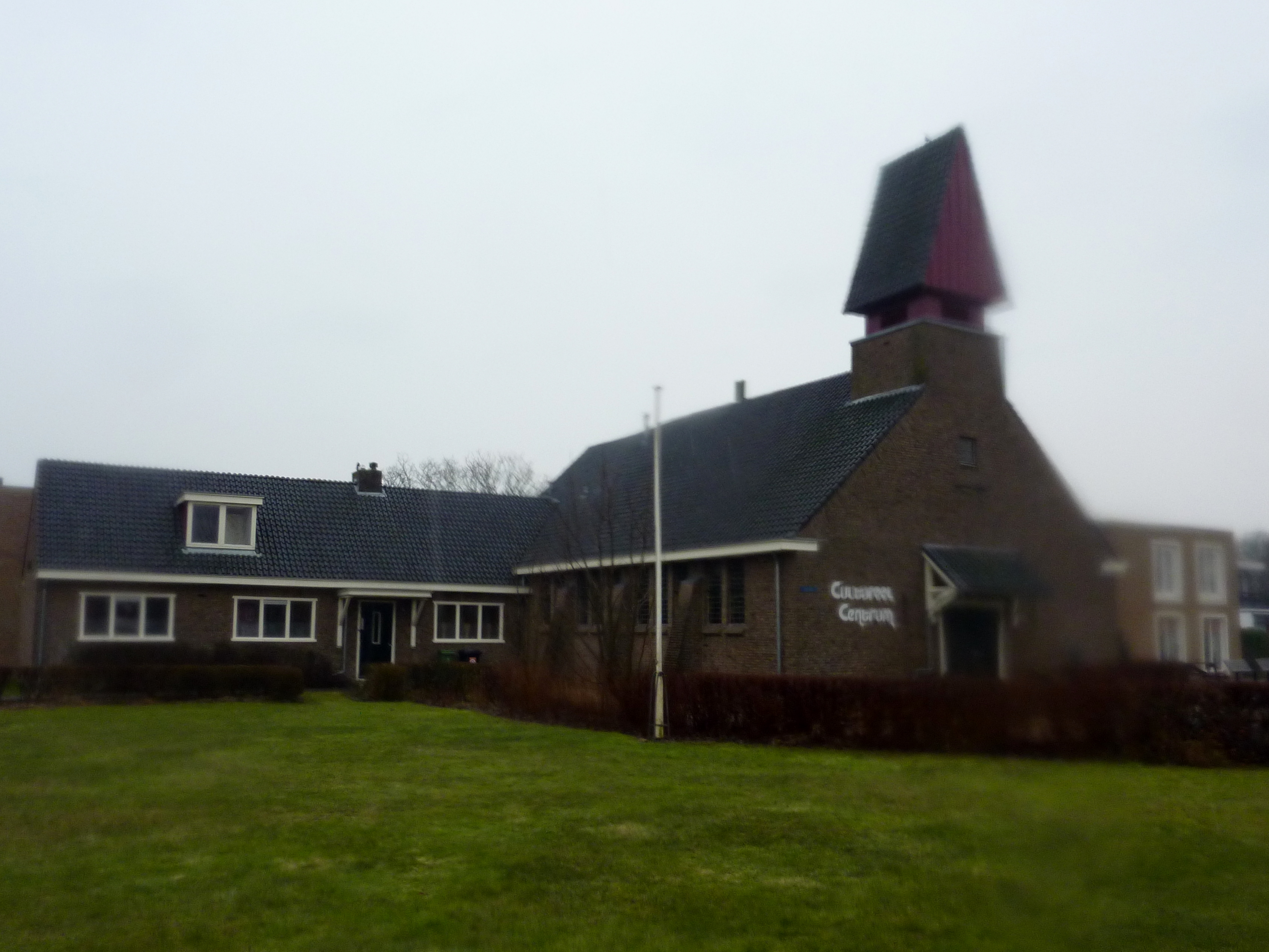
Dutch Reformed church

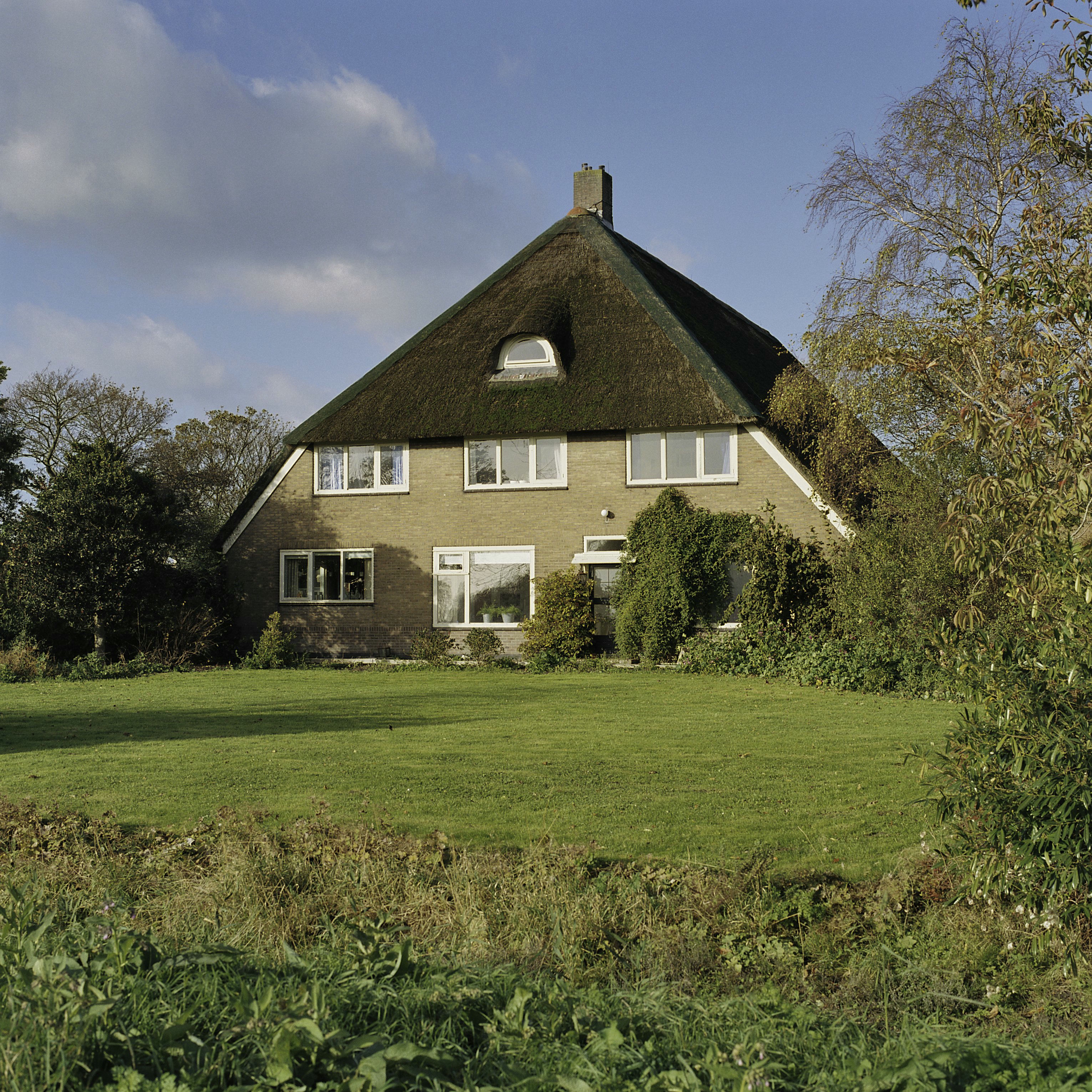
Farm in Slootdorp

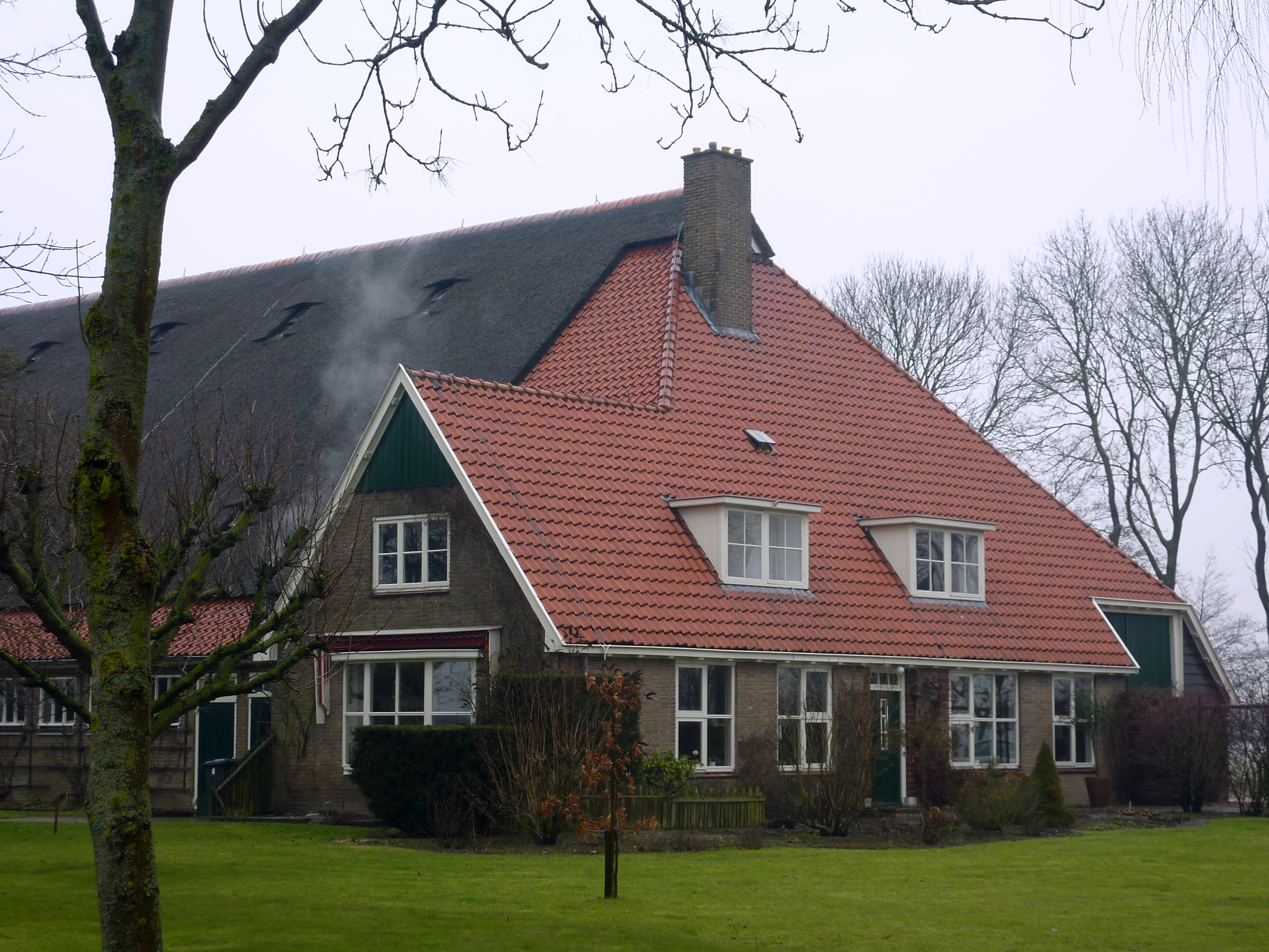
Farm in Slootdorp
