= Bethge =

Bethge is a German surname. Notable people with the surname include:

- Ansgar Bethge (1924–2008), German admiral
- Eberhard Bethge (1909–2000), German Lutheran theologian
- Friedrich Bethge (1891–1963), German poet, playwright and dramatist
- Hans Bethge (disambiguation), multiple people
- Raimund Bethge (born 1947), East German bobsledder
