= Charlotte Posenenske =

German artist

- Born: 28 October 1930; Wiesbaden, Germany
- Died: 1 October 1985 (aged 54); Frankfurt am Main, Germany
- Known for: Sculpture, Painting, Drawing
- Movement: Minimalism, Conceptualism

Charlotte Posenenske, née Mayer (1930–1985) was a German artist associated with the minimalist movement who predominantly worked in sculpture, but also produced paintings and works on paper. Posenenske created series of sculptures that explored systems and structures derived from mass production and standardization.

== Background ==
Posenenske was born in Wiesbaden, Germany. Her father was Jewish. Due to the persecution of Jews in Nazi Germany, he killed himself when Posenenske was aged nine. Two years after this, Charlotte Posenenske went in to hiding to avoid persecution Before becoming a painter and sculptor, Posensenske worked several years as a set and costume designer. Posenenske studied painting with Willi Baumeister in the early 1950s at the State Academy of Fine Arts Stuttgart. She began creating her own artworks in 1956.

== Career ==
Posenenske worked in a variety of mediums, her practice becoming more abstract through the course of the 1960s. After early, improvised “art informel” paintings made with a palette knife or spray gun, she in 1967 and 1968 turned to industrially inspired sculptures of aluminum, steel or cardboard, whose modular components could be combined and reproduced at will. While other artists of the period worked in multiples, where a finite edition of a work could be produced, Posenenske worked in series, meaning that there was no limit to the editions. Her approach toward art was highly democratic. Posenenske rejected the commercial art market, offering her work for sale at its material cost. Reconstructions authorised by the artist’s estate are not replicas, and they are outwardly identical to the original prototype. Only the certificate differentiates the unsigned work from other commodities.

Posenenske's Vierkantrohre Serie (Square Tube Series) consisted of industrially manufactured steel tubes similar in appearance to air conditioning shafts. Her work is similar to ready-mades in appearance, but Posenenske directed production of materials in her work process. Posenenske was an early proponent of inviting interactivity to her artwork through choreographed performances and audience participation. She invited artists and curators to freely rearrange and add to her work in several exhibitions.

In 1968 Posenenske published a statement in the journal Art International referencing the reproducibility of her works, and her desire for the concept and ownership of the piece to be accessible:

I make series
because I do not want to make individual pieces for individuals,
in order to have elements combinable within a system,
in order to make something that is repeatable, objective,
and because it is economical.
The series can be prototypes for mass-production.
[...]
They are less and less recognisable as "works of art."
The objects are not intended to represent anything other than what they are.

Poseneske stopped working as an artist in 1968, no longer believing that art could influence social behavior or draw attention to social inequalities. She retrained as a sociologist and became a specialist in employment and industrial working practices, particularly assembly line production, until her death in 1985. During this period of self-imposed exile Posenenske refused to visit any exhibitions, and did not show her work.

== Work in collections ==
- Untitled, oil on paper, 1960, collection of Museum of Modern Art, New York
- Untitled, felt-tip pen on paper, 1965, collection of Museum of Modern Art, New York
- Untitled, spray paint on paper, 1966, collection of Museum of Modern Art, New York
- Sprayed Picture, gouache on paper, 1964-5, collection of Tate, London
- Prototype for Revolving Vane, particle board, 1967-8, collection of Tate
- Square Tubes [Series D], galvanised steel, 1967, collection of Tate
- Square Tubes [Series D], galvanized steel, 1967, collection of Tate
- 155 works held by the Dia Art Foundation, New York.
- 4 Series B Reliefs (Prototypes), Standard RAL acrylic spray matte yellow on convex curved aluminium, 1967, Centro de Artes Visuales Fundación Helga de Alvear

== Selected solo exhibitions ==
- 2019 Charlotte Posenenske: Lexicon of Infinite Movement, Kröller-Müller Museum, Otterlo, the Netherlands
- 2019 Charlotte Posenenske: Work in Progress, Dia:Beacon, Beacon, New York, United States
- 2012 Dasselbe anders, Düsseldorf, K21, Düsseldorf, Germany
- 2012 Dasselbe anders/Immer dasselbe Charlotte Posenenske und Peter Roehr, Kunsthaus Wiesbaden, Germany
- 2011 Le même autrement-The same, but different, Galerie Nelson-Freeman, Paris, France
- 2011 Charlotte Posenenske, John Hansard Gallery, Southampton, UK
- 2011 Charlotte Posenenske. Vierkantrohre, Reliefs, Faltungen und Arbeiten auf Papier, Galerie Konrad Fischer, Düsseldorf, Germany
- 2010 Charlotte Posenenske / Peter Roehr, Haus Konstruktiv, Zürich, Switzerland
- 2010 Charlotte Posenenske, Artists Space, New York, US
- 2008 Peter Freeman, Inc., New York, US
- 2008 Charlotte Posenenske - Werke unter freiem Himmel, Galerie Mehdi Chouakri, Berlin, Germany
- 2007 Charlotte Posenenske, Galerie Mehdi Chouakri, Berlin, Germany
- 2007 Charlotte Posenenske, Between Bridges, London, UK
- 2005 Galerie im Taxispalais, Innsbruck, Austria
- 2005 Charlotte Posenenske - Retrospektive, Museum für Gegenwartskunst, Siegen, Germany
- 2003 Galerie Konstantin Adamopoulos, Frankfurt am Main, Germany
- 1999 Galerie ak, Programm Konstantin Adamopoulos, Frankfurt am Main, Germany
- 1990 Museum für Moderne Kunst (at the Jahrhunderthalle Hoechst), Frankfurt am Main, Germany
- 1989 Garage of the City Hall, Stuttgart; Rotunda of the Neue Staatsgalerie, Stuttgart
- 1989 Central Station, Stuttgart (curator Werner Esser), Germany
- 1989 Headquarter of the Deutsche Bank, Frankfurt am Main; Central Station, Frankfurt am Main, Germany
- 1988 Central Market, Frankfurt am Main, Germany
- 1986 Galerie Paul Maenz, Cologne, Germany
- 1986 Main airplane hangar, Lufthansa, Frankfurt am Main, Germany
- 1986 Galerie Grässlin-Ehrhardt, Frankfurt am Main, Germany
- 1968 Galerie Art & Project, Amsterdam, Netherlands
- 1968 Galerie Dorothea Loehr, Frankfurt am Main, Germany
- 1967 Konrad Fischer Galerie, Düsseldorf, Germany
- 1967 Kleine Galerie, Schwenningen, Germany
- 1967 Galerie Sous-Sol, Giessen, Germany
- 1967 Galerie h, Hanover, Germany
- 1966 Galerie Dorothea Loehr, Frankfurt am Main, Germany
- 1961 Galerie Dorothea Loehr, Frankfurt am Main, Germany

== Selected group exhibitions ==
- 2012: Art House Wiesbaden: the same different / always the same: Posenenske and Peter Roehr
- 2011: Museum of Modern Art, Frankfurt am Main, exhibition: MMK 1991–2011. 20 years presence
- 2010: Museum of Modern Art, Frankfurt am Main, in the exhibition Radical Conceptual
- 2010: House Structurally, Zurich
- 2007 Documenta 12, Kassel
