= Alighiero Boetti =

Italian conceptual artist (1940–1994)

- Alighiero Boetti
- Born: Alighiero Fabrizio Boetti; 16 December 1940; Turin, Italy
- Died: 24 April 1994 (aged 53); Rome, Italy
- Known for: Painting; Sculpture; Mixed media
- Movement: Arte Povera

Alighiero Fabrizio Boetti, known as Alighiero e Boetti (16 December 1940 – 24 April 1994) was an Italian painter, sculptor and conceptual artist, considered to be a member of the art movement Arte Povera.

== Background ==
Boetti is most famous for a series of embroidered maps of the world, Mappa, created between 1971 and his premature death in 1994. Boetti's work was typified by his notion of 'twinning', leading him to add 'e' (and) between his names, 'stimulating a dialectic exchange between these two selves'.

== Life ==
Alighiero Boetti was born in Turin, to Corrado Boetti, a lawyer, and Adelina Marchisio, a violinist. Boetti abandoned his studies at the business school of the University of Turin to work as an artist. Already in his early years, he had profound and wide-ranging theoretical interests and studied works on such diverse topics as philosophy, alchemy and esoterics. Among the preferred authors of his youth were the German writer Hermann Hesse and the Swiss-German painter and Bauhaus teacher Paul Klee. Boetti also had a continuing interest in mathematics and music.

At seventeen, Boetti discovered the works of the German painter Wols and the cut canvases of Argentine-Italian artist Lucio Fontana. Boetti's own works of his late teen years, however, are oil paintings somewhat reminiscent of the Russian painter Nicolas de Staël. At age twenty, Boetti moved to Paris to study engraving. In 1962, while in France, he met art critic and writer Annemarie Sauzeau, whom he was to marry in 1964 and with whom he had two children, Matteo (1967) and Agata (1972). From 1974 to 1976, he travelled to Guatemala, Ethiopia, and Sudan. Boetti was passionate about non-Western cultures, particularly of central and southern Asia, and travelled to Afghanistan and Pakistan numerous times in the 1970s and 1980s, although Afghanistan became inaccessible to him following the Soviet invasion in 1979. In 1975, he went back to New York.

Active as an artist from the early 1960s to his premature death in 1994, Boetti developed a significant body of diverse works that were often both poetic and pleasing to the eye while at the same time steeped in his diverse theoretical interests and influenced by his extensive travels.

He died of a brain tumour in Rome in 1994 at the age of 53.

== Career ==
=== Arte Povera ===
From 1963 to 1965, Boetti began to create works out of then unusual materials such as plaster, masonite, plexiglass, light fixtures and other industrial materials. His first solo show was in 1967, at the Turin gallery of Christian Stein. Later that year, he participated in an exhibition at Galleria La Bertesca in the Italian city of Genoa, with a group of other Italian artists that referred to their works as Arte Povera, or poor art, a term subsequently widely propagated by Italian art critic Germano Celant.

Boetti continued to work with a wide array of materials, tools, and techniques, including ball pens (biro) and even the postal system. Some of Boetti's artistic strategies are considered typical for Arte Povera, namely the use of the most modest materials and techniques, to take art off its pedestal of attributed "dignity". Boetti also took a keen interest in the relationship between chance and order, in various systems of classification (grids, maps, etc.), and non-Western traditions and cultural practices, influenced by his Afghanistan and Pakistan travels.

An example of his Arte Povera work is Lampada annuale (Yearly Lamp) (1966), a single, outsized light bulb in a mirror-lined wooden box, which randomly switches itself on for eleven seconds each year. This work focuses both on the transformative powers of energy, and on the possibilities and limitations of chance – the likelihood of a viewer being present at the moment of illumination is remote. In 1967, Boetti produced the piece Manifesto, a poster listing the names of artists who make up Boetti's creative background.

Dossier Postale (1969–70) consists of a series of letters which were sent to 26 well-known recipients, primarily artists (Giulio Paolini, Bruce Nauman), art critics (Lucy Lippard, Arturo Schwarz), dealers (Konrad Fischer, Leo Castelli), and collectors (Giuseppe Panza, Corrado Levi) active at the time. Boetti sent the envelopes to imaginary addresses, thus each letter was returned to the artist undelivered, demonstrating Boetti's preoccupation with improbability and chance.

=== 1972–1994 ===
Boetti disassociated himself from the Arte Povera movement in 1972 and moved to Rome, without, however, completely abandoning some of its democratic, anti-elitist strategies. In 1973, he renamed himself as a dual persona Alighiero e Boetti ("Alighiero and Boetti"), reflecting the opposing factors presented in his work: the individual and society, error and perfection, order and disorder. Already in his double-portrait I Gemelli begun in 1968 and published as a postcard, Boetti had altered photographs so that he appeared to be holding the hand of his identical twin.

He often collaborated with both artists and non-artists, giving them significant freedom in their contributions to his works. For instance, one of the better known types of his works consists of colored letters embroidered in grids ("arazzi", meaning wall hangings or tapestries) on canvases of varying sizes, the letters upon closer inspection reading as short phrases in Italian, for instance Ordine e Disordine ("Order and Disorder") or Fuso Ma Non Confuso ("Mixed but not mixed up"), or similar truisms and wordplays. To create these pictures, Boetti worked with artisan embroiderers in Afghanistan and Pakistan, to whom he gave his designs but increasingly handed over the process of selecting and combining the colours and thus deciding the final aesthetic look of the work.

Similarly, in the lavori biro (ball pen paintings), he would invite friends and acquaintances to fill large coloured sections of the multi-part work by ball pen, typically alternating between a man and a woman from one sheet to another. Boetti made his first ballpoint ink drawings in 1972–73 and continued through the late 1980s. The largest of all Boetti's Biro works are the four versions of Ononimo (1973), with their progressions of eleven separate panels, each hand-coloured in biro (two in blue biro and two in red).

His most ambitious project is a large embroidered piece titled Classificazione dei mille fiumi piu lunghi del mondo (Classification of the thousand longest rivers in the world) (1977).

Following an invitation by Hans Ulrich Obrist, the artist published six of his watercolour drawings in Austrian Airlines' in-flight magazine 'Sky Lines'. To accompany this publication, jigsaws of the images were produced and were available to passengers on the flights at this time.

In 1986, he took part in the Lucio Amelio's exhibition "Terrae Motus". After the 1980 Irpinia earthquake, the Neapolitan gallerist asked the major contemporary artists of that time to realise a work of art about the earthquake; so Boetti realised for this occasion Di palo in frasca nell'estate dell'anno millenovecentottantasei, accanto al Pantheon, a reflection on the concepts of time and thinking: the monkey stands for the human thought's capacity to jump from one thought to another.

=== Embroideries ===
Mappa (1978)

Perhaps best known is Boetti's series of large embroidered maps of the world, called simply Mappa. After the Six-Day War in June 1967, the artist began to collect newspaper covers featuring maps of war zones. He then asked his wife to embroider the shapes from the June 1967 map. He pondered the idea of the first large-scale Mappa during his second voyage to Afghanistan in 1971, resulting in a series of woven world maps entitled Territori Occupati. Between 1971 and 1979 he set up the One Hotel with his friend and business partner Gholam Dastaghir in Kabul as a kind of artistic commune and created large colourful embroideries, the most famous of these were the Mappa, world maps in which each country features the design of its national flag. In 1971, Boetti commissioned women at an embroidery school in Kabul to embroider his first map. He initially intended to make only one but went on to commission roughly 150 of them in his lifetime, with no two possessing exactly the same dimensions.

Boetti's maps reflect a changing geopolitical world from 1971 to 1994, a period that included the collapse of the Soviet Union and the fall of the Berlin Wall. Embroidered by up to 500 artisans in Afghanistan and Pakistan, the maps were the result of a collaborative process, leaving the design to the geopolitical realities of the time, and the choice of colours to the artisans responsible for the embroidery. The maps delineate the political boundaries of the countries. In one map, the sea is unexpectedly coloured pink rather than blue, as landlocked Afghans had no tradition of mapping, certainly not of oceans. The border texts contain dates or details relative to the work's production, Boetti's signature and sayings, as well as excerpts from Sufi poetry.

"For me the work of the embroidered Mappa is the maximum of beauty. For that work I did nothing, chose nothing, in the sense that: the world is made as it is, not as I designed it, the flags are those that exist, and I did not design them; in short I did absolutely nothing; when the basic idea, the concept, emerges everything else requires no choosing." Alighiero e Boetti, 1974

Today the Nineteenth Day of the Eighth Month of the Year OneThousandNine100Eighty-Eight (1988) at the National Gallery of Art in 2022

The brightly coloured Arazzi works are embroidered pieces made in various sizes that depict sentences drawn from poetry, wisdoms from around the world, or sayings invented by Boetti himself. The Arazzi grandi, containing messages in both Italian and Persian, are each distinct, recording the date when they were created, and containing an elaborate internal code that prescribes the order of the sentences on display. They contrast geometric European letters and flowing Persian calligraphy in checkerboard patterns, alternating bands, grids or cruciform shapes. The dates, carefully noted on each Arazzi grandi, mark a point of captivation for Boetti, as he was deeply interested in the concept of time and its inevitable passing.

The embroidery of each map normally took one to two years and, in some cases, much longer due to geopolitical events. Following the closure of the Afghan border, Boetti was forced to abandon this practice and work remotely from Italy. This work began in his studio in Rome, with the artist outlining the countries in felt-tip pen onto linen, before sending the cloth framework to Afghanistan. The invasion of Afghanistan by Russian troops in 1979 shifted production completely from Kabul to Peshawar in Pakistan, where the group of Afghan women had taken refuge and where Boetti was only able to reconnect with them through middlemen. It also halted production completely until 1982, with only a few maps being made between 1982 and 1985. During the 1980s, Boetti visited Pakistan to meet the men organising the embroidery. As a European male, however, Boetti was not allowed to visit the camps. He therefore asked photographer Randi Malkin Steinberger, with whom he had collaborated on the book Accanto al Pantheon in Rome, to go to Peshawar in 1990 to photograph the craftswomen at work.

A chief example of this series, Mappa del Mondo, 1989 ("Map of the World, 1989"), is on view in the permanent collection of the Museum of Modern Art in New York (see Key Works).

== Exhibitions ==
Having shown in Milan and Turin, Boetti was invited by Harald Szeemann to participate in the seminal exhibition "Live in your Head. When Attitudes Become Form" in 1969. Boetti had his first US solo exhibition in New York at John Weber Gallery in 1973. In 1978, he held an anthological exhibition curated by Jean-Christophe Ammann at the Kunsthalle Basel that featured historical works alongside more recent ones. He was the subject of a retrospective in 1992 that travelled to Bonn and Münster, Germany, and Lucerne, Switzerland. He was honored with several exhibitions after his death, most notably at the Galleria Nazionale d'Arte Moderna, Rome (1996); the Museum für Moderne Kunst in Vienna in 1997; the Museum für Moderne Kunst in Frankfurt am Main in 1998; Whitechapel Gallery, London (1999); and Kunstmuseum Liechtenstein, Vaduz. The artist took part in Documentas 5 (1972) and 7 (1982) and the Venice Biennale (1978, 1980, 1986, 1990, 1995). In 2001, the Venice Pavilion was completely dedicated to Alighiero e Boetti's work. In 2012, for the exhibition Game Plan, a significant number of works were lent to the MoMA by Tornabuoni Art Gallery.

=== Select exhibitions ===
- Galleria Christian Stein, Turin, Italy, 1967
- Arte Povera, Galleria La Bertesca, Genoa, 1967 (group exhibition)
- Shaman Showman, Galleria De Nieubourg, Milan, Italy, 1969
- When Attitude Becomes Form, curated by Harald Szeemann, Kunsthalle Bern, Switzerland, 1969 (group exhibition)
- Io che prendo il sole a Torino il 24 February 1969, Galleria Sperone, Turin, Italy, 1969.
- John Weber Gallery, New York, 1973
- Mettere al mondo il mondo, Sperone-Fischer Gallery, Rome, Italy, 1973
- Kunstmuseum Lucerne, Switzerland, 1975.
- Kunsthalle Basel, curated by Jean-Christophe Amman, Basel, Switzerland, 1978
- Art Agency Tokyo, Tokyo, Japan, 1980.
- 44th Venice Biennale, Venice, Italy, 1990.
- Synchronizitaet als ein Prinzip akausaler Zusammenhaenge, Kunstverein, Bonn, Germany; Westfalischer Kunstverein, Munster, Germany; Kunstmuseum, Lucerne, Switzerland, 1992–1993
- Alternando da 1 a 100 e viceversa, Centre National d'Art Contemporain de Grenoble, Grenoble, France, 1993
- Museum of Contemporary Art, Los Angeles, California, 1994
- P.S.1 Museum, Long Island City, New York, 1994.
- Alighiero e Boetti, part of the project, Origin and Destination, Societe des Expositions du Palais des Beaux-Arts de Bruxelles, Brussels, Belgium, 1994
- Alighiero Boetti, Galleria Civica d'Arte Moderna e Contemporanea, Turin, Italy; Musee d'Art Moderne, Villeneuve d'Ascq, France; Museum Moderner Kunst, Stiftung Ludwig, Vienna, Austria, 1996–97
- Alighiero Boetti: Mettere al mondo il mondo ("Bringing the World into the World") – Museum für Moderne Kunst, Frankfurt am Main, Germany, and Galerie Jahrhunderthalle Hoechst, Germany, 1998
- Boetti; the maverick spirit of Arte Povera, Whitechapel Art Gallery, London, 1999
- Zero to Infinity, Arte Povera 1962–1972 – Tate Modern, London,' Walker Art Center, Minneapolis, MN, 2001–2002
- When 1 is 2: The Art of Alighiero e Boetti – Contemporary Arts Museum Houston, TX, 2002
- Quasi Tutto, Galleria d'Arte Moderna e Contemporanea, Bergamo, Italy, 2004.
- 2012 Tate Modern retrospective.
- "Alighiero Boetti: Game Plan" MoMA, NY, 2012.

== Key works (selection) ==
- Mappa del Mondo, 1989 ("Map of the World, 1989"), Afghan embroidery on fabric, Collection of the Museum of Modern Art, New York (image)
- Tutto ("Everything"), 1994, Afghan embroidery on fabric, collection of the Museum of Modern Art in Frankfurt am Main, Germany (image)

== Art market ==
The most expensive artwork by Boetti was a Mappa (1989-1991), one of his embroideries, who sold by $8,827,100 at Sotheby's New York, on 16 November 2022.

== Lawsuit disputes ==
In 1995, the Archivio Alighiero Boetti, based in Rome, was created for the issuance of certificates of authenticity for works by Boetti.

In 2008, lawsuits were filed between Sperone Westwater Gallery (the artist's primary dealer at the time) and the Archivio Alighiero Boetti (and some family members) over the authenticity of 15 works exhibited and sold by the gallery in its 2002 show "Simmetria Asimmetria". In a January 2008 suit by the archive against the gallery in Milan, the archive sought declaratory judgment that it is not liable to the gallery for not authenticating the works in dispute, and additionally claims that the gallery violated its "moral rights" by exhibiting, publishing, and selling works of art attributed to Boetti. Sperone Westwater, in return, sued the Boetti Archive in the United States District Court for the Southern District of New York for what it alleges is a broad scheme to discredit it by capriciously questioning the authenticity of Boetti artworks it has shown and sold in the United States; this included one that was purchased by the Art Institute of Chicago. In the New York suit, Sperone Westwater asked the judge to make a declaratory judgment that the archive has no moral rights claims and also seeks damages "for the Defendants' injuries to the gallery's business and reputation," on counts of breach of implied covenant of good faith and fair dealing, negligent misrepresentation, and interference with business relations.
