= Sandra Mann =

German artist and photographer

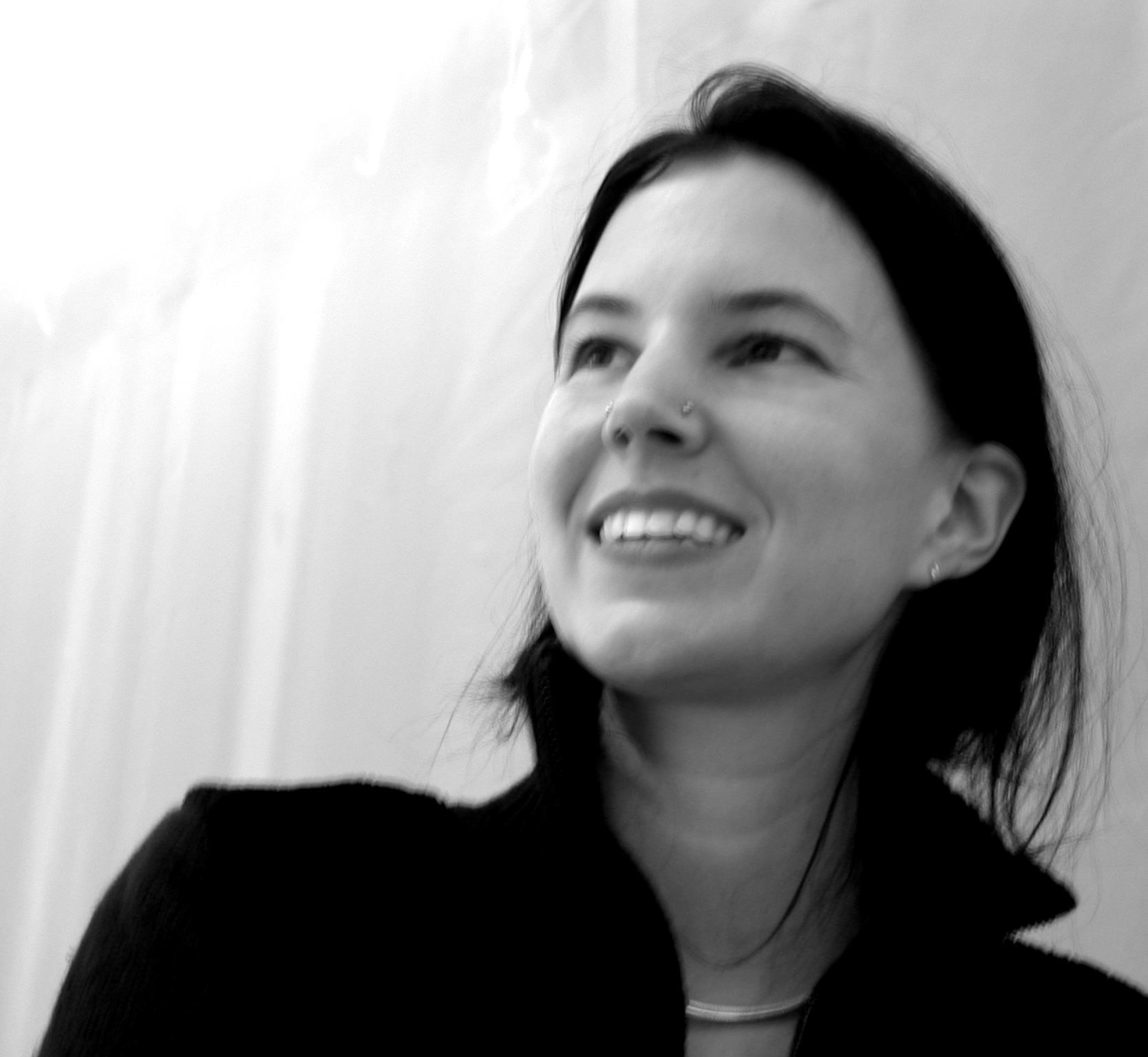
Sandra Mann, 2002

Sandra Mann (born 27 October 1970 in Groß-Gerau) is a German artist and photographer. In her cross-genre work, she deals conceptually with the relationship between people, with nature, the environment, the animal world and gender issues. Her work is characterized by research into the fundamentals of photography and visual language. In 2021, she was awarded the Goethe plaque from the city of Frankfurt am Main.

== Early life and education ==
Sandra Mann studied art history at the Goethe University Frankfurt and studied visual communication at the Hochschule für Gestaltung Offenbach am Main with Heiner Blum, Rudolf Bonvie, and Lewis Baltz. While still a student, Jean-Christophe Ammann acquired several of her works for the Museum of Modern Art in Frankfurt and exhibited them. She financed her studies with part-time jobs in bars and clubs. During this time she staged people from the nightlife, such as B. bouncers, bartenders or DJs, in the style of saints. The first orders from music and lifestyle magazines followed, as well as photo orders for well-known companies (e.g. Atelier Markgraf, Daimler Chrysler / Lab01, Expo 2000). Record covers, portraits, fashion shots and photo room designs were created. Mann became known for her photo impressions from the glamor and party world of the metropolises Paris, Milan and New York.

Although she sees her photographs as individual works, she often arranges them in exhibitions into slide shows and wall installations. This creates visual chains of associations that place the images in contexts that define the artist's thinking for the viewer.

== Work ==
Mann makes use of a wide range of artistic forms of expression. Her main creative focus is on photography. She researches and works in various media areas such as B. spatial installations, sculptures, videos, multimedia installations, artistic interventions, and design.

A recurring element of her work is dealing with boundaries and their abolition. The mixing of different media areas as a means of expression is part of their content-related analysis. One of her first video works, the music video Biomechanics, was created for Anthony Rother. She took photos with a Nikon F3, serially with a motor. Instead of filming, she had the slides scanned and animated, and in this way obtained a video in 35 mm quality. In 2001, she transformed an empty business space into a Schnaken memorial. Representing a fictional funeral home, she presented the mosquitoes in small coffins, accompanied by a rich buffet, funeral music and a book of condolences, and in the Buddhist way thought of a tiny insect that is more known as a nuisance than as a memorable animal.

Sandra Mann achieved her international breakthrough in 2005 with a second version of her work Expedit.

In the exhibition "Morir de Amor" at the Museo Universitario de Ciencias y Arte in Mexico City (MUCA) she exhibited with Marina Abramović, Tracey Emin, Nikki S. Lee, Bas Jan Ader, Sophie Calle, Douglas Gordon, Félix González-Torres, and Dominique Gonzalez-Foersterout. From a distance, at first glance, Expedit appears to be a kind of abstract painting with a frame. On closer inspection, you can see that it is an installation in the form of an ordinary Ikea shelf that the artist had built into a wall and filled with records. The shelf and the back of the record cover only look out 5 cm, hence the initial painting character. If you approach the work, you can read that the songs and albums are love songs that contain the word love. In doing so, she managed to visualize, compress and archive one of the greatest feelings of humanity.

The video “Balla Balla” from 2005 shows at first glance a group of women veiled in a chador playing football in front of an abandoned industrial site. The viewer is misled by the images: In fact, the women are not playing in the Middle East, but in Frankfurt am Main, on the grounds of the empty wholesale market hall. In 2002 the grounds of the wholesale market hall were bought by the European Central Bank. In the Third Reich it was used as a deportation station for Jewish children, women and men. The supposed Muslim women are actually a German women's soccer team of various religions, which confidently deals with the inconvenience of the superimposed culture. This is evident from the professional style of play. The video is musically underlaid with the techno piece “Apricot” by Sven Väth, which increases the irritation of the viewer – something is wrong here.

In autumn 2008, the Vehbi Koç Foundation, curated by the artist Ekrem Yalcindag, dedicated an exhibition to her in the Operation Room exhibition hall of the American Hospital in Istanbul. Since 2012, Mann has dedicated her series Waldlife to the topics of diversity, climate change and nature conservation.

Mann lives in Frankfurt am Main, led the photography class at the AVA Academy of Visual Arts / Frankfurter Akademie für Kommunikation und Design and has been teaching photography and imagery at the European School of Design since 2011.

Her works are represented at the Museum of Modern Art, the Kunsthalle Mannheim, the Tyrolean State Museum, the MUCA in Mexico City, the Vehbi Koc Foundation in the American Hospital in Istanbul, and the Art Collection of the Deutsche Börse Photography Foundation.

Sandra Mann is a member of the German Association of Artists. In 2016/17 she was an art ambassador for the Palmengarten and Botanical Garden Foundation and has been an art ambassador for the Keep The World Foundation since 2017.

== Exhibitions and projects ==
- 1999 Kommunikation in der Kunst, Kunstverein Heidelberg
- 1999 Spur 015, Kunstverein Marburg
- 2000 See-Touch-Listen, Fotografien im Daimler-Chrysler-Pavillon, LAB 01, Expo Hannover
- 2001 freie Wahlen Junge Kunst, Staatliche Kunsthalle, Baden-Baden
- 2001 Expedit und Exodus, Szenenwechsel XX, Museum für Moderne Kunst Frankfurt am Main
- 2002 Release, Leuchtspur, Hauptzollamt Frankfurt am Main
- 2003 natürlich-körperlich-sinnlich, Kunsthalle Mannheim
- 2004 Emporter des femmes à Paris, Goethe-Institut, Athen
- 2004 Nightlife, Artisti per Alcamo, Castello dei Conti di Modica, Goetheinstitut Palermo
- 2005 Morir de Amor, MUCA, Museo Universitario de Ciencias y Arte, Mexiko-City
- 2005 Stadtluft, Landesausstellung, Tiroler Landesmuseum Ferdinandeum, Hall
- 2005 Balla Balla, Der neue Orient (Lido), Kunsthalle Düsseldorf
- 2005 Video/ökonomie – Vertriebe im Weltformat, ZKM, Karlsruhe
- 2006 Marie Therese, New Talents Förderkoje, Art Cologne, Galerie Stefan Röpke
- 2006 Fullhouse, Kunsthalle Mannheim
- 2007 P., T., A. & Landscapes, Photofestival Milan, Galleria San Carlo New Contemporary, Milano
- 2007 Gestalte/Create-Design Medien Kunst, MAK, Museum für Angewandte Kunst, Frankfurt am Main
- 2008 IMAGINe/g of thinking, HIAP, Kaapelitehdas, Helsinki
- 2008 Elk Test, Kaapelin Galleria, Helsinki
- 2008 Daylife, Operation Room, Vehbi Koc Foundation, American Hospital, Istanbul
- 2010 Darmstädter Tage der Fotografie, Kunsthalle Darmstadt
- 2011 Alptraum, Deutscher Künstlerbund, Berlin
- 2011 No Fashion please!, Strapinski’s Schicksal, Kunsthalle Wien
- 2016 Doppelgänger, Torrance Art Museum, Torrance, US
- 2 September 2016 – 28 April 2017, "The Female Portrait", Deutsche Börse Photography Foundation, The Cube, Eschborn
- 2017 Sandra Mann-Büchsenlicht, Kunsthalle Gießen
- 2018 Sandra Mann / Waldlife, Stadtgalerie im Badehaus, Bad Soden
- 2019 Sandra Mann feat. Valentina Stanojev / Arkadischer Wandel, kjubh Kunstverein Köln
- 2019 The German Way of Life II, Haus am Dom, Frankfurt am Main
- 2019 Sandra Mann-Waldlife, Goethe-Institut Hanoi, New Space Arts Foundation, Hue, Vietnam
- 2020 Qipo Fair 02, Mexico City
