= Hohlfeld =

Hohlfeld is a surname. Notable people with the surname include:

- Alexander Rudolf Hohlfeld (1865–1956), German-American university professor
- Brian Hohlfeld (born 1957), American screenwriter
- Wesley Newcomb Hohfeld (1879–1918), American jurist
- Vera Hohlfeld (born 1972), German Olympic athlete
