= Francis Walter =

Francis Walter may refer to:

- Francis E. Walter, U.S. Representative from Pennsylvania
- Francis Walter (cross-country skier), British cross-country skier
- Frank Walter (Francis Archibald Wentworth Walter), Antiguan artist
