= Richard Merton =

Richard Merton may refer to:

- Pseudonym for Perry Anderson (born 1938), British intellectual and essayist
- Richard Merton (industrialist) (1881–1960), German industrialist, recipient of the Goethe Plaque of the City of Frankfurt
