= Peter Iden =

German director and critic (1938–2026)

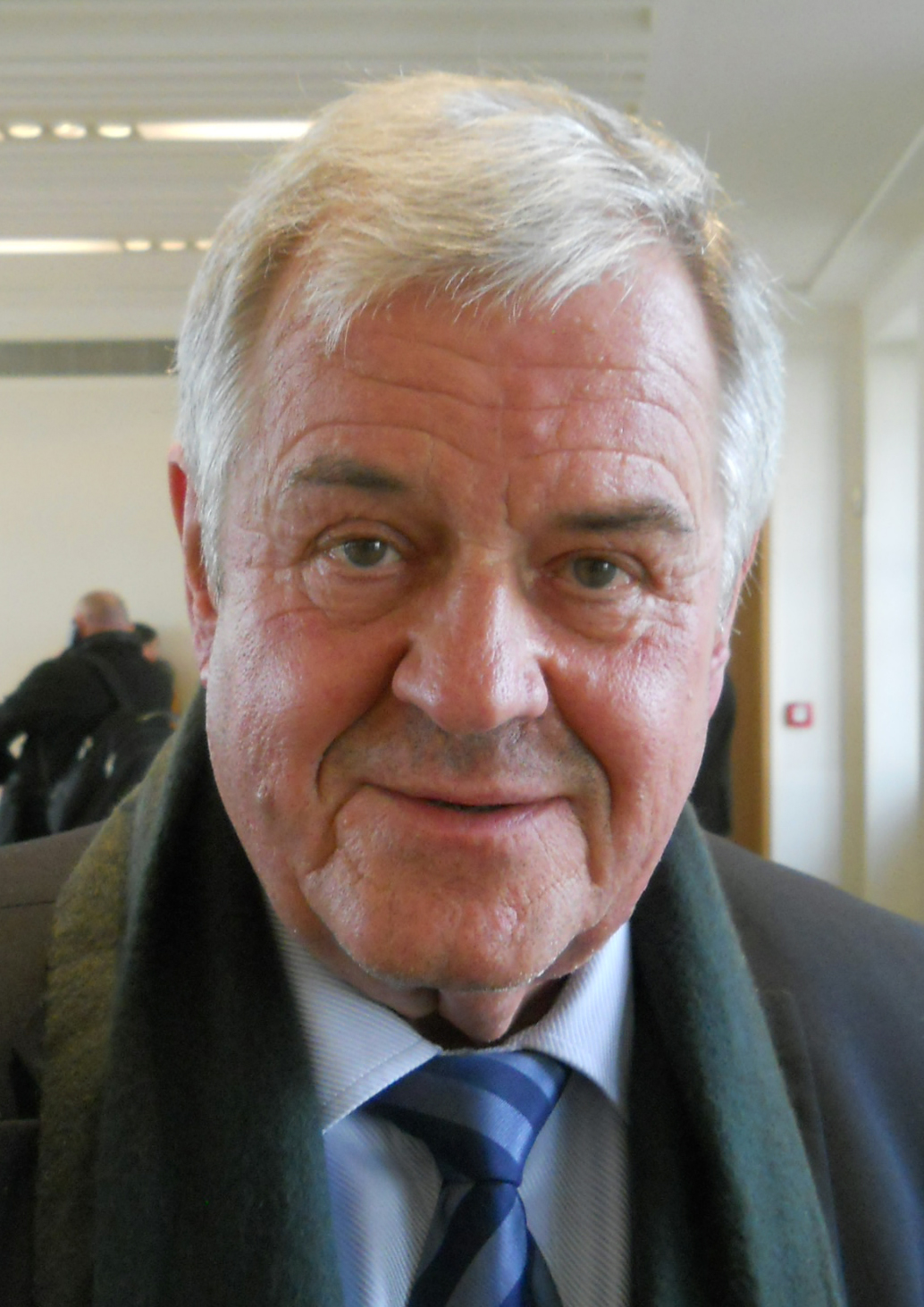
- Iden in 2013
- Born: 11 September 1938; Meseritz, Germany
- Died: 12 November 2026 (aged 88); Frankfurt, Hesse, Germany
- Occupations: Journalist; Art critic; Academic teacher
- Organizations: Frankfurter Rundschau; Museum für Moderne Kunst; Frankfurt University of Music and Performing Arts
- Awards: Goethe-Plakette des Landes Hessen; Goetheplakette der Stadt Frankfurt am Main

Peter Iden (11 September 1938 – 12 November 2026) was a German theatre and art critic, drama festival director, museum director and academic teacher. He shaped cultural life in Frankfurt over decades, as a cultural journalist for the Frankfurter Rundschau from 1961, later also head of the art section until 2000, as co-founder of the drama festival Experimenta, as a founding director of the Museum für Moderne Kunst in Frankfurt, and as professor of theatre and art theory at the University of Music and Performing Arts.

== Life and career ==
Iden was born in Meseritz, Germany, now Międzyrzecz, Poland, on 11 September 1938. His family fled the Soviet Red Army to the British-occupied area and settled in Lauenburg on the Elbe. There, Iden grew up and attended the humanist branch of the Johanneum high school in Lüneburg. From 1955, he spent two years in California. After moving to Frankfurt am Main and graduating from the Helmholtz School in Frankfurt in 1958, Iden studied philosophy, history and theatre at Goethe University in Frankfurt. He studied with Theodor W. Adorno and Max Horkheimer. Afterwards he continued his studies at the University of Vienna, where he was friends with artists Arnulf Rainer and Markus Prachensky.

Iden was an assistant to stage director Erwin Piscator. From 1961 he was also a cultural journalist as an art and theater critic for the Frankfurter Rundschau, for which he penned over 3000 contributions under the editorial code P.I. He watched in 1963 a performance of Shakespeare's Twelfth Night in Wiesbaden, directed by Fritz Kortner, which won him for the theatre. Iden wrote his first international review of a play in London in 1965, about a production in which Peter Brook questioned the Vietnam War. Prompted by Piscator, he founded in 1966, together with Karlheinz Braun, a drama festival, Experimenta, at the Theater am Turm. For five years, it introduced the Frankfurt audience to works by Brecht, Beckett, Handke and others in productions of international avantgarde companies. He invited composers such as John Cage and Kagel. Braun said in retrospect that the festival "opened the doors to a new theatre of the 20th century". In 1972 they organised a similar event for the documenta 5 exhibition.

In 1975 Iden attended the Schiller Theater in Berlin Beckett's Warten auf Godot, directed by its author. In his reviews, he liked production's by Peter Zadek, Claus Peymann, Giorgio Strehler and Dieter Dorn, and he favoured works by Luc Bondy, Klaus Michael Grüber and Peter Stein at the Schaubühne in Berlin. An obituary in the Süddeutsche Zeitung noted that he found in the works of latter three a "concentration of language, body and story that he looked for in theatre", but that he was not always able to do justice to directors he disliked, including Hans Neuenfels and Einar Schleef.

From 1978 to 1987, Iden was the founding director of the Museum für Moderne Kunst in Frankfurt. In 1981, after long negotiations with the heirs of Darmstadt entrepreneur Karl Ströher, he was able to acquire 87 works of U.S. pop and minimalist art, as well as high-quality German and European works of art created between the 1950s and the 1970s for the museum under construction. Iden expanded the collection until 1987, including important works of German and European art. Then in 1988, Jean-Christophe Ammann took over the management of the museum and in 1991 opened the new building designed by the Viennese architect Hans Hollein.

From 1982 on, Iden was professor of theatre and art theory at the Frankfurt University of Music and Performing Arts, and head of the theatre department. He was from 1973 editor-in-chief, and from 1993 to 2000 head of the arts section (Feuilleton) of the Frankfurter Rundschau.

In June 2004, Iden conducted an interview with Jutta Lampe sharing the event of the metamorphosis for the review of the Strasbourg National Theater L'Outrescène. In 2009, Iden was the spokesperson for the curators of the much-loved "Sixty Years. Sixty works – Art of the Federal Republic of Germany" at the Martin-Gropius-Bau in Berlin. Iden was the author and editor of numerous writings on contemporary theater and contemporary art.

=== Personal life ===
Iden had a summer house on Lake Garda, Italy. He was a passionate football fan.

Iden died in Frankfurt on 12 November 2026, at the age of 88.

== Awards ==
Iden received the Goethe-Plakette des Landes Hessen in 1995 and the Goetheplakette der Stadt Frankfurt am Main in 2006.

== Publications ==
- Peter Iden, Dieter Hacker, Oedipus: Maler: neue Bilder und Blätter, Catalogue, éd. Brusberg, Berlin, 1992
- Peter Iden, Der Schein, was ist er, dem das Wesen fehlt?, Patronatsverein für die Theater der Stadt Frankfurt am Main, Francfort-sur-le-Main, 1992
- Peter Iden, Meine liebste Rolle, Insel Verlag, Frankfurt, 1993 (ISBN 3-458-33224-3)
- Peter Iden, Warum wir das Theater brauchen, Suhrkamp, Frankfurt, 1995 (ISBN 3-518-38983-1)
- Ingrid Mössinger, Peter Iden, Sam Francis, the shadow of colors, Kunstverein Ludwisgsburg, Ludwigsburg, 1995 (ISBN 3-905514-49-4)
- Ingrid Mössinger, Peter Iden, Sam Francis, the shadow of colors, éd. Stemmle, Kilchberg/Zurich, 1995 (ISBN 3-905514-59-1)
- Peter Iden, Jürgen Flimm, Fischer-Taschenbuch-Verl., Francfort-sur-le-Main, 1996 (ISBN 3-596-10544-7)
- Ingrid Mössinger, Beate Ritter, Gottfried Boehm, Peter Iden, Wieland Schmied, Raimund Girke zum Siebzigsten, Quantum Books, 2000 (ISBN 3-935293-02-X)
- Éric Darragon, Peter Iden, Beate L. Ritter, Georg Baselitz: Mondrians Schwester, Berlin, 1997 / Kunstsammlungen Chemnitz, Kulturstiftung der Länder, 2003
- Peter Palitzsch, Peter Iden, Theater muss die Welt verändern, Henschel, Berlin, 2005 (ISBN 3-89487-511-9)
