= Serge Spitzer =

Romanian-born American artist (1951-2012)

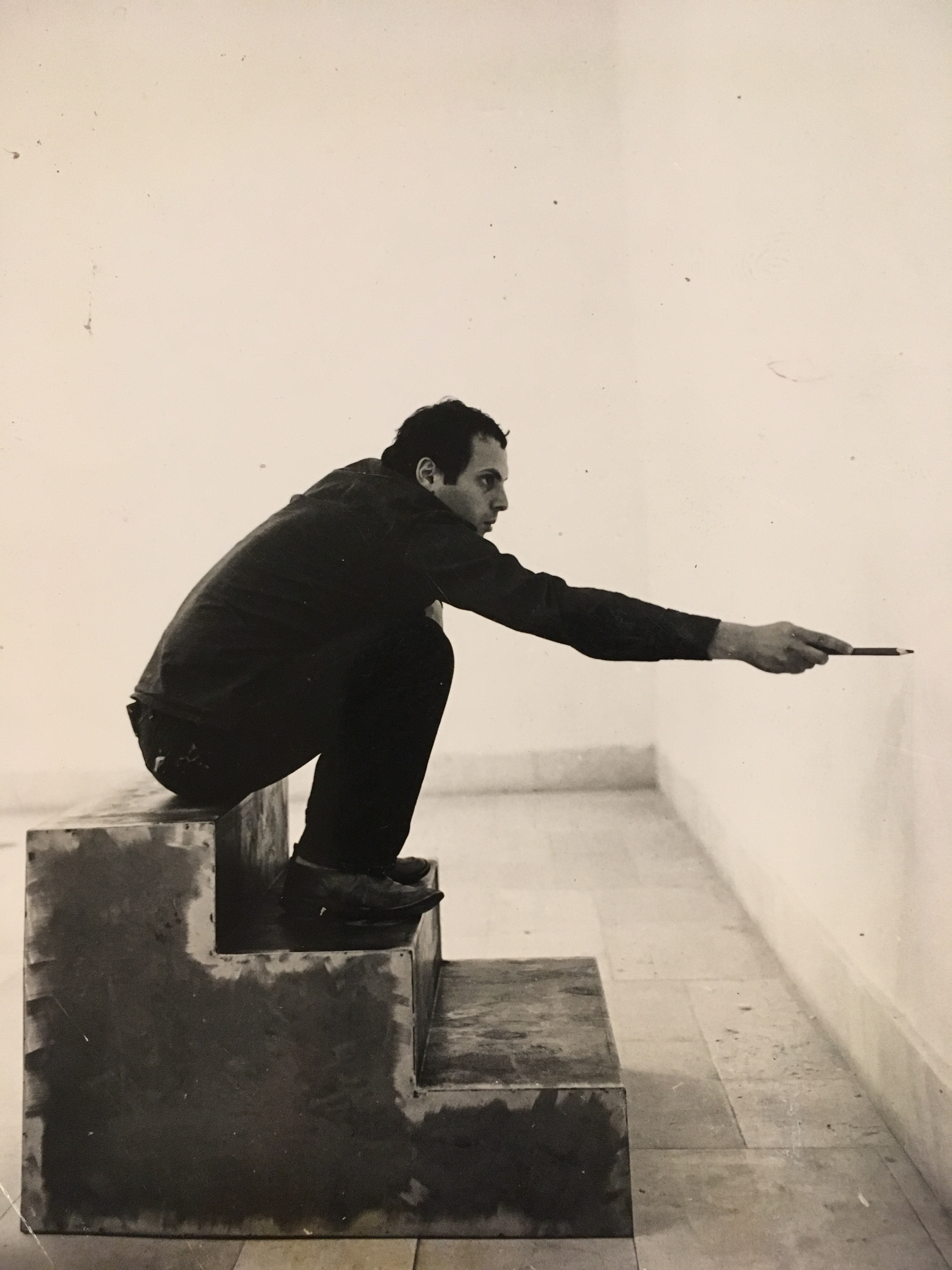

Serge Spitzer (June 29, 1951 – September 9, 2012) was a Romanian-born American artist, known for his site-specific installations, sculpture, photographs and video.

== Biography ==
In 1969–1972, Serge Spitzer studied at the Art Academy in Bucharest, Romania

== Art career ==
Spitzer's work was exhibited internationally in numerous museums and art institutions, among them were Folkwang Museum Essen, 1979; Museum of Modern Art, New York, 1983; Kunstmuseum, Bern, 1984 and 2006; Magasin, Grenoble, 1987; Gemeentemuseum, The Hague, 1992; Kunsthalle and Kunstverein, Düsseldorf, 1993; IVAM Centro Julio Gonzales and Centro del Carme, Valencia, 1994; Henri Moore Institute, Leeds, 1994; Westfälischer Kunstverein, Münster, 1995; Kunsthalle, Bern, 2003; Museum fur Moderne Kunst (MMK), Frankfurt, 2006; Aldrich Museum of Contemporary Art, Ridgefield, Connecticut, 2008; Palais de Tokyo, Paris, 2010 .

Spitzer participated in many international art exhibitions and biennials such as, Documenta VIII, Kassel, 1987; Istanbul Biennial, 1994; Biennale de Lyon, 1997; Kwangju Biennial, 1997; Venice Biennale, 1999, Sydney Biennial, 2010.

He has contributed works to many group and thematic exhibitions curated among others by Harald Szeemann, Rene Block, Rudi Fuchs, Udo Kittelmann, David Elliott, Vicente Todoli, Manfred Schneckenburger, Jurgen Harten, Robert Hopper, Franz Kaiser, Bernhard Fibicher, Stella Rollig, Tilman Osterwald, Heinz Liesbrock, Zdenka Badovinac, and Raimund Stecker.

== Museum collections ==
Spitzer's works are represented in many public and private collections including: Brooklyn Museum, New York; Fogg Art Museum, Cambridge MA; Museum Folkwang, Essen; Haags Gemeentemuseum, The Hague; Kunstmuseum, Bern; IVAM Instituto Valenciano d’Arte Moderno, Valencia; Museum of Contemporary Art, Chicago; Musée d’Art Contemporain, Lyon; Museum für Moderne Kunst (MMK), Frankfurt am Main; Neue Nationalgalerie, Berlin; Staatliche Museen Neue Galerie, Kassel; Staatens Museum for Kunst, Kopenhagen; Museum of Modern Art, New York; Menil Collection, Houston TX; Yale University Art Gallery, New Haven CT.

== Gallery ==
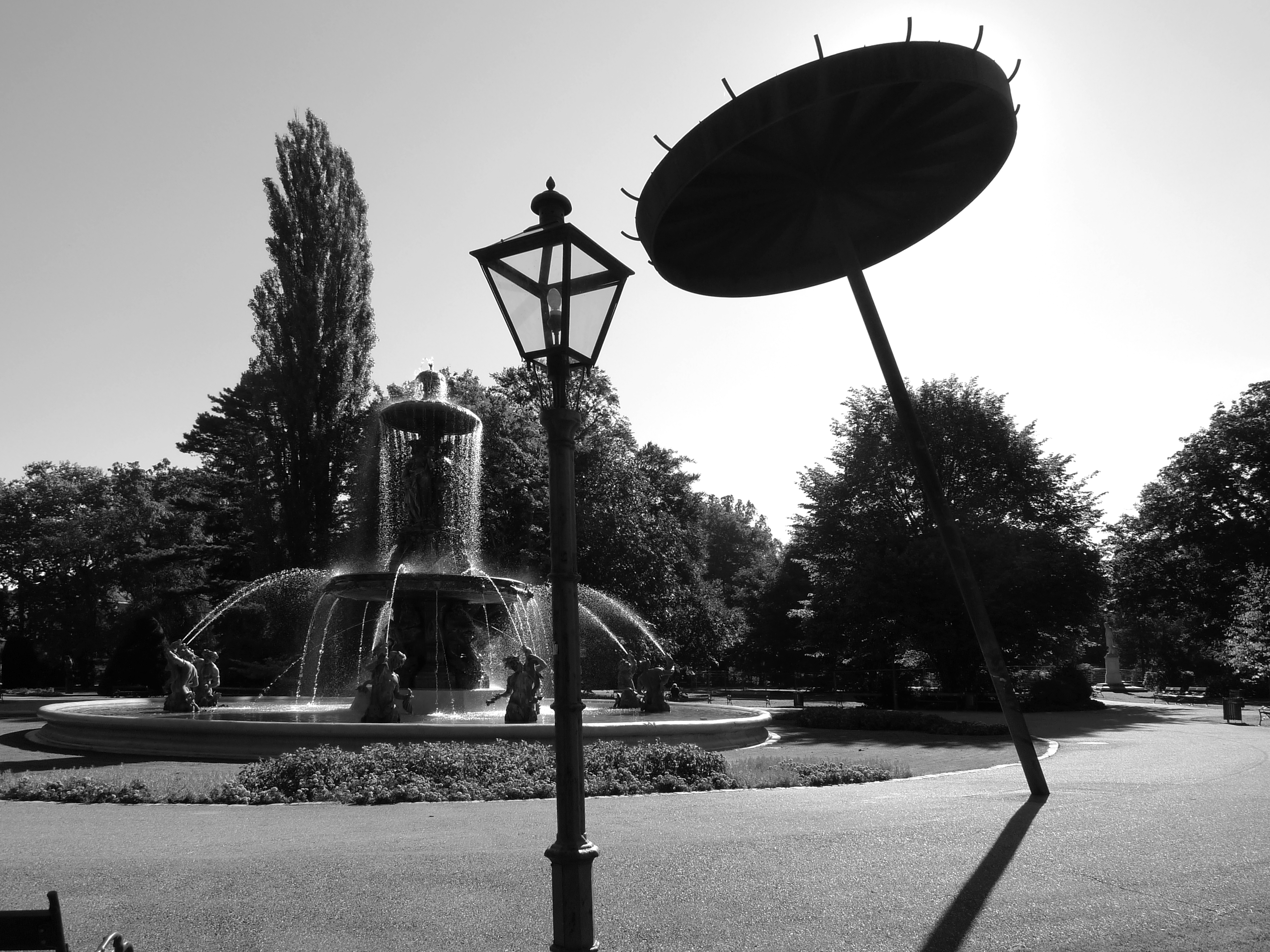
Brunnenwerk ("Rusty Nail"), Graz, Austria

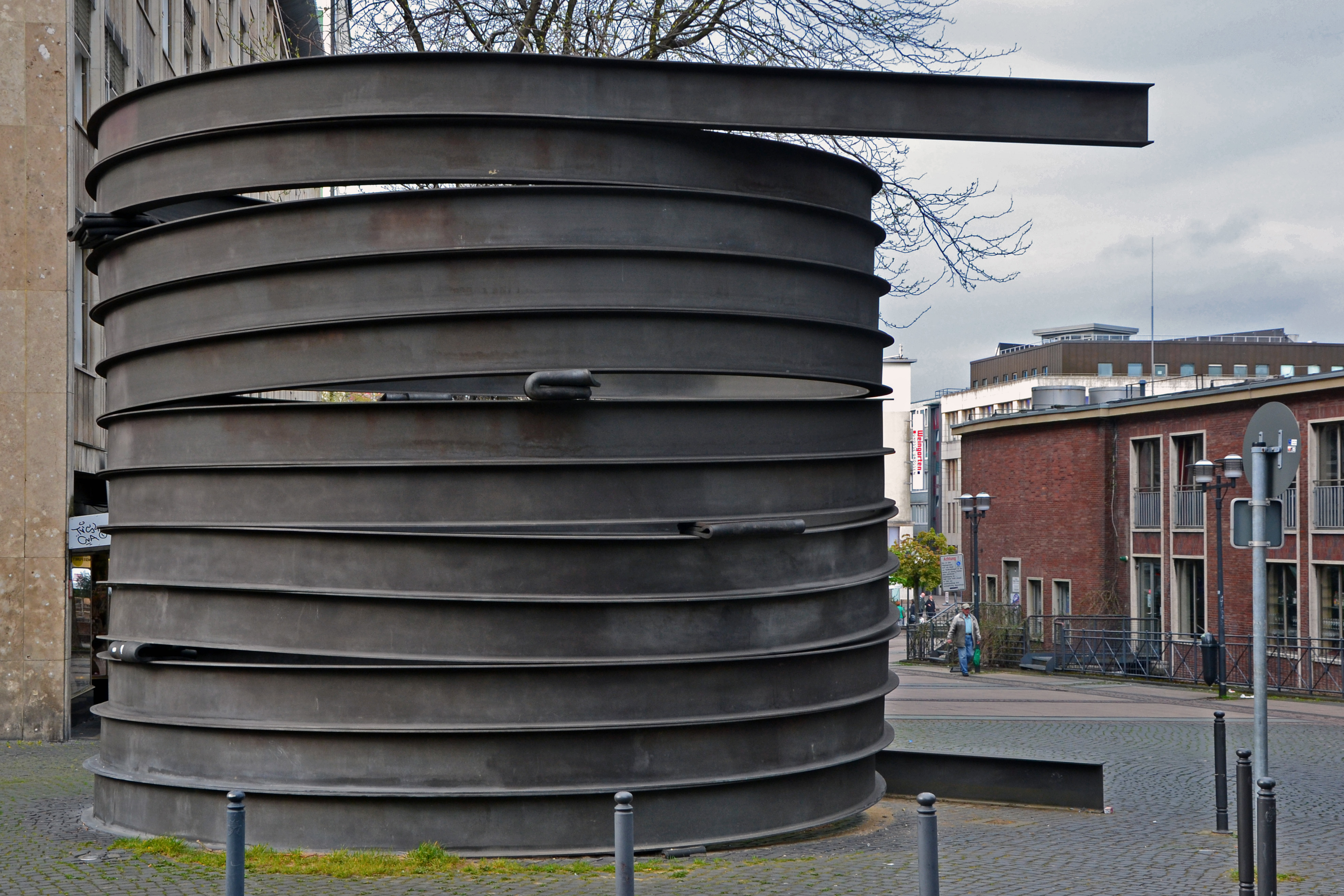
Spiral, Essen, Germany

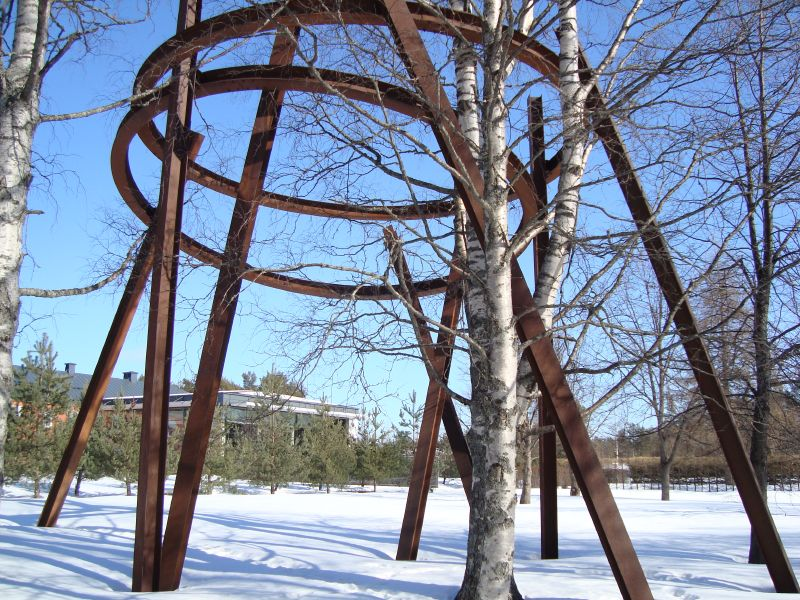
Umeå Prototype, Umeå, Sweden
