= Goethe Plaque of the City of Frankfurt =

German cultural award

Goethe Plaque of the City of Frankfurt (German: Goethe-Plakette der Stadt Frankfurt am Main) is an award conferred since 1932 by Frankfurt, Hesse, Germany and named after Johann Wolfgang von Goethe. The plaque was originally designed by sculptor Harold Winter. The plaque is awarded at irregular intervals to important poets, writers, artists, scientists and other personalities of the cultural life.

== Recipients ==
- 1932 Thomas Mann, Albert Schweitzer, Friedrich Muckermann, Julius Petersen
- 1934 William Butler Yeats
- 1937 Georg Kolbe
- 1938 Leo Frobenius
- 1939 Anton Kippenberg, de:Anton Kippenberg
- 1940 Hans Pfitzner
- 1941 Friedrich Bethge
- 1943 Wilhelm Schäfer
- 1944 Otto Hahn
- 1947 Gustav Mori
- 1947 Franz Schultz
- 1947 Franz Volhard
- 1948 Georg Hartmann
- 1949 André Gide
- 1949 Adolf Grimme
- 1949 Gerhard Marcks
- 1949 José Ortega y Gasset
- 1949 Carl Jacob Burckhardt
- 1949 Friedrich Meinecke
- 1949 Robert M. Hutchins
- 1949 Victor Gollancz
- 1951 Friedrich Witz
- 1951 Richard Merton
- 1951 Alexander Rudolf Hohlfeld
- 1951 Boris Rajewsky
- 1951 Ernst Robert Curtius
- 1951 Friedrich Dessauer
- 1951 Jean Angelloz
- 1951 L.A. Willoughby
- 1952 Bernhard Guttmann
- 1952 John J. McCloy
- 1952 Ludwig Seitz
- 1953 Max Horkheimer
- 1953 Fritz Strich
- 1954 August de Bary
- 1954 Karl Kleist
- 1954 Richard Scheibe
- 1954 Rudolf Alexander Schröder
- 1955 Andreas Bruno Wachsmuth
- 1955 Fritz von Unruh
- 1955 Ferdinand Blum
- 1955 Hanns Wilhelm Eppelsheimer
- 1955 Paul Hindemith
- 1956 Peter Suhrkamp
- 1956 Carl Mennicke
- 1956 Josef Hellauer
- 1956 Paul Tillich
- 1957 Benno Reifenberg
- 1957 Gottfried Bermann Fischer
- 1957 Rudolf Pechel
- 1957 Kasimir Edschmid
- 1957 Helmut Walcha
- 1958 Otto Bartning
- 1958 Friedrich Lehmann
- 1958 Helmut Coing
- 1958 Werner Bock
- 1958 Martin Buber
- 1959 Veronica Wedgwood
- 1959 Jean Schlumberger
- 1959 Herman Nohl
- 1959 Sarvepalli Radhakrishnan
- 1959 Thornton Wilder
- 1959 Yasunari Kawabata
- 1960 Alfred Petersen
- 1960 Arthur Hübscher
- 1960 Franz Böhm
- 1961 Vittorio Klostermann
- 1962 Edgar Salin
- 1963 Fried Lübbecke
- 1963 Karl Winnacker
- 1963 Theodor W. Adorno
- 1964 Harry Buckwitz
- 1965 Carl Orff
- 1966 Heinrich Troeger
- 1966 Marie Luise Kaschnitz
- 1966 Ferdinand Hoff
- 1967 Carl Tesch
- 1967 Werner Bockelmann
- 1967 Wilhelm Schöndube
- 1967 Wilhelm Schäfer
- 1973 Kurt Hessenberg
- 1974 Ljubomir Romansky
- 1974 Waldemar Kramer
- 1976 Albert Richard Mohr
- 1977 Siegfried Unseld
- 1977 Oswald von Nell-Breuning SJ
- 1978 Paul Arnsberg
- 1979 Christoph von Dohnanyi
- 1979 Erich Fromm
- 1979 Wulf Emmo Ankel
- 1980 Rudolf Hirsch
- 1980 Walter Hesselbach
- 1980 Horst Krüger
- 1980 Fuat Sezgin
- 1981 Wilhelm Kempf
- 1981 Sir Georg Solti
- 1982 Leo Löwenthal
- 1982 Bruno Vondenhoff
- 1983 Harald Keller
- 1984 Marcel Reich-Ranicki
- 1986 Alfred Grosser
- 1987 Joachim C. Fest
- 1988 Jörgen Schmidt-Voigt
- 1989 Dorothea Loehr
- 1989 Alfred Schmidt
- 1989 Dolf Sternberger
- 1990 Eva Demski
- 1990 Hilmar Hoffmann
- 1991 Albert Mangelsdorff
- 1992 Iring Fetscher
- 1993 Willi Ziegler
- 1994 Liesel Christ
- 1994 Ludwig von Friedeburg
- 1994 Walter Weisbecker
- 1995 Emil Mangelsdorff
- 1995 Heinrich Schirmbeck
- 1995 Wolfram Schütte
- 1996 Christiane Nüsslein-Volhard
- 1996 Walter Boehlich
- 1997 Walter H. Pehle
- 1997 Hans-Dieter Resch
- 1998 Anja Lundholm
- 1998 Christoph Vitali
- 1998 Peter Weiermair
- 1999 Arno Lustiger
- 1999 Johann Philipp von Bethmann
- 2000 Karl Dedecius
- 2000 Michael Gotthelf
- 2001 Ernst Klee
- 2001 Hans-Wolfgang Pfeifer
- 2002 Horst-Eberhard Richter
- 2002 Peter Eschberg
- 2002 Heiner Goebbels
- 2002 Oswald Mathias Ungers
- 2003 Chlodwig Poth
- 2003 Christa von Schnitzler
- 2003 Franz Mon
- 2003 Albert Speer
- 2003 Jean-Christophe Ammann
- 2004 Ferry Ahrlé
- 2004 Monika Schoeller
- 2005 Henriette Kramer
- 2005 Gerhard R. Koch
- 2006 Eliahu Inbal
- 2006 Peter Iden
- 2007 Carmen Renate Köper
- 2007 Thomas Bayrle
- 2008 E. R. Nele
- 2008 Frank Wolff
- 2009 Peter Kurzeck
- 2009 Rosemarie Fendel
- 2010 Klaus Reichert
- 2011 Dieter Buroch
- 2011 Hans-Klaus Jungheinrich
- 2012 Felix Mussil
- 2012 Mischka Popp and Thomas Bergmann
- 2013 Paulus Böhmer
- 2013 Peter Cahn
- 2014 Hans Traxler
- 2014 Thomas Gebauer
- 2014 Wilhelm Genazino
- 2015 Martin Mosebach
- 2015 Sven Väth
- 2016 Bettina von Bethmann
- 2016 Tobias Rehberger
- 2017 Moses Pelham
- 2017 Claus Helmer
- 2018 Max Weinberg
- 2019 Bodo Kirchhoff
- 2019 Effi B. Rolfs
- 2019 Max Hollein
- 2020 Silke Scheuermann
- 2020 Burkard Schliessmann
- 2021 Hans Zimmer
- 2021 Sandra Mann
- 2022 Volker Mosbrugger
- 2022 Sabine Fischmann
- 2023 Michel Friedman
- 2024 Margareta Dillinger
- 2024 Bernd Loebe
- 2025 Anne Bohnenkamp-Renken
- 2025 Rainer Forst
- 2026 Thomas Jahn
