= Randi Malkin Steinberger =

American photographer (born 1960)

Randi Malkin Steinberger (born 1960) is an American photographer, documentary filmmaker, and author.

Steinberger collaborated with renowned artist Alighiero Boetti on two books: Accanto al Pantheon, published by Prearo Editions in Milan, and Boetti by Afghan People: Peshawar, Pakistan, 1990, published by RAM Publications & Distribution.

== Early life and education ==
A Chicago native, Steinberger studied art history and photography in Florence, where she worked as a fine art photographer and later produced artists’ books that are now part of the permanent collections of New York's Museum of Modern Art and The Whitney Museum, The Art Institute of Chicago and Museum of Contemporary Art, Chicago.

== Work ==
Steinberger became acquainted with Boetti in Italy and commuted between Rome and Florence to collaborate with him. Together they produced the book, Accanto al Pantheon, published by Prearo Editions in Milan. Their second collaboration brought Steinberger to the Afghan refugee camps outside Peshawar, Pakistan, where she documented the production of Boetti's embroidered work. In September 2011 RAM Publications & Distribution released a book of photographs taken there with essays in English and Italian entitled, Boetti by Afghan People: Peshawar, Pakistan, 1990. "Through Steinberger's perceptive eye and illuminating words we see and feel the poignancy of the artist and the artisans who together created one of contemporary art's most exquisite and powerful bodies of work," according to Elsa Longhauser, executive director of the Santa Monica Museum of Art. A suite of these photographs were shown at the Gladstone Gallery in New York in 2010 as part of the exhibition Alighiero e Boetti: Mappe.

Boetti by Afghan People: Peshawar, Pakistan, 1990, served as the companion to an Boetti exhibition organized by the Fowler Museum at UCLA, in association with Fondazione Azzurra, and complements an exhibition at the Los Angeles Museum of Contemporary Art that featured an iconic Boetti Mappa. Also a major Boetti retrospective by New York's The Museum of Modern Art, the Tate Modern in London, and Museo Reina Sofia in Madrid, opened in October 2011 and traveled throughout 2013.

Steinberger's documentary films include the insightful portrait of the modern traveler, Holi-days, which was shot in Jerusalem, Florence and Las Vegas, and aired on the Sundance Channel.

In No Circus, her book of photographs, tented houses became sculptural abstractions and enigmatic monuments inserted into suburban Los Angeles. Steinberger's photographs in No Circus are accompanied by an essay by D. J. Waldie. It ranges from the mating habits of termites to the chemistry of fumigation to the phenomenology of a shrouded house. “Everyone has looked twice at these big top monoliths,” artist Miranda July points out, “but only Steinberger has looked again and again, transforming termite tents in to public art with her gorgeous and obsessive eye.”

In 2019, Steinberger co-chaired the search committee that selected Anne Ellegood as director of the Institute of Contemporary Art, Los Angeles.

== Art market ==
Randi Malkin Steinberger is represented by the Sears-Peyton Gallery in New York and Los Angeles.

== Publications ==
- ABCDEFGHIJKLMNOPQRSTUVWXYZ (1986). Series of three artists' books made with Luca Pancrazzi.
- In 6 Minutes (1987). A-Z Editions.
- The Key (1987). Artists’ book
- Boetti by Afghan People: Peshawar, Pakistan, 1990, (2011). RAM Publications.
- Order and Disorder: Alighiero Boetti by Afghan Women (2012). Fowler Museum at UCLA.
- Congo Mission Box (2015). Book Machine.
- No Circus (2016). Damiani.
