= Peter Roehr =

German Pop Art minimalist artist

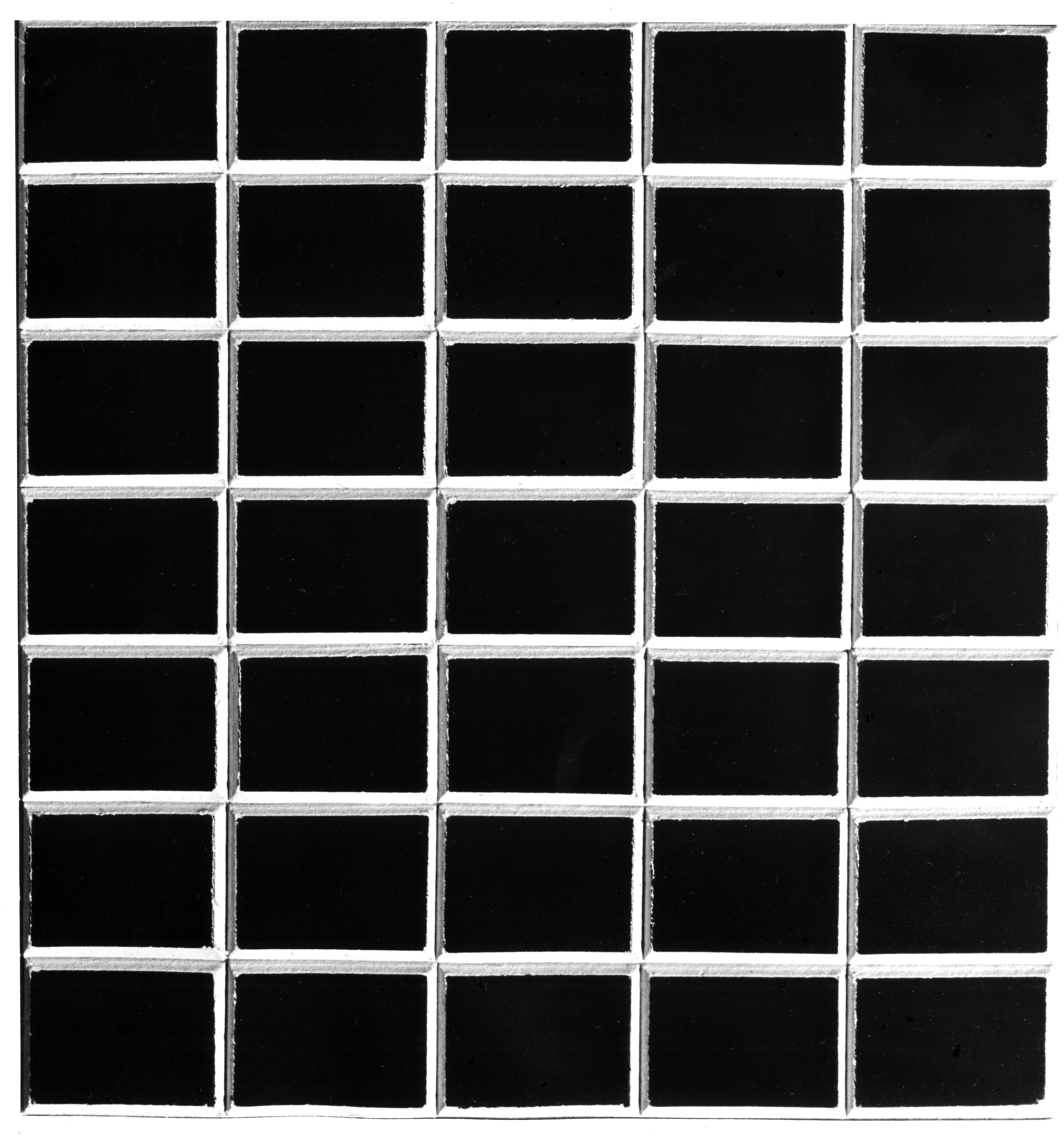
Untitled (No. 33-6-66), 1966, board on wood, 20,5 x 20 cm, Collection Paul Maenz / picture: Heinz Thate 10/1970

Peter Roehr (1 September 1944 in Lauenburg in Pommern – 15 August 1968 in Frankfurt am Main) was a German Pop Art minimalist artist.

== Life ==
Roehr was the only child of Kurt and Eleonora Röhr. After their divorce the mother moved with her child first to Leipzig and then to Frankfurt am Main. After visiting the Volksschule he completed an apprenticeship as producer for electronic signage in Frankfurt am Main. Afterward he studied from 1962 to 1966 at the Werkkunstschule (today RheinMain University of Applied Sciences) in Wiesbaden. He studied in the class of Vincent Weber and graduated in 1966. His early works were made in 1962 and 1963. In 1964 Roehr met Paul Maenz, who later became an important art dealer. Roehr was in close contact with the artists Charlotte Posenenske and Thomas Bayrle, who lived in Frankfurt as well.

In May 1967 Roehr and Paul Maenz organized in the Studio Galerie of the Goethe University Frankfurt a groundbreaking exhibition entitled Serielle Formationen where works by Carl Andre, Jan Dibbets, Hans Haacke, Donald Judd, Piero Manzoni and Jan Schoonhoven were shown.

Peter Roehr died in 1968 at the age of 23 from cancer.

== Work ==
During a period of five years Roehr produced more than 600 works. They can be categorized in ten groups. Each group is defined by the material the regarded work is made of. Roehrs Oeuvre can be labelled as conceptual art because he aligned each work to the conception of the unvaried repetition.

== Montages ==
His most famous work, Film-Montages I-III (1965), was edited on 16mm film (and would later be digitized) from fragments of TV commercials to create an aesthetic film and illustrating his concept of a time structure related to principles of serial music. He would do the same thing with radio adverts on his 1966 piece Tonmontagen (Sound Montages).

== Legacy ==
Video artist William E. Jones paid tribute with his 2006 piece Film Montages (for Peter Roehr) featuring fragments from pre-AIDS gay porn films.

== Quotations ==
"I alter material by organizing it unchanged. Each work is an organized area of identical elements. Neither successive nor additive, there is no result or sum." (1964)

"I assemble available things of the same kind together. These might, for example, be: objects, photographs, freestanding forms such as letters, texts, tones and sounds, film-material, etc. The results I call montages" (1965)

== Exhibitions (selection) ==
- 1965: Adam Seide, Frankfurt am Main, Abendausstellung II (auch 1967)
- 1967: Galerie Dorothea Loehr, Frankfurt am Main
- 1971: Morsbroich Museum, Leverkusen
- 1971: Galerie Paul Maenz, Cologne (also in 1972, 1973, 1974, 1976, 1981, 1985, 1988)
- 1972: Galleria Sperone, Turin; documenta 5, Kassel
- 1977: Kunsthalle Tübingen; documenta 6, Kassel
- 1977: Van Abbemuseum, Eindhoven; Frankfurter Kunstverein, Frankfurt am Main; Kunsthalle Tübingen
- 1978: Museum of Modern Art, Oxford
- 2000: Neues Museum Weimar, Weimar
- 2004: Museum für Moderne Kunst, Frankfurt am Main
- 2009: Städel Museum and Museum für Moderne Kunst, Frankfurt am Main: Peter Roehr. Werke aus Frankfurter Sammlungen
- 2010: Haus Konstruktiv, Zürich: Visionäre Sammlung Vol.12: Peter Roehr
- 2012: Kunsthaus Wiesbaden: dasselbe anders / immer dasselbe: Charlotte Posenenske und Peter Roehr

== See also ==
- Andy Warhol
- Vaporwave - similar in content
- Criticism of capitalism
- Minimalist film
- Roy Lichtenstein
