= Fritz Strich =

Swiss-German literature historian

Fritz Strich (13 December 1882 – 15 August 1963) was a Swiss-German literature historian.

== Life ==
Born in Königsberg, Strich was a student of Franz Muncker and became a lecturer at the Ludwig-Maximilians-Universität München in 1910. In 1915 he was appointed extraordinary professor in Munich and in 1929 professor at the University of Bern. In this way he escaped the persecution of Jews in the German Reich. In 1941 Strich was awarded the Swiss nationality and worked as a professor until his emeritus in 1953.

Strich received the Goethe Medal for Art and Science in 1932, the Berner Literaturpreis in 1951 and the Goethe Plaque of the City of Frankfurt in 1953. Strich was a member of the German Academy for Language and Poetry.

Strich's estate in the Burgerbibliothek Bern documents "above all [his] scientific work".

Strich died in Bern at the age of 80.

== Publications ==
- Franz Grillparzers Ästhetik, Berlin 1905; Reprint: Gerstenberg, Hildesheim 1977, ISBN 3-8067-0619-0
- Die Mythologie in der deutschen Literatur. Von Klopstock bis Wagner, Halle 1910; Reprint: Francke, Bern 1970
- Deutsche Klassik und Romantik oder Vollendung und Unendlichkeit. Ein Vergleich. Meyer & Jessen, Munich 1922; 5. A. Francke, Bern 1962
- Dichtung und Zivilisation. Meyer & Jessen, Munich 1928
- Schiller. Sein Leben und sein Werk. Deutsche Buch-Gemeinschaft, Berlin 1928
- Der Dichter und die Zeit. Eine Sammlung von Reden und Vorträgen. Francke, Bern 1947
- Goethe und die Weltliteratur. Francke, Bern 1946; 2. verb. A. ebd. 1957
- Kunst und Leben. Vorträge und Abhandlungen zur deutschen Literatur. Francke, Bern 1960
- Goethes Faust. Francke, Bern 1964
