= Christa von Schnitzler =

German sculptor (1922–2003)

Christa von Schnitzler (12 July 1922 – 28 June 2003) was a German sculptor.

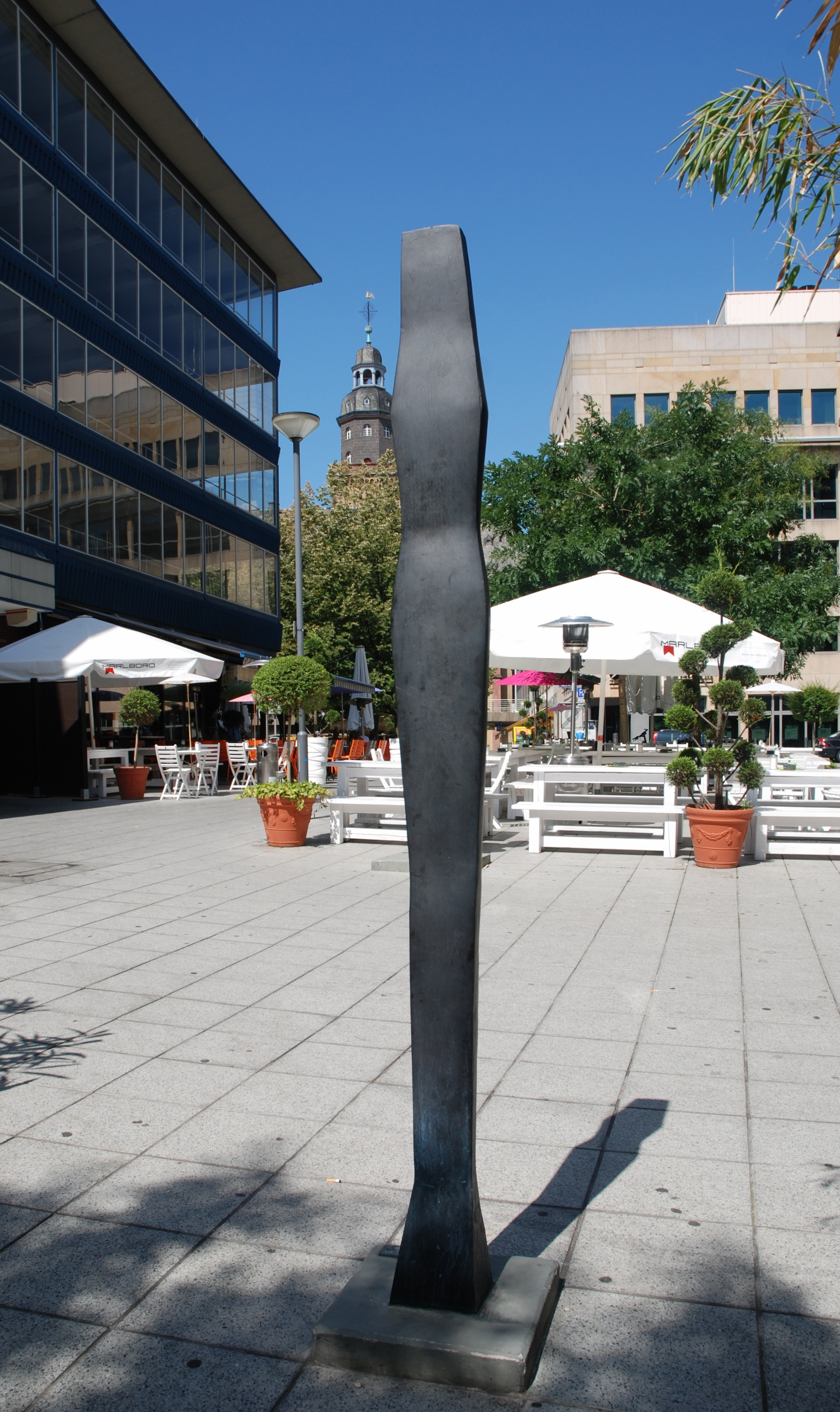
Schnitzler's "Grosse Stehende", Frankfurt am Main

== Early life and education ==
Christa von Schnitzler was born in Cologne in 1922. She was a daughter of the banker Werner Arthur von Schnitzler and his wife Eleonore Elise Emma, born von Görschen. She lived alternately in France, Germany and England between 1928 and 1939, and then in Frankfurt am Main from 1941 to 1947.

She was accepted into Toni Stadler's sculpture class at the Städelschule and followed Stadler in 1947 to the Academy of Fine Arts in Munich, where she completed her studies in sculpture in 1952. For this reason Schnitzler is considered to be the product of the School of Munich.

In 1953 von Schnitzler married Michael Croissant, who from 1948 also studied in the sculpture class with Stradler.

== Career ==
Von Schnitzler began with figurative sculptures in the 1950s, which was followed by an informal work phase from the late 1950s to the early 1960s. Von Schnitzler had her first solo exhibition in 1958 at the Kölnischer Kunstverein. From around 1962 to 1965 she created a number of torsos and fragments. In 1965 she received the Burda Prize, became a member of the Association of German Artists and the New Group in Munich. The following year she returned along with her husband, the sculptor Michael Croissant, back to Frankfurt am Main as Croissant had accepted a professorship at the Städelschule.

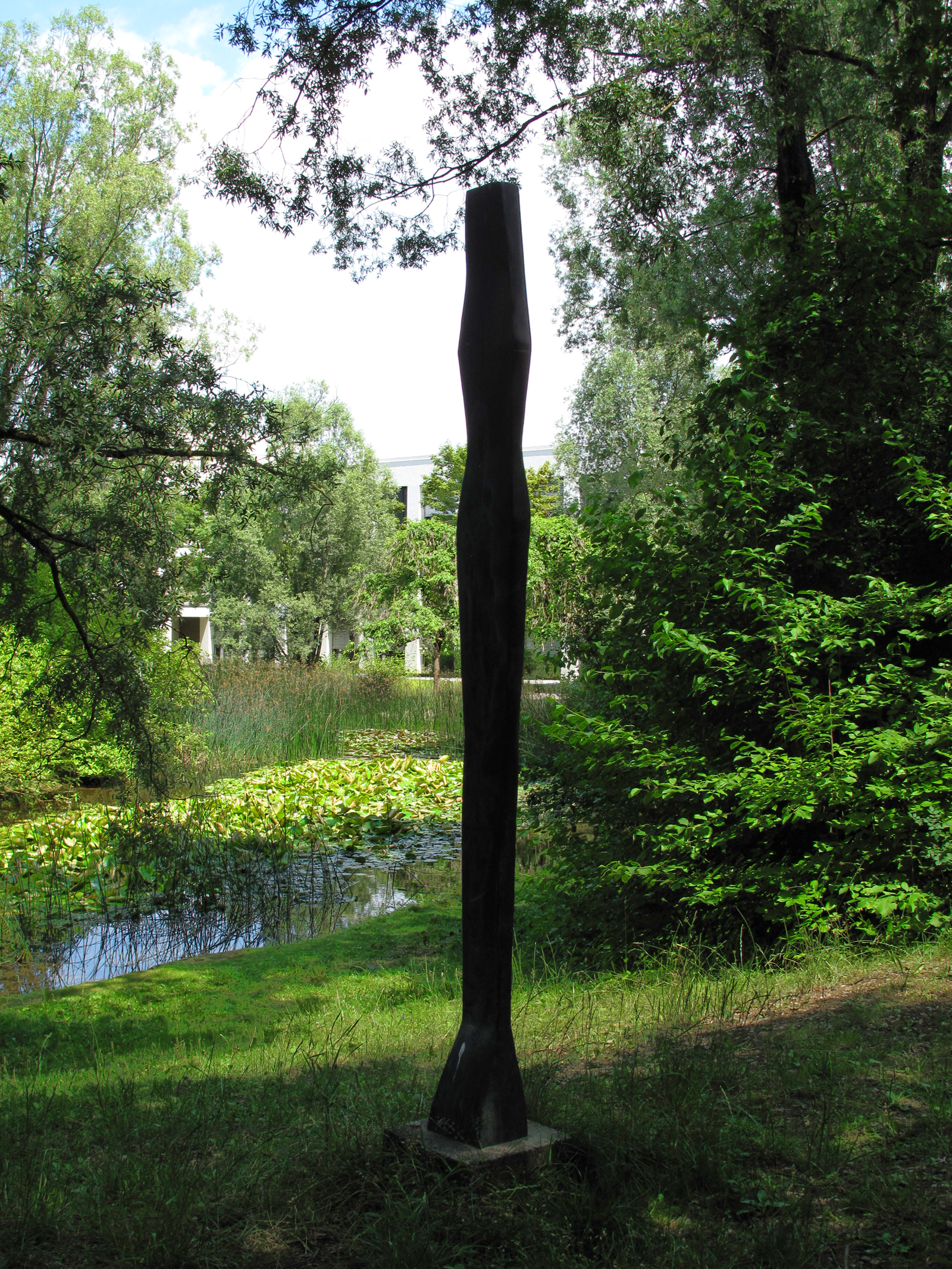
"Madchen", University of Augsburg

From the late 1960s onwards, the very slender, polished wooden steles were created, some of which she had cast in bronze.

In 1984, von Schnitzler met the artist Gisela Nietmann, with whom she then worked in a joint studio in Frankfurt am Main.

Christa von Schnitzler died on 28 June 2003 in Frankrunt am Main. The same year she was posthumously awarded Goethe Plaque of the City of Frankfurt.

== Works (selection) ==
- 1978 tall standing. Bronze, Frankfurt am Main, erected in 1980
- 1983 “Girl” stele. Bronze, south bank of the university pond, University of Augsburg

== Solo exhibitions (selection) ==
- 1958: Kölnischer Kunstverein
- 1966: Wilhelm Hack Museum Ludwigshafen
- 1967: Museum Wiesbaden
- 1971: Oldenburg Castle
- 1993: Carmelite Monastery, Frankfurt am Main (together with Gisela Nietmann)
- 1996: Museum Wiesbaden (together with Dorothee von Windheim; on the occasion of the award of the Maria Sybilla Merian Prize to Dorothee von Windheim and the honorary prize to Christa von Schnitzler)
- 2001: Art Association Villa Wessel, Iserlohn

== Awards ==
- 1965: Burda Prize
- 1996: Honorary Prize of the Merian Prize, Museum Wiesbaden
- 2003: Goethe Plaque of the City of Frankfurt (posthumous)
