= Danica Dakić =

Bosnian artist and university professor

Danica Dakić (born 1962) in Sarajevo) is a Bosnian artist and university professor. She works primarily with video art, installation and photography. Her works have been widely exhibited, including at documenta 12 (2007) and at the 58th Venice Biennale (2019), where she represented Bosnia and Herzegovina. Dakić lives and works in Düsseldorf, Weimar, and Sarajevo.

== Life and education ==
Danica Dakić was born in 1962 in Sarajevo and grew up in Yugoslavia. She studied from 1981 to 1985 at the Sarajevo Academy of Arts and then moved to the University of Arts in Belgrade, where she continued her studies until 1988 and completed her master's degree in painting. In 1988 she left Yugoslavia and went to Germany, where she studied from 1988 to 1990 at the Kunstakademie Düsseldorf in the class of Nam June Paik.

She spent the Bosnian war in Germany and in 1997 she returned to Sarajevo for the first time.

== Work ==
Dakić works across all media – from drawing to photography, video and sound works, film, performances, and sculptural objects. Employing performative and participatory processes, she creates images and voices that interrogate ever-changing social, political, and cultural contexts also for their utopian potential. In her works she also incorporates personal factors. Her working method is characterised by her longstanding collaboration with the photographer Egbert Trogemann, the composer Bojan Vuletić, and the producer Amra Bakšić Čamo. Her projects are based on often lengthy research and production processes, which make intensive collaboration with the protagonists in her works indispensable. Starting out from a particular architecture, a historical place, or an (art) historical image, she creates stages with the participants on which individual worlds of images and narratives are created, beyond political, social, or economic classifications and codifications.

The Bosnian War and the Siege of Sarajevo had a profound influence on her artistic development and her early work. Beginning in 1997, in collaboration with the Sarajevo Center for Contemporary Art (SCCA), she developed works in Sarajevo's urban spaces that engaged with the upheavals of a post-war society and that uncover processes of language development: In the video projection MADAME X (1997) she positioned herself for the first time in her hometown after all the changes caused by the war. In an alleyway in Sarajevo, her speaking mouth could be seen, but no sounds were heard. In her work WITNESS (1998), she placed a video and sound intervention on the empty pedestal of the monument to the writer Ivo Andrić in Sarajevo's city park, to question the rewriting of history in times of great upheavals using the example of the missing bust of the Nobel Prize winner.

== Collections ==
- Tate Modern, London
- Centre Georges-Pompidou, Paris
- Museum of Contemporary Art of Bordeaux
- MACBA - Museu d'Art Contemporani de Barcelona

== Exhibitions ==
=== Selected solo exhibitions ===
- 2002: Prayer, Kunstverein Ulm.
- 2005: Role Taking, Role Making, Kulturzentrum Sinsteden, Rhein-Kreis Neuss
- 2008: Triptychon. Mala Galerija, Museum of Modern Art, Ljubljana
- 2009: Danica Dakić, Kunsthalle Düsseldorf
- 2010: Danica Dakić. Role-Taking, Role-Making, Generali Foundation, Vienna
- 2011: Danica Dakić, Hammer Museum, Los Angeles
- 2013: Danica Dakić: Safe Frame, Museum für Moderne Kunst Frankfurt
- 2017: Danica Dakić – Missing Sculpture, Lehmbruck Museum, Duisburg
- 2019: Zenica Trilogy, Bosnia and Herzegovina Pavilion at the 58th Biennale di Venezia
- 2019/2020: Zenica Trilogie, Bauhaus Museum Weimar

=== Selected group exhibitions ===
- 1999: La casa, il corpo, il cuore – Konstruktion der Identitäten, MUMOK, Vienna.
- 2003: In den Schluchten des Balkan, Kunsthalle Fridericianum, Kassel.
  - 2005: Skulptur Biennale Münsterland, Borken.
- 2007: Talking Pictures, K21 Kunstsammlung NRW, Düsseldorf.
- 2007: Das ABC der Bilder, Pergamonmuseum, Berlin.

== Publications ==
- Danica Dakić. With texts from Boris Buden, Söke Dinkla, Ronja Friedrichs, Peter Gorschlüter, Sabine Maria Schmidt, Verlag für Moderne Kunst, 2018. ISBN 978-3-903228-44-3
- Danica Dakić: Emily, Gandy gallery 2011.
- Danica Dakić. With texts from Horst Bredekamp, Tom Holert, Sabine Folie, Ulrike Groos, Tihomir Milovac, Verlag der Buchhandlung Walther Koenig, 2009. ISBN 978-3-86560-679-2
- Danica Dakić: Casa del Lago, Kunsthaus Langenthal, 2009. ISBN 978-3-905817-15-7
- Danica Dakić: Role-Taking, Role-Making, Verlag für moderne Kunst, Düsseldorf 2005. ISBN 3-938821-26-4
- Danica Dakić: Voices and Images, Revolver, Frankfurt am Main, 2004. ISBN 3-86588-016-9
- Danica Dakić: Zenica Trilogy, exhibition catalogue, The Pavilion of Bosnia and Herzegovina at the 58th International Art Exhibition – La Biennale di Venezia, 2019.
