= Museum für Moderne Kunst =

Art museum in Frankfurt, Germany

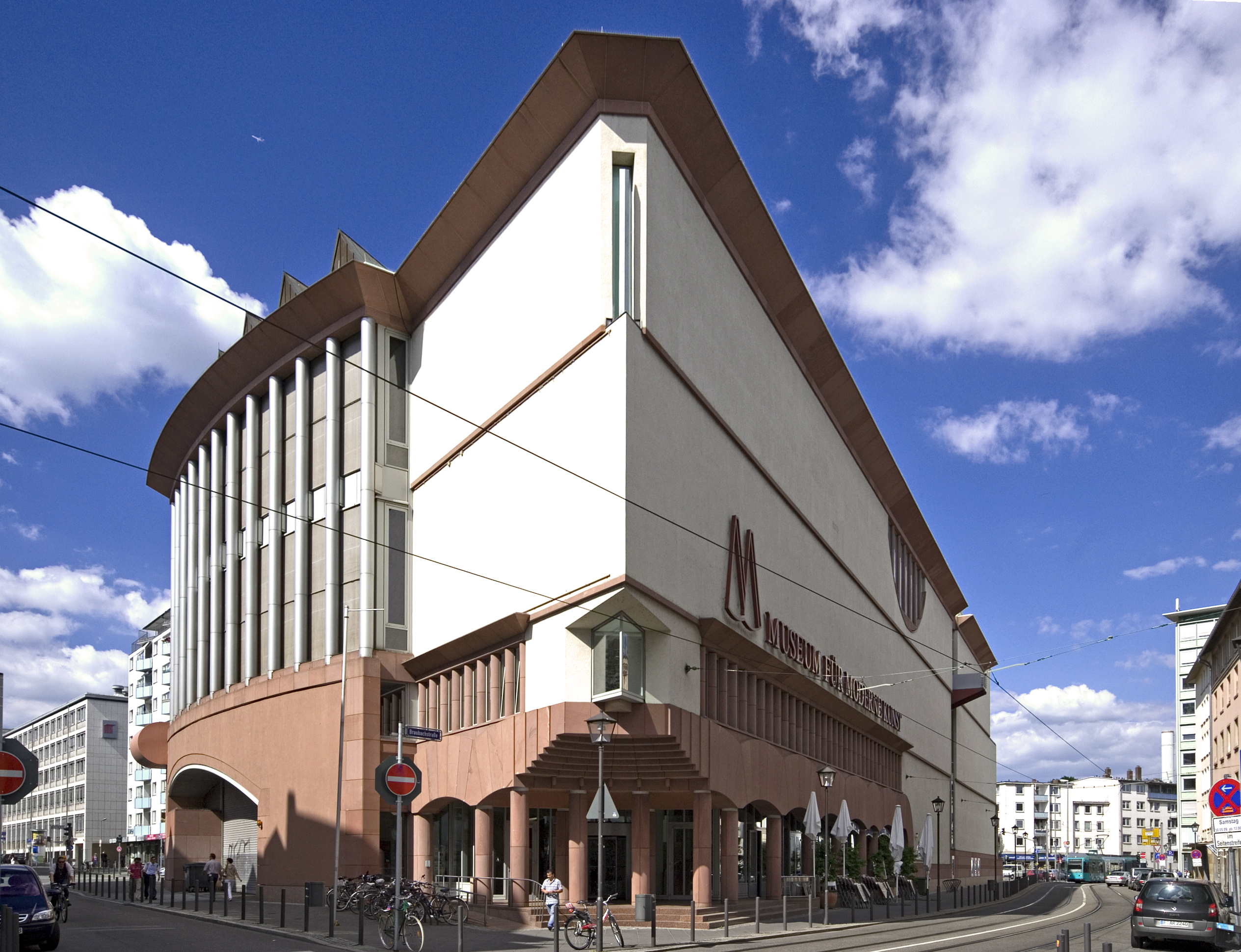
- Museum für Moderne Kunst, main entrance, in 2009
- Established: 1981
- Location: Museumsufer, Altstadt, Frankfurt, Germany
- Coordinates: 50°06′42″N 08°41′05″E
- Type: Art museum
- Key holdings: Joseph Beuys, Andy Warhol, Roy Lichtenstein, Claes Oldenburg
- Collections: Modern art
- Collection size: 4,500
- Visitors: 92,696 (2018)
- Director: Susanne Pfeffer
- Architect: Hans Hollein
- Public transit access: Dom/Römer (3 min); Konstablerwache; 11, 12, 14 Römer/Paulskirche (3 min)
- Website: www.mmk.art

The Museum für Moderne Kunst (Museum of Modern Art), or short MMK, in Frankfurt, was founded in 1981 and opened to the public 6 June 1991. The museum was designed by the Viennese architect Hans Hollein. It is part of Frankfurt's Museumsufer (Museum Riverbank). Because of its triangular shape, the MMK is popularly called the Tortenstück ("piece of cake"). Since 2018, Susanne Pfeffer has been director of the MMK.

== History ==
The newest of Frankfurt's museums was founded in 1981. The idea to set up a museum for modern art in Frankfurt came from Peter Iden, an influential theatre and art critic at the Frankfurter Rundschau and founding director of the museum (1978–1987). With the Mayor Walter Wallmann (CDU) and the Head of the Cultural department Hilmar Hoffmann (SPD) Iden found political advocates for his project. In 1989, the Swiss art historian and curator Jean-Christophe Ammann moved from the Kunsthalle Basel to Frankfurt am Main and opened the new Museum für Moderne Kunst (MMK) Frankfurt am Main there on 6 June 1991. With a new exhibition model, the Change of Scene, which took place a total of 20 times with the help of private sponsors (Change of Scene I, 1992 until Change of Scene XX, 2001–02), the new museum gained international renown. At the change of scene exhibitions, the inventory of the museum was rearranged every six months and enriched with new additions, loans and special exhibitions.

In 1983, Hollein won the competition for the Museum für Moderne Kunst; three years earlier, his proposal for the city's Museum für angewandte Kunst had finished a close second behind Richard Meier's prize-winning design. The ground-breaking was delayed until 1987, and the new museum was eventually built at a cost of about $38 million. It opened in 1991.

The MMK Zollamt is a satellite exhibition site that since 1999 has belonged to the MMK and is located in a building directly opposite the museum that once was home to the City of Frankfurt's Main Customs Office. The building has been completely modernised and artistic positions by younger artists or "unknowns" have been presented here regularly since 2007 with the support of Jürgen Ponto-Stiftung.

== Architecture ==
Hollein molded a building to the three-sided space, so that the large rooms at the narrow end are wedge-shaped, producing 3,500 m^{2} (38,000 ft^{2}) of exhibition space. The height of the three-storey building is adapted to the surroundings and is characterised by the "triangular shape" and facade design. The building houses three main levels for exhibitions and an administration area on the mezzanine, which is located above the entrance area and the cafeteria. The MMK library and archive are also located in this area. The entire area of the museum has a basement. There are workshops, depots and a lecture hall.

== Collection ==
The core of the museum is the legacy of German collector Karl Ströher with 87 works of Pop art and Minimalism. The manufacturer Ströher had originally bequeathed to his native city of Darmstadt on condition that a museum be built to house them. When funds for the project were not approved, Ströher's heirs sold the choice ensemble to Frankfurt and donated the painting "Yellow and Green Brushstrokes" by Roy Lichtenstein to the museum as a gift. Major artists since the 1950s from the Ströher Collection displayed, including Jasper Johns, Robert Rauschenberg, Carl Andre, John Chamberlain, Dan Flavin, Donald Judd, Roy Lichtenstein, Walter de Maria, Robert Morris, Claes Oldenburg, James Rosenquist, Frank Stella, Cy Twombly, Andy Warhol, Tom Wesselman and George Segal, with his Jazz Combo. Between 1981 and 1987, the museum's co-founder Peter Iden expanded the collection by adding works from the seventies and eighties. Later parts of the collection have been amassed by the museum's first director, Jean-Christophe Ammann. In 2006 the Museum für Moderne Kunst, along with the Kunstmuseum Liechtenstein and the Kunstmuseum St. Gallen, acquired the private collection of Cologne art dealer Rolf Ricke, comprising works by Richard Artschwager, Bill Bollinger, Donald Judd, Gary Kuehn, und Steven Parrino. Today, the permanent collection includes over 4,500 works of international art, ranging from the 1960s to the present.

== Locations ==
- Museum, Domstraße 10 (MUSEUM ^{MMK} FÜR MODERNE KUNST)
- Taunusturm, Taunustor 1 (TOWER^{MMK})
- Zollamt, Domstraße 3 (ZOLLAMT^{MMK})

== Exhibitions ==
- 1985: Bilder für Frankfurt. Sammlung Museum für Moderne Kunst im Deutschen Architekturmuseum, Frankfurt
- 1987: Dalla Pop Art Americana alla nuova figurazione. Museum für Moderne Kunst / Padiglione d'arte contemporanea, Milano
- 1991: Opening Exhibition Museum für Moderne Kunst Frankfurt, 6 June 1991
- 1991: Carl Andre: Extraneous Roots
- 1994: Das Museum für Moderne Kunst und die Sammlung Ströher
- 1997: Views from Abroad: European Perspectives on American Art
- 1997: Thomas Bayrle: TassenTassen 1967–1997
- 1997: Alex Katz: Smiles
- 1998: Alighiero Boetti: Die Welt zur Welt bringen / Mettere al Mondo il Mondo
- 1999: Bill Viola: A 25 Year Survey Exhibition – Werke aus 25 Jahren
- 1999: Dan Flavin: Two Primary Series and one Secondary, Projektraum MMK im Alten Hauptzollamt
- 2000: Eric Fischl: Works from the 1980s & Travel of Romance
- 2000: Screenings 01 – 10: Filme, Videos und Videoinstallationen, Projektraum MMK im Alten Hauptzollamt
- 2001: Lucian Freud: Naked Portraits
- 2001: Jeff Wall: Figures and Places
- 2002: Hans Peter Feldmann: Kinderzimmer
- 2002: Das Museum, die Sammlung, der Direktor und seine Liebschaften
- 2002: Martin Boyce: Dornbracht Installation Projects
- 2003: Das lebendige Museum
- 2003: Rosemarie Trockel: Das Kinderzimmer
- 2004: Teresa Margolles: Muerte sin fin
- 2004: Elaine Sturtevant: The Brutal Truth
- 2005: Whats New, Pussycat?
- 2005: Spinnwebzeit: Die ebay-Vernetzung
- 2006: Barbara Klemm: 14 Tage China im Jahre 1985
- 2006: Thomas Bayrle: 40 Years Chinese Rock'n'Roll
- 2006: Thomas Demand: Klause
- 2006: Humanism in China. Ein fotografisches Porträt
- 2006: Serge Spitzer und Ai Weiwei: Territorial
- 2006: Andreas Slominski: Roter Sand und ein gefundenes Glück
- 2007: Maurizio Cattelan
- 2007: Das Kapital. Blue Chips & Masterpieces
- 2007: Verwendungsnachweis. Stipendiaten der Jürgen Ponto-Stiftung 2003 – 2006
- 2007: Taryn Simon: An American Index of the Hidden and Unfamiliar
- 2007: Frank Moritz: Menschenbild II
- 2008: Hans Josephsohn: Bildhauer
- 2008: Miroslav Tichý: Fotograf
- 2008: Bernard Buffet: Maler
- 2008: © Takashi Murakami
- 2009: Bogomir Ecker, Mark Wallinger und ein Unbekannter Meister: Angel Dust
- 2009: Yellow and Green. Positionen aus der Sammlung des MMK
- 2009: Double Reiner Ruthenbeck: Umgekippte Möbel, 1971
- 2009: Sarah Morris: Gemini Dressage
- 2009: Gerhard Richter: 2 Seestücke, 1975
- 2009: Jack Goldstein
- 2009: Double Sol LeWitt: Wall Drawing #261, 1975
- 2009: Peter Roehr: Werke aus Frankfurter Sammlungen
- 2009: Double Isa Genzken: 3 Vollellipsoide Skulpturen, 1978
- 2010: Radical Conceptual. Positionen aus der Sammlung des MMK
- 2010: Funktionen der Zeichnung. Konzeptuelle Kunst auf Papier aus der Sammlung des MMK
- 2010: Double Wolfgang Laib: Blütenstaub von Haselnuß
- 2010: Florian Hecker: Event, Stream, Objekt
- 2010: Double Andreas Slominski: Fallen – Hochsprunganlage – Berg Sportgeräte, 1988
- 2010: Double Anri Sala: "Title Suspended", 2008
- 2010: Not in Fashion. Mode und Fotografie der 90er Jahre
- 2010: The Lucid Evidence. Fotografie aus der Sammlung des MMK
- 2011: New Frankfurt Internationals: Stories and Stages
- 2011: Félix González-Torres: Specific Objects without Specific Form
- 2011: MMK 1991–2011. 20 Jahre Gegenwart im MMK, MMK Zollamt und MainTor-Areal
- 2011: Douglas Gordon
- 2012: Andy Warhol: Headlines
- 2012: MAKING HISTORY. Im Rahmen von RAY – Fotografieprojekte Frankfurt Rhein/Main
- 2012: Fotografie Total. Werke aus der Sammlung des MMK
- 2012: Thomas Scheibitz: One-Time Pad
- 2012: Alex Monteith: Exercise Blackbird
- 2013: Carsten Nicolai: Unidisplay. Uni(psycho)acoustic
- 2013: Rineke Dijkstra: The Krazy House
- 2013: Danica Dakić: Safe Frame
- 2013: Franz West: Wo ist mein Achter?
- 2013/2014: Hélio Oiticica: Das große Labyrinth
- 2014: Die Göttliche Komödie: Himmel, Hölle, Fegefeuer aus Sicht afrikanischer Gegenwartskünstler
- 2014/2015: Subodh Gupta: Everything is Inside
- 2014/2015: Sturtevant. Drawing Double Reversal
- 2015: Gerald Domenig: Ausstellungsvorbereitung
- 2015: Isa Genzken: New Works
- 2015: Imagine Reality. RAY 2015 Fotografieprojekte Frankfurt RheinMain
- 2015: William Forsythe: The Fact of Matter
- 2016: Kader Attia: Sacrifice and Harmony
- 2016–17: Mathieu Kleyebe Abonnenc: Mefloquine Dreams
- 2016–17: Fiona Tan: Geografie der Zeit
- 2016–17: 25 Jahre MMK Museum für Moderne Kunst – Neue Sammlungspräsentation
- 2017: Ed Atkins: Corpsing
- 2017: Claudia Andujar: Morgen darf nicht gestern sein
- 2017: Carolee Schneemann: Kinetische Malerei
- 2017–18: A Tale of Two Worlds. Experimentelle Kunst Lateinamerikas der 1940er- bis 80er-Jahre im Dialog mit der Sammlung des MMK
- 2018–19: Cady Noland
- 2019: Marianna Simnett
- 2019–20: Museum
- 2020: Frank Walter
- 2020: Marcel Duchamp
- 2022: Stéphane Mandelbaum
- 2022–23: Rosemarie Trockel
- 2023: Cameron Rowland
- 2023–24: Elizabeth Catlett
- 2023–24: Helena Uambembe
- 2024: "There is no there there"
- 2026: Fritz Scholder

The museum and its director, Susanne Gaensheimer, were commissioned to curate the German Pavilion at the Venice Biennale in 2011 and 2013.

== Gallery ==
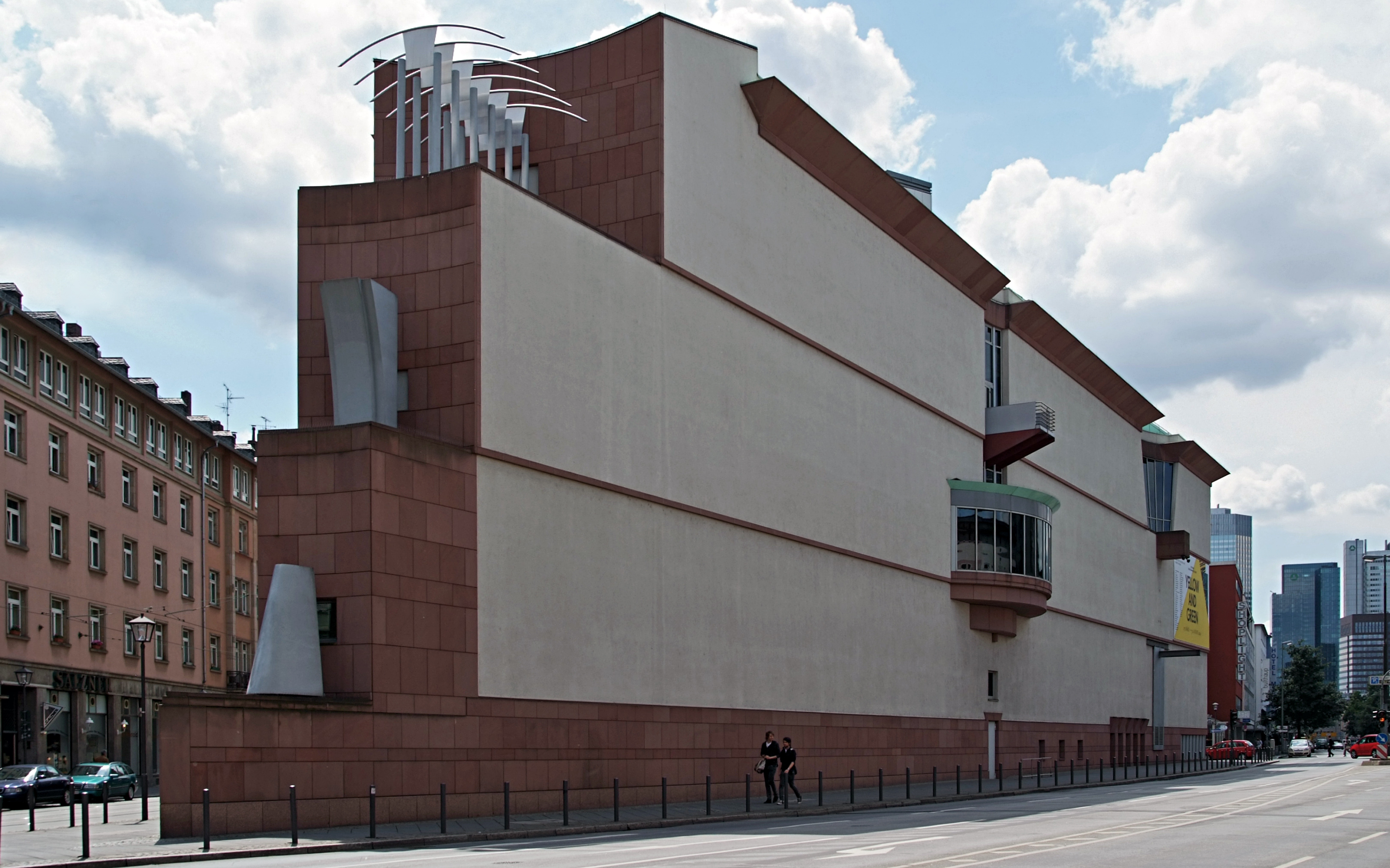
Northern facade of the museum

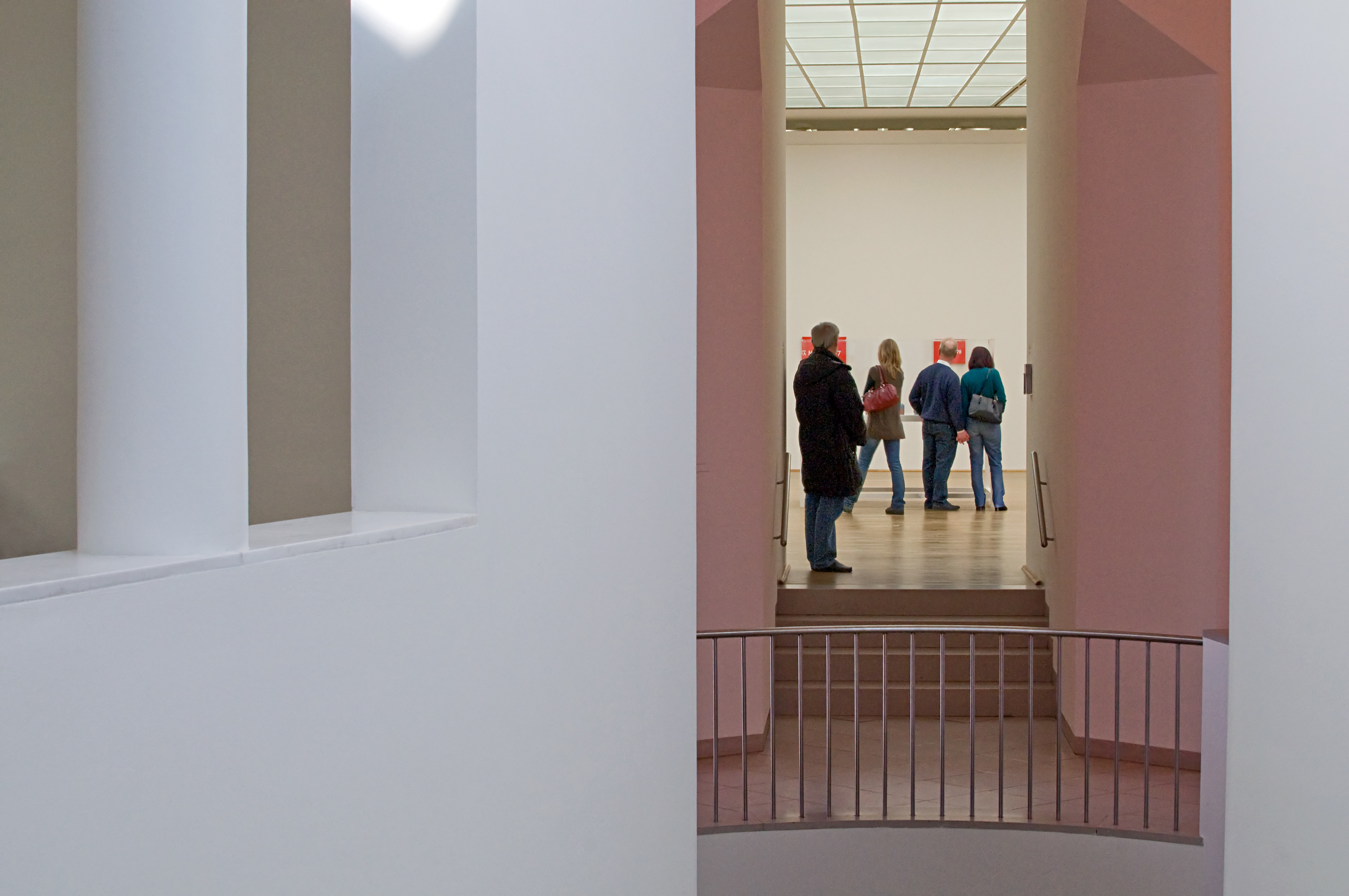
Museum interior

== Bibliography ==
- Iden, Peter; Lauter, Rolf: Bilder für Frankfurt: Bestandskatalog des Museums für Moderne Kunst, München, Prestel 1985, ISBN 978-3-7913-0702-2
- Conley, Patrick (1989). "Jean-Christophe Ammann. Fragen an den Direktor des Museums für Moderne Kunst" [Jean-Christophe Ammann. Questions to the director of the Museum of Modern Art]. ART Position (in German). 1 (3): 7–9. ISSN 0937-440X.
- Publikationsliste des MMK, July 2004 edition (PDF-Version, 60 KB)
- Kiefer, Theresia: Architektur und Konzeption eines zeitgenössischen Museums am Beispiels des Museums für moderne Kunst in Frankfurt am Main. 1995
- Bee, Andreas: Zusammengedrängt zwischen zwei Buchdeckeln. In: Zehn Jahre Museum für Moderne Kunst Frankfurt am Main. Köln 2003
- Hollein, Hans: Ausstellen, Aufstellen, Abstellen Überlegungen zur Aufgabe des Museums für Moderne Kunst. In: Museum für Moderne Kunst. Schriftreihe des Hochbauamtes zu Bauaufgaben der Stadt Frankfurt am Main. Der Magistrat der Stadt Frankfurt am Main. Frankfurt 1991. ISBN 978-3-433-02405-8.
- Ammann, Jean-Christophe; Christmut Präger: Museum für Moderne Kunst und Sammlung Ströher. Frankfurt 1992
- Lauter, Rolf (ed.): Das Museum für Moderne Kunst und die Sammlung Ströher. Zur Geschichte einer Privatsammlung, Ausstellungskatalog (5. Dezember 1994 bis 8. Januar 1995), Frankfurt am Main, 1994. ISBN 3-7973-0585-0.
- Klotz, Heinrich (1984). "Das neue Frankfurt". Jahrbuch für Architektur. ISSN 0720-4590.
- Hans Hollein, Gestaltungsprinzipien der Museumsarchitektur. In: Iden, Peter; Lauter, Rolf (Ed.), Bilder für Frankfurt, Bestandskatalog des Museums für Moderne Kunst Frankfurt. München 1985. ISBN 978-3-7913-0702-2
- Schoeler, Andreas von: Museum für Moderne Kunst Frankfurt am Main. Ernst & Sohn, 1991
