= Alexander Rudolf Hohlfeld =

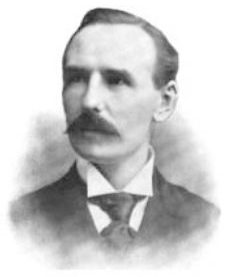
- Born: December 29, 1865; Dresden, Kingdom of Saxony
- Died: May 18, 1956 (aged 90); Madison, Wisconsin, U.S.
- Education: Vanderbilt University
- Occupation: Academic
- Spouse: Helen Voss (m. 1890)

Alexander Rudolf Hohlfeld (December 29, 1865 – May 18, 1956) was a professor of German at the University of Wisconsin from 1901 until 1936.

== Early and professional life ==
Hohlfeld was born in Dresden, Kingdom of Saxony, on December 29, 1865, to Karl Gottlieb Hohlfeld and Helene (maiden name Libbert) Hohlfeld. He attended high school at the Annen Realschule in Dresden, Germany. Thereafter he studied modern languages from 1884 until 1888, receiving a doctorate at the University of Leipzig in 1888. He studied in Paris in 1889 and thereafter he was an instructor in French at Vanderbilt University from 1889-90. In 1890 he married Helen Voss from Elgin, Illinois. Hohlfeld was an adjunct professor of Romance languages at Vanderbilt from 1890-2, then professor of Germanic languages from 1892–1901, becoming dean of that department at Vanderbilt in 1900-1. In 1904, Hohlfeld was appointed chairman of the University of Wisconsin German department, holding this position until his retirement in 1936. Helmut Rehder, whose doctorate was from the University of Heidelberg, Germany, was his successor as department chairman.

== Accomplishments ==
Hohlfeld became a contributing editor to Americana Germanica in 1898. He then became chairman of the Central division of the Modern Language Association of America in 1904. He was also a member of the Modern Language Association of England, the Goethe-Gesellschaft (Goethe Society) in Weimar, the Deutsche Shakespeare-Gesellschaft (German Shakespeare Society), the Deutsche Bibliographische Gesellschaft (German Bibliography Society), the Gesellschaft für Theatergeschichte (Society for the History of Theater) of Berlin, and the Sächsicher Neuphilogen-Verband (Saxonian New Philology Union). His life's work as a scholar of the German language was recognized by the City of Frankfurt Germany with the Goethe Plaque in 1951.

A residence house within Ogg Hall dormitory, which opened in 2007 at the University of Wisconsin, Madison, carries his name.

== Death ==
Hohlfeld died at his home in Madison on April 18, 1956.
