= Hans Bethge =

Hans Bethge may refer to:

- Hans Bethge (poet) (1876–1946), German poet and authority on Tang dynasty poetry
- Hans Bethge (aviator) (1890–1918), German World War I flying ace
