= Friedrich Bethge =

German poet, playwright and dramatist

Friedrich Bethge (24 May 1891 – 17 September 1963) was a German poet, playwright and dramatist.

Bethge was born in Berlin. He was a member of the Nazi Party. He died, aged 72, in Bad Homburg.

== Works ==
- Pfarr Peder, Tragödie, 1924
- Pierre und Jeannette, Novelle, 1926
- Reims, Drama, 1929/30
- Das Antlitz des Weltkrieges. Fronterlebnisse deutscher Soldaten, Hrsg. E. Jünger und F. Bethge, 1930/31
- Die Blutprobe, Komödie, 1934
- Der Marsch der Veteranen, Schauspiel, 1935
- Das triumphierende Herz, Novelle, 1937
- Rebellion um Preußen, Tragödie, 1939
- Anke von Skoepen, Tragödie, 1940
- Kopernikus, 1942
