= Frank Walter =

Antiguan artist and writer (1926–2009)

- Born: Francis Archibald Wentworth Walter; 11 September 1926; Horsford Hill (near Falmouth Harbour), Antigua
- Died: 11 February 2009 (aged 82); St. John's, Antigua and Barbuda
- Occupations: Artist, sculptor, photographer, composer, writer and philosopher
- Known for: Painting, sculpture, writing, philosophy, music
- Movement: Modern art
- Website: www.frankwalter.org

Frank Walter (11 September 1926 – 11 February 2009), born Francis Archibald Wentworth Walter, was an Antiguan artist, sculptor, photographer, composer, writer, and philosopher. Always shy and reserved, he became a recluse in later life so that he could devote himself to the pursuit of art. Walter has achieved posthumous recognition as one of the Caribbean's most significant artists.

Walter produced paintings that dealt with landscape, portraiture, and identity, as well as abstract explorations of nuclear energy and the universe. His portraits, both real and imagined, include a ballerina's legs in African Genealogy; Hitler in Dipsomaniac; Walter himself as Christ on the Cross; and Prince Charles and Diana, Princess of Wales as Adam and Eve.

== Early life ==
Frank Walter was born in Antigua on September 11, 1926. He studied at the Antigua Grammar School, where he excelled in Latin, science, agriculture and arts. Impressed by his abilities, Walter's tutors encouraged him to pursue a degree in medicine or law. Walter wanted to study agriculture.

Walter was raised by elderly family matriarchs and learned from oral histories at a young age that his ancestors included both aristocratic European slave owners and enslaved people of African descent. During Walter's youth, Antigua was a society divided along racial lines, and the reality of mixed-race families created outside of marriage was largely considered private knowledge and often lost through the generations.

In his youth, Walter's education and professional trajectory defied the statistical challenges facing young men of colour in 1930s Antigua, and the identity that he constructed was heavily influenced by his awareness of his aristocratic European forebears. Later in life, Walter became tormented by his descent from white slave owners, enslaved women, and illegitimate mixed-race children.

== Life in Europe ==
Walter was offered the opportunity to manage the entire Antiguan Sugar Syndicate in 1953, but he turned down this job to embark on what was intended to be a ten-year industrial Grand Tour of Great Britain and Europe. He was motivated by a desire to engage new technologies to alleviate the poverty of his fellow black countrymen, and wanted to introduce the latest European and British innovation in mining and agriculture to Antigua.

From 1953 to 1961, Walter spent eight years travelling in Europe and the UK struggling with a race-based caste system that relegated him to the menial role of unskilled labourer. During an interview for his first job in London, he proudly stated his role as manager. The employer rebuffed, "We don't have tropical sugar plantations in England", and offered him a job to clean the floors. Walter suffered from poverty resulting from subsistence wages, but continued to pursue his academic interests by studying in Europe's metropolitan libraries. During this period, Walter actively researched his family history and studied various aristocratic family trees. He became obsessed with his heritage, inventing connections to the regents of Britain and Europe—crowning himself as the 7th Prince of the West Indies, Lord of Follies and the Ding-a-Ding Nook. It is interesting to note that Follies and Ding-a-Ding Nook are the names of plantations owned by his white Antiguan ancestors.

The complexities of Walter's mixed-race identity and his frustrations with postcolonial society became increasingly apparent during his eight years in Europe and the UK. However, painting, writing, and time spent in the natural world provided solace, and memories of these environments were the subject of much of his art for the next sixty years of his life.

== Life in Dominica ==
When Walter arrived in Antigua in 1961, the sugar industry was on the brink of collapse. He relocated to the nearby island of Dominica, and applied for and received a land grant from the government. He named his 25-acre agricultural estate Mount Olympus and spent five years clearing the land by hand to create a sustainable and productive acreage. He selectively removed the canopy of bois diable trees to allow sunlight and air for fruit trees and vegetables. Using kilns, he repurposed these cleared materials as charcoal to make a viable local energy source he shared with his neighbors.

During this time, Walter continued to write poetry and prose, and also began to sculpt figures using wood harvested from his estate in a style that was likely inspired by the traditions of the Caribbean Arawak and African Dogon peoples.

Once Mount Olympus was prepared for planting in 1968, the government confiscated it from Walter. He was bereft at his loss and returned to Antigua.

== Seclusion in Antigua ==
In the late 1960s, Walter became involved in politics and wrote manifestos for the Antigua and Barbuda National Democratic Party. In 1971, he ran and was defeated by his relation, Sir George Walter, in Antigua's race for prime minister. Frank Walter chose to retire from public life and dedicate himself to his art practice in small studios in central St. John's. He worked as a photographer and a painter during this period, selling mostly small Polaroid photographs and tiny paintings of letters of the alphabet and landscape to tourists. No one knew of his larger-scale abstract and figurative paintings, which were done in secret, and stored for a large-scale exhibition that he planned but was never realized.

In 1993, Walter designed and built a house and art studio in the picturesque countryside above Falmouth Harbour, where he lived in peaceful isolation until his death in 2009. He sited the structures to enjoy spectacular views of Sugarloaf Mountain, Monk's Hill, Falmouth Harbour, and the sea, and dwelt in close proximity to nature. Without running water or electricity, Walter grew much of his own food, and lived near his relations who were organic farmers. His home was filled with paintings and sculpture that he made in secrecy and carefully arranged in his house. He was also surrounded by stacks of books on philosophy, law, history, botany, and heraldry. Walter's creative process relied on a multidisciplinary approach and a collection of curio to generate what Walter Benjamin identified in his 1931 essay "Unpacking My Library" as a "dialectical tension between the poles of order and disorder".

While he revered his paintings, Walter's sculptures held a talismanic power for him. They were kept close to him and never for sale to anyone as he believed they connected him to another world. He depicted figures as varied as ancient Arawak people, Antiguan farmers, European royalty, and men from outer space.

He revisited his memories in remarkable detail in painting and writing and explored nature as an avid environmentalist and student of science. Many portraits and landscapes drew upon his memories of travel in Scotland and Europe, and he classified his broad range of paintings as galactic, scientific, heraldic, and abstract.

== Artistic legacy ==
In Frank Walter: The Last Universal Man (Radius Books 2017), the Walter family and Barbara Paca worked with a group of distinguished experts with backgrounds in Antiguan politics, philanthropy, international affairs, and neurosurgery to establish the context and interdisciplinary nature of Walter's work. Nina Khrushcheva is responsible for the title, positing that the sheer diversity and depth of Walter's work as visual artist, musician, and philosopher allowed him to attain the humanist ideal of man exemplified in Leonardo da Vinci's Vitruvian Man (c. 1490).

Walter's struggle with his mental health gave him a unique perspective and can be seen as an inextricable part of his creativity and invention. For this reason, comparisons have been made between Frank Walter and mathematician John Nash, who was featured in the 1998 novel A Beautiful Mind by Sylvia Nasar and the 2001 film of the same name directed by Ron Howard.

Walter's art practice has been linked to a diverse group of artists, including Hilma af Klint (1862–1944), Adolf Wölfli (1864–1930), Alfred Wallis (1855–1942), Forrest Bess (1911–1977), and Henry Darger (1892–1973). These artists lived beyond the mainstream, and explored unconventional, fantastic, and deeply personal ideas.

There are few Caribbean parallels to Walter. Guyanese painter Aubrey Williams (1926–1990) shares much in terms of biography. They were both highly educated and enjoyed early careers as successful tropical plantation managers. They were the product of a British colonial heritage, and travelled in the early 1950s to England, where they encountered overt racism. For example, Pablo Picasso reduced Williams to his physical appearance when they met. The famous artist told him that he had a "fine head", and that he would like to paint him one day. According to The New York Times critic Jason Farago, Walter's paintings of Antiguan flora—the insignia of European nobility—and his small abstractions of stars and circles recall the pop art of Robert Indiana.

== Bibliography ==
Books

- With contributions from Nina Khruscheva, Mia Matthias, Barbara Paca and Frank Walter, Frank Walter’s Chessboard, published by Xavier Hufkens, 2022, 172 pages, English, ISBN 9789491245305
- Barbara Paca and Susanne Pfeffer (eds), (with contributions from Precious Okoyomon, Barbara Paca, Susanne Pfeffer, Cord Riechelmann, Gilane Tawadros, Krista Thompson, and Frank Walter), Frank Walter. Eine Retrospektive, Ausstellungs-Katalog Museum für Moderne Kunst (MMK), Frankfurt am Main, 2020, Köln: König, Walther, 2020, ISBN 978-3-96098-825-0
- Barbara Paca (ed.), (with contributions from The Honourable E. P. Chet Greene Minister of Foreign Affairs, International Trade; Nina Khrushcheva; Luigi di Marzi; The Honourable Daryll Matthew, Commissioner and Minister of Sports, Culture, Festivals, and the Arts, Antigua and Barbuda; and Marco Pianegonda), Find Yourself: Carnival and Resistance, Grafiche Veneziane on the occasion of the 58th International Art Exhibition at the Venice Biennale, 2019, Chapter "Carnival and Frank Walter's Universe". ISBN 978-1-7923-0699-0
- Barbara Paca (ed.), (with contributions from His Excellency, Sir Rodney Williams, Governor General of Antigua and Barbuda; Nina Khrushcheva; The Rt. Honourable Patricia Scotland, Secretary-General of the Commonwealth; Sir Mark Moody-Stuart; Caitlin Hoffman; Marcus Nakbar Crump; Sir Selvyn Walter; and Kenneth M. Milton), Frank Walter: The Last Universal Man, Radius Books on the occasion of the 57th International Art Exhibition at the Venice Biennale 2017, ISBN 978-1-942185-18-5
- Barbara Paca, Frank Walter, Art Basel, Miami Beach, Ingleby Gallery, 2013, ISBN 978-0-9566692-7-8
