= Jean-Christophe Ammann =

Swiss art historian (1939-2015)

Jean-Christophe Ammann (14 January 1939 – 13 September 2015) was a Swiss art historian and curator.

== Early life and education ==
Born in Berlin, Ammann, son of a chemist, grew up in a German-speaking family in Fribourg. He actually wanted to become a doctor, but after his Matura in 1959 at the Collège Saint-Michel he studied history of art, Biblical archaeology and German literature. In 1966, he received his doctorate from the University of Fribourg on the work of Louis Moilliet.

== Career ==
From 1966 to 1968, Ammann was an assistant to Harald Szeemann at the Kunsthalle Bern. He then directed the Kunstmuseum Luzern until 1977. In 1971, he was Swiss commissioner for the Biennale Paris and in 1972 he worked with Harald Szeemann on the conception of documenta 5, which "went down in exhibition history as the most interesting and influential" In 1978, he was co-organiser of Arte Natura in the international pavilion of the Venice Biennale.

=== Kunsthalle Basel ===
From 1978 to 1988, he took over the management of the Kunsthalle Basel. Among the conditions of his inauguration were better lighting conditions, partial removal of the wooden panelling on the walls, a continuous coat of unbroken white paint. He held six exhibitions a year with international as well as Swiss artists, including Gilbert & George, Martin Disler, Helmut Federle, Mario Merz and Rolf Winnewisser, whom he had already presented in Lucerne. With a penchant for painting, Ammann presented Enzo Cucchi, Nicola de Maria, Francesco Clemente, Walter Dahn, Rainer Fetting, Georg Baselitz in Basel. Miriam Cahn had the first institutional exhibition in 1983 with charcoal drawings. In 1987, he showed light installations by James Turrell "opening our earth to the cosmic". In 1988, he opened the Kunsthalle to Richard Serra, who covered each of the long side walls of the skylight hall with a strip of the densest graffiti hatching and achieved a fantastic change in the spatial effect. His 60 or so exhibitions in Basel followed a wide variety and were not restricted by formal or ideological boundaries. The works shown asserted themselves "... through "quality", for every art lover a fixed but never quite definable quantity. For Ammann, it is expressed, among other things, in the sum of the "energy" that a creative work must possess." In addition, he ensured that a sculpture by Serra was installed in Basel's Wenkenpark. Since 1981 Ammann was a member of the Emanuel Hoffmann-Stiftung in Basel.

=== Museum for modern art ===
In 1989, Ammann moved to Frankfurt and opened there as director on 6 June 1991 the new museum designed by the Viennese architect Hans Hollein designed Museum für Moderne Kunst. The new museum gained international renown with a new form of exhibition, the "Szenenwechsel", which was held every six months and took place a total of twenty times with the help of private sponsors. During the Szenenwechsel, the museum's holdings were rearranged every six months and enriched with new acquisitions, loans or special exhibitions. Ammann headed the house until the end of 2001, his successor was Udo Kittelmann.

In 1995, Ammann was commissioner of the German pavilion at the Venice Biennale. From 1989 to 1997, he was chairman of the board of the Hessische Kulturstiftung, since 1992 lecturer at the universities of Frankfurt and Gießen and since 1998 professor at the Goethe University Frankfurt.

In 1999, Ammann was commissioned by Deutsche Börse to build up a collection of artistic photographs. He was also a member of the advisory board of the art collection of the Swiss banking house UBS. As curator, he was responsible, among other things, for the exhibition Crossart. Van Gogh to Beuys at the Art and Exhibition Hall of the Federal Republic of Germany in Bonn (2005) and In the Beginning was the Word... - On Language in Contemporary Art at the Haus der Kunst in Munich (2006; with Corinna Thierolf). Between 2010 and 2015, he curated (with Anna Wesle) several exhibitions at the Museum Franz Gertsch in Burgdorf/Switzerland and at the Galerie Perpétuel in Frankfurt.

== Other activities ==
- UBS Art Collection, Member of the Advisory Board (since 2005)

== Legacy ==
After leaving the Museum für Moderne Kunst in 2001, Ammann left the museum several works from his private collection as well as his collected correspondence, which was inventoried in the Archive Jean-Christophe Ammann and documents 35 years of his curatorial activity.

== Personal life ==
Ammann was married to the artist Judith Ammann and lived in Frankfurt. He died in September 2015 at the age of 76.

== Curations ==
Ammann curated other exhibitions (selection): :

- Lucie Beppler, Anke Röhrscheid, Elly Strick, Kunsthalle Palazzo, Liestal, Basel (2007).
- Songlines, Balthasar Burkhard, Museum Franz Gertsch – Burgdorf Schweiz (2007)
- Elly Strik, Laboratorio, Kunsthalle Lugano (2008)
- Sammlung Deutsche Börse mit Anne-Marie Beckmann, CO Berlin (2009)
- Scent of Desire, Balthasar Burkhard, Museum im Bellpark, Kriens (Lucern) (2009)
- Martina Essig, Laboratorio, Kunsthalle Lugano (2009)
- Die Bilder tun was mit mir: Sammlung Frieder Burda, Museum Frieder Burda, Baden-Baden (in cooperation with Patricia Kamp) (2010)
- A rebours: Martin Eder, Elly Strik, Caro Suerkemper, Christoph Wachter, Centre Culturel Suisse, Paris (2010).
- Joseph Beuys – Energieplan, Stiftung Schloss Moyland (2010)
- Kathrin Borer, Laboratorio, Kunsthalle Lugano (2010)
- Annika van Vugt, foundation of the Frankfurter Sparkasse 1822, Frankfurt (2015).

== Quote ==
I think that art must continue to draw its substance from the exploration of the self and from an awareness and thinking of the present. This thinking of the present is the most difficult thing because I have to think the diffuse precisely and the precise diffusely. Nothing has changed at all in this mission of the artist to be active in this society.

— Jean-Christophe Ammann

== Awards ==
- 1993 – Deutscher Kritikerpreis für Bildende Kunst
- 1999 – French Ordre des Arts et des Lettres (Officer)
- 2001 – Theo Wormland Art Prize, Munich
- 2003 – Goethe Plaque of the City of Frankfurt
- 2006 – Laureate of the Herbert Zapp Dr.-Herbert-Zapp-Initiativ-Preises

== Publications ==
- Bei näherer Betrachtung. Zeitgenössische Kunst verstehen und deuten. Westend Verlag, Frankfurt, 2009, ISBN 978-3-938060-43-8.
- French edition: En y regardant mieux. Les Presses du Reél, Dijon, 2010, ISBN 978-2-84066397-3.
- Ein Briefwechsel (with Ankalina Dahlem). Exhibition catalogue. Publisher: Galerie Bernd Slutzky, Frankfurt, 2001, ISBN 3-9805670-7-9
- with Harald Szeemann: Von Hodler zur Antiform, Geschichte der Kunsthalle Bern. Benteli Verlag, Bern 1970, new edition 2005.
- Louis Moilliet. Das Gesamtwerk. DuMont Schauberg, Cologne, 1972.
- with Christmut Präger: Museum für Moderne Kunst und Sammlung Ströher, Schriften des Museums für Moderne Kunst, Frankfurt 1992. ISBN 9783882704648
- Bewegung im Kopf. Lindinger + Schmid, Regensburg 1993.
- Rémy Zaugg – Gespräche mit Jean-Christophe Ammann. Cantz Verlag, Parkett Verlag, Stuttgart 1994.
- with Rolf Lauter: Peter Fischli; David Weiss: Raum unter der Treppe, Schriften des Museums für Moderne Kunst, Frankfurt 1995. ISBN 9783893227617
- Kulturfinanzierung. Lindinger + Schmid, Regensburg 1995.
- Annäherung. Über die Notwendigkeit der Kunst. Lindinger + Schmid, Regensburg 1996.
- Alighiero Boetti 1965-1994, Galleria Civica d'Arte Moderna e Contemporanea, Turin, 1996; Musée d'Art Moderne, Villeneuve d'Ascq, 1996-1997; Museum Moderner Kunst, Stiftung Ludwig Wien, 20er Haus, 1997. ISBN 9788820211745
- Das Glück zu sehen. Kunst beginnt dort, wo der Geschmack aufhört. Regensburg: Lindinger und Schmid, 1998, ISBN 3-929970-35-X.
- Robert Strübin. Musik sehen, Bilder hören. Published by Verein ZwischenZeit, with a foreword by Jean-Christophe Ammann, Schwabe Verlag, Basel 2010, ISBN 978-3-7965-2699-2.
- Bei näherer Betrachtung. Westend Verlag, Frankfurt 2007.
- Bei näherer Betrachtung. Westend Verlag, 3rd extended edition, Frankfurt 2009.
- En y regardant mieux. Les presses du réel, Saint-Etienne 2010.
- Kunst? – Ja, Kunst – Die Sehnsucht der Bilder. Westend Verlag, Frankfurt 2014.
- Alighiero Boetti, Catalogo Generale. Electa Editore, Milan, Volume I, 2011; Volume II, 2012; Volume III/1, 2015.
- Alighiero Boetti, Catalogo Generale. Tomo primo, 1961–1971, Miland 2009.
- Alighiero Boetti, Catalogo Generale. Tomo secondo, 1972–1978, Miland 2012.
- Alighiero Boetti, Catalogo Generale. Tomo terzo, parte I, 1979–1987, Miland 2015
