= Curatorial platform =

Type of organization and management system

A curatorial platform is:

- as an organization: an entity comprising curators and related people with a collective curatorial goal.
- as a management system: a system (software or physical) that facilitates the realization of curatorial tasks and the administration of this realization.

== As an organization ==
A curatorial platform is an organization or an organized social group whose principal activity is focused on the development and presentation of cultural artifacts according to clearly defined and coherent themes or organizational principles. In contrast to a gallery, whose focus is the exhibition and—in the case of a private gallery—sale of finalized artwork, a curatorial platform is concerned with the conjunction of artistic practice and curatorial practice.

Following the development of the independent or freelance curator following 1969’s watershed exhibition Live In Your Head: When Attitudes Become Form and Harald Szeemann's subsequent defiance of then-established career trajectories, the role of the curator in the development of modern art has become ever more important. This is evidenced by the growth—particularly in the United States and the United Kingdom—of curatorial studies and workshops.

The notion of a curatorial platform extending and reinforcing these studies and attitudes is relatively new. The group Kuratorisk Aktion (Curatorial Action) was established in 2005, and while Rhizome was founded in 1996 it did not define itself explicitly as a curatorial platform. Rhizome's activity—‘the creation, presentation, discussion and preservation of contemporary art’—is nonetheless recognizably curatorial. Meanwhile, there are also digital curatorial platforms that either collect curators with specific interests, or focus more on artist interaction, such as in the case of Curatron

There is general agreement about the aims of such platforms as that last—in the Peregrine Arts manifesto, the organization clearly states that their curatorial platform does not replace ‘traditional ensemble-based or exhibiting institutions, such as orchestras, museums, and theater companies, [but] provides a foundation and structure for organizing and amplifying current artistic resources in the pursuit of true innovation and artistic impact.’

== As a management system ==
The term curatorial platform can also refer to a curatorial management system (usually an application software) that helps curators and curatorial groups (see "as organization") in their focus, social organization, and administration tasks.
