= Frederick J. Brown =

American painter (1945–2012)

Frederick James Brown
- Born: February 6, 1945; Greensboro, Georgia
- Died: May 5, 2012 (aged 67); Scottsdale, Arizona, United States
- Education: Southern Illinois University, Carbondale, IL
- Known for: Abstract expressionism, Figurative
- Notable work: The History of Art, John Henry, The Assumption of Mary

Frederick J. Brown (February 6, 1945 – May 5, 2012) was a New York City based visual artist originally from Chicago. His style ranges from abstract expressionism to figurative. His art work was influenced by historical, religious, narrative and urban themes. He is noted for his extensive portrait series of jazz and blues musicians.

His work is part of the collections of the Metropolitan Museum of Art, the Smithsonian American Art Museum and National Portrait Gallery, as well as the Kemper Museum of Contemporary Art in Kansas City, Mo. In 1988, Brown had the first solo exhibition by a Western artist at the Museum of the Chinese Revolution (now the National Museum of China) in Tienanmen Square in Beijing, China.

== Early life ==
Frederick James Brown was born in Greensboro, Georgia on February 6, 1945. His mother was Geneva Brown and his father was Andrew Bentley. He was raised near the steel mills on Chicago's Southside. Brown was exposed to the blues through musicians in the neighborhood such as Muddy Waters, Howlin' Wolf, and Memphis Slim.

Brown attended Chicago Vocational High School. He then attended Southern Illinois University Carbondale, (SIU) graduating in 1968 with a degree in Art.

== Career ==
In 1970, Brown moved from Chicago to New York City's SoHo neighborhood which at the time was home to many artists, musicians, writers and dancers. There he collaborated on multi-media projects with other artists including jazz musicians Ornette Coleman and Anthony Braxton, video photographer Anthony Ramos, and other painters like Grégoire Müller, Frank Bowling and Daniel LaRue Johnson. In addition to collaborative paintings, Brown contributed to performing arts productions like Be Aware, Stolen Moments and Portrait of a Painter. Anthony Braxton composed and performed the music and Anthony Ramos created the videos for the latter two projects. Brown's loft at 120 Wooster Street became a gathering place in SoHo during this period. Brown exhibited with Marlborough Fine Art in New York from 1983 through 1990. During this time, he focused much of his work on creating portraits of jazz and blues musicians. This series contains over 350 pieces, including popular artists such as Ornette Coleman, Louis Armstrong, Billie Holiday, and Lionel Hampton in addition to less well-known jazz and blues artists.

Brown taught art at the Central College of Fine Arts in Beijing in 1985 and 1987. In June 1988, Brown had a retrospective exhibition of 100 art works at the Museum of the Chinese Revolution, becoming one of the earliest Western artists to exhibit in China (Robert Rauschenberg preceded him with ROCI CHINA at the National Art Museum of China in 1985).

Brown created a five-panel painting, The Life of Christ Altarpiece, for the Museum of Contemporary Religious Art, St. Louis University, in 1992. The three central panels represent the Baptism, Descent From the Cross, and Resurrection of Christ, with two side panels of the Madonna and Child and the Descent into Hell.

In 1993, Brown completed The Assumption of Mary at Xavier University of Louisiana. The painting is three stories tall and is on a single canvas.

Crosby Kemper commissioned Brown to do a site specific project for the Kemper Museum of Contemporary Art in Kansas City, which was under construction. In 1994, Brown's personal interpretation of The History of Art, a series of 110 paintings chronicling the progression of art through human history was installed in the museum's Café Sebastienne (named after Brown's daughter, Sebastienne).

From 2002 to 2003, Brown had a retrospective exhibition titled Frederick J. Brown: Portraits in Jazz, Blues, and Other Icons. The exhibition traveled from the Kemper Museum of Contemporary Art and the American Jazz Museum in Kansas City to the New Orleans Museum of Art and the Studio Museum of Harlem.

In September 2008 Brown organized a symposium of artists, musicians, dancers and poets at Cornell University on the Creative Movement of the 1970s. Speakers included bassist Charlie Haden, saxophonists Henry Threadgill, Sam Rivers and James Jordan, artist Tony Ramos, poet and activist Felipe Luciano, songwriter Malcolm Mooney, writer and music critic Stanley Crouch, designer Jean Claude Samuel, dancer Megan Bowman-Brown and others.

== Personal life ==
Brown married modern dancer and fellow artist Megan Bowman in 1979. They have two children, Sebastienne and Bentley. Brown split his time between New York and Carefree, Arizona.
