= ILiana Fokianaki =

Greek curator, writer and theorist

iLiana Fokianaki
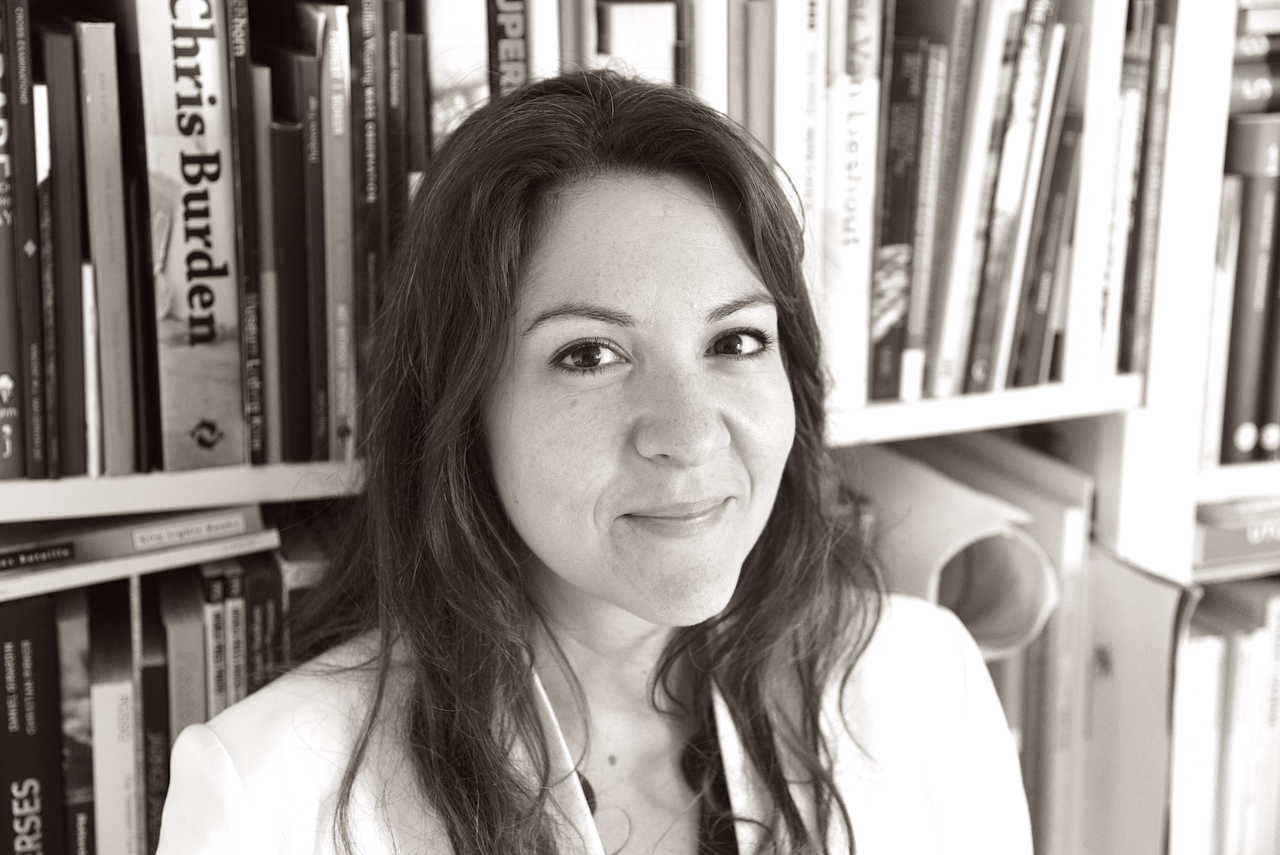
- Fokianaki at Dutch Art Institute
- Born: Thessaloniki, Greece
- Education: City University London

iLiana Fokianaki is the director of Kunsthalle Bern. She is a Greek curator, writer, theorist, educator and former journalist based in Bern, and occasionally Athens and Rotterdam.

== Biography ==
Fokianaki holds a B.A. in Fine Arts from Oxford Brookes University in Oxford and a M.A. in Arts Criticism and Management from City University London.

Fokianaki's exhibitions explore the relation between art, formations of power and how they metamorphose under the influence of geopolitics, national identity and cultural and anthropological histories.

She is the founding director of contemporary art institution State of Concept in Athens.

Fokianaki was part of the artistic team (curator and programmer) at Kunsthal Extra City in Antwerp from 2017–2019, where she curated two large-scale group exhibitions: Extra Citizen (2017) and Extra States: Nations in Liquidation (2018).

In May 2022, Fokianaki was announced as the artistic director of the festival Survival Kit, organised by the Latvian Center for Contemporary Art, in Riga.

In November 2023, Fokianaki was announced as the new director of Kunsthalle Bern

== Exhibitions ==
Since 2013 she has showcased at State of Concept, solo exhibitions of artists such as Laure Prouvost, the research agency Forensic Architecture, Croatian artist Sanja Iveković, Dutch collective Metahaven, the film collective Rojava Film Commune. The exhibition of the Rojava Film Commune Fokianaki curated, titled "Forms of Freedom", was featured in Art Forum magazine in 2020, and has travelled to Galerija Nova, in Zagreb, the exhibition space of e-flux publications in New York and Moderna Galerija / Museum of Modern Art of Slovenia, in Ljubljana.

She has curated State (in) Concepts at Kadist Art Foundation in Paris in 2017. and the group exhibition at La Colonie (Art Space) "The Trials of Justice". She has curated the solo exhibition of artist Kapwani Kiwanga at the Formerly Known as Witte de With Center for Contemporary Art in Rotterdam, which coincided with Kiwanga's award for the Marcel Duchamp Prize of the Centre Pompidou.

In 2023, she was the co-curator of Machinations, a large-scale research and exhibition project at Museo Nacional Centro de Arte Reina Sofía.

Her project "The Bureau of Care" received the Solidarity Grant of the European Cultural Foundation.

== Teaching ==
Fokianaki is a lecturer at the Dutch Art Institute (DAI) of the ArtEZ University of Arts in the Netherlands, and was a guest lecturer at HISK in Ghent, Belgium and a resident curator at the NTU Center for Contemporary Art in Singapore. She has guest lectured at HISK in Ghent, Belgium at Columbia University, and The Willem de Kooning Academy, the art school of the Rotterdam University of Applied Sciences among others.

She has lectured in various institutions on issues that explore how institutional and curatorial practices respond to the current economic and socio-political shifts in the West

She writes for various international art journals and publications such as a joint opinion piece on art, economy and documenta's arrival in Athens, written with former Greek Minister of Finance Yanis Varoufakis and an opinion piece around the discussion of looted artefacts and specifically the Parthenon Marbles for frieze (magazine).
