= State of Concept =

Greek non-profit independent art institution

State of Concept Athens is a not-for-profit, independent art institution, founded in Athens in 2013 by curator and theorist iLiana Fokianaki. It is the first institution of this kind to operate in Greece.

It has hosted group and solo exhibitions of international and Greek artists among them Tania Bruguera, Keren Cytter, Sanja Ivekovic, Cao Fei, Basim Magdy, Rachel Maclean, Laure Prouvost, Jonas Staal, the Russian collective Chto Delat, Kader Attia research agency Forensic Architecture and others.

It has hosted talks and events with curators, scholars and academics such as Nato Thompson, Maria Lind, Emily Pethick and has hosted exhibitions by curators such as the curatorial collective and directors of Kunsthalle Wien What, How and for Whom / WHW.

It is known for its socially engaged projects, with the participation of artists such as Emily Jacir, Banu Cennetoğlu and others.

In 2020, it received the Culture of Solidarity Fund Grant of the European Cultural Foundation for its research platform 'The Bureau of Care' responding to challenges for cultural practice under the COVID-19 pandemic.
