= Oil and Sugar 2 =

Artwork by Kader Attia

Oil and Sugar #2 is a work of art created by Algerian-French artist Kader Attia. It is a film of small, rectangular blocks of white sugar stacked in the shape of a cube on a decoratively rimmed silver plate. Petroleum oil is poured from a vessel and splashed onto the cube nonuniformly. The oil stains the white sugar cubes in streaks of black as it penetrates the porous sugar blocks and pools on the plate. Eventually, the stacks of sugar begin to collapse from saturation, with the entire cube folding in on itself. The end result is a dissolving, distorted black mass of sugar cubes soaked in oil.

The uniform sugar cube covered in black evokes imagery of the Kaaba in Mecca, the site of the Hajj pilgrimage in Islam. Other interpretations of this artwork see Attia as challenging the white cube as the "archetypal form of modernist architecture." Slowly consuming the white cube, the application of oil has been interpreted as a confrontation of the "ongoing destruction and violence sparked by religious and political difference and competition for fossil fuel resources in the Middle East." Motivated by the problem of colonization and the "notion of domination between one order of things and another one", Oil and Sugar #2 plays intentionally with paradoxes— exploring "creation through disintegration, presence through absence, and fullness through emptiness."

== Production/Design ==
Recorded in real time, Oil and Sugar #2 is displayed as a video showing, on repeat, the destruction of a block of sugar cubes drenched in oil. The piece is said by the Boston Institute of Contemporary Art to imbue "beauty through collapse… through means both direct and resonant." Through the medium of video, Kader Attia multiplies and eternalizes a direct and singular moment of destruction. When discussing the motivation behind his body of work, Attia has explicitly stated his interest in the "evocation of something by its contrary". In Oil and Sugar #2, Attia evokes contrast, capturing formal destruction via 2D video, rendering "three-dimensional forms in(to) two-dimensional moving/still images."

== Exhibitions ==
The recording of Oil and Sugar #2 was first displayed in Attia's 2007 exhibition Momentum 9: Kader Attia at the Institute of Contemporary Art in Boston. The museum described the exhibition as a "poetic meditation on childhood, absence, and community"; themes of politics and violence were referenced in many other works in the exhibition, including the titular piece Momentum 9. Oil and Sugar #2 was later displayed during Attia's show On Silence. The artwork is currently housed in the Tate Modern, though not currently on display.

=== Subsequent publicity ===
"Oil and Sugar" was the title of the 3rd Eva Holtby Lecture on Contemporary Culture; the talk, given by Glenn D. Lowry, devoted significant attention to Attia's work and its connections to the broader category of "Islamic Art." Lowry saw Oil and Sugar #2 as a metaphor for dialectical issues of contemporary Islamic Art at a global scale, due to the "incongruous" materials used in the piece and Attia's multi-national origin.

== Connections to global issues ==
Critics and scholars interpret Attia's works as a commentary on postcolonialism and social injustice (due in part to his time in the French alternative civilian service). Oil and Sugar #2 can be better understood by examining its connections to contemporary political debates. According to Glenn D. Lowry, artists in the Islamic world are often pressed to create works with "universal" connections. He states in a lecture centered around Oil and Sugar #2 that "[they] risk...becoming increasingly marginalized in a world that demands of artists an ability to speak and work across cultures, and to transcend local and regional identities."

=== Sugar ===
In Oil and Sugar #2, through using sugar as a building material, Attia evokes the history of sugar—in particular, its role in the slave trade. He states in an interview "the modern relation [of sugar] with slavery is this transformation of a human person into goods–into sugar." It has been widely argued that Capitalism, critiqued by Attia as a Western economic and political canon dominance upon Southwest Asia and North Africa, originated with the colonial sugar industry. In the modern period, the presence of processed white sugar is linked to the presence of Western industries and therefore ongoing colonization of formerly-colonized countries. Attia's choice of sugar was further inspired by food's sensory triggers. In an interview with Sergio Vega, he states "I'm very interested in food politically." He continues to weave a connection between food and emotion and the power of food to trigger emotions used "to resist a form of commodification" and declare cultural heritage. The quotidian use of sugar as a food item capable of evoking sensory responses and its use in Oil and Sugar #2 could reinforce the artist's efforts towards decolonization.

=== Oil ===
Attia's art investigates a space's colonial history and its postcolonial modernity to reveal the devastation of colonization and ingrained colonial thought. As the petroleum oil is poured over a pristine sugar-cube formation in Attia's Oil and Sugar #2, the oil divulges itself as a colonial tool used by Western powers to asset economic and political dominance over oil markets in the Middle East and North Africa. The oil market's continuation of neoimperialism by the U.S. stemmed from the aftermath of colonization. After Algeria, Attia's birth and childhood home, was violently possessed by the French in 1830 and reclaimed as an independent country in 1962, it was left with a dysfunctional economy without technological means of production. The U.S. became a critical investor of infrastructure to Algeria and became its most prominent oil and gas importer in 1978. As Algeria struggled to pay off its industrialization debts to the U.S., it continued to pour investments into the oil sector, under-prioritizing agriculture and education. The U.S. successfully established a profitable dependency for itself that fulfilled its need for oil as well as its desire to maintain the position and value of the Dollar as the sole trade currency within the oil market. With the strategy of U.S. 'goodwill' in mind, Attia uses oil to critique the present status quo of "modernity as embodied by Western capitalism and the mechanisms and ideologies of colonialism," pointing to the neo-imperialist and exploitative nature of Western involvement.

== Connection between oil and sugar ==
The material goods of oil and sugar are circulated commonly throughout the post-modern world; although, by design, oil and sugar are not made to occupy the same space– as evidenced by the collapse that ensues upon their introduction to one another in Attia's piece. Viewers of Oil and Sugar #2 are faced with the challenge of looking at two seemingly antithetical materials and making a relationship between them. That oil and sugar would occupy the same space at all is paradoxical, given that one will erode the other. Both oil and sugar fuel different modes of privileged contemporary life: oil sustaining vehicles and buildings; sugar sustaining human bodies. Both materials also share commonalities in their histories rooted in Western exploitation. Attia encourages readings of his works within a system of references: "cultural, historical, formal, material, personal." There is no monotonous meaning or motivation behind Oil and Sugar #2; that it be observed in many ways and in contexts informs its identity and motivates Attia artistically.

== Connections to Islam ==
The shapes and colors of Oil and Sugar #2 allude to elements of Islam, in particular the Kaaba in Mecca, the holiest site in Islam. Pouring black oil on top of the cubical arrangement of the sugar creates visual similarities to the Kaaba, potentially directing the audience towards themes of pilgrimage and reverence. Glenn D. Lowry, in "Oil and Sugar: Contemporary Art and Islamic Culture," argues that the Kaaba is Attia's "point of departure." (Oil and Sugar #2 is not the only work of Attia's that is said to be inspired by the Kaaba. His work Black Cube 2, Hajj, and Water Kaaba are three examples.)

The color transition from white to black is also possibly connected to the Black Stone affixed to the Kaaba, which is said to have been "entrusted to Abraham [by God]...as a white stone. It was whiter than paper, but became black from the sins of the children of Adam."
