= Ingeborg Lüscher =

German painter

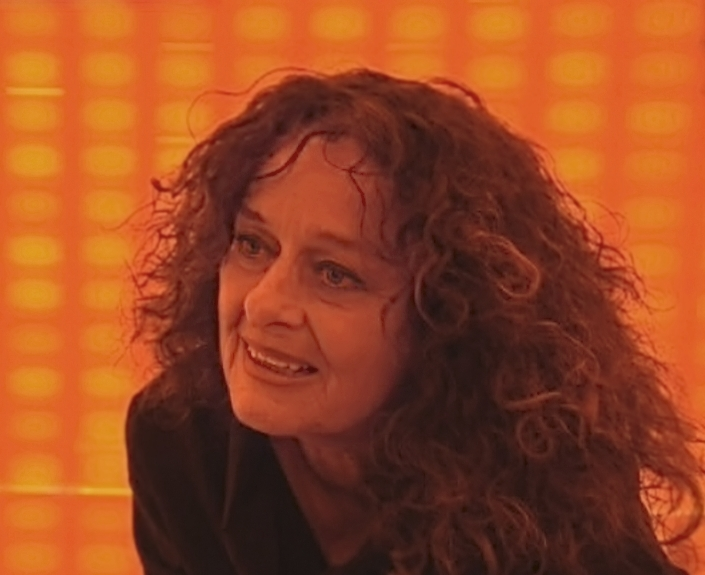
Ingeborg Lüscher (2008) in her Amber room, (Bernsteinzimmer)

Ingeborg Lüscher (born 22 June 1936 in Freiberg) is a German/Swiss artist, working with painting, sculpture, photography, installation and video. Her work has been exhibited in many institutional venues around the world, including the Musée d‘art moderne de la ville de Paris, the Centre d‘Art Contemporain in Geneva, the Kunstmuseum Luzern and the Hamburger Bahnhof in Berlin.

In 2011 she was awarded the Meret Oppenheim Prize.

Since 1967 Lüscher works and lives in Tegna, Ticino, Switzerland.

She was first married to the Swiss psychotherapist Max Lüscher, then to the Swiss curator and art historian Harald Szeemann.

== Books ==
- Ingeborg Lüscher: Dokumentation über Armand Schulthess Der grösste Vogel kann nicht fliegen. Cologne: DuMont Schauberg, 1972. ISBN 3-7701-0651-2
- Ingeborg Lüscher: Erlebtes und Erdäumeltes einander zugeordnet. Oumansky-Preis, Fantonigrafica, Venice, 1975
- Ingeborg Lüscher: Die Angst des Ikarus oder Hülsenfrüchte sind Schmetterlingsblütler. Aarau; Frankfurt; Salzburg; Sauerländer 1982. ISBN 3-7941-2275-5
- Ingeborg Lüscher: AVANT–APRES/Sheer Prophecy–True Dreams, centre d’art contemporain, Geneva, 1980
- Ingeborg Lüscher: Der unerhörte Tourist–Laurence Pfautz. Aarau; Frankfurt am Main; Salzburg; Sauerländer 1985. ISBN 3-7941-2712-9 (nur erhältlich bei Buchhandlung Libri & Arte in Locarno-Muralto)
- Ingeborg Lüscher and Adolf Muschg (Text): Japanische Glückszettel. Suhrkamp Insel Verlag 1996. ISBN 3-458-16814-1
- Ingeborg Lüscher: Zaubererfotos/Magician Photos, JRP-Ringier, Zurich, 2010, ISBN 9783037641033

== Literature ==
- MANUALE, A reference book about the works of Ingeborg Lüscher, Samuel Herzog (text), Niggli 1999, ISBN 3-7212-0354-2
- Viveri polifonici - Exhibition catalogue Ingeborg Lüscher, Museum Mart, Rovereto, Skira, 2004. ISBN 3-8884-9185-1 (texts in Italian and English by Antonio d’Avossa, Thomas McEvilley, Leila Kais and Juri Steiner)
- Lass einen Zweig von weißem Flieder in Südafrika - Exhibition catalogue Ingeborg Lüscher, Museum Wiesbaden, 14. Mai - 23. Juli 2006. Wiesbaden 2006. ISBN 3-89258-066-9 (texts in German and English by Renate Petzinger, Hanne Dannenberger and Volker Rattemeyer)
- Das Licht und die Dunkelheit knapp unter den Füssen, Exhibition catalogue Ingeborg Lüscher, Kunstmuseum Solothurn, 2016. ISBN 3-90300-492-8 (texts in German and English by Patricia Bieder, Hans-Joachim Müller, Michele Robecchi and Christoph Vögele)
