= Jaime Gili =

British painter (born 1972)

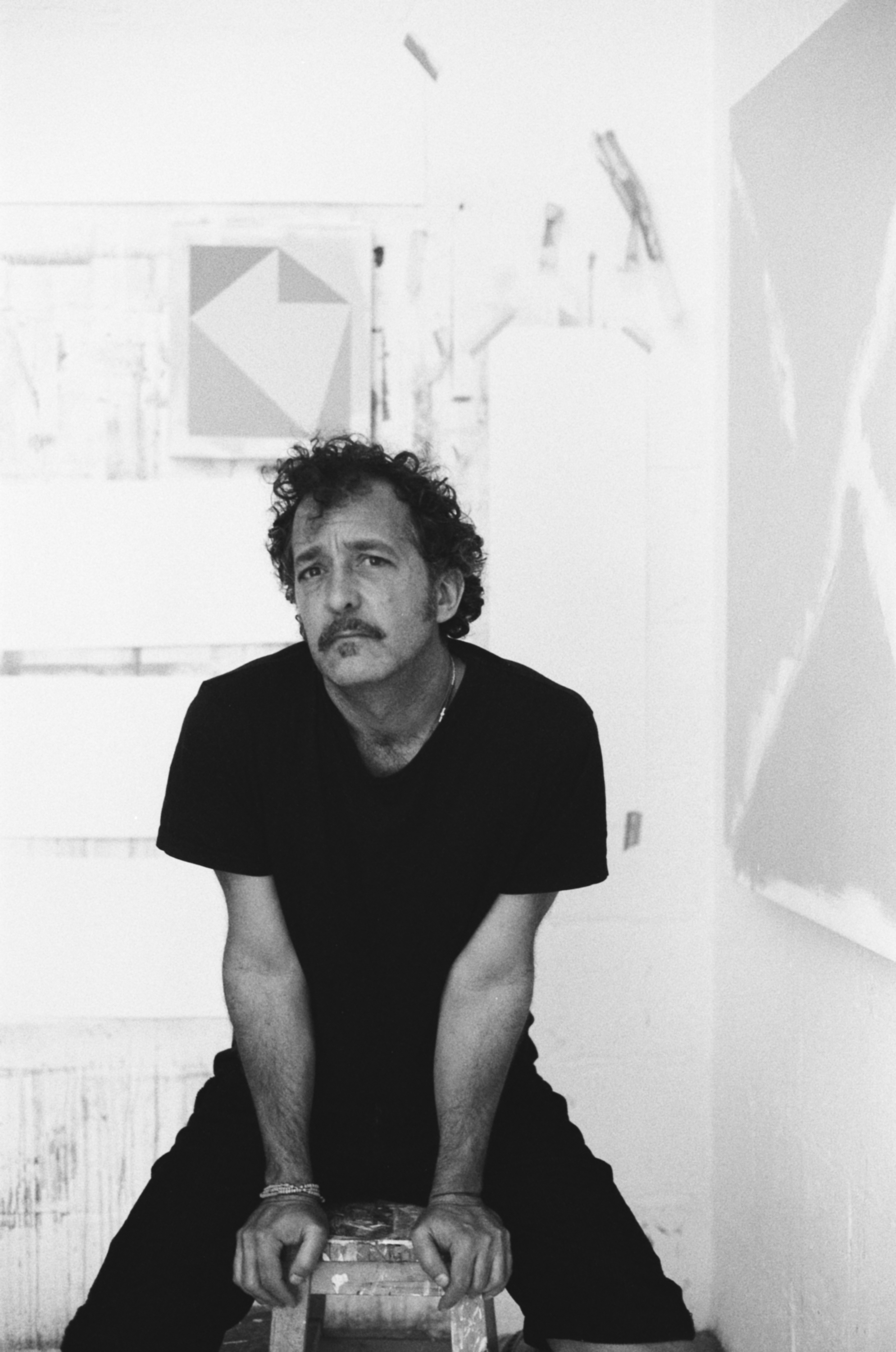
- Born: 1972 (age 53–54); Caracas, Venezuela
- Education: Royal College of Art, London. Universitat de Barcelona, Barcelona. Prodiseño, Caracas
- Occupation: visual artist
- Spouse: Lucía Pizzani

Jaime Gili (born in 1972, in Caracas) is a visual artist. He has been based in London since 1996.

== Education ==
After finishing secondary school in Caracas, he went on to study at IDD, Instituto de Diseño Fundación Neumann, in Caracas, an institution of historical importance which by then was in decline following Venezuela's downfall. When IDD closed, branching into a new school called Prodiseño, Gili continued studying and became one of its founding members. In 1990 he moved to Barcelona to complete a degree in Fine Arts (1990–1995) at University of Barcelona, where he also completed a PhD years later (1998–2001). In 1998 he moved to London, having won a scholarship at the Royal College of Art to complete an MA in painting. He has since settled in the United Kingdom. During his academy years he proudly took part in two Erasmus Programme exchanges, to continue studies in École des Beaux-Arts, Paris and Berlin's HdK, Berlin University of the Arts in the nineties. His main tutors throughout the years include Eugenio Espinoza and Fanny Krivoy in Caracas (1989-1990), Joan Hernández Pijuan and Joaquim Chancho in Barcelona (1992–1995), Claude Viallat in Paris (1994), and Peter Doig, Vanessa Jackson, John Dougill, Jo Stockham and Paul Huxley in London (1996–1998).

== Career ==
Throughout his career, Jaime Gili has developed the universal abstract language of the mid-20th Century from its Latin-American utopian rubble, into contemporary painting. More specifically, his work has been contextualised as a critical revision of Latin American abstraction, especially the Venezuelan optical and kinetic work of artists such as Carlos Cruz-Diez and Alejandro Otero, with an input from what had been left out, popular art and urban energy. The recent history of his native Venezuela has been present in his works in his exhibitions, notably in London at Cecilia Brunson Projects (Guarimba, 2017 and Loop, 2022) and in New York at Henrique Faría Fine Art (The dark paintings, 2018). The Venezuelan poet Adalber Salas Hernández described Gili’s Dark Paintings as ‘a geometry in ruins’.

Critic Fisun Guner wrote in 2003 about his show at the Jerwood Space: "What do you get when you mix Pop Art, Minimalism, Vorticism, Futurism and graffiti art? The answer may well resemble the work of (...) Jaime Gili." Venezuelan Curator Jesús Fuenmayor wrote in 2006 for the catalogue of Gili's show at Periférico Caracas that his paintings were "as if someone had thrown a bomb at a work by Carlos Cruz-Diez". Swiss curator Oliver Kielmayer, wrote in 2009 "Jaime Gili seems to combine the wilderness of the jungle with a formalist and reductionist artistic language; the result is a kind of Gesamtkunstwerk, a crystalline pulsating organism that almost comes alive."

Gili has taken part in several colaborational and experimental projects, such as Caracas:Reset, curated by Rolando Carmona, at La Colonie (Art Space), Paris in 2018. In 2004 he was invited by curator Paul O´Neill "Paul O´Neill". to be part of the experimental exhibition "Coalesce" at the London Print Studio, together with artists Kathrin Bohm and Eduardo Padilha. The experimental exhibition, "an evolutionary, cumulative, exhibition project", is a research and practice into the possibility of an exhibition as a form of co-production between multiple agencies. The Coalesce series has had seven iterations in twenty years, the most recent one in The Showroom, London, in 2024.

Gili has shown work internationally in many exhibitions including '6 Bienal do Mercosul' in Porto Alegre; 'Expander' at the Royal Academy of Arts in London; 'Las tres calaveras' at Periferico Caracas; 'Jump Cuts' at CIFO in Miami; 'The Complex of Respect' at Kunsthalle Bern; "Bill at Pittier" at Kunsthalle Winterthur and 'Indica', a show recreating the 1960s Indica Gallery at Riflemaker in London. Other recent exhibitions, in Miami, Caracas and London, he has also been invited to make several permanent works integrated into architecture. In Venezuela he completed "Diamante de las Semillitas", a work in Petare, a very high density informal city with a colonial core in the East of Caracas. He was also chosen to create a site-specific design for 16 large industrial storage tanks, in what would become one of the world's largest public art projects 260,000 square feet (24,000 m^{2}). Entitled "Art All Around", the event and work was produced by Maine Center for Creativity. The site is located along the Fore River in South Portland, Maine.
