= Gary Kuehn =

American artist (born 1939)

Gary Kuehn (born January 28, 1939, Plainfield, New Jersey) is an American artist who pioneered the Postminimal and Process Art movements of the 1960s.

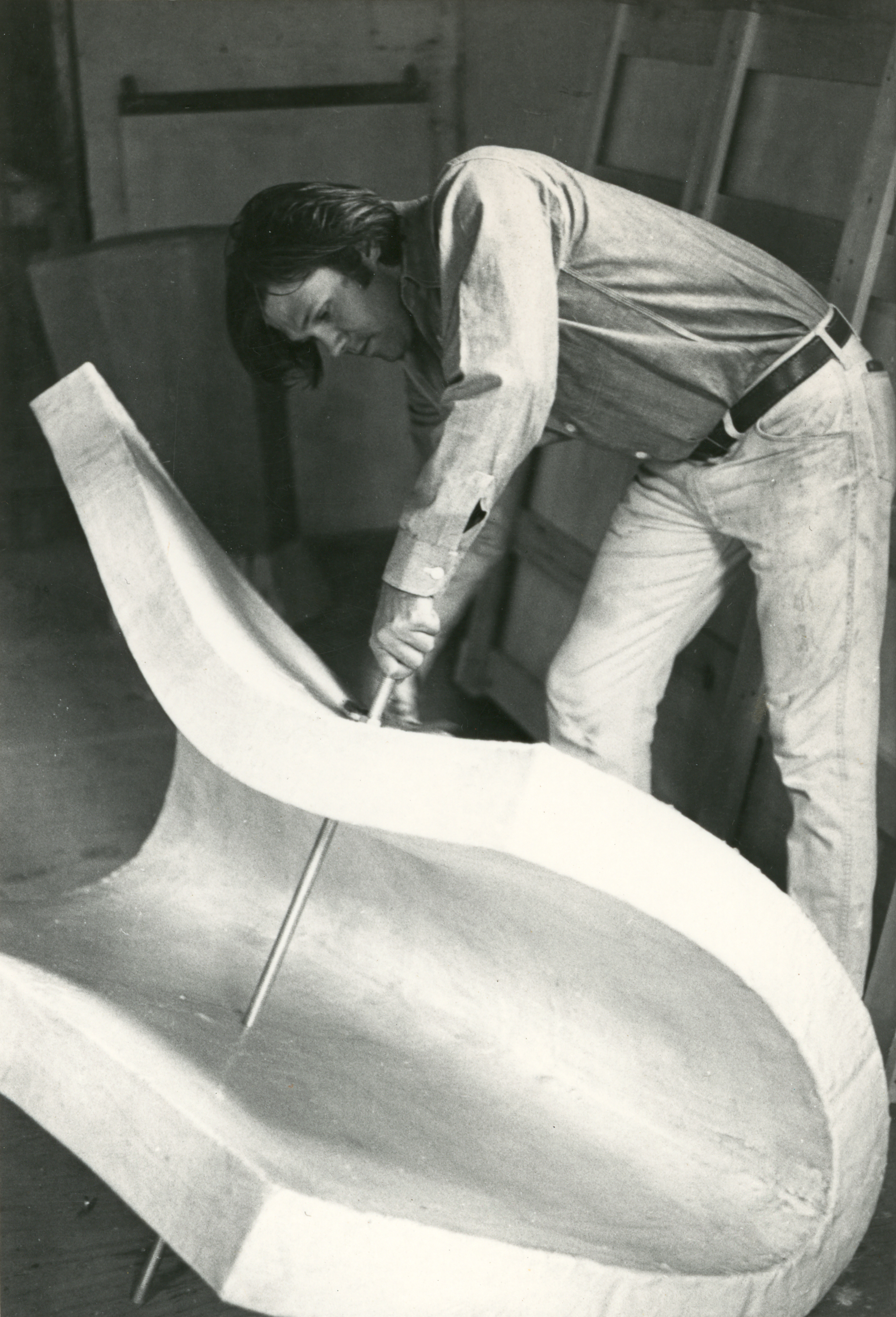
Gary Kuehn, studio view with Mattress Piece, 1969

== Life and career ==
Gary Kuehn was born in 1939 to working-class family. His father was a machinist and a member of the Communist Party during the McCarthy Era. After receiving his BFA in Art History at Drew University he was encouraged by his mentor George Segal to attend the newly formed MFA program at Rutgers University where he studied with Roy Lichtenstein, Allan Kaprow, and Geoffrey Hendricks. At that time Rutgers University was a hub for the Fluxus movement and Kuehn attended the very first happenings which took place at George Segal's farm in New Jersey. As a student, Kuehn produced a sculpture for the 1963 Yam Festival organized by George Brecht and Robert Watts in New Brusnswick, New Jersey and in 1964 he choreographed a performance at the Hardware Poets Playhouse in New York.

During the 1950s and 60s, Kuehn worked as a roofer and iron worker on large scale construction sites. Kuehn's experience as a construction worker was formative in the development of his work, and shaped his relationship to the physicality of raw materials. Kuehn states, "I once witnessed an accident on a construction site where concrete spilled when we were building a foundation. The wood structure broke and concrete poured and poured out of the sides and bottom. I thought it was amazing. I was struck by how this geometric structure collapsed and the concrete spilled out over the landscape. I posit geometry as the expression of the ideal, the pinnacle of rational thinking, and a source of authority..."

Kuehn's work was included in the groundbreaking exhibition Eccentric Abstraction curated by Lucy Lippard in 1966 at the Fischbach Gallery in New York. Considered the first Postminimal art exhibition, Eccentric Abstraction brought together artists including Eva Hesse, Keith Sonnier, and Bruce Nauman who were subverting the rigid hard-edge Minimalism that was dominant at the time.

Kuehn's work was also included in the seminal exhibition Live In Your Head: When Attitudes Become Form curated by Harald Szeemann in 1969 at the Kunsthalle Bern, which traveled to Museum Haus Lange, Krefeld and Institute of Contemporary Arts, London, and was re-staged in 2013 at the Fondazione Prada, Milan.

In 1967 after seeing Kuehn's work at an exhibition at Bianchini Gallery in New York, Kuehn was invited to Kassel, Germany by the art dealer Rolf Ricke to create new work for Kuehn's first European solo exhibition, "Gary Kuehn: Zeichnungen und Mini-Objekte." This began a lifelong friendship and working relationship with Ricke and prompted Kuehn to live in Germany for several periods throughout the 1960s, 70s, and 80s. In 1977 Kuehn exhibited in Documenta 6, Kassel and in 1980 he was awarded the DAAD (German Academic Exchange Service) Fellowship in Berlin.

Gary Kuehn has held a teaching positions at the School of Visual Arts, New York and the Hochschule Fur Bildende Kunste in Braunschweig, Germany. He taught for 40 years at Rutgers University and holds the title Distinguished Professor of Art Emeritus.
His first museum retrospective "Between Sex and Geometry" opened at the Kunstmuseum Liechtenstein in September 2014 followed by the 2018 retrospective exhibition "Practitioner's Delight" at the Galleria d'Arte Moderna e Contemporane in Bergamo, Italy. He is represented by Haeusler Contemporary Gallery in Munich and Zurich.

In 2024, Gary Kuehn participated in Without Stars 2, and exhibition that took place at the Experimental Exhibition Room of the Museum of fine Arts of Caracas, the show was completely illuminated with emergency lamps and included a temporary facsimile recreation of the original Mattress Piece from 1964 with authorization by the artist. The exhibition included Kishio Suga, Meyer Vaisman, Annette Lemieux, Eduardo Azuaje and Mario Pérez who also curated the project.

== Work ==
His work is known for its fluid use of materials that undermined the psychology of dominant Minimal Art practices. Using a straightforward and reduced formal language, Kuehn subverts pure geometric forms with content-driven, metaphorical concepts. David Komary states, "The works seem like excerpts of a process, sequence, or chain of events that enacted through or by means of the given sculptural object. Kuehn's focus is a concept of art that enables him to explore questions of geometry and form while also reflecting on and sculpturally negotiating aspects of expression, human experience, and self-perception. His aesthetic approach is based on a certain idea about rationality- not in a formal or compositional sense but in a manner analogous to human and interpersonal experiences - which he understands as the relationship of objects to one another and their potential means of expression or attitudes."

Although Kuehn works with a wide range of materials, the unifying theme throughout his discursive practices is a tension between forms as evident in his Black Paintings and Melt Pieces. In 1992 when he received the Francis J. Greenburger Foundation Award, George Segal wrote about the “rule-breaking” in Kuehn's work and said, “Artists [like Kuehn] who don’t fit comfortably into art historical categories have a terrible time.” Kuehn's refusal to produce trademarked work explains why he was "unfairly sidelined by history" according to art historians such as Thomas Crow.

== Public collections ==
- Albertina, Vienna, Austria
- Bonn Städtisches Kunst Museum, Bonn, Germany
- Bristol-Meyers Squibb Corporation
- Continental Corporation, New York, New York and Cranbury, New Jersey
- Denver Museum of Art, Denver, Colorado
- First Bank of Minneapolis, Minneapolis, Minnesota
- Hamburger Bahnhof, Museum für Gegenwart, Staatliche Museen zu Berlin, Germany
- Kröller-Müller Museum, Otterlo, the Netherlands
- Kunstmuseum St. Gallen, Switzerland
- Kunstmuseum Liechtenstein, Vaduz, Liechtenstein
- Ludwig Forum für Internationale Kunst, Aachen, Germany
- Lehmbruck Museum, Duisburg, Germany
- Mark Twain Bancshares, St. Louis, Missouri
- Museum of Modern Art, Quito, Ecuador
- Museum Ludwig, Cologne, Germany
- Museum of Modern Art, New York, New York
- Museum Abteiberg, Mönchengladbach, Germany
- Museum Haus Konstruktiv, Zürich
- Museum Morsbroich, Leverkusen, Germany
- Museum Moderner Kunst, Frankfurt, Germany
- Museum of Modern Art, Vienna, Austria
- Neuer Berliner Kunstverein
- Neues Museum Nürnberg, Germany
- New Jersey State Museum, Trenton, New Jersey
- Newark Museum, Newark, New Jersey
- Sammlung Fried, Ulmer Museum, Ulm, Germany
- Staatliche Graphische Sammlung München
- Städtisches Museum, Leverkusen, Germany
- Staatsgalerie Stuttgart, Germany
- Stedelijk Museum, Amsterdam, Netherlands
- Von Der Heydt Museum, Germany
- Wadsworth Atheneum, Hartford, Connecticut
- Weatherspoon Art Gallery, U.N.C., Greensboro, North Carolina
- Whitney Museum of American Art, New York, New York
