= Henry Vincent (artist) =

American artist

Henry Vincent (born 1966 in Eastpointe, Michigan) is an American conceptual artist based in Los Angeles, California, and Dawson City, Yukon.

== Early life and education ==
Vincent enrolled at the University of California, San Diego in 1984, where, according to his biography, he encountered figures including Robert Irwin, Bruce Nauman, and Nam June Paik. He later earned an MFA in printmaking from Columbia University in 1994.

== Career ==
While studying at UCSD, Vincent organized a solo exhibition of Ed Ruscha’s work in his apartment, which also functioned as a gallery. He subsequently operated a private museum, Art Center Los Angeles, situating himself within an artist-led Los Angeles community characterized by experimentation and social engagement as well as traditional exhibition practices. After relocating to Berlin in 2006, Vincent established connections with artists such as André Butzer, Jonathan Meese, and Andreas Hofer. An invitation from Reinald Nohal then led him to Dawson City in the Yukon. In 2010, a meeting with gold prospector Shawn Ryan significantly influenced the direction of his life and work, culminating in the founding of O.K. Creek Mining and Exploration in 2013. This shareholder-supported mining venture operates simultaneously as a business, artwork, critique, and extended social sculpture. Since that time, Vincent’s practice has evolved into a lifelong "gesamtkunstwerk," including James Rosenquist-inspired paintings incorporating gold, hyperreal drawings, and watercolors depicting Yukon life, and hand-cast gold jewelry representing erotic and symbolic motifs. Vincent's trajectory is distinguished by his transformation of gold into both a material and a metaphysical medium, regarding it not solely as a form of wealth but as a vehicle for myth, desire, violence, history, and artistic inquiry.

Over the course of his career, Vincent has worked across painting, installation, film, and collaborative project-based practices. His work has been exhibited at venues including the Museo Nacional Centro de Arte Reina Sofía, the Ludwig Museum, the MAK Center for Art and Architecture, and the Seville Biennial curated by Harald Szeemann. He has appeared in films by Jason Rhoades, Una Szeemann, and Raymond Pettibon alongside Kim Gordon, Paul McCarthy, and Lawrence Weiner, among others.

Vincent has presented solo exhibitions in Los Angeles, Santa Monica, Paris, Berlin, and Miami Beach. Listed solo projects include exhibitions at Fred Hoffman Gallery, Jack Glenn Gallery, Kantor Gallery, Patrick Painter Gallery, and Wonderloch Kellerland Gallery, as well as an installation at Art Basel Miami Beach.

His work is collected by the Museum of Contemporary Art, Los Angeles.
