= Live In Your Head: When Attitudes Become Form =

Art exhibition

- Artists installing their work in the exhibition, Live In Your Head: When Attitudes Become Form, at the Kunsthalle Bern, 1969
- Date: March 22 – April 27, 1969
- Venue: Kunsthalle Bern
- Location: Bern, Switzerland
- Type: art exhibition
- Theme: Postminimal art, Process art, Arte Povera
- Organised by: Harald Szeemann

Live In Your Head: When Attitudes Become Form was an exhibition at the Kunsthalle Bern curated by the Swiss curator, Harald Szeemann, in 1969. The show is considered a groundbreaking landmark for Postminimalist and Arte Povera work which, according to The New York Times, was "arguably the most famous exhibition of new art of the postwar era."

The exhibition redefined the role of the curator in relation to artists – as a partnership. The exhibition included 127 works by 69 artists (three of whom were women) from Western Europe and the United States. The artists constructed their works on site within the gallery spaces of the Kunsthalle. Many of their works were process-oriented. A selection of artists from the show include Eva Hesse, Gary Kuehn, Robert Smithson, Alighiero Boetti, Joseph Beuys, Bruce Nauman, Hanne Darboven, Mario Merz, Hans Haacke among others. The exhibition enabled Szeemann to redefine his role as an independent curator working outside of the constraints of an institution.

== Exhibition catalog ==
The Kunsthalle produced a catalog, When Attitudes Become Form: Works-Concepts-Processes-Situations-Information, with a unique die-cut alphabetically tabbed index bound with hardware-fittings for the individual artists. In Notes on the New, an essay in the exhibition catalog, Scott Burton writes: "Art has been veritably invaded by life, if life means flux, change, chance, time, unpredictability." The exhibition catalog also contained writings by Grégoire Müller, Tommaso Trini and Szeemann himself.

== Legacy ==
In 2003, the Walker Art Center mounted an exhibition curated by Philippe Vergne, Douglas Fogle and Olukemi Ilesanmi titled, How Latitudes Become Forms: Art in a Global Age. The curators "trace the genealogy" of their exhibit to the 1969 show by Szeeman, as they saw that exhibition as a model for a new form of international exhibitions where the curator becomes a co-participatory "author" of the process of art-making within site specific contexts. The show at the Walker represented a more globally diverse range of practitioners than the show in Bern, and included more women. The show catalog was also bound with hardware fittings.

In 2013, Germano Celant, who had met with Szeemann at the time of the original exhibition and even did a brief oral presentation during the opening night in Bern, recreated the show in its entirety. The exhibition was presented at the Fondazione Prada in Ca’ Corner della Regina, Venice, Italy during the opening week of the Venice Biennale. Celant chose to co-organize the exhibition together with Rem Koolhaas, who helped recreating the original setting in Bern, and artist and photographer Thomas Demand.
