= Ivo Ringe =

German artist

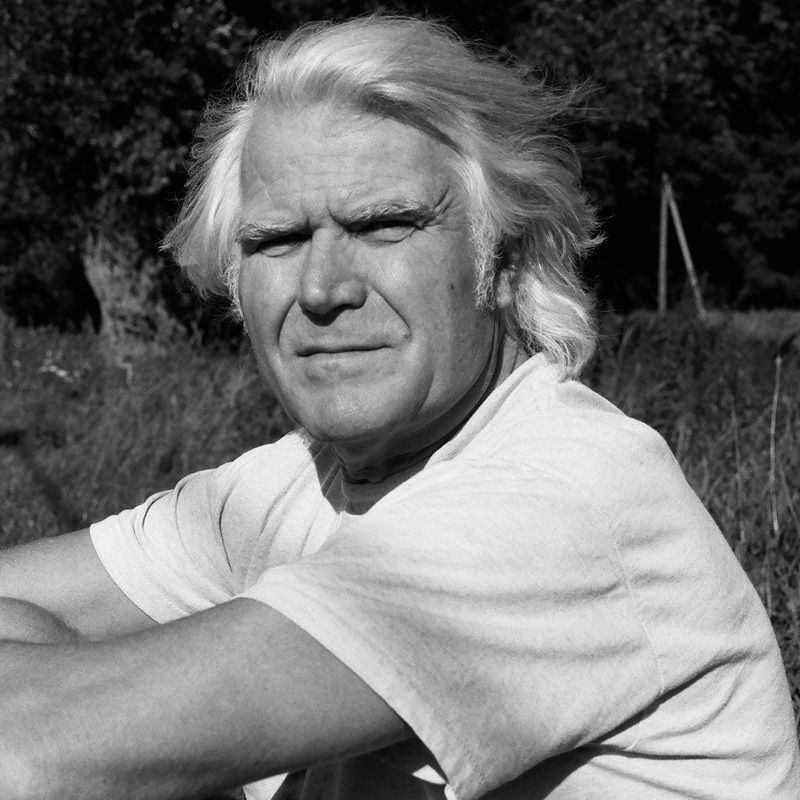
- Picture of the artist Ivo Ringe
- Born: 5 July 1951 (age 75); Bonn, North Rhine-Westphalia, Germany
- Known for: Abstract painting
- Movement: Concrete art
- Spouse: Heather Sheehan
- Website: ivoringe.com

Ivo Ringe (born 5 July 1951) is a German artist and curator. His painting has been classified as minimalism, geometric abstraction, concrete art, and hard-edge painting. Ringe lives and works in Cologne, Germany. He is a member of the Deutscher Künstlerbund (Association of German Artists).

== Biography ==
Ringe was born on 5 July 1951 in Bonn, Germany, to Erich and Edith Ringe (née Kleemann). His father was an inventor and his mother, a survivor of the Ravensbrück concentration camp. Ringe grew up in a refugee camp between the villages of Vilich and Schwarzrheindorf, in the district of Bonn.

At age 15, Ringe left home by himself and travelled to Paris, France, where he lived on the streets and learned painting and screen printing. During the late 1960s, Ringe designed and printed posters for local theatres, clubs, and musicians.

From 1972 to 1977, Ringe studied at the Kunstakademie Düsseldorf under Joseph Beuys and Rolf Sackenheim, from whom he received his master-student degree.

A 1992 fire in his studio in Cologne, Germany, destroyed many of his works.

In 2011, Ringe became an adjunct professor with the studio for fine arts ("Atelier für Bildende Kunst") at the Rheinische Friedrich-Wilhelms-Universität Bonn; and from 2014 until 2025, he was the studio’s artistic director..

Ringe lives and works in Cologne, Germany, and is married to the American artist, Heather Sheehan. At age 32, he began the practice of Transcendental Meditation.

== Artwork ==
Ringe’s artistic practice includes painting, works on paper, photography, screen printing, etching, and sculptural reliefs.

Throughout his career, Ringe’s work has been influenced by distinct aesthetic and cultural experiences. Criss-crossing Europe alone as a teenager, he followed the path of M. C. Escher to the Alhambra in Spain and was inspired by the powerful sensory effect of its formal and ornamental tessellations. As a young artist, he was influenced by Henri Matisse’s use of straightforward shapes and the interaction of colours and forms.

Ringe’s painting has been described as minimal art, akin to Imi Knoebel and Blinky Palermo, who were also Beuys’ students. Distinct in his work, however, is the balance of the geometry and spatial awareness of nature’s organic proportions with the expressive sensuality of gestural and colour field painting. It is through this concentrated tension that the exceptional energy of the works is conveyed. His application of the golden ratio, as well as other mathematical and scientific proportions derived from ancient Sanskrit texts, gives structural harmony to his compositions.

The characteristic feature of Ringe’s paintings is the precisely balanced colours, which are gesturally painted in broad strokes that stretch across the canvas in a net-like manner, creating irregular triangles and quadrangles.

Art critic Thomas Micchelli notes that “Among the more intriguing aspects of Ringe’s work is the thoroughness of its self-analysis: nothing, not even randomness, is done without a reason.”

Ringe’s paintings have been a source of inspiration for other artists. In 2015, Eugen Gomringer, the founder of concrete poetry, wrote a sonnet about Ringe’s work. Ringe responded to the sonnet with the creation of four screen prints. In 2020, the vocalist and songwriter, Amy Antin, released a song expressing the impact of Ivo Ringe's works.

Since 1976, Ringe’s work has been exhibited internationally in over 250 solo and group shows at galleries and museums. In his work as curator, he further establishes the phenomenon of the vibrational aspects of organic structures towards an expansion of the strict geometry in minimalism and concrete art. Ringe’s artwork is in notable European museum and gallery collections, as well as private and corporate art collections.
