= Heather Sheehan =

American artist (born 1961)

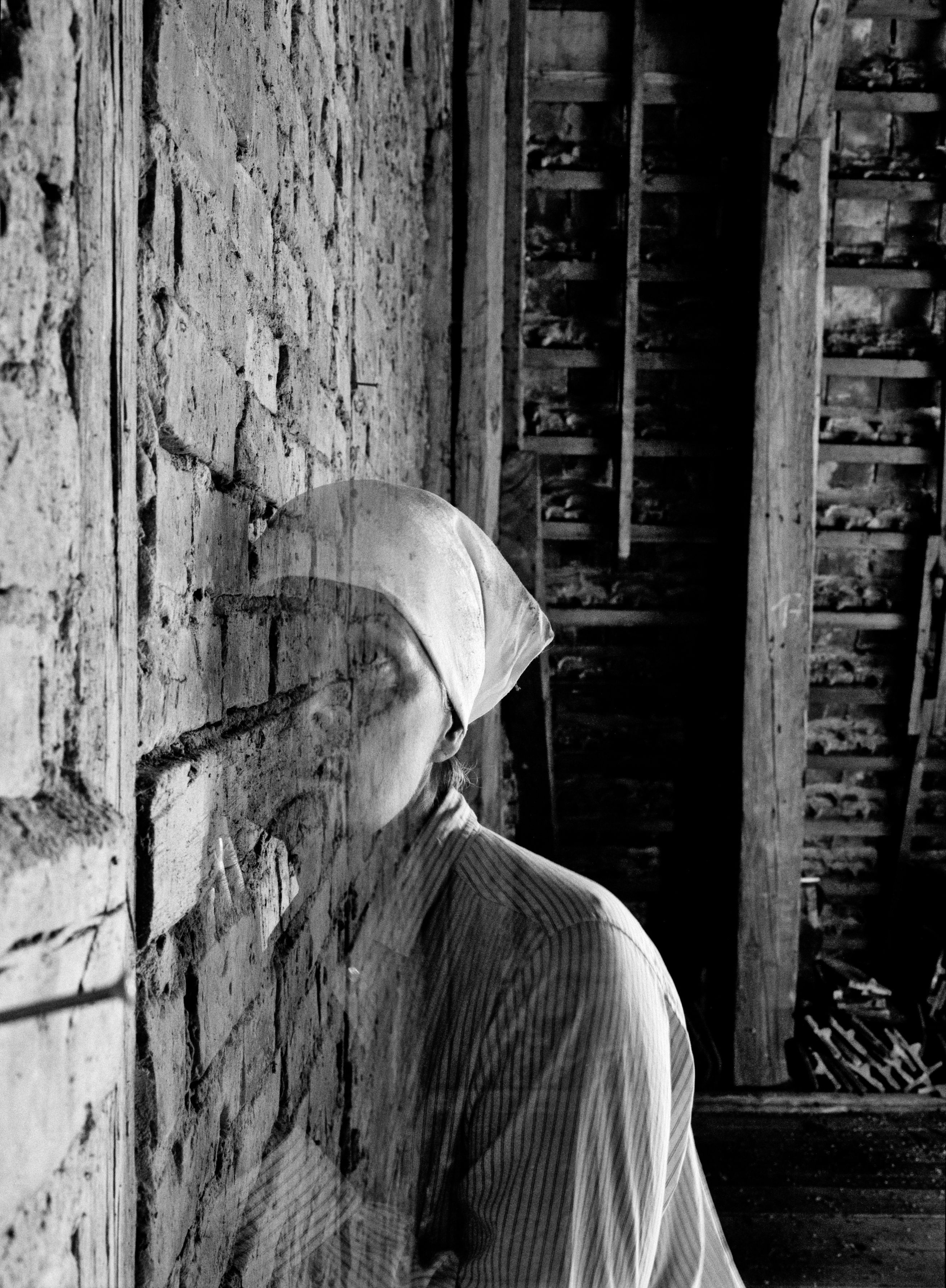
- Self-portrait 2016, With an Ear to the Past (black and white photography)
- Born: December 9, 1961 (age 64); Mount Vernon, New York, United States
- Known for: Installation, Performance, Black and White Photography, Video art, Sculpture
- Movement: Performance art, video art, fiber art
- Spouse: Ivo Ringe
- Website: heathersheehan.com

Heather Sheehan (born December 9, 1961 in Mount Vernon, New York) is an American artist and author. She lives and works in Cologne, Germany. Her work juxtaposes literary and visual art forms. Sheehan’s focus is on the development of individual mythologies, which are presented in multimedia and transmedial forms, often combining black and white self-portrait photography, performance art and fiber art.

== Education, career and personal life ==
Sheehan grew up in Southern Connecticut. In high school, she was introduced to the medium of fiber arts through her teacher, Anne Levine.

Sheehan studied at the Parsons School of Design and the New School of Social Research in New York. From 1981 to 1983, she studied textile science and women's tailoring at the Fashion Institute of Technology at the State University of New York.

Sheehan lived and worked on Christopher Street in New York City from 1983 to 1990. In 1994, she emigrated to Cologne, Germany. Sheehan is married to the artist Ivo Ringe.

== Artwork and artist books ==
=== Fiber art ===
Since 1996, Sheehan has produced several notable works of art using textiles, including Universal Mother, single opening, Soulfood and Visitors and other Beings. Her fiber art works are mainly constructed from sewn textiles or wool felt and also appear as central components in works of assemblage. The sculptural objects may stand alone in relation to the location where they are installed, but may also feature as prop objects in Sheehan's works of performance.

Universal Mother

For Universal Mother (1996), Sheehan hand-stitched several larger than life-sized, merino wool felt abstracted figurative objects and rubbed them with powder pigments or Vaseline. In 1997, the series was installed in a former prince’s bedroom within the baroque style residential castle and contemporary art museum of Arolsen Castle. The experiential environment featured a sculptural trio that questions the power roles within the concept of an archetypal family. A catalogue of the artist's sketches and writings in English and German, as well as photographs of all works in situ, accompanied the exhibition. In the 1996 precursor to the exhibition, the artist performed to soothe, with a felt and Vaseline wall relief using a vacuum cleaner and razor.

single opening

In 1999, Sheehan devised a pseudo scientific multimedia and transmedial installation work titled, single opening. The artwork is fixated around a video in which Sheehan performs in the costumed role of a character named Professor Dr. Nurse, and lectures on her experiments to revive a fictitious monotreme mammal. Sheehan wrote the English and German script using phrasing taken from actual genetic science news reporting. She sarcastically caricatures obscure research topics and our amateurish ideas about the possibilities of genetic engineering and its economic advantages. The prop-objects for the series, sewn from wool felt and slathered with Vaseline, are housed in crude incubators sewn from transparent plastic, and provided with feeding tubes. Soft and slimy, they appear to be creatures, incomplete, or still in the process of maturing. For the exhibition Under the Skin - Biological Transformations in Contemporary Art at the Lehmbruck Museum in 2001, Sheehan installed the work in a laboratory breeding station/classroom. The video was later provided with Polish subtitles, and is in the collection of the Museum of Contemporary Art in Kraków (MOCAK)

Soulfood

For the exhibition Soulfood (2003) at the Fuhrwerkswaage in Cologne, she installed the ingredients for 2000 kg of rice pudding in triangular formation: two open cubes together with one hanging sack; ingredients not only for a comfort food for children and adults, but essential to basic nutrition of large portions of the world's population. The key ingredient, milk, was not supplied. The exhibition opened following a week of World Food Programme airdrop assistance to Afghanistan.

Visitors and other Beings

From 2004 through 2011 Sheehan developed a series called, Visitors and other Beings, featuring sewn and needle-sculpted plush textile figures, varying in size from very large to miniature. The figures are intended to be benevolent beings with facial and bodily expressions that reflect a spectrum of human emotions and experiences.

=== Individual Mythologies ===
Sheehan has created several thematic artworks and artist books that deal with Individual Mythologies, a term used by Swiss curator, artist, and art historian Harald Szeemann, which refers to a working method of those artists who create works of art based on their subjective inner perception, addressing recurring events in human life, such as birth and death, in their mythological qualities. Sheehan has produced such works in multimedia and transmedial projects, including her solo exhibition alighting, the performance cycle SeamStress, and the two exhibitions including artist books, Sharpless, Margaret, and Sylta, the Whaling Widow Who Wails.

alighting

For the 2015 exhibition alighting at Kunstverein Augsburg, in Augsburg, Germany, Sheehan created a video, in which two themes from the history of the medieval city are reflected, namely textile art and the River Lech, which flows through Augsburg. Black-and-white self-portrait sequences, photographed and staged by Sheehan between 2012 and 2015, and two performances with a monumental fiber art object are central to the exhibition.

SeamStress

Inspired by her annual stays (2012-2023) at the historic manor house, the Mecklenburg Artists’ House, Schloss Plüschow, Germany, Sheehan developed the 2017 performance cycle, SeamStress. Sheehan built a textile factory in the attic of the house. By negotiating the position of a worker woman – literally – in her own body, in a performance, Sheehan brings the repressed past into the present, making it discussable and experiential: "She invites observers into the innermost sanctums of the life of a woman – and women throughout the ages – instructing through physicality the role women have played throughout history. In industrial society, women often struggled to make ends meet, and they did so through humiliating and excruciating work."

Sharpless, Margaret

At the Milton Art Bank, in Milton, Pennsylvania, Sheehan created the photographic narrative Sharpless, Margaret, about a fictitious spinster bookkeeper working at the bank in the year 1918.

In preparation for the analogue self-portrait photo shoot, Sheehan sewed a costume from historical patterns of the period, including an Edwardian corset, and grew her hair for two years in order to cut it on-camera for the dramatic turning point in the narrative. On location in January 2020, sleeping in the bank, Sheehan stepped into character and captured images of herself portraying Margaret's everyday life before, during, and after she suffers a breakdown. Two video compositions were made. The artist also wrote a first person text, a letter, presented as if written by her illegitimate son, Thomas to the insane asylum holding his mother, pleading for her release at a time when families had been forever separated due to war and the Spanish Flu.

Sharpless, Margaret, The Ledger of, published by MAB Books in 2021 was introduced during the multimedia and transmedial exhibition. In the book, the letter appears hidden among the complete sequence of over seventy black-and-white self-portrait photographs.

Sylta, the Whaling Widow Who Wails

Sheehan’s 2024 project Sylta, the Whaling Widow Who Wails took place at two locations of the Sölring Museums, the Sylt Museum and The Old Frisian House on the North Sea island of Sylt. The narrative describes the experiences of a fictional character named Sylta who is the widow of a wealthy whaler who died during a whaling voyage. For the project, Sheehan created a period-style costume and photographed herself inside the rooms within the Old Frisian House.

In the accompanying short story, Meeting Sylta, Sheehan recounts how her concept for this project took shape and the extent to which she had to come to terms with herself in order to face the tragic story of the whalers' pregnant widow.

During the exhibition, Sheehan read several passages from the short story. Alexander Römer, director of the Sölring Museums, describes the impact of the exhibition and readings, as "A new form of exhibition at the Sylt Museum yet one that attracted considerable attention beyond the island's borders and received gratifying acclaim, while at the same time challenging and inspiring visitors to approach the historical theme in unexpected ways.”

== Exhibitions and collections ==
Sheehan’s work has been exhibited internationally by museums and galleries. Some notable exhibitions include, Universal Mother: Made for Arolsen, Museum Bad Arolsen, Bad Arolsen, Germany; Under the Skin - Biological Transformations in Contemporary Art, Lehmbruck Museum, Duisburg, Germany; alighting, Kunstverein Augsburg, in Augsburg, Germany; Heather Sheehan: Visitors and other beings, Stadtmuseum Siegburg, Siegburg, Germany und Stadtmuseum Beckum, Beckum, Germany; Sharpless, Margaret, Milton Art Bank, Milton, PA; and Sylta, the Whaling Widow Who Wails, die Walfängerwitwe, die weint, Sölring - Sylt Museum & Old Frisian House, Keitum, the island of Sylt, Germany.

Sheehan’s art is collected by notable institutions including Kunstmuseum Bonn, Germany; Museum of Contemporary Art in Kraków, Poland; and Stadtmuseum Siegburg, Germany. Germany. Sheehan’s artist books are included in the library collections of the Yale Library, the James Baldwin Library and the Art and Museum Library of the City of Cologne.

== Awards ==
- 2015 - 2016 MacDowell Colony Colony Fellowship, United States
- 2017 Guest artist at Schloss Plüschow, Germany

== Videography (selection) ==
- 1995: Performance: On Pink, 18′ 02″
- 1999: Single Opening, 08′ 15″
- 2003: Performance: Each&Every, 04′ 21″
- 2015: Performance: Alighting on the River, 14′ 32″
- 2015: Performance: Waterline/Receding, 05′ 11″
- 2018: Performance: I shot myself in Augsburg, 01′ 07″
- 2019: Burlap Poem video (2012–2019), 11′ 57″
- 2021: Hers is a Story, 04′ 06″
