= Grégoire Müller =

Swiss painter and writer (born 1947)

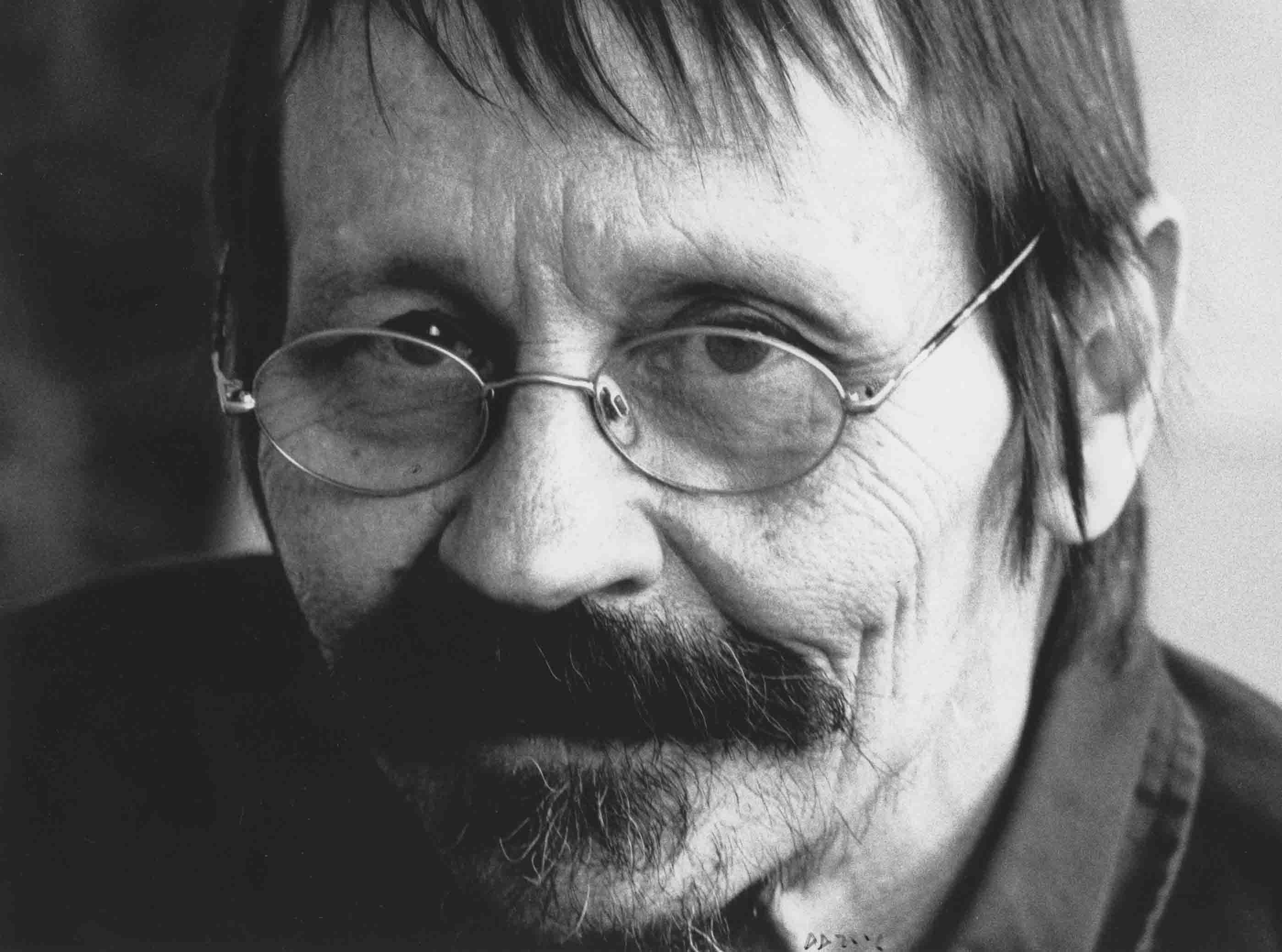
- Photographed by Daniel Domon
- Born: Morges, Switzerland

Grégoire Müller (born February 23, 1947) is a contemporary Swiss painter and writer, who lives in La Chaux-de-Fonds, Switzerland. His figurative paintings frequently explore current events and world news as documented on television and in print.

== Life ==
Grégoire Müller was born in the town of Morges, Switzerland. In the 1960s, he studied at the Académie de la Grande Chaumière in Paris while becoming acquainted with fellow artists Daniel Buren and Olivier Mosset. During that time he was in charge of the Art page in Pariscope and soon became a correspondent for Art and Artists (London) and Artsmagazine (New York). During the May 68 events Müller was arrested and imprisoned for three days, furthering his interest in counterculture. In 1968, he collaborated with Harald Szeemann on the legendary “When Attitudes become Form” exhibition. In 1969, he left Europe for New York.

In New York, Müller first worked as an assistant to Richard Serra and as a freelance critic before becoming the Editor-in-Chief of Artsmagazine. In that role, he published original contributions by some of the leading artists of the 20th Century, including Salvador Dalí, Robert Rauschenberg, Andy Warhol, Richard Serra, Walter De Maria, Sol LeWitt, Robert Smithson, and Vito Acconci.

In 1972, after the publication of his landmark book “The New Avant Garde” (Praeger Publishing, NY, Pall Mall, London and Alfieri, Milan), Müller began to focus exclusively on painting. Influenced by the work of Lucian Freud and Balthus, among others, he focused on figuration. His first major solo exhibition at Richard Bellamy’s Oil & Steel Gallery (1984) was reviewed by Michael Brenson for the New York Times. In 1986, Müller left New York with his wife, the singer songwriter Pascal, settling in La Chaux-de-Fonds in Switzerland.

In addition to exhibiting his work internationally, Müller has taught at the Haute Ecole d’Art (Neuchâtel) and at the Lycée Blaise Cendrars (La Chaux-de-Fonds).

== Work ==
Müller’s is a figurative painter, who received his early training in life drawing classes at the Académie de la Grande Chaumière in Paris. Over time, he has developed a style that embraces aesthetics found in both Neo-expressionism and Renaissance painting. Deeply involved in the American avant-garde movements of the 1960s, Müller’s understanding of how art can engage us physically is further rooted in Process Art and Minimalism. Since then, he has created works that initiate an immediate physical impact and are often thought of as being confrontational. By the mid-1970s, Müller began to isolate the figure in his compositions, evoking questions of existential angst and struggle. This notion was enhanced through the introduction of political content derived from newspaper images and television.

During the past decade, Müller has developed a new approach, working with oil and turpentine on black denim. Notwithstanding their darkness, his paintings are about light and dramatic chiaroscuro effects. Overall, Müller explores the unique ability of painting to bring images to our consciousness. The human body and face with all its emotional and psychological dimensions are central to his quest. In a broader sense, Müller’s work involves all of what we call Life, including current events, contemporary landscapes and objects.

Müller’s work is found in international museums and collections, including the Museum of Modern Art New York, The Aldrich Contemporary Art Museum, the Henry Art Gallery, Seattle, the Zurich Kunsthaus, Chase Manhattan Bank, and the Nationale Suisse Assurance and the Swiss Confederation. His exhibitions have been reviewed in the New York Times, Art in America, the New Yorker, ARTnews, Neue Zürcher Zeitung, L’Hebdo, Le Temps and other publications. He is prominently featured in the Dictionnaire de l'Art Suisse.

== Awards ==
- National Endowment for the Arts, Washington
- Joseph James Akston Foundation, New York
- Pollock – Krasner Foundation, New York
- Robert C. Scull Foundation, New York

== Works ==
- Battle Field, 2010, oil on canvas, 24 3/4 x 28 3/4 in.
- Burnt Forest, 2008, Oil on canvas, 86 3/4 x 52 inches (220 x 132 cm)
- Laughing Man, 2008, Oil on canvas, 20 1/2 x 19 3/4 inches (52 x 50 cm)
- Scavenger, 2010, Oil on canvas, 65 1/2 x 54 1/2 inches (166 x 138 cm)
- Candle, 2008, Oil on canvas, 23 x 14 3/4 inches (58.4 x 37.5 cm)
- Abu Ghraib, 2008, Oil on canvas, 75 x 54 1/2 inches (190.5 x 138.5 cm)

== Exhibitions ==
2011

- Jason McCoy Gallery, New York, NY

2009

- Espace Courant d’art, Porrentruy

2003

- Musée des Beaux Arts, Le Locle

2001

- Musée d’Art et d´Histoire, Neuchâtel

2000

- Galerie Numaga, Auvernier

1997

- E.S.F – Espace Saint-François, Lausanne

1993

- Jason McCoy Gallery, New York, NY
- Villa Turque – EBEL (Le Corbusier), La Chaux-de-Fonds
- Galerie Carzaniga + Uecker, Basel

1992

- Kunsthaus Zürich
- Fischlin Gallery, Geneva

1991

- Jason McCoy Gallery, New York, NY
- David Grob Gallery, London

1990

- University of Lausanne

1989

- Jason McCoy Gallery, New York, NY
- Palais de l’Athénée, Geneva

1988

- David Grob Gallery, London
- Galerie Carzaniga + Uecker, Basel

1987

- Jason McCoy Gallery, New York, NY
- Galerie Renée Ziegler, Zurich
- Artis Gallery, Monte Carlo

1986

- Musée des Beaux Arts, La Chaux-de-Fonds
- Gruenebaum Gallery New York

1984

- Oil & Steel Gallery, New York, NY

1977

- Kornblee Gallery, New York, NY

1976

- Galerie Jean Chauvelin, Paris
- Deitcher/O’Reilly Gallery, New York, NY

1975

- Deitcher/O’Reilly Gallery, New York, NY

== Collections ==
- Museum of Modern Art, NY
- Kunsthaus Zürich, Switzerland
- Musée des Beaux-Arts, La Chaux-de-Fonds, Switzerland
- Musée d’Art et d’Histoire, Neuchâtel, Switzerland
- Museo d’Arte di Lugano, Switzerland
- Collection of the Swiss Confederation, Bern, Switzerland
- Henry Art Gallery, Seattle, WA
- The Aldrich Contemporary Art Museum, CT
- Fondation Gotti, Museo d’Arte, Lugano
- Fondation du Château de Jau, France
- Chase Manhattan Bank, New York
- Prudential Insurance, New York
- Union Bank of Switzerland, New York
- Schweizerische Nationalversicherung, Basel
- UBS, New York

== Catalogues ==
- Grégoire Müller, New York: Jason McCoy Gallery, NY, 2011
- Grégoire Müller, polygraphie, Le Locle: Musée de Beaux-Arts, Le Locle, 2004
- Face à la peinture, Neuchâtel: Musée dárt et d´Historie de Neuchâtel, 2001
- Grégoire Müller: Recent Paintings, New York: Jason McCoy Gallery, 1989
- Grégoire Müller, essay by Donald B. Kuspit, London: David Grob Limited, 1988

== Books ==
- Grégoire Müller, Ramblings: art et survie à Manhattan, 1969–1986, Editions de l'Aire, 1997
- Grégoire Müller, New Avantgarde: Issues for the Art of the Seventies, Pall Mall Publishers, 1972
