= Harald Szeemann =

Swiss artist, curator and art historian (1933–2005)

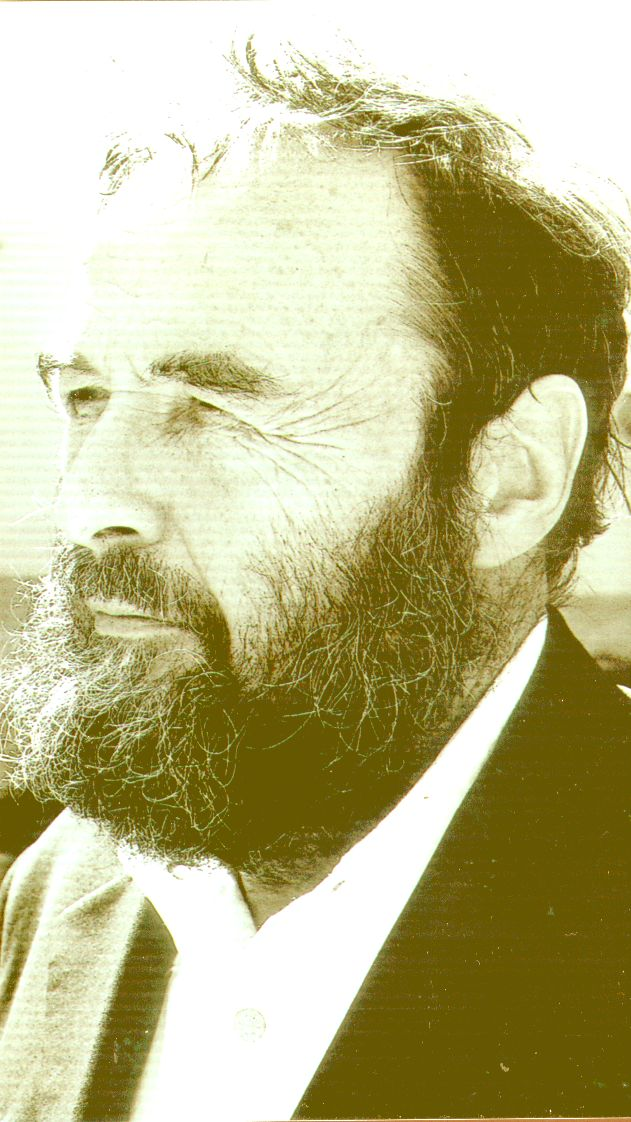
Harald Szeemann (2001)

Harald Szeemann (11 June 1933 – 18 February 2005) was a Swiss curator, artist, and art historian. Having curated more than 200 exhibitions, many of which have been characterized as groundbreaking, Szeemann is said to have helped redefine the role of an art curator. It is believed that Szeemann elevated curating to a legitimate art form itself.

== Personal life ==
Szeemann was born in Bern, Switzerland on June 11, 1933. He studied art history, archaeology and journalism in Bern and at the Sorbonne in Paris from 1953–60, and in 1956 to 1958 he began working as an actor, stage designer and painter, and produced many one-man shows. In 1958 he was married to Francoise Bonnefoy and in 1959 their son Jerome Patrice was born. In 1964 his daughter Valerie Claude was born. He was twice married, the second time to artist Ingeborg Lüscher. Their daughter is Una Szeemann.

Szeemann was hospitalized for pleural cancer in Locarno, Switzerland and died in 2005 at the age of 71 in the Ticino region.

== Curatorial career ==
Szeemann began organizing exhibitions in Switzerland in 1957, and in 1961 he was appointed as director of the Kunsthalle Bern at the age of 28. Despite being a somewhat "provincial institution" at the time Szeemann managed to open a new exhibition every month, often with young and promising artists.

There he organized an exhibition of works by the "mentally ill" from the collection of the art historian and psychiatrist Hans Prinzhorn in 1963, and in 1968 gave Christo and Jeanne-Claude their first opportunity to wrap an entire building: the Kunsthalle itself. The Kunsthalle Bern is also where Szeemann mounted his "radical" landmark 1969 exhibition "Live in Your Head: When Attitudes Become Form" that included works by artists including Eva Hesse and Gary Kuehn, which caused such a reaction that it prompted his resignation as Kunsthalle director.

For decades Szeemann worked out of a studio, which he referred to as "Fabbrica Rosa" or "Pink Factory", in the Swiss village Maggia, where he conceived international exhibitions and experimented with traditional museological practices. After leaving the Kunsthalle he founded the "Museum of Obsessions" and the Agentur für Geistige Gastarbeit ("Agency for Spiritual Migrant Work"). In 1972 he was the youngest artistic director at documenta 5 in Kassel. He revolutionised the concept: conceived as a hundred-day event, he invited the artists to present not only paintings and sculptures, but also performances and "happenings" as well as photography. The show had various sections named "Artist's Museum" or "Individual Mythologies". In an interview in June 2001, he explained: "All the former Documentas followed the old-hat, thesis/antithesis dialectic: Constructivism/Surrealism, Pop/Minimalism, Realism/Concept. That's why I invented the term, 'individual mythologies'—not a style, but a human right. An artist could be a geometric painter or a gestural artist; each can live his or her own mythology. Style is no longer the important issue." Artists of individual mythology are among others Armand Schulthess, Jürgen Brodwolf, Michael Buthe, James Lee Byars, the musician La Monte Young, Etienne Martin, Panamarenko, Paul Thek, Marian Zazeela, Horst Gläsker or Heather Sheehan.

For the 1980 Venice Biennale, he and Achille Bonito Oliva co-created the "Aperto", a new section in the Biennale for young artists. He was later selected as the Biennale director for both 1999 and 2001. This marked him as the first to curate both documenta and the Biennale. Until 2014, he was the only curator who had this distinction, which since the 2015 Venice Biennale is now shared with Okwui Enwezor.

From 1981 to 1991, Szeemann was a "permanent freelance curator" at the Kunsthaus Zürich. During this time, he also curated for other institutions including the Deichtorhallen Hamburg for its inaugural exhibition "Einleuchten: Will, Vorstel Und Simul In HH." In 1982 he commissioned a three-dimensional reconstruction of Kurt Schwitters's Hannover Merzbau (as photographed in 1933) for the exhibition "Der Hang zum Gesamtkunstwerk" in Zürich the following year. It was built by the Swiss stage designer Peter Bissegger and is now on permanent display in the Sprengel Museum in Hanover.

== Early exhibitions ==
1957

- 03.08 – 20.10
  - Kunstmuseum St. Gallen
  - Malende Dichter – Dichtende Maler
- 24.09 – 27.09
  - Kleintheater Kramgasse 6, Bern
  - Hugo Ball (1886–1927): Manusckripte, Photographien, Bücher
- (Bern – Zürich: 4.11.1957)
- Club Bel Etage, Zürich

1961

- 08.07 -03.09
  - Kunsthalle, Bern
  - Otto Tschumi
- (Bern – Glarus)
- Kunsthaus, Glarus
- 02.09 – 24. 09
  - Städtische Galerie, Biel
  - Buri, Gürtler, Iseli, Luginbühl, Meister, Spescha, Schaffner
- 09.09 -15.10
  - Kunsthalle, Bern
  - Hans Aeschbacher: Skulpturen und Zeichnungen
- 21.10 – 26.11
  - Kunsthalle, Bern
  - Prähistorisch Felsbilder der Sahara: Expedition Henri Lhote im Gebiet Tassili-n-Ajjer

1962

- 17.02-11.03
  - Kunsthalle, Bern
  - Puppen-Marionetten-Schattenspiel: Asiatica und Experimente
- 17.03-23.04
  - Kunsthalle, Bern
  - Charles Lapicque
- (Bern-München-Grenoble-Le Havre)
- Städtische Galerie im Lenbachhaus, München/ Musée de Peinture et de Sculpture, Grenoble/Maison de la Culture, Le Havre
- 28.04-27.05
  - Kunsthalle, Bern
  - Lenz Klotz, Friedrich Kuhn, Bruno Müller, Matias Spescha
- 02.06-01.07
  - Kunsthalle, Bern
  - Walter Kurt Wiemken
- (Bern – St Gallen)
- Kunstmuseum St Gallen
- 07.07-02.09
  - Kunsthalle, Bern
  - Francis Picabia (1879–1953): Werke von 1909 bis 1924
- (Marseille-Bern)
  - 4 Amerikaner: Jasper Johns, Alfred Leslie, Robert Raushenberg,
  - Richard Stankiewicz
- (Stockholm-Amsterdam-Bern)
- Moderna Museet, Stockholm/Stedelijk Museum, Amsterdam
- 13.10-25.11
  - Städtische Galerie, Biel
  - Harry Kramer: Automobile Skulpturen-Marionetten-Filme
- 20.10-25.11
  - Kunsthalle, Bern
  - Kunst aus Tibet

1963

- 16.02-24.03
  - Kunsthalle, Bern
  - Auguste Herbin (1882–1960)
- (Bern-Amsterdam)
- Stedlijk Museum, Amsterdam
- 20.04-19.05
  - Städtische Galerie, Biel
  - Englebert van Anderlecht, Bram Bogart
- (Bern-Bruxelles)
- Palais des Beaux-Arts, Bruxelles
- 04.05-03.06
  - Kunsthalle, Bern
  - Alan Davie
- (Baden-Baden – Bern – Darmstadt – London – Amsterdam)
- Staatliche Kunsthalle, Baden-Baden
  - Piotr Kowalski
- 12.07-18.08
  - Kunsthalle, Bern
  - William Scott
- (Bern-Belfast)
- Ulster Museum, Belfast
  - Victor Pasmore
- 18.08-15.09
  - Städtische Galerie, Biel
  - Heinz-Peter Kohler, Gregory Masurovsky
- 24.08-15.09
  - Kunsthalle, Bern
  - Bildnerei der Geisteskranken-Art Brut- Insania pingens
- 21.09-27.10
  - Kunsthalle, Bern
  - Louis Moillet
- 02.11-01.12
  - Kunsthalle, Bern
  - Etienne-Martin
- (Bern-Amsterdam – Eindhoven)
- Stedelijk Museum, Amsterdam/Stedelijk van Abbemuseum, Eindhoven

== Major exhibitions ==
- Live In Your Head: When Attitudes Become Form (1969)
- Happening and Fluxus (1970)
- Documenta 5 (1972)
- Der Hang zum Gesamtkunstwerk (1983)

== Live in Your Head: When Attitudes Become Form ==
Live In Your Head: When Attitudes Become Form was a landmark show for Post-Minimalist American artists in 1969 at the Kunsthalle Bern.

Following the opening of the exhibition "12 Environments" in the summer of 1968, which featured the works of Andy Warhol, Martial Raysse, Soto, Jean Schnyder, Kowalski, and Christo, Harald Szeemann was asked to do a show of his own. Representatives of Philip Morris, American Tobacco Company, and Rudder and Finn, Public Relations Firm, visited Szemmann in Bern to recruit his expertise for a project. This project would entail substantial funding, with the additional benefit of collaborating with the Stedelijk (sponsored by the Holland American Line), and complete artistic freedom.

This was an entirely new opportunity for Szeemann therefore he accepted the sponsored proposal. The project was initially conceived whenever Szeemann, with the Director of the Stedelijk named de Wilde, traveled through Switzerland and Holland to select the works of younger artists for national shows. When visiting the studio of a Dutch painter, Reinier Lucassen, Szeemann was immediately impressed with the work of the painter's assistant Jan Dibbets. Jan greeted Szeemann from behind two tables; one of which had neon light coming out of the surface and the other one was covered in grass which he watered. Szeemann was thereafter inspired to focus the upcoming exhibition on behaviors and gestures.

Shortly after the conception the show developed quickly. A published diary of Attitudes details trips, studio visits, and installation. The show became a dialog of how works could either assume material form or remain immaterial, documenting an important revelatory concept in the history of art. This show was a moment of intensity and freedom in which a work could be produced or imagined, according to Lawrence Weiner. 69 Artists, Europeans and Americans controlled the Kunsthalle. For example, Robert Barry irradiated the roof; Richard Long did a walk in the mountains; Mario Merz made among his first igloos; Michael Heizer "opened" the sidewalk; Walter de Maria produced his telephone piece; Richard Serra showed lead sculptures, the belt piece, and splash piece; Weiner took a square meter out of the wall; Beuys made a grease sculpture. The Kunsthalle Bern became a laboratory of exhibiting "organized chaos".

Following When Attitudes Become Form and the following exhibition Friends and their Friends a scandal was provoked in Bern. Szeemann believed to be showing artwork contrary to the opinions of critics and the public. The city government and parliament eventually became involved in the issue. It was decided that Szeemann's directorship was "destructive to humankind". As well the exhibition committee, largely composed of local artists, decided they would dictate the programming and rejected shows proposed by Szeemann they had previously agreed to, including the solo show of Beuys. Thereafter Szeemann, tired of this open war, decided to resign and become a freelance curator and operated under his newly founded Agency for Spiritual Guest Work.

== 1997 Lyon Biennial L'autre (the Other) ==
Originating in 1991, the city of Lyon's Musee d'art Contemporain co-directors, Thierry Raspail and Thierry Prat, has hosted a biennial art exhibition, which generally has garnered little attention to international audiences. Each biennial has a specific theme and guest curator who determines the components of the exhibition. The choice for the Fourth Biennial, in 1997, was Harald Szeemann. The co-directors chosen theme for the exhibition was derived from the post-structuralist term L'autre, the other. L'autre was held at L'Halle Tony Garnier in the outskirts of Lyon. The structure from the 1920s is an example of extraordinary engineering of the era. The large scale of the space made it suitable for showing large-scale works such as by Richard Serra or Serge Spitzer, which would otherwise be excluded from such exhibitions in conventional spaces.

Szeemann's choices were eclectic but consistently focused on the subject of contemporary artists' personal mythologies. Large-scale sculptures by artists as: Bruce Nauman, Louise Bourgeois, Joseph Beuys, Richard Serra, Chris Burden, Jessica Stockholder, Hanne Darboven, and Ute Schroder were viewed in relation to video installations by: Gary Hill, Mariko Mori, Zhang Peili, Paul McCarthy, and Igor and Svetlana Kopystiansky. There were "physical/ ephemeral" pieces by younger artists, such as Jason Rhoades and Richard Jackson, and the famous large-scale black rats by Katharina Fritsch, which were shown earlier at the Dia Center for the Arts in New York.

Szeemann included a historical section with bronze cast self-portraits of the eighteenth-century artist Franz Xaver Messerschmidt, an ancestral figure to contemporary performance art. Szeemann mounted the bronze heads in a circular arrangement, thereby asserting their relationship to closely placed works by the Vienna Actionists of the 1960s. Surrounding the Messerschmidts were photographs, drawings, and relics by artists as Rudolf Schwarzkogler, Hermann Nitsch, Otto Muhl, Günther Brus, and Arnulf Rainer. Another portion of the "historical" section was an entry in the exhibition catalog by the French art historian and curator Jean Clair.

An apparent theme intended by Szeemann in L'Autre was to position artists at the end of modernism within the context of a "self-historifying mythos". The diversity of works chosen for the Fourth Biennial reflected the constant edge of what was modernism, also what is perceived at its boundaries.

== Visual arts director of 1999 and 2001 Venice Biennale ==
At the time of Szeemann's appointment the Venice Biennale was no longer a state-run enterprise but has become a foundation. The representation of 15 has been reduced to five people; one representing the city, another the region, another the province, another the National Government, and lastly an unaffiliated third party. Cai Guo-Qiang was awrded the Leone d'Oro.

Paolo Baratta named directors for the different sections of film, architecture, theater, music, dance, and also visual arts, Szeemann's area of appointment. Szeemann was appointed the Visual Arts Director, succeeding his predecessor Jean Clair, with only five months to prepare for the 1999 Venice Biennale but with the expectation that he would also direct the following show in 2001. A contingency of this appointment was that he would be able to bring his own people with him as well as have more flexibility with the structure of the Biennale. In addition to the regular crew he uses for installation he brought with him Agnes Kohlmeyer to help with the show and Cecilia Liveriero to work on the catalog. Szeemann was responsible for organizing the international exhibition in the Giardini and Arsenale, to give recommendations for the exhibitions a latere, for contributions outside the pavilions and in the city, to keep contact with the commissioners of the national pavilions, and the like.

With the last two Biennales as example, under the directorships of Jean Clair and Germano Celant, Szeemann determined that the international exhibition and national pavilions should be dedicated to young artists and he informed this to all participating countries. As a result of many countries' selection systems this came as late news, but for a few others who were more unencumbered to react this was not problematic. Szeemann decided that the international exhibition and Aperto, created by Szeemann in 1980, would be combined and artists would no longer be divided by age. As well there would be an emphasis on the representation of female artists and their contributions to contest their past roles, with such artists as Rosemarie Trockel from Germany and Ann Hamilton from the USA. Changing the inner structure of the Biennale, breaking up the divisions, and expanding the space were among Szeemann's contributions.

Szeemann was largely concerned with traditional structure of the Biennale and believed the treatment of artists during installation required improvement. Another result of Szeemann's acceptance was fair representation for Italian artists. The Italian Pavilion, a sequence of rooms displaying Italian art, was kept in a ghetto and inadequate in comparison to other national pavilions. Another concern was from a resulting breakup of the Soviet Union and the history of conflict in Yugoslavia had created many issues, Macedonia renounced its participation and Yugoslavia was an unknown, in addition to the growing number of countries which demanded a presence in the Biennale.

== Other work ==
Szeemann curated the 1st International Biennial of Contemporary Art of Seville (BIACS 1) in 2004, titled "The Joy of My Dreams," including artists Hüseyin Bahri Alptekin, Miroslav Tichý, Henry Vincent (artist), and Pilar Albarracín, hosted at the Reales Atarazanas.

Juries for art awards

2000: Contemporary Chinese Art Award

2002: The Walters Prize

2002: The Vincent Award

Memberships and boards

1961-2005: Collège de 'Pataphysique' (artist group)

1967-?: Founding member, International Association of Curators of Contemporary Art (IKT)

1996: Szeemann played a key role in shaping the architecture faculty at the Università della Svizzera italiana, the first university in Italian Switzerland, for the first six years after its founding.

1997-2005: Department of Visual Arts, Akademie der Künste, Berlin, Germany

== Awards received ==
1998: Award for Curatorial Excellence, Center for Curatorial Studies, Bard College

2000: Max Beckmann Prize

2005: Das Glas der Vernunft

2005: Awarded a "Special Gold Lion" at the Biennale in Venice

== Archive and library ==
Throughout Szeemann's life he had collected all documentation related to his work and life. The end result was his personal archive, consisting of books about art, artists, art theory, exhibitions, curation, and the like. It also included anything acting as correspondence: letters and messages which were traded with artists, curators, sponsors, and any other relevant stakeholder. H This archive also encompassed articles akin to formal records, documentation, or notation which had been collected during Szeemann's various endeavors. Anything of any bearing with his various professional projects and curatorial plans had been collected and documented and curated.

Harald Szeemann died in 2005, leaving behind his vast collection to an unknown beneficiary, until, in June 2011, the Getty Research Institute publicized purchase of The Harald Szeemann Archive and Library, probably one of the most important research collections for Western and Modern and Contemporary Art. Szeemann had devoted himself to his archive and library and resultingly it contains thousands of documents related to his practice as an art historian, art critic and curator which continue to be studied today. At the time, it was the largest acquisition in the Getty Research Institute's history.

This collection encompasses of over 1,000 boxes of research. It consists of:

- Correspondence with individual artists, such as those frequently exchanged such as: Bruce Nauman, Richard Serra, Cy Twombly, and Christo and Jeanne-Claude.
- The library portion consists of approximately 28,000 volumes.
- The archive also includes about 36,000 photographs and drawings as well as other materials Szeemann assembled through organizing and exhibition over 200 exhibitions.

The collection is open to researchers and a published finding aid is available online: http://hdl.handle.net/10020/cifa2011m30

== Notability ==
Szeemann invented the modern-day Großausstellung ("great exhibition"), in which the artworks are tied to a central concept and are assembled into new and often surprising interrelationships. His over 200 exhibitions were distinguished by a great abundance of material and a broad range of themes. Important reference points were subversiveness, alternative lifestyles (for example Monte Verità), and the Gesamtkunstwerk ("total artwork", Wagner's concept of a work which spans all the arts, to which his own exhibitions were also indebted).

== Literature ==
- Hans-Joachim Muller, Harald Szeeman: Exhibition Maker, Hatje Cantz, 2006, ISBN 978-3-7757-1705-2
- Tobia Bezzola, Roman Kurzmeyer, Harald Szeemann: With, by, through, because, towards, despite, Springer Architecture, Vienna, 2007, ISBN 978-3-211836-32-3
- Florence Derieux, Harald Szeemann: Individual Methodology, JRP-Ringier, Zurich, 2008, ISBN 978-3-905829-09-9
- Una Szeemann, Bohdan Stehlik, Michele Robecchi, Elsa Himmer, Pretenzione Intenzione: Objects of Beauty and Bewilderment from the Archive of Harald Szeemann, Editions Patrick Frey, Zurich, 2026, ISBN 978-3-907236-83-3

== Publications ==
- Klaus Albrecht and Harald Szeemann, Egon Schiele and His Contemporaries: Austrian Painting and Drawing from 1900 to 1930 from the Leopold Collection, Vienna, Vienna, Munich: Prestel, 1989
- Elsa Longhauser and Harald Szeemann, eds., Self-Taught Artists of the Twentieth Century: An American Anthology (Chronicle Books 1998). ISBN 978-0-8118-2099-8
