= Anthony Ramos (artist) =

American artist

Anthony Ramos is an American video artist, performance artist and painter. He was born in 1944 in Providence, Rhode Island, and lives in the South of France.

== Education, awards and early career ==
Before he received an M.F.A. from the California Institute of the Arts he had studied painting at Southern Illinois University. He was a graduate assistant to Allan Kaprow. A conscientious objector, Ramos was jailed for 18 months for draft evasion.

Early in his career he received a National Endowment for the Arts Visual Arts Fellowship, a Rockefeller Foundation Fellowship, and an Aspen Fellowship from the Aspen Institute. During the 1970s and 1980s, Ramos traveled widely in Europe, Africa, China and the Middle East. He documented the end of Portugal's colonial rule in Cape Verde and in Guinea-Bissau. He was in Teheran during the 1980 Iran hostage crisis.

== Exhibitions and screenings ==
Ramos' pioneering video works have been shown at the

- Pasadena Art Museum, California (1973)
- Musée d'Art Moderne de la Ville de Paris (1974)
- Whitney Museum of American Art (1975)
- The Museum of Modern Art, New York (1992)
- Light Industry, New York (2010)
- Circa 1971: Early Video & Film from the EAI Archive at Dia: Beacon (2011–2012)
- The Embodied Vision: Performance for the Camera at the Museu Nacional de Arte Contemporânea do Chiado in Lisbon (2014)
- Anthony Ramos: Vidéo et après at the Centre Pompidou in Paris (2014)
- Tell It Like It Is: Black Independents in New York, 1968–1986 at the Film Society of Lincoln Center, New York (2015)

== Teaching and painting ==
Anthony Ramos taught at Rhode Island School of Design, New York University, and the University of California at San Diego, among others. Since the late 1980s he has primarily worked in painting. Several international venues exhibited his work, among them the American Jazz Museum and Bruce R. Watkins Cultural Center, Kansas City; Biennale de Dakar, Senegal.
