= Kunsthalle Bern =

Art Gallery in Bern, Switzerland

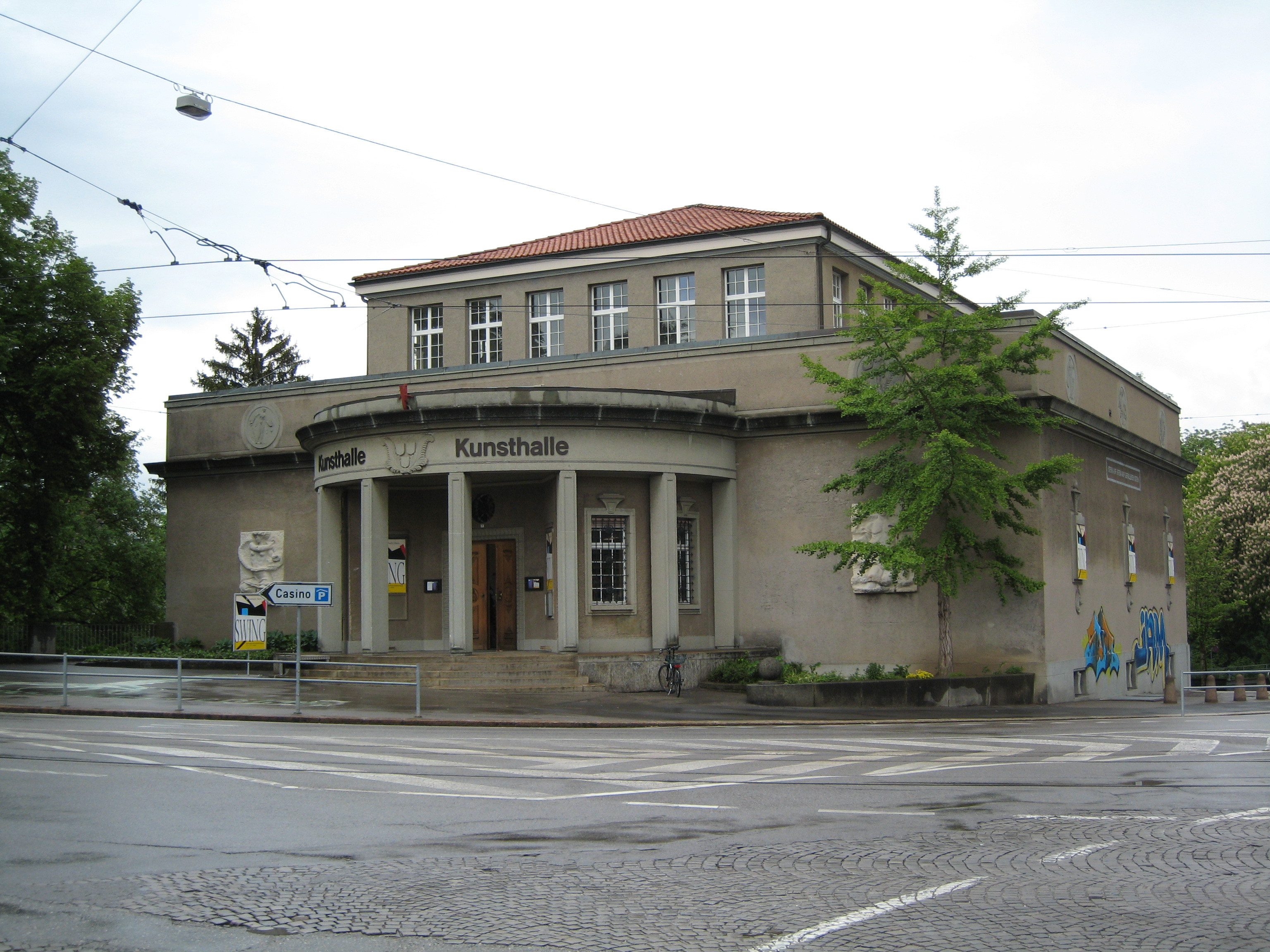
- Established: 1918
- Location: Helvetiaplatz, Bern, Switzerland
- Coordinates: 46.9443°N 7.4494°E
- Type: Kunsthalle
- Director: iLiana Fokianaki
- Public transit access: Helvetiaplatz
- Website: http://www.kunsthalle-bern.ch

The Kunsthalle Bern is a Kunsthalle (art exposition hall) on the Helvetiaplatz in Bern, Switzerland.

Built in 1917–1918 by the Kunsthalle Bern Association, the gallery officially opened on October 5, 1918. Since then it has played a significant role in the presentation of modern and contemporary art in Switzerland. It has hosted exhibitions by both Swiss and international artists affiliated with the avant-garde movement. In 1933, Ernst Ludwig Kirchner organized a major retrospective of his work at the Kunsthalle, curating his own exhibition, which was unusual at the time.

The Kunsthalle gained international acclaim with solo exhibitions by artists such as On Kawara, Paul Klee, Christo, Alberto Giacometti, Henry Moore, Jasper Johns, Sol LeWitt, Gregor Schneider, Eva Aeppli, Bruce Nauman, Lawrence Weiner, Bridget Riley and Daniel Buren, Hans Haacke and has hosted seminal group exhibitions such as Harald Szeemann's Live In Your Head: When Attitudes Become Form (1969). Szeeman's work for the institution was re-visited in recent years by various exhibitions that took place in Fondazione Prada and Kunsthalle Bern, among other places, such as Impossible Encounters, according to the Financial Times.

On the occasion of its 50th anniversary the Kunsthalle Bern became the first building ever to be wrapped entirely by Christo and Jeanne-Claude in July 1968.

During the mid-20th century, the institution gained increased international attention under directors such as Harald Szeemann. Under his direction, the Kunsthalle staged influential exhibitions, including Live in Your Head: When Attitudes Become Form (1969), which brought together post-minimalist, Arte Povera and process-based practices and contributed to changes in exhibition-making and curatorial approaches. In 1968, the Kunsthalle Bern became the first building to be wrapped by Christo and Jeanne-Claude.

In the decades that followed, the Kunsthalle Bern continued to present exhibitions introducing new artistic positions and thematic approaches to contemporary art. It hosted early major institutional solo exhibitions by artists such as Jasper Johns and Luc Tuymans, Matthew Barney, Marcel Broodthaers, Daniel Buren, Dan Graham, Jef Geys, Pedro Cabrita Reis, Allan Kaprow, Marine Hugonnier, Tobias Kaspar, Moshekwa Langa, and organised group exhibitions addressing current debates in contemporary practice. Institutional developments included the systematic documentation of its exhibition history dating back to 1918. In 2018, the Kunsthalle marked its centenary with exhibitions and projects reflecting on its institutional history and its role in the development of exhibition practices, including retrospectives related to the period of Harald Szeemann's directorship. Tobias Kaspar's anonymously held solo exhibition and career survey Independence was one of the most challenging and both publicly and critically successful exhibitions having been covered by almost all international art magazines such as Artforum, Texte zur Kunst, Frieze but also local newspaper and radio stations.

Most recently, the Kunsthalle Bern has continued to present contemporary exhibitions engaging with international artistic practices. These include a major solo exhibition by Melvin Edwards in 2025, which formed part of the institution's ongoing programme of introducing artists to Swiss audiences and addressing global dialogues in contemporary art.

Its current director is Greek curator and theorist iLiana Fokianaki .

== Directors ==
- 1918 – 1930: Robert Kieser
- 1931 – 1946: Max Huggler
- 1946 – 1955: Arnold Rüdlinger
- 1955 – 1961: Franz Meyer
- 1961 – 1969: Harald Szeemann
- 1970 – 1974: Carlo Huber
- 1974 – 1982: Johannes Gachnang
- 1982 – 1985: Jean-Hubert Martin
- 1985 – 1997: Ulrich Loock
- 1997 – 2005: Bernhard Fibicher
- 2005 – 2011: Philippe Pirotte
- 2012 – 2014: Fabrice Stroun
- 2015 – 2022: Valérie Knoll
- 2022 - 2024: Kabelo Malatsie
- 2024 : iLiana Fokianaki

== Literature ==
- Jean-Christophe Ammann / Harald Szeemann, Von Hodler zur Antiform. Geschichte der Kunsthalle Bern, Bern 1970.
- Hans Rudolf Reust, Aus dem Musée éclaté an den Ort des Werks, Kunsthalle Bern 1969-1993, Bern 1993, ISBN 3-85780-088-7
- Florian Dombois, Valérie Knoll, eds, im Tun: Eine Geschichte der Künstler*innen 2018–1993. Scheidegger & Spiess, Zurich 2018, ISBN 978-3-85881-594-1
- Peter Schneemann, Localizing the Contemporary – The Kunsthalle Bern as a Model, JRP Ringier Editions, 2018 ISBN 978-3037645284

== See also ==
- List of museums in Bern
- List of museums in Switzerland
