= La Colonie (Art Space) =

Cultural venue in Paris, France

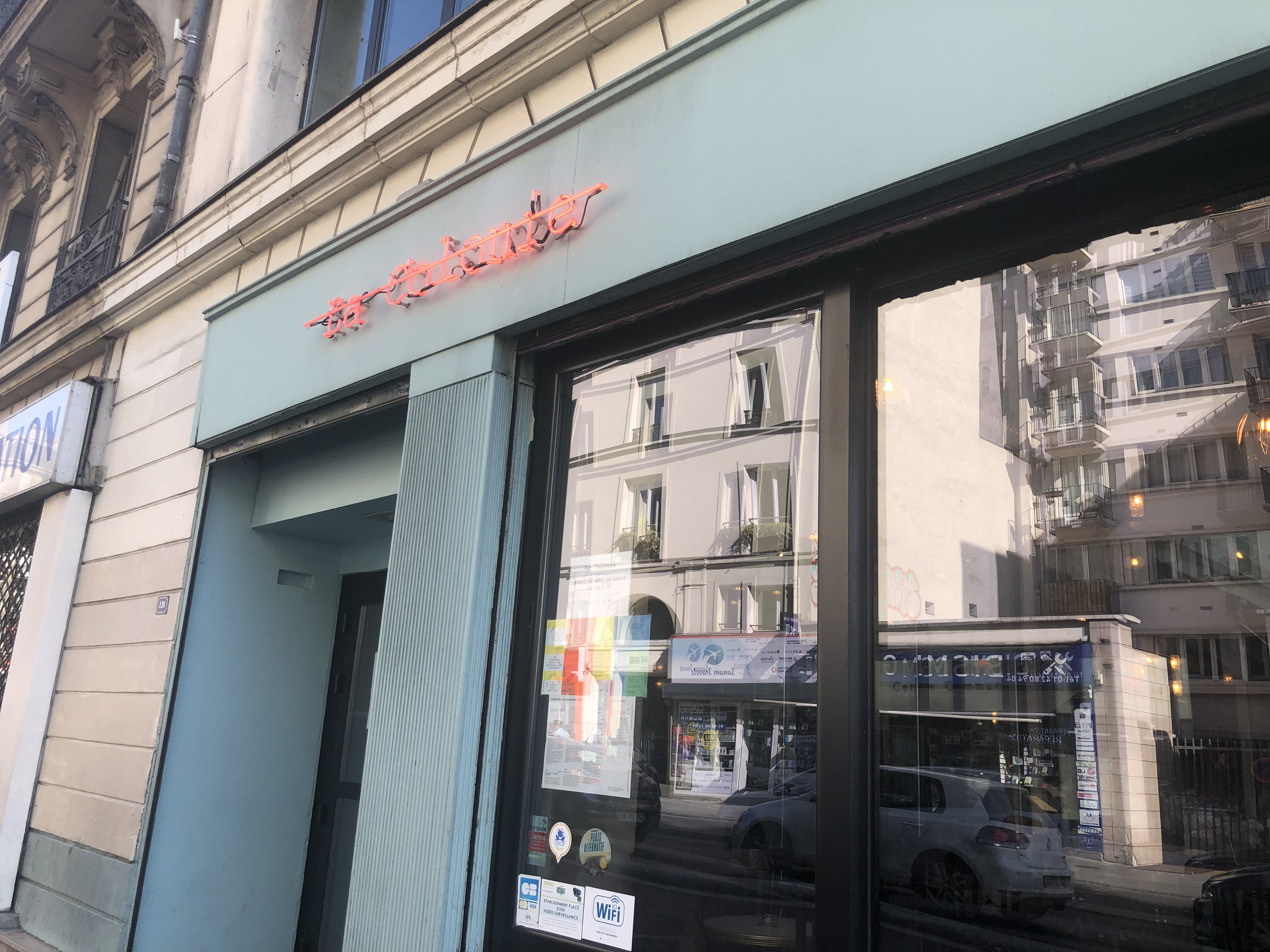
- Location: Paris, France
- Type: Art center
- Event: Contemporary art

Construction
- Opened: October 2016
- Closed: 2020

Website
- lacolonie.paris

La Colonie was an independent cultural venue located in a former textile factory in the 10th arrondissement of Paris, near the Gare du Nord train station. It was founded by French artist Kader Attia and restaurateur Zico Selloum in 2016. It closed in March 2020 as a result of the COVID-19 pandemic.

== History ==
La Colonie opened on 17 October 2016, to commemorate the 55th anniversary of the Paris Massacre of 1961, in which hundreds of National Liberation Front Algerians demonstrating for Algerian independence were killed by the French National Police.

In March 2020, La Colonie closed in response to the COVID-19 pandemic. Because La Colonie was dependent on revenue generated by its ground floor bar and café, it did not recover financially from the closure and has remained closed. Founder Kader Attia has indicated that the venue will persist but in a smaller, more affordable space in the Paris suburbs.

== Programming ==
La Colonie was a multi-use space and functioned as a café and agora, in addition to a forum for workshops, lectures, readings, screenings, and art exhibitions with a focus on marginalized artists, thinkers, and activists whose work addressed issues of colonialism, racism, and cultural appropriation.

Notable exhibitions included:

- Opaque to herself: Poland and postcolonialism, November 2019 – 15 January 2020, curated by Joanna Warsza
- The Trials of Justice, 29 May – 30 June 2019, curated by iLiana Fokianaki
- Noria: Investigative grounds on violence and the state, 18 May 2019
- Return of Fordlandia, an open-air archive, 13–25 November 2018
- Discreet Violence: Discreet Violence: Architecture and the French War in Algeria, 19 June – 14 July 2018, curated by Samia Henni
- CARACAS RESET, 15–17 May 2018
