= Kader Attia =

French artist

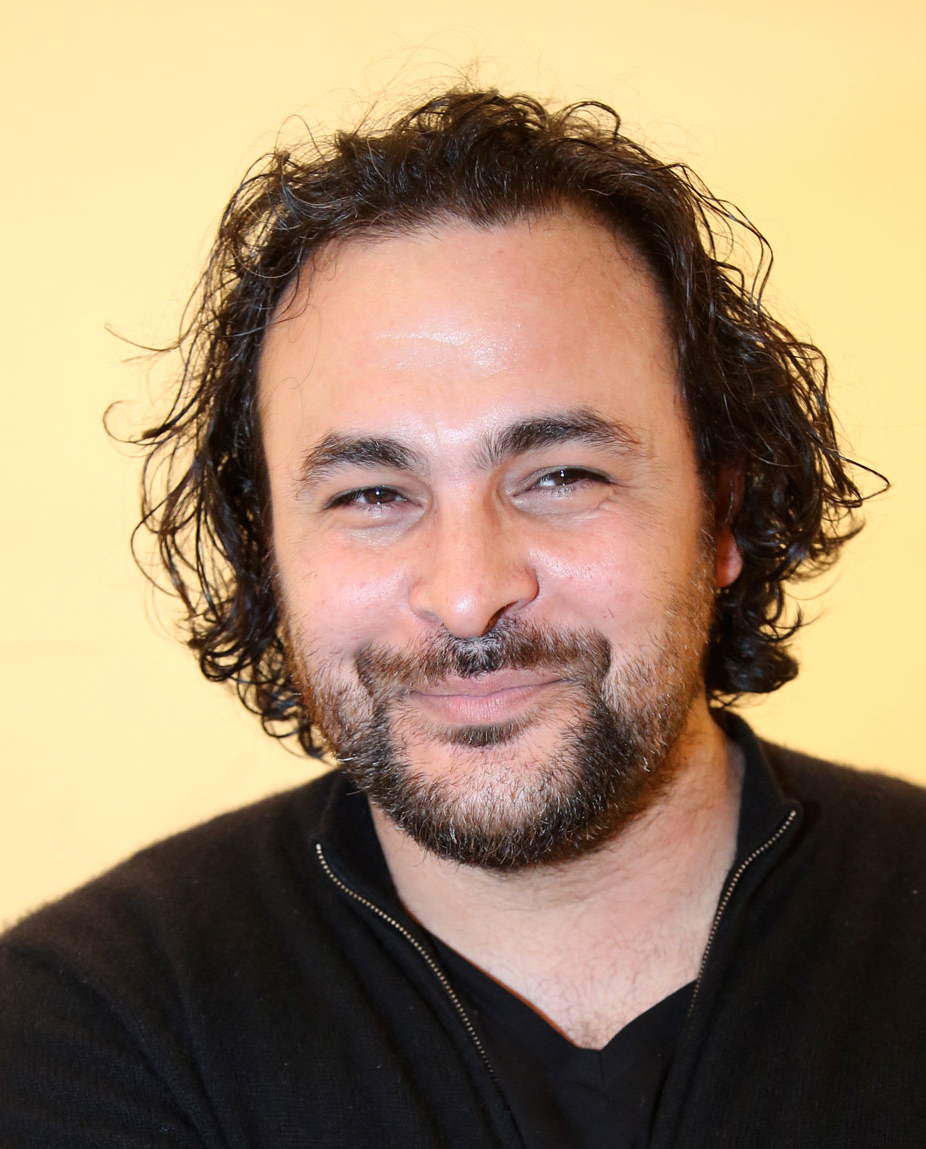
- Attia in 2015
- Born: 30 December 1970 (age 55); Dugny, France
- Known for: Visual art

Kader Attia (born 30 December 1970) is an Algerian-French artist. (Note: "This multicultural background is something that belongs to my work and to my history. I feel myself as both French and Algerian. I’m definitely in between.")

== Early life ==
Attia was born in Dugny, France to Algerian parents and was raised in Paris and Algeria. He studied at the l'école Duperré de Paris, l'école des arts appliqués La Massana de Barcelone and graduated from the Ecole nationale superieure des arts decoratifs Paris, in 1998.

== Work ==
Attia's work often examines social injustice, marginalized communities and postcolonialism. His work has involved the concept of repair in relation to these concepts.

In 2016, Attia founded La Colonie, a gallery near Paris' Gare du Nord train station. In March 2020, La Colonie closed permanently due to the coronavirus pandemic. In March 2021, Attia was announced as the curator for the 12th Berlin Biennale. He is the first artist to curate the biennale since New-York based collective DIS, who presented the 9th edition in 2016. In November 2021, he had an exhibition entitled "On Silence" at the Mathaf: Arab Museum of Modern Art in Doha.

== Collections ==
Attia's work is included in the permanent collections of:

- Museum of Modern Art, New York,
- Sharjah Art Foundation,
- Tate Museum,
- Centre Georges Pompidou, Paris,
- Institute of Contemporary Art, Boston,
- Guggenheim Museum in New York.
- Arter, İstanbul.

== Awards ==
- In 2016, Attia won France's Prix Marcel Duchamp. In 2018, he was awarded the Joan Miró Prize.
- In 2019, Attia was a member of the jury that selected Arthur Jafa as winner of the Prince Pierre Foundation's International Contemporary Art Prize. In 2026, he served on the jury of the Marcel Duchamp Prize.

== Partial bibliography ==
- The Repair from Occident to Extra-Occidental Cultures. The Green Box Kunstedition. 2013. ISBN 9783941644533
- The White West: Fascism, Unreason, and the Paradox of Modernity. MIT Press. 2024. ISBN 9783956795336, editor.
