= Curator =

Content specialist charged with managing an institution's collections

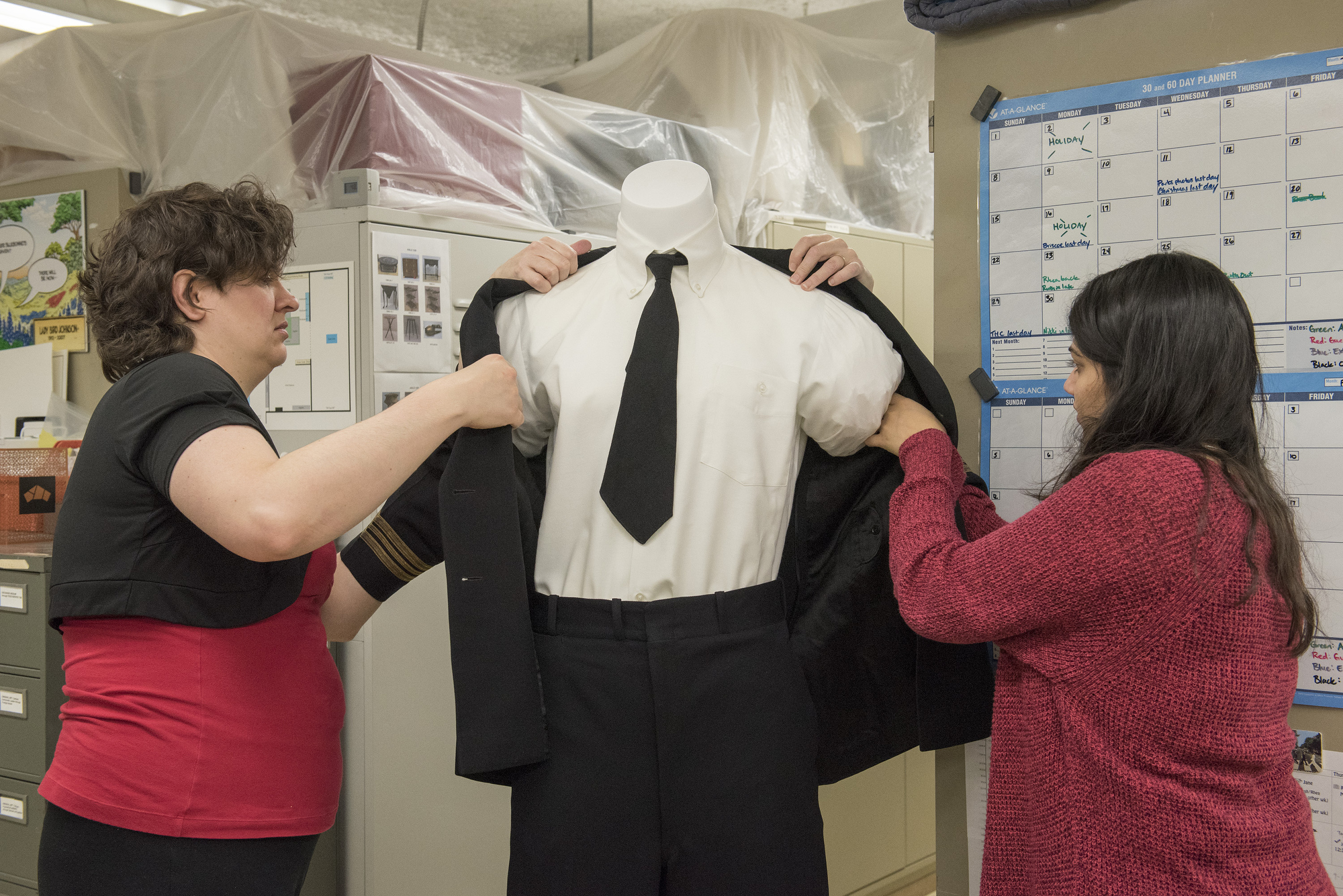
Curator and exhibit designer dress a mannequin for an exhibit.

A curator (from Latin cura 'to take care') is a manager or overseer. When working with cultural organizations, a curator is typically a "collections curator" or an "exhibitions curator", and has multifaceted tasks dependent on the particular institution and its mission. The term "curator" may designate the head of any given division, not limited to museums. Curator roles include "community curators", "literary curators", "digital curators", and "biocurators".

== Collections curator ==
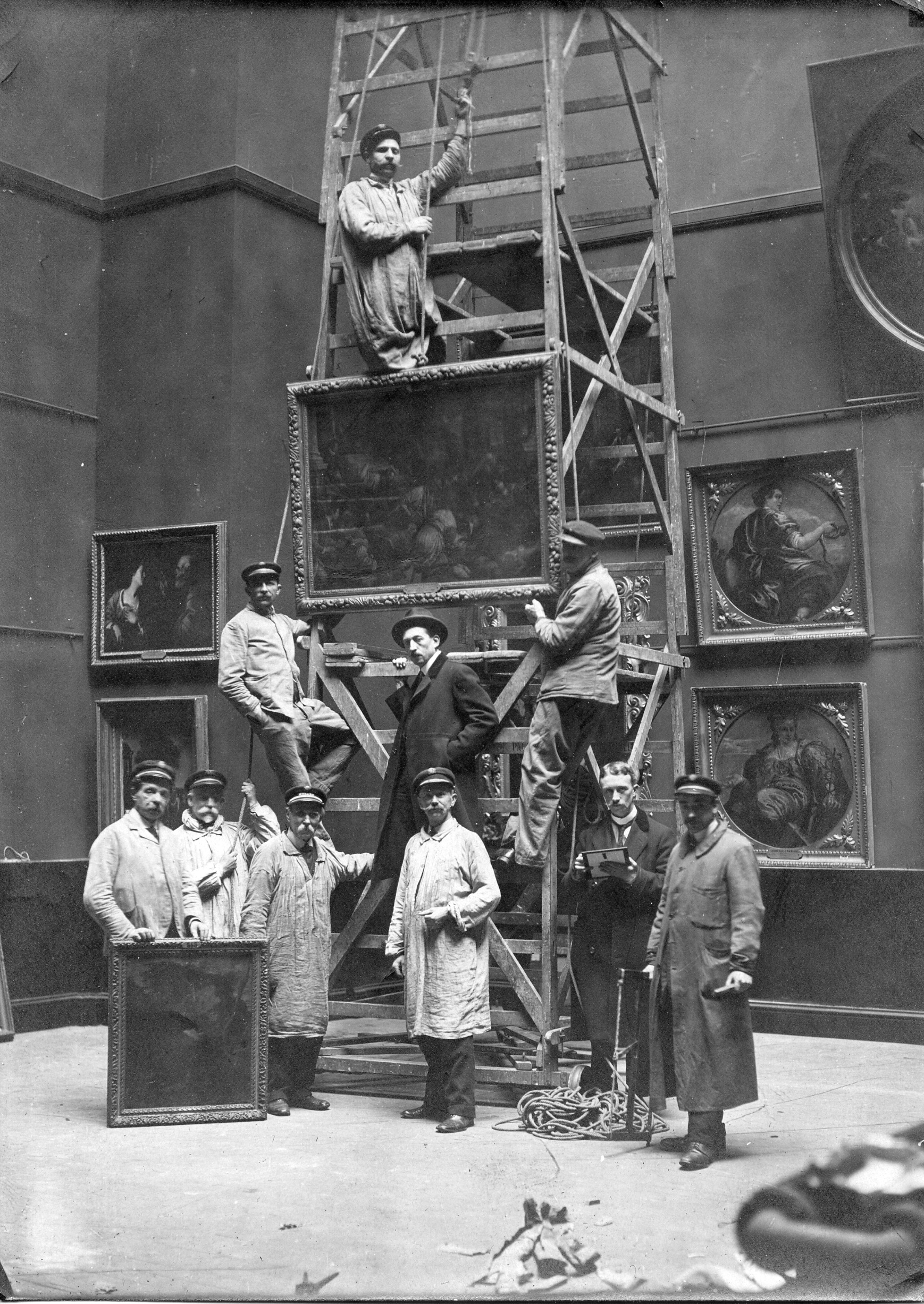
Emile Theodore (center), museum curator of the Palais des Beaux-Arts de Lille from 1912 to 1937, shown here during reconstruction of the gallery dedicated to Spanish and Italian paintings, c. 1920.

A "collections curator", a "museum curator", or a "keeper" of a cultural heritage institution (e.g., gallery, museum, library, or archive) is a content specialist charged with an institution's collections and involved with the interpretation of heritage material including historical artifacts. A collections curator's concern necessarily involves tangible objects of some sort—artwork, collectibles, historic items, or scientific collections.

In smaller organizations, a curator may have sole responsibility for acquisitions and even for collections care. A curator makes decisions regarding what objects to select, oversees their potential and documentation, conducts research based on the collection and its history, provides proper packaging of object for transportation, and shares research with the public and community through exhibitions and publications. In very small, volunteer-based museums, such as those of local historical societies, a curator may be the only paid staff-member.

In larger institutions, the curator's primary function is that of a subject specialist, with the expectation that he or she will conduct original research on objects and guide the organization in its collecting. Such institutions can have multiple curators, each assigned to a specific collecting area (e.g., curator of ancient art, curator of prints and drawings, etc.) and often operating under the direction of a head curator. In such organizations, the physical care of the collection may be overseen by museum collections-managers or by museum conservators, with documentation and administrative matters (such as personnel, insurance, and loans) handled by a museum registrar.

In France, the term "collections curator" is translated as conservateur. There are two kinds of conservateurs: heritage curators (conservateurs du patrimoine) with five specialities (archeology, archives, museums, historical monuments, natural science museums), and librarian curators (conservateurs des bibliothèques). These curators are selected by competitive examination and attend the INP (Institut National du Patrimoine). The "conservateurs du patrimoine" are civil servants or work in the public service; the use of the title by private workers is not possible.

In the United Kingdom, the term "curator" also applies to government employees who monitor the quality of contract archaeological work under Planning Policy Guidance 16: Archaeology and Planning (PPG 16) and manage the cultural resource of a region. In a museum setting, a curator in the United Kingdom may also be called a "keeper".

== Exhibitions curator ==
An "exhibitions curator" is a person in charge of conceiving and organising exhibitions.

The title "curator" identifies someone who selects and often interprets works for an exhibit. In addition to selecting works, the curator is often responsible for writing labels, catalog essays, and other content supporting exhibitions. Such curators may be permanent staff members, "guest curators" from an affiliated organization or university, or "freelance curators" working on a consultancy basis.

In France, the term "exhibitions curator" is translated as commissaire d'exposition or curateur.

The late-20th century saw an explosion of artists organizing exhibitions. The artist-curator has a long tradition of influence, notably featuring Sir Joshua Reynolds (1723–1792), inaugural president of the Royal Academy of Arts, London, founded in 1768.

== Education and training ==
Curators hold a high academic degree in their subject, typically a Doctor of Philosophy or a master's degree in subjects such as history, art, history of art, archaeology, anthropology, or classics. Curators are also expected to have contributed to their academic field, for example, by delivering public talks, publishing articles, or presenting at specialist academic conferences. It is important that curators have knowledge of the current collecting market for their area of expertise, and are aware of current ethical practices and laws that may impact their organisation's collecting. The increased complexity of many museums and cultural organisations has prompted the emergence of professional programs in fields such as public history, public humanities, museum studies, arts management, and curating/curatorial practice.

== Biocuration ==
A biocurator is a professional scientist who curates, collects, annotates, and validates information that is disseminated by biological databases and model organism databases.

== Community curation ==
Education and outreach play an important role in some institutions. It has led to the emergence of titles such as "Curator of Education" and "Curator of Public Practice".

Community curation— also known as "co-curation", "public curation" or "inclusive curation"—is a movement in museums, public humanities organizations, and within the biocuration field to involve community members in various curatorial processes, including exhibit development and programming.

Community members involved in community curation are likely not trained as museum professionals, but have vested interests in the outcomes of curatorial projects. Community curation is a response to the 19th century "information transmission" model of learning, in which museums are sources of expert knowledge and visitors are the recipients of that expertise. Community curation seeks not to abandon expertise, but to broaden definitions of expertise to "include broader domains of experience" that visitors bring to museums.

Community curation practices are varied. Organizations have conducted community outreach at the beginning of exhibition projects, and convenes community advisory committees at various stages in the curatorial process. or have accepted exhibit proposals from community members and trained them in curatorial skills to co-create exhibits. Such efforts to allow communities to participate in curation can require "more not less expertise from museum staff".

== Literary curation ==
The term "literary curator" has been used to describe persons who work in the field of poetry, such as former 92nd Street Y director Karl Kirchwey.

== Technology curators ==
Technology curators are people who are able to disentangle the science and logic of a particular technology and apply it to real-world situations and society, whether it is for social change, commercial advantage, or other purposes. The first U.K. Wired Conference had a test lab, where an independent curator selected technology that showcased radical technology advancements and their impact on society, such as the ability to design and "print" physical objects using 3D printers (such as a fully working violin) or the ability to model and represent accurate interactive medical and molecular models in stereoscopic 3D.

As US museums have become increasingly more digitized, curators find themselves constructing narratives in both the material and digital worlds. Historian Elaine Gurian has called for museums in which "visitors could comfortably search for answers to their own questions regardless of the importance placed on such questions by others". This would change the role of curator from teacher to "facilitator and assistor". In this sense, the role of curator in the United States is precarious, as digital and interactive exhibits often allow members of the public to become their own curators, and to choose their own information. Citizens are then able to educate themselves on the specific subject they are interested in, rather than spending time listening to information they have no desire to learn.

== Other definitions ==
In Scotland, the term "curator" is also used to mean the guardian of a child, known as curator ad litem.

In Australia and New Zealand, the term also applies to a person who prepares a sports ground for use (especially a cricket ground). This job is equivalent to that of groundsman in some other cricketing nations.

Obsolete terms referring to a female curator are "curatrix" and "curatress".

== See also ==
- Curatorial platform
- Exhibit design
