= Peter Schweri =

Swiss artist, painter, illustrator, photographer and music composer

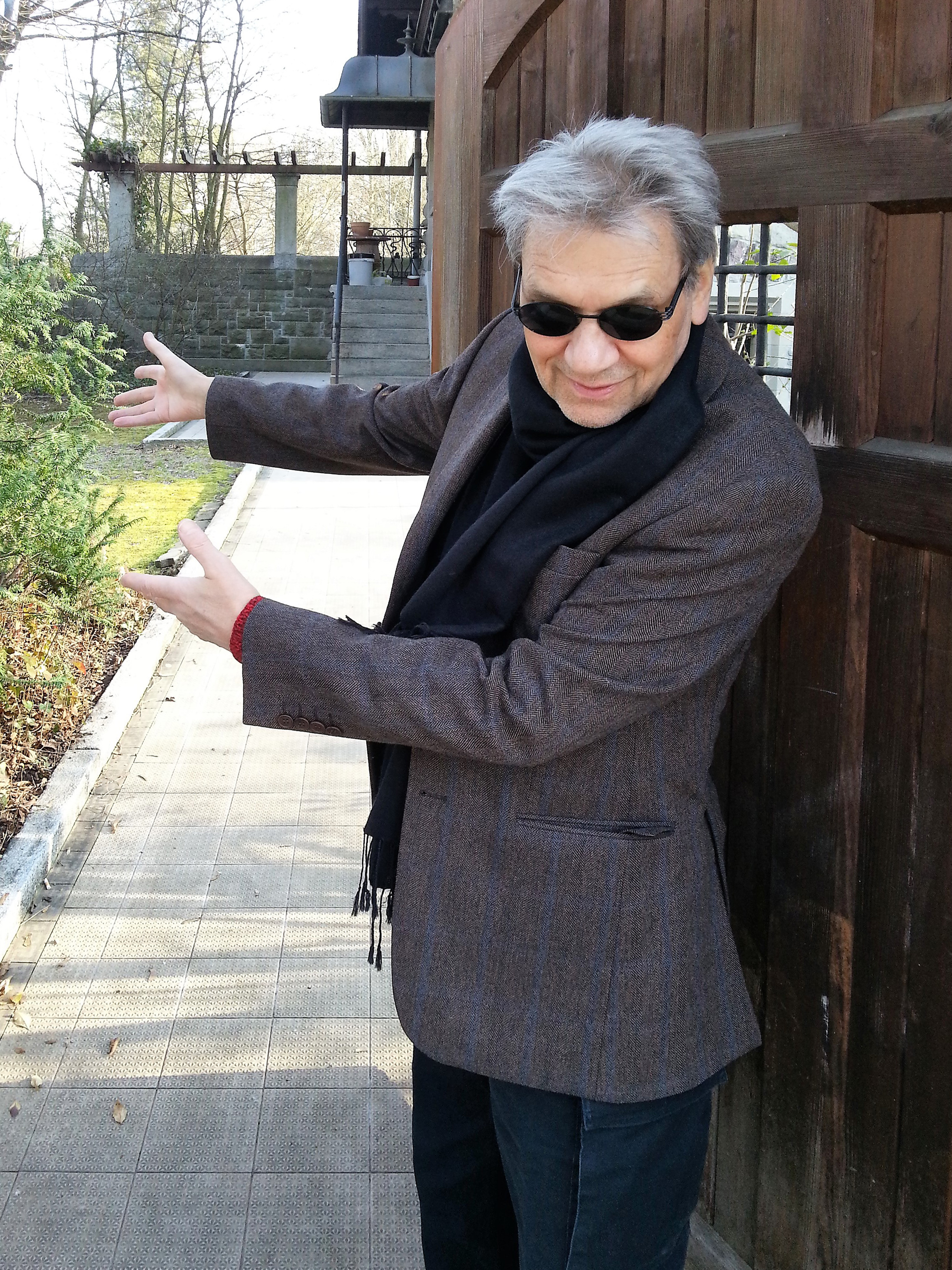
- Peter Schweri in the entrance to his apartment at Villa Egli, Zürich (c. 2014)
- Born: 20 June 1939; Dietikon, Switzerland
- Died: 25 November 2016 (aged 77); Zürich, Switzerland
- Occupations: Artist, painter, illustrator, photographer
- Known for: "Zürich constructivism", "ArtCode86»

Peter Schweri (20 June 1939, Dietikon – 25 November 2016) was a Swiss artist, painter, illustrator, photographer, and, from 2008 onward, a music composer. He was a representative of "Zürich Constructivism."

== Life and work ==
Peter Schweri was born on 20 June 1939 in Dietikon. He began his professional career as an apprentice draftsman in structural engineering from 1956 to 1959 at the Zürich College of Applied Sciences, Gewerbeschule Zürich. From 1959 to 1960, he studied at the Kunstgewerbeschule Zürich, where Hansjörg Mattmüller served as his professor, mentor, and later, friend.

From 1960 to 1961, Schweri studied graphic arts under Josef Müller-Brockmann. Recognizing Schweri's drawing and artistic talent, Paul Gredinger, a co-owner of the advertising agency GGK (Gerstner & Kutter), hired him in 1962 to create artwork that would enhance GGK's cultural image.

In the 1960s, Schweri was deeply involved in photography and film. He produced films for various clients in studios located in Milan, Zürich, and Paris. During this period, he also worked as an interior designer and created an art film—a precursor to today's music videos—for a disco in Milan. Additionally, he developed a light show (a slide show combined with film footage), which was displayed simultaneously on three screens at the nightclub Black Out in Zürich-Kloten.

From 1968 to 1976, Schweri lived and worked in the village of Carona, located in the Ticino region of Switzerland. During this time, he collaborated and interacted with other notable artists residing in Carona, such as Meret Oppenheim, David Weiss, Markus Raetz, Urs Lüthi, Christoph Wenger, and Anton Bruhin. Schweri dedicated himself to drawing during this period, producing numerous works using various techniques. Many of these drawings, created in Carona, are preserved in his estate.

From 1974 to 1976, Schweri organized and managed the biological food store Mr. Natural in Zürich. This store was one of the first in Switzerland to sell macrobiotic and organic foods, gaining recognition far beyond Swiss borders as a pioneer of today's organic food movement.

Beginning in 1975, Peter Schweri traveled to Greece, Egypt, and Sudan. Later, from 1977 to 1983, he traveled extensively to Greece, France, and Egypt. During his time in Greece, he spent a year windsurfing and living out of a Mercedes D190 van, which he had personally customized. He continued to use this van for travel from 1984 to 1989.

Schweri was a profound thinker and an insightful researcher. In 1986, his understanding of the "Universal Skeleton of Art" inspired him to develop the ArtCode86, a system for creating art compositions using mathematical constraints. This concept deeply fascinated him and became a central focus of his work.

In the summer of 1994, Paul Tanner, director of the ETH Zurich Graphic Collection, organized a group exhibition titled Kicking Boxes Billiard at ETH Zurich. This exhibition provided Schweri with the opportunity to meet computer scientist Jürg Gutknecht. As a result of their collaboration, Schweri was invited to work at an office in the ETH Zurich computer center, where he remained from 1994 until 2001, the onset of his blindness.

During this period, Schweri and Gutknecht developed the Sakkara system, which allowed the drafting of "visual scores" for art compositions and both computer- and internet-based presentations. This innovation made it possible to create the first dynamic constructive artworks. Schweri conceptualized a unique form of art he called "Dynamic Art," which included the creation of interactive totems.

After three years of intensive study of internet technologies, Schweri was recognized in 1997 as an internet expert by the Institute for Computer Systems at ETH Zurich. In the same year, he launched his first internet art site. From 1997 to 2001, he continued to develop his "Dynamic Art" on the internet. These evolutions enabled artistic forms to change fundamentally in real time, with durations ranging from a few seconds to several billion years, depending on the configuration of the totem.

Due to a Caldwell-Luc operation, performed without anesthesia during his childhood, Peter Schweri’s vision steadily deteriorated over the years. By 1999, his vision was reduced to just 5% of normal. Despite this, he continued to work independently on all his art systems and, in 2001, developed a new, refined Dynamic Art internet site.

In 2002, at the age of 63, Schweri became completely blind. He died in Zürich on 25 November 2016. His estate is managed by the artist Stella Diess.

== Project Wirsindkunst ==
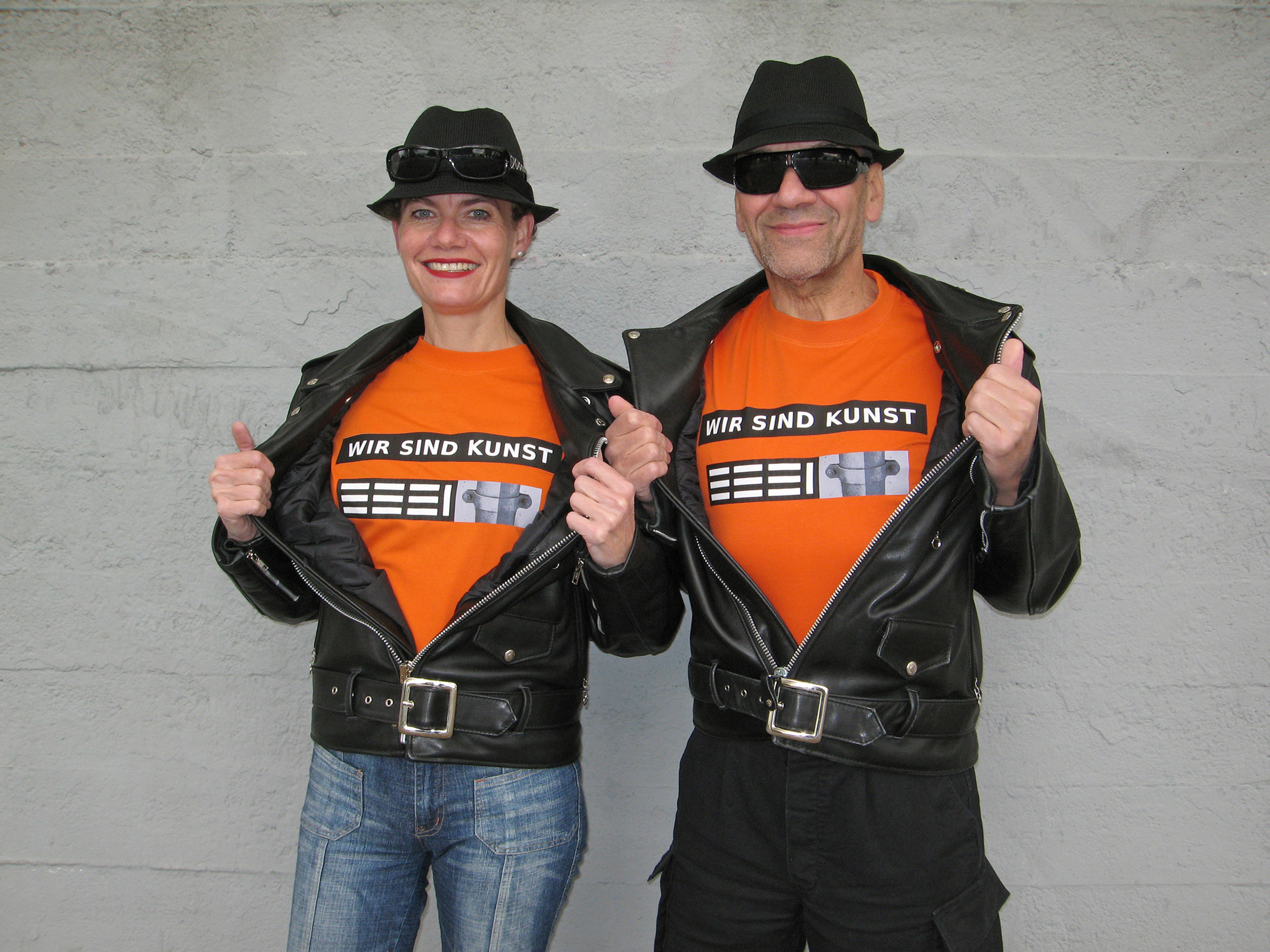
WirsindKunst: Peter Schweri·Stella Diess 2006

In the summer of 2005, Peter Schweri met Stella Diess (birth name: Esther Bettina Diess), the daughter of actress Miriam Spoerri and actor Karl Walter Diess. She is also the niece of Daniel Spoerri and Theophil Spoerri. Schweri and Diess developed an intense artistic collaboration and deep friendship that lasted until Schweri’s death in November 2016.

Starting in 2005, the Schweri-Diess duo collaborated under the label Wirsindkunst ("We Are Art") and created a joint website of the same name, where they showcased their art in the virtual space of the internet. As a blind artist, Schweri sought to extend his concept of "Art with Mathematical Constraints" (ArtCode86) to the tonal level by creating "music compositions with mathematical constraints."

In 2008, Schweri and Diess established a custom music studio in Schweri’s apartment. Under the label Wirsindmusik ("We Are Music"), they created music and launched a joint website to present their compositions online. Despite being completely blind, Schweri learned to use the Yamaha Motif XS8 Music Workstation, while Stella Diess mastered the software for post-production on the computer.

Their first CD, featuring six compositions, was released in 2009, alongside the CD Motion – Peter Plays For Stella (75:05, live performance). In 2012, they composed and released the CD Metronmotion, which included eight pieces of music. Schweri approached his music compositions with the same dedication and precision as he had previously applied to his visual art, continuing to research and refine his creations with great intensity.

As a visual artist, I developed my own visual language in the consciousness of the "universal skeleton of art". In 1986, I invented the "ArtCode86", a self-contained group of 1296 images based on the figure of a double square. I painted some on canvas. At that time, I would not have thought, that I would ever be able to visualize the full "ArtCode86"

— Peter Schweri

== Exhibitions ==
- 1963 Exhibition at the Kunstgewerbeschule Zürich.
- 1964 Exhibition with Hansjörg Mattmüller at the gallery Brönnimann in Berne.
- 1966 Exhibition at the gallery Actuel in Berne and Geneva.
- 1983 Opening Exhibition of the gallery Brigitta Rosenberg in Zürich.
- 1983 Participation at the "Kunstszene Zürich"
- 1986 Magic Group Exhibition with Anton Bruhin, Heinrich Louis Ney und René Wohlgemuth at the gallery Ursula Wiedenkeller in Zürich.
- 1986 Participation at the "Kunstszene Zürich".
- 1986, 1987 und 1988 Exhibition at the gallery Silvio R. Baviera in Zürich.
- 1987, 1988 Permanent Exhibition at the own gallery Rotpunkt on Seilergraben in Zürich.
- 1989 Private Exhibition for the 50th birthday of Peter Schweri in Zürich, sponsored by Marcel and Marcel.
- 1990, 1991 Exhibitions at the gallery Brigitte Weiss in Zürich.
- 1991 Group Exhibition with Bino Bühler and Heinz Keller at the Wengihof in Zürich.
- 1991 Group Exhibition in the Helmhaus Zürich.
- 1992, 1993 Group Exhibition at the Kunsthaus Oerlikon in Zürich.
- 1994 Group Exhibition with Reiner Ruthenbeck, Imi Knoebel, Blinky Palermo, Peter Schweri, Helmut Federle, John Armleder, Jean-Luc Manz, Peter Fischli / David Weiss, Günther Förg, Gerwald Rockenschaub, Heimo Zobernig "Kicking boxes billiard" at the "Graphischen Sammlung der ETH" in Zürich.
- 1994 Exhibition «Zürcher Künstler, ach was» at the Museum Baviera, Zürich.
- 1995 Group Exhibition «10 Jahre Art Magazin» (10 years Art Magazine) in Zürich.
- 1996 Solo Exhibition «Roll Over Malewich – The Flying Double Square» at the «Säulenhalle» of the ETH Zurich. Lectures with big digital projection in the «Auditorium Maximum» of the ETH Zurich on the issue of «Writing Art pictures».
- 1999 Group Exhibition "Hansjörg Mattmüller – eine falsche Symmetrie" (with former students of Hansjörg Mattmüller, u. a. Simon Beer, Anton Bruhin, H. R. Giger, Urs Lüthi, Muda Mathis, Walter Pfeiffer, Christian Rothacher, Klaudia Schifferle, Peter Schweri, Costa Vece, David Weiss) in the museum/gallery Silvio R. Baviera, Zürich.
- 1999 Group Exhibition PAGE, Zürich, "Pixel Art 01" Forum für Originalgrafik in Zürich (mit u. a. Cornelia Hesse-Honegger, Urs Lüthi, Vera Molnar, Yves Netzhammer, Martin Schwarz, Peter Schweri, Walter Pfeiffer)
- 1999 Solo Exhibition at the Showcase Gallery, Zürich.
- 2005 Participation at the Event 150 years ETH in Zürich
- 2007 ETH/library Special Exhibition on the issue of "Alles ist Spiel! Unterhaltungsmathematik in historischer Perspektive" / Teilnahme mit dem ArtCode86. (Everything is game! Entertainment mathematics in historical perspective / Participation with the ArtCode86)
- 2013 Helmhaus Zürich, Serge Stauffer / Kunst als Forschung (Art as research) – film material and drawings of Peter Schweri.
- 2017 Helmhaus Zürich, «Keine Zeit – Kunst aus Zürich» – original paintings, drawings, ArtCode86, 16mm-film from 1969 of Peter Schweri in the «kleinen Helmhaus»
- 2018 Peter Schweris Artsystems "DYNAMIC ART", as they were published on the internet from 1994 to 2012, can be shown again in 2018 after a complete reprogramming.
- 2018 Group Exhibition at the gallery Weiss/Falk in Basel «CARONA» (with Anton Bruhin, Hermann Hesse, Matthyas Jenny, Urs Lüthi, Meret Oppenheim, Markus Raetz, Iwan Schumacher, Peter Schweri, David Weiss)
- 2021 Group Exhibition at Fabbrica Culturale Baviera, CH-6745 Giornico (with Sigmar Polke, Balthasar Burkhard, Hans Danuser, Luciano Castelli, Urs Lüthi, Manon, Dieter Meier, Walter Pfeiffer, Klaudia Schifferle, Kerim Seiler, Annelies Strba.
- 2023 Exhibition «MENTAL MASK» at Suns.Work gallery in Zürich (with Gregory Sugnaux)
- 2025: Group Exhibition at the MASI Museum Lac, Lugano «David Weiss The Dream of Casa Aprile Carona 1968-1978» (with David Weiss, Anton Bruhin, Matthyas Jenny, Urs Lüthi, Meret Oppenheim, Esther Altorfer, Willy Spiller, Iwan Schumacher, Peter Schweri)[34]

== Awards ==
Paul Tanner, director of the Graphic Collection at ETH Zurich, and artist David Weiss recommended Peter Schweri for the Zollikon 2003 Art Prize. On 4 May 2003, the Art Prize Zollikon, awarded by the Dr. K. and H. Hintermeister-Gyger Foundation and endowed with 10,000 Swiss francs, was presented to Schweri during an official ceremony held in the Zollikon community hall. The event included a laudation by Hansjörg Mattmüller.

== Selected bibliography ==
- Lexikon der Schweiz XX. Jahrhundert. Verlag Huber & Co. AG. Frauenfeld 1958–1967.
- Silvio R. Baviera: Die Durchtunnelung der Normalität. Verlag Um die Ecke, Zürich 1996.
- Andreas Züst: Bekannte Bekannte 2. Edition Patrick Frey, Zürich 1996.
- Georg Radanowicz: Raum für Räume. The story of the first «Pop-Art-Happening» in Zürich, Zürich 2005.
- Werner Kieser: Die Entdeckung des Eisens. Stationen meines Lebens. Econ Verlag Berlin / 2008
- Aargauer Kunsthaus/Sammlung Andreas Züst: Memorizer. Der Sammler Andreas Züst. Scheidegger & Spiess, Zürich 2009.
- Silvio R. Baviera: Kult Zürich Aussersihl. Das andere Gesicht. Verlag Um die Ecke, Zürich 2010.
- Kunsthaus Chur: David Weiss. Exhibition in the Kunsthaus Chur. 2014. in the book on the exhibition are photographs of David Weiss and family made by Peter Schweri in 1979.
- Swiss Institute New York: David Weiss. Exhibition in the Swiss Institute New York. 2014. In the book on the exhibition are photographs of David Weiss and Family made by Peter Schweri in 1979.
- Nieves Verlag Zürich: Zine Peter Schweri on the occasion of the exposition "Mental Mask" at Suns.Works gallery Zürich. 2023.
