= Hermann Noack =

Art foundry in Berlin, Germany

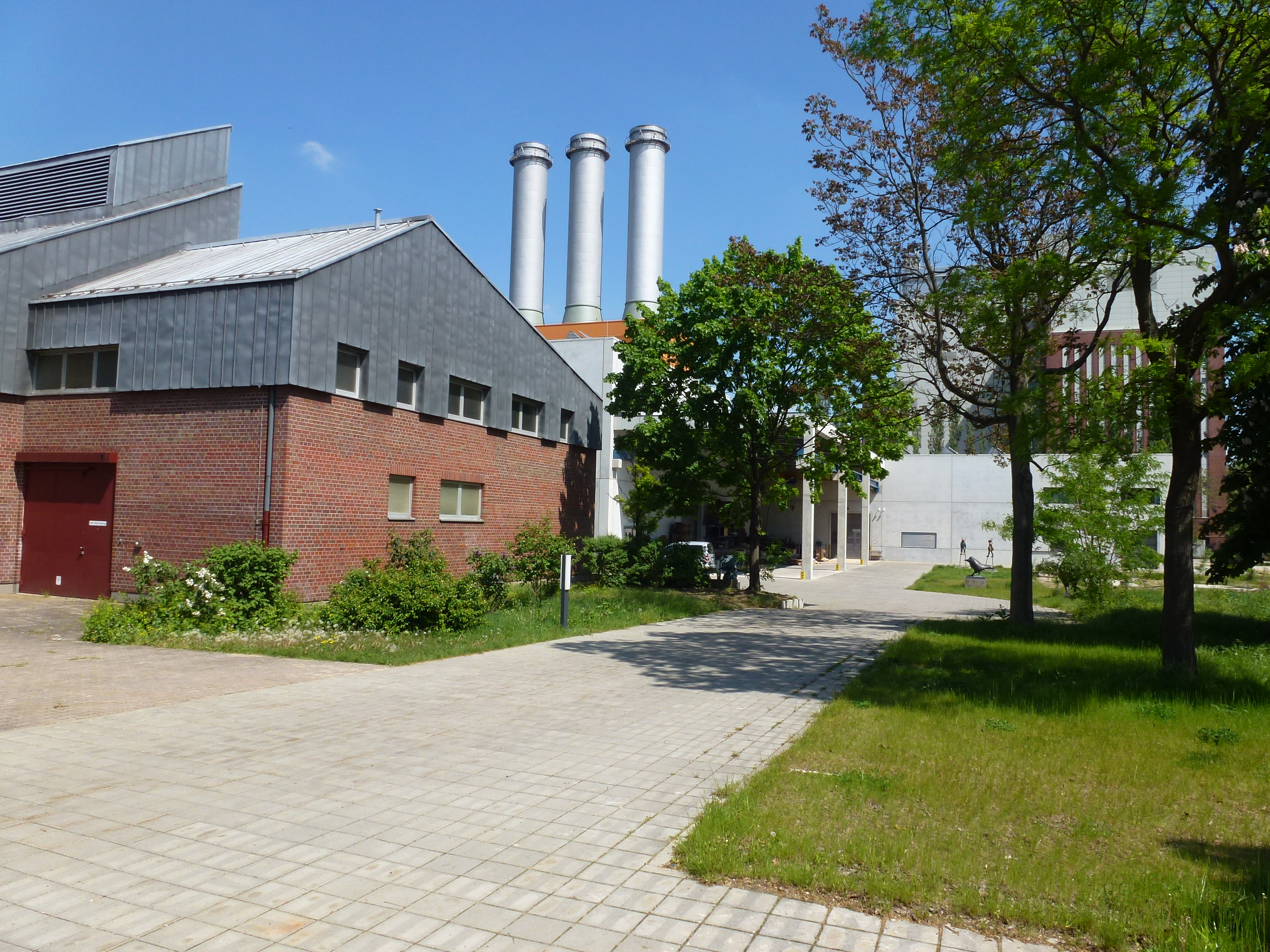
Hermann Noack foundry in Charlottenburg

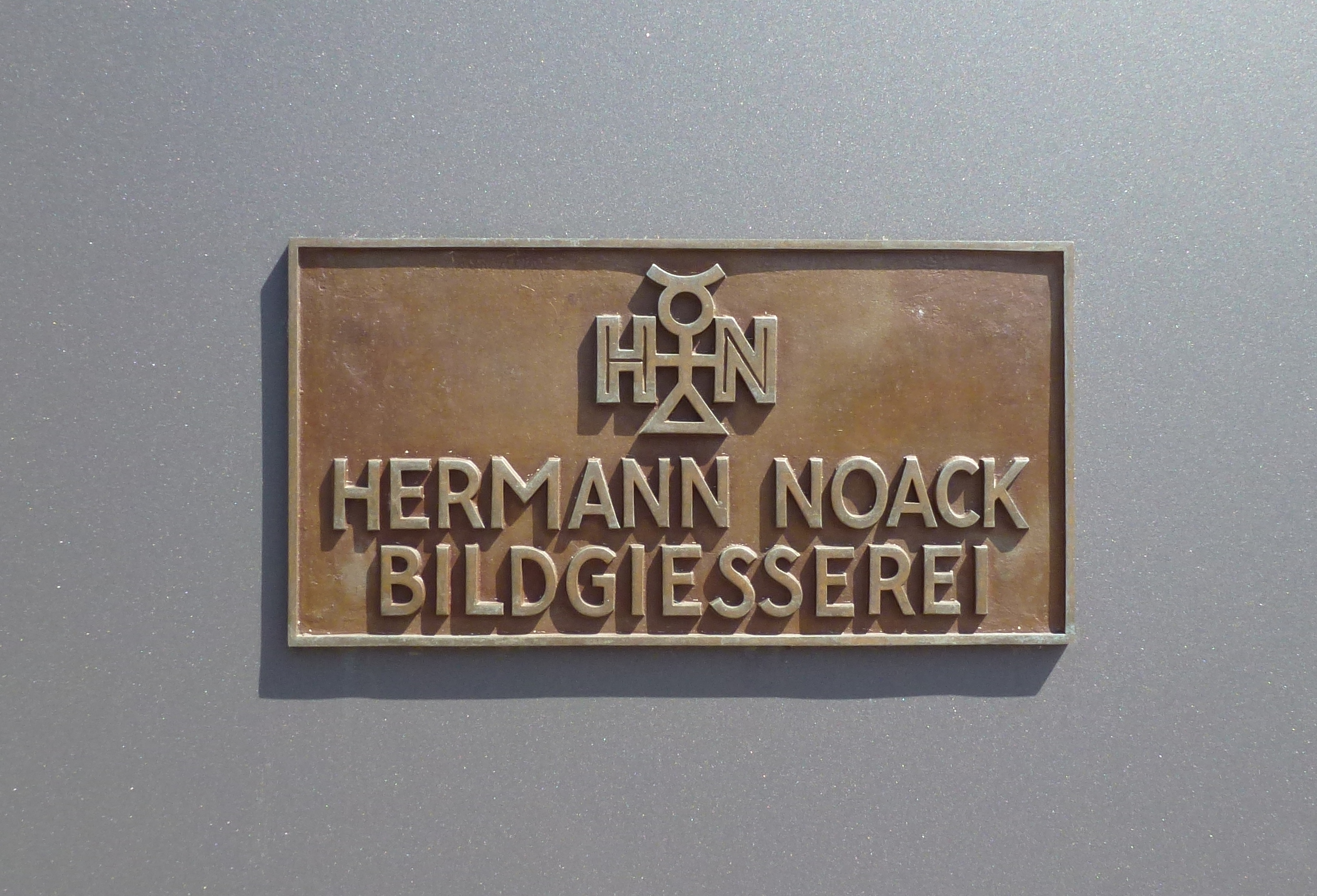
Nameplate of the Hermann Noack art foundry

Hermann Noack, or Noack Foundry (German: Bildgießerei Hermann Noack GmbH & Co.), is a German art foundry in Berlin, named after its original proprietor and his three direct descendants, all with the same name, who have run the business. Most of its works are cast in bronze.

== History ==
The company was founded by Hermann Noack in 1897, with early support from the sculptors August Gaul and Fritz Klimsch. Noack was born in Oberlausitz and educated in Lauchhammer. He learned his craft at the Gladenbeck foundry before setting up his own business. He had worked on the National Kaiser Wilhelm Monument by Reinhold Begas.

The foundry has been run by four generations of the same family, all with the same name:

- Hermann Noack I (1867-1941)
- Hermann Noack II (1895-1958)
- Hermann Noack III (born 1931)
- Hermann Noack IV (born 1966)

The business moved to Fehlerstraße in Friedenau, then a small settlement near Berlin. The premises were rebuilt after the Second World War, and the foundry remained in Friedenau until 2009. It moved to a new, larger 10,000 square metres (110,000 sq ft) building in Charlottenburg in 2010, on Am Spreebord near the River Spree.

== Work ==
The company cast the work of sculptor Renée Sintenis from 1913 onwards, and has cast replicas of her Berliner Bär, used as the statuette for the Golden Bear award in the Berlin International Film Festival, since the third Berlinale in 1953,

The company was involved with the restoration of Johann Gottfried Schadow's copper quadriga on the Brandenburg Gate in the 1950s, and the restoration of Friedrich Drake's gilded statue of Victory on the Berlin Victory Column.

Noack also cast the Mother with her Dead Son by Käthe Kollwitz in the Neue Wache, and has made many other works for dozens of artists, including Hans Arp, Ernst Barlach, Georg Baselitz, Joseph Beuys, Alexander Calandrelli, Luciano Castelli, August Gaul, Rainer Fetting, Georg Kolbe, Bernhard Heiliger, Anselm Kiefer, Fritz Koenig, Käthe Kollwitz, Ingo Kühl, Wilhelm Lehmbruck, Markus Lüpertz, Gerhard Marcks, Henry Moore, Jonathan Meese, Oskar Schlemmer, Karl Schmidt-Rottluff, Wolf Vostell and Ben Wagin.

Other items made by the foundry included medals made for the Nazi regime, and war memorials for the Soviet Union.

== People ==
Herman Noack III won the Admiral's Cup in 1983, with his yacht Sabina.
