= Gläsker =

Gläsker or Glasker is a surname. Notable people with the surname include:

- Horst Gläsker (born 1949), German artist
- Isaiah Glasker (born 2002), American football player
