= Artist collective =

Group of artists working together towards shared aims

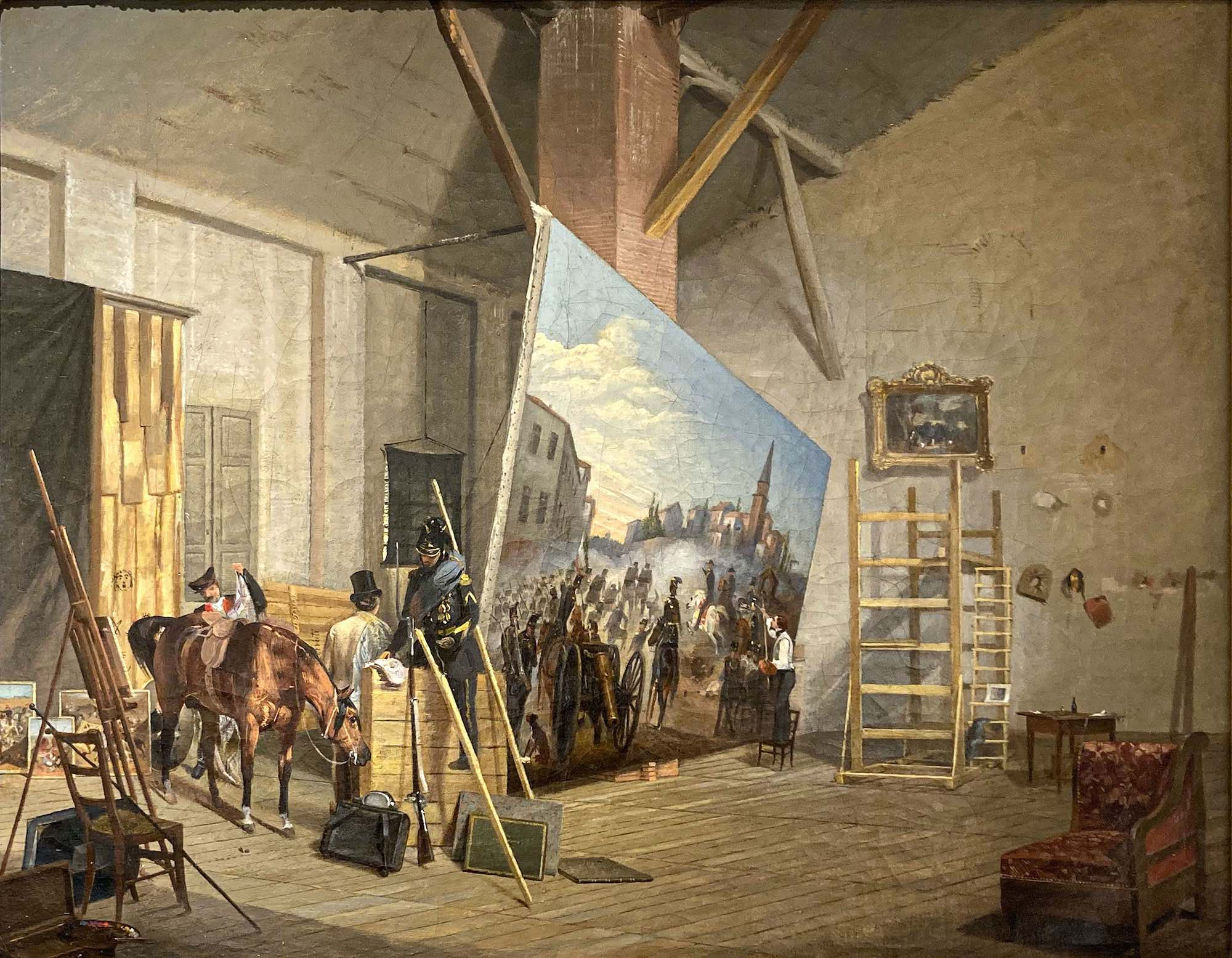
A workshop

An artist collective or art group or artist group is an initiative that is the result of a group of artists working together, usually under their own management, towards shared aims. The aims of an artist collective can include almost anything that is relevant to the needs of the artist; this can range from purchasing bulk materials, sharing equipment, space or materials, to following shared ideologies, aesthetic and political views or even living and working together as an extended family. Sharing of ownership, risk, benefits, and status is implied, as opposed to other, more common business structures with an explicit hierarchy of ownership such as an association or a company.

Many artist collectives had and still have a major and significant influence on the various epochs of art history. In a broader sense, literary groups and group formations of musicians can also be referred to as artist collectives or groups.

== Description ==
=== Purpose ===
The aim of the artistic initiatives was and still is to get in touch with other artists, to point out avant-garde or newly defined efforts in art in the broadest sense, to break away from traditional, academic approaches altogether, to break new ground and to follow them for example by organizing joint exhibitions. The boundaries between all areas of fine and applied art are fluid.

In contrast to the mostly programmatically oriented artist collectives, only the costs for the use of common workspaces or artist ateliers are usually shared in studio communities. Due to long-standing friendships, thematic joint exhibitions and the inevitable examination of the work of the other members, however, mixed forms can form that go beyond the pure community of convenience.

=== Between Artist Duo and Artists' Colony ===
The transition from artist collective to artist colony is also fluid. One speaks of the latter when it comes to large-scale settlements of artists of the same direction. Examples of this are the Nazarene movement in Rome and the Barbizon school. The decisive factor here is the personal decision of the individual to align their place of residence with that of like-minded artists, which can be conducive to the optimal further development of the respective art movement.

The opposite extreme of an artist group is the artist duo – the smallest, but also the most symbiotic form. Often there are real-life partnerships (as with Niki de Saint Phalle and Jean Tinguely, or also with Gilbert & George). It is not uncommon for larger groups of artists to emerge from the "nucleus" of a duo, such as the Pre-Raphaelite Brotherhood, for example, developed from the founding duo John Everett Millais and William Holman Hunt.

=== Criteria for the term "art collective" or "art group" ===
Designations such as "The Tachists" or Junge Wilde (The Young Wild Ones) cannot be assigned to any real groups of artists; they merely indicate common stylistic features within an epoch. A clear indication of the actual existence of such a group is a written memorandum such as that published in André Breton's Surrealist Manifesto in Paris in 1924 and signed by several like-minded artists. As a result, the members of such a group committed themselves to subordinate themselves to a common goal. This also included the group exhibitions, to which everyone should contribute their part instead of just showing themselves.

== Overview ==
Artist collectives have occurred throughout history, often gathered around central resources, for instance the ancient sculpture workshops at the marble quarries on Milos in Greece and Carrara in Italy. During the French Revolution the Louvre in Paris was occupied as an artist collective.

More traditional artist collectives tend to be smallish groups of two to eight artists who produce work, either collaboratively or as individuals toward exhibiting together in gallery shows or public spaces. Often an artist collective will maintain a collective space, for exhibiting or as workshop or studio facilities. Some newer, more experimental kinds of groups include intentional networks, anonymous, connector, hidden or nested groups, and groups with unconventional time-scales.

Artist collectives may be formed:

- for economic reasons, to give members volume purchasing power and allow costs of publicity and shows to be shared,
- for political reasons, to increase local lobbying power for arts infrastructure, to gather behind a cause or belief,
- for professional reasons, to develop a higher group profile that benefits the individuals by association, to create a hub for curators and commissioners to more easily locate potential talent.

== See also ==
- Artist cooperative
- Art colony
- Art movements
- Art association
- Musical collective
