= Walter Dahn =

German painter and photographer (1954–2024)

Walter Dahn (8 October 1954 – 7 November 2024) was a German painter, photographer, and sound artist. He was born in Tönisvorst, North Rhine-Westphalia. He was one of the most important representatives of the Neue Wilde of the 1980s. Dahn taught painting at the Braunschweig University of Art.

He died in Cologne on 7 November 2024, at the age of 70.
