= Berit Heggenhougen-Jensen =

Danish artist (born 1956)

Berit Heggenhougen-Jensen (born 1956) is a Danish artist who played a central role in the Danish Wild Youth artistic trend in the 1980s. She gained recognition from her participation in the 1982 exhibition Kniven på hovedet (Knife on the Head) held at Tranegården in Gentofte.

== Biography ==
Born in Copenhagen on 31 May 1956, she is the daughter of Frode Hans Erling Jensen, a teacher, and Turid Jensen (maiden name Heggenhougen) a nurse. She attended the Royal Danish Academy of Fine Arts under Hein Heinsen, Stig Brøgger, Helge Bertram and Torben Christensen, completing her studies in 1990. She later studied at the Ecole des Hautes Etudes en Sciences Sociales in Paris (1999–2004). She played a central role in the Wild Youth trend which reached Denmark in 1982 with the Kniven på hovedet exhibition at Tranegården which had been inspired by German artists.

Over the years, Heggenhougen-Jensen's use of painting, installations, photography and video has evolved in phases but she characteristically dismantles conventional approaches playing with words, materials and historical references. One of her principal works is Schlager (Hits) from 1991 which is in Statens Museum for Kunst. It demonstrates her use of a landscape as a notice board on which she can place symbols of the cultural indecision of the 1980s. The work was created at the same time as her exhibition Frøken Jensens gastronomiske indetermination and the book she wrote to accompany it. In Schlager, she uses some of the same elements: photographs of nude women, gramophone records, a rocking chair and boots resembling those of van Gogh.

Heggenhougen-Jensen's works have been exhibited widely. They can be seen in the European Parliament's Art Collection in Brussels, in Statens Museum for Kunst, Copenhagen, and in Moderna Museet, Stockholm, as well as in several regional art museums in Denmark.

== Published works ==
- Jensen, Berit (1991). Frøken Jensens gastronomiske indetermination (in Danish). Galleri C. ISBN 978-87-89471-14-3.
