= Luciano Castelli =

Swiss artist and musician (born 1951)

- Born: 28 September 1951 (age 75); Lucerne, Switzerland
- Occupations: Painter, graphic artist, photographer, sculptor and musician
- Website: https://www.lucianocastelli.com/

Luciano Castelli (born 28 September 1951 in Lucerne) is a Swiss painter, graphic artist, photographer, sculptor and musician.

== Life and work ==
=== Lucerne: model, self-promoter, Art Star ===
Luciano Castelli visited the preliminary course of the School of Applied Arts where he studied with Max von Moos. Then he learned signwriting and became in the early 1970s the key figure in Lucerne's Bohemia. Castelli and his residential community became part of art history through snapshots that artist Franz Gertsch transformed into monumental photorealistic paintings. In addition to "Luciano Castelli I", "At Luciano's House" and "Marina making up Luciano", it was mainly "Medici", a group portrait of "the long-haired freaks around the shrill painter Luciano Castelli" that became the "cover picture of Harald Szeemann's documenta 5". Castelli was invited to participate as an artist too in Documenta 5, where he presented sculptures of everyday objects such as a shoe or a handkerchief that could also be used as a chillum. Castelli became a star of the art world. Much he owed to Jean-Christophe Ammann, the former assistant of Szeemann and director of the Museum of Art Lucerne, who had brought him into contact with Gertsch and invited him at the Documenta. 1974 Ammann showed in his seminal exhibition "Transformer - Aspects of Travesty" androgynous photos of Castelli. The exhibition represented also the Surrealist Pierre Molinier, who later staged Castelli for photos. Castelli’s androgynous self-styling was influenced by the aesthetics of Glam Rock, but then he began to fathom other roles like the young conservative, the movie star or the sadomasochist.

=== Berlin: Junge Wilde and Punk ===
1978 Castelli went to Berlin and became part of the circle around the Galerie am Moritzplatz, to which he adapted with his expressive, fast painting. The painters who demarcated from intellectualism and the severity of the 1970s avant-garde, became a part of art history as Neue Wilde. Castelli painted works together with Salomé as well as with Rainer Fetting. Together with Salomé he founded the avant-garde punk band Geile Tiere (Horny Animals), where he sang and played bass. The band was closely associated with the Berlin Club Jungle and obtained notoriety by shrill appearances. With Salomé and Fetting Castelli undertook in 1982 a tour through France with performance concerts.

=== Paris: Camera Obscura and Revolving Paintings ===
In 1989 Castelli settled down in Paris and married two years later Alexandra, who he painted over and over again. He experimented with a home-made camera obscura and developed his Revolving Paintings. They can be turned 360° and have no defined upper edge. Depending on how they are hung, the viewer sees other faces, bodies, or city views. The motives "overlap and penetrate each other, giving supposedly abstract structures that turn out to be representational when the corresponding motive stays right," writes Peter K. Wehrli.

=== Comeback ===
Currently Castelli witnesses a growing interest in his work. His photographic self-portraits have been published in a book by renowned art publisher Edition Patrick Frey and shown in a broad overview exhibition in Paris. In 2015 the National Art Museum of China in Beijing presents a major exhibition on the paintings that then goes to the Contemporary Art Museum in Shanghai. For China Castelli developed engines, which slowly rotate the Revolving Paintings by 360°.

=== Miscellaneous ===
- 1985 Luciano Castelli portrayed musician Stephan Eicher for the cover of the LP I Tell This Night.
- In 2011, the Gertsch Portrait "Luciano 1" was sold at an auction by Sotheby's at a price of 2.3 million Swiss francs.

== Literature ==
- Luciano Castelli: Piratin Fu. Luciano Castelli, 1985, Catalog Galerie Eric Franck, Genf.
- Billeter, Erika (1986). Luciano Castelli. Ein Maler träumt sich. A painter who dreams himself (in German). Bern, Switzerland: Benteli. ISBN 978-3716505410.
- A look behind the screen. Luciano Castelli, 1986, Catalog Raab Galerie, Berlin.
- Castelli, Luciano. Images/Bilder 1972-1988, 1989, Benteli, Bern.
- Luciano Castelli, Catalog, 1990, Galerie Raab, Berlin und London.
- Luciano Castelli, 1991, Catalog Galerie Fischer, Luzern
- Erika Billeter: Luciano Castelli. Die geträumte Frau/La femme revee/The dreamed woman, 1993, Benteli, Bern.
- Revolving Paintings. Luciano Castelli, Benteli, Wabern-Bern 1998, ISBN 3-7165-1121-8.
- Luciano Castelli: Le Miroir du Desir, 1996, Editions Maison Europeenne de la Photographie, Paris.
- Jean-Michel Ribettes: Luciano Castelli, Catalog, Edition Mennour 2001, ISBN 9782914171069.
- Luciano Castelli: Arbeiten aus den Jahren 1979 bis 1999. Galerie Michael Schultz, Berlin 2001.
- Matthias Liebel: Luciano Castelli - 30 Jahre Malerei. Das malerische Oeuvre des Künstlers von seinen Anfängen bis Ende der 90er Jahre. Dissertation, Universität Bamberg 2006 (Volltext).
- Luciano Castelli. Self-Portrait 1973-1986. Verlag Patrick Frey, Zürich 2014, ISBN 978-3-905929-57-7.
- Harald Szeemann: Documenta 5. Befragung der Realität - Bildwelten heute. Neue Galerie, Schöne Aussicht, Museum Fridericianum, Friedrichsplatz, Kassel. Bertelsmann, München 1972, ISBN 3-570-02856-9.
- Jean-Christophe Ammann (Hrsg.): Transformer – Aspekte der Travestie. Catalog, Kunstmuseum Luzern 1974.
- Schweizer Kunst 70-80. Regionalismus/ Internationalismus; Bilanz einer neuen Haltung in der Schweizerkunst der 70er Jahre am Beispiel von 30 Künstlern. - Vol. II: Libro d'artista, 15 artisti formano agniuno 15 pagine. J. M. Armleder, Luciano Castelli, Martin Disler, Marianne Eigenheer, Heiner Kielholz, Urs Lüthi, Chasper-Otto Melcher, Markus Raetz, Claude Sandoz, Jean Frederic Schnyder, Hugo Suter, Niele Toroni, Aldo Walker, Ilse Weber, Rolf Winnewisser. 1981 Kunstmuseum Luzern, ISBN 326700022X.
- 30 Künstler aus der Schweiz. Galerie Kritzinger, Innsbruck, Frankfurter Kunstverein, Galerie St. Stephan, Wien.1981.
