= Balthasar Burkhard =

Swiss photographer (1944–2010)

- Born: 24 December 1944; Bern
- Died: 16 April 2010 (aged 65)
- Known for: Photography
- Style: Large-format photography

Balthasar Burkhard (24 December 1944 – 16 April 2010) was a Swiss photographer who received international recognition for his large-format monochromatic photographic series.

== Life ==
Born in Bern in 1944, Burkhard was apprenticed to photographer Kurt Blum. After opening his studio in 1965, he was retained as documentation photographer by the Kunsthalle Bern, cooperating closely with curator Harald Szeemann and portraying many artists. This triggered Burkhard's interest in contemporary art. He came to international attention in 1969 through the exhibition of large-format photographs created together with the Bernese artist Markus Raetz, which included a 1:1 scale photograph of Raetz's study. Burkhard and Raetz were the first artists worldwide to expose photographs directly onto canvases using a self-developed technique.

After moving to the United States, Burkhard tried to find work as an actor in Hollywood, thinking that his distinctive face might make him suited for a career as a movie villain. Instead, he was appointed Visiting Lecturer of Photography at the University of Illinois in Chicago, where he taught from 1976 to 1978. His first dedicated exhibition in 1977 at the Zolla/Lieberman Gallery in Chicago was followed by regular stays in New York and participation in film projects.

After his return to Switzerland in 1983, he worked in La Chaux-de-Fonds and Bern, cooperating with several other artists. His works came to be regularly exhibited worldwide, at times in up to 20 group exhibitions simultaneously. From 1990 to 1992, Burkhard taught as a visiting lecturer at the Ecole des Beaux-Arts de Nîmes, having moved to France in 1990. Towards the end of the 20th century, he began to focus on urban photography and directed the film Ciudad (film). In 2007, he married Vida Rudis, a teacher whom he had met in Chicago.

== Work ==
Burkhard, who almost always worked in black and white, was best known for his large-format photographic series. These images have been described as centering "on a stock of clearly defined subjects which he carefully extracts one by one from their context", as for instance with the photograph of an arm that filled an entire exhibition hall in the Kunsthalle Basel in 1983.

His work has been praised for its "hermeticism and poetic depth", characterized as that of a "hyperrealist dreamer" and placed in the tradition of Tanizaki Junichiro and Gustave Courbet, whom Burkhard admired; his photographic reflections on the painter's work were made part of the great Courbet exposition of 2007 in the Grand Palais. A central theme in Burkhard's work was the depiction of the female sex, in an approach that has been interpreted as the "search for the primordial goddess, the focus of all desires". Women were notably the focus of a 1970s Polaroid nudes series with Markus Raetz, the theme of a noted series of photographs on the nape and feet of a geisha, and the topic of a number of huge images shown in 2008 in the Songlines exhibition at the Museum Franz Gertsch in Burgdorf.

Burkhard and his work are the subject of an episode of the 2005 3sat documentary series PHOTOsuisse. His photographs have been published in several coffee-table books.
