= Michel Sima =

French sculptor

- Born: Michał Smajewski; 20 May 1912; Slonim, Poland (present-day Belarus)
- Died: 12 April 1987 (aged 74); Largentière, France
- Education: Acadèmie de la Grande Chaumière
- Known for: Photography, Sculpture, Ceramics
- Notable work: Picasso à Antibes; Faces of modern art

Michel Sima, a pseudonym for Michał Smajewski (20 May 1912 – 12 April 1987 ), was a Polish artist, known as a sculptor, photographer and ceramicist. He is best known for his photographic portraits of Picasso and of almost all the artists of the School of Paris.

== Biography ==
Michał Smajewski was born on 20 May 1912 in Slonim Poland (now Belarus). Born in a liberal middle class Jewish family, he arrived in Paris in 1929, 17 years old, and was admitted into the "Académie de la Grande Chaumière". From his earliest years, he wanted to become a sculptor.

In 1933, he joins the group of the painter Francis Gruber. He works in the Brâncuși's and Ossip Zadkine's studios, among others, and earns a living taking photos of current events for various newspapers.

He socialized in Gertrude and Leo Stein's circle and makes friends with famous people such as Jean Cocteau, Francis Picabia, Paul Éluard, Robert Desnos, Max Ernst, Pierre Tal-Coat and Youki Foujita. In 1936 he met Picasso. He took part in many group exhibitions in Paris and on the Riviera.

During World War II he sought refuge in the "Zone libre" but in 1942 was arrested in Golfe Juan as a Jewish foreigner and sent to Auschwitz then to Blechhammer (Judenlager), while an exhibition of his work together with Picabia's in Cannes enjoyed a great success.

Seriously ill, he returned to France in 1945, and spent months recovering in Grasse at his friend Dor de la Souchère's in Cannes.

In 1946 in Golfe Juan, he met Picasso again, and obtained for him a large studio in the Grimaldi museum in Antibes, given by Dor de la Souchère. In this studio Picasso creates "La Joie de Vivre" and "Le Triptyque".

Following Picasso's advice, Sima turns to photography. He's too weak to work as a full-time sculptor, but he continued creating small pieces and engravings, and working in ceramic.

He gave his personal opinions to Picasso about his works and provided him with documents. It resulted to the book : "Picasso à Antibes" published in 1948. Sima then began to specialize in portraits.

His first book was published in 1959 by editor Fernand Nathan: 21 Visages d'artistes (21 Faces of Artists). Seeing the poor quality of the copies, Sima's disappointment was so great that he decides to stop publishing photos.

In 1967, his old friend, the painter René Besset invited him to the Ardèche. Sima decided to move there with his family, although he kept his studio at "La Ruche" in Paris. From this time to his death in 1987, he kept testing new materials and searching for new forms in his sculptures.

== Books by Michel Sima ==
- (fr) Picasso à Antibes, photographies de Michel Sima, commentées par Paul Eluard, introduction par Jaime Sabartès, Paris, René Drouin, 1948.
- (fr) 21 visages d’artistes, photographies de Michel Sima, préface de Jean Cocteau, Paris, Fernand Nathan, 1959.
- Faces of modern art, photography by Michel Sima, preface by Jean Cocteau, translated by Gloria Levy, Tudor Publishing Co., New York, 1959

== Public museum collections ==
- Picasso museum in Antibes
- Picasso museum in Barcelona
- Picasso museum in Málaga
- Arp Foundation in Clamart
- Fondation Alberto et Annette Giacometti in Paris
- Documentation center of the Matisse museum in Nice
- Würth collection

== Bibliography ==
- Billeter, Erika (2008). Michel Sima: Ateliers d'artiste (in French). Editions Snoeck. ISBN 978-9053496770.
- (in French) Jean-Louis Andral, Michel Sima, Anne de Staël, L'atelier des combles, co-édition Musée Picasso, Antibes, éditions Hazan, Paris, 2008
- Jean-Louis Andral, Pierre Daix, Picasso : la Joie de Vivre (1946–1949), Skira, 2007
- (in French) Maurice Fréchuret, Françoise Gilot, Michel Sima, 1946, Picasso et la Méditerranée retrouvée, Nice, Grégoire Garedette éditions, 1996
- Mark Haworth-Booth, « The artist as subject. The photographs of Michel Sima », in Paul Josefowitz (CM), Apollo (magazine), No 428, October 1997, London, monthly ISSN 0003-6536

== Filmography ==
- Christian Tran, Picasso et Sima, le modeleur d'amitié, production Artis, Lyon TV, 2009, 58 mn, (English subtitles)
