= Salomé (artist) =

German painter (born 1954)

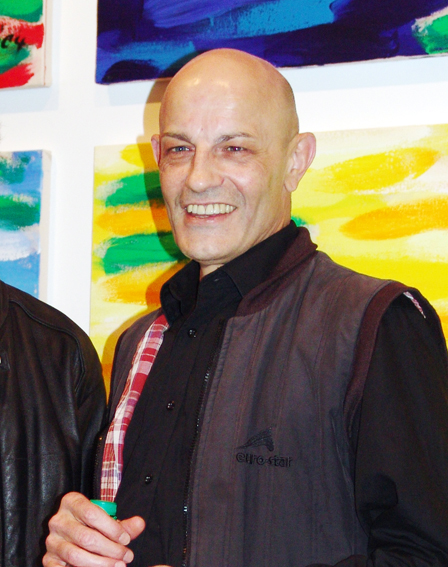
- Salomé at the Opening reception at Gallery Deschler in Berlin, 2006, photo by Henning von Berg
- Born: Wolfgang Ludwig Cihlarz; 24 August 1954 (age 71); Karlsruhe, West Germany (now Germany)
- Occupation: Artist
- Website: https://www.salomeberlin.de/

Salomé (born 24 August 1954 as Wolfgang Ludwig Cihlarz in Karlsruhe, West Germany) is a German artist. His paintings are in renowned museums and collections all over the world. Salomé became known as one of the members of the art group Junge Wilde (Wild Youth) or Neue Wilde (New Wild Ones). He also is recognized as a sculptor and Punk singer.

== Life ==
Wolfgang Ludwig Cihlarz grew up in a dysfunctional family in Karlsruhe (Baden-Württemberg), West Germany, and completed his training as an architectural draftsman. In 1973 he moved to West Berlin, at the time renowned for its art scene.

There he initially worked as an architectural draftsman for the U.S. Army in Tempelhof and at DETEWE, among others. After passing the entrance exam he enrolled at the Berlin Academy of Art (at the time HfbK – Hochschule für Bildende Kunst, today UdK – Universität der Künste), studying painting with Ulrich Knipsel from 1974 through 1980, later as a student in the master class of Karl Heinz Hödicke.

While a student he temped as a waiter at the clubs “Matalla” and “Dschungel”, as well as in the gay café “Anderes Ufer” (The Other Side). He had met the owner of the latter, Gerhard Hoffmann, in 1974 in the “Homosexuelle Aktion Westberlin” (HAW – Gay Action West Berlin). Hoffmann came up with the pseudonym Salomé in 1974. In “Anderes Ufer” Salomé also met David Bowie, among others, who was at the time enriching the wild Berlin night-life. At this time Salomé was in a relationship with Rainer Fetting.

In 1977 Salomé, together with fellow artists Helmut Middendorf, Bernd Zimmer, Rainer Fetting, Anne Jud, Berthold Schepers, Rolf von Bergmann, and others founded the “Galerie am Moritzplatz” (Gallery at Moritzplatz). Other guests and members joined them later, e.g. Hella Santarossa and Luciano Castelli.

With Luciano Castelli he in 1980 formed the Punk band ”Geile Tiere” (The Horny Animals, new wave music). With wild performances he presented himself in films and radio plays.

In 1980 Salomé was invited to participate in the exhibition “Heftige Malerei” (Wild Paintings) at the Haus am Waldsee, Berlin. That same year he also participated in the exhibition “Les Nouveaux Fauves – Die Neuen Wilden” in Aachen, West Germany. In 1981 he took part in the popular exhibition “Rundschau Deutschland”.

Together with painters like Rainer Fetting, Helmut Middendorf, Bernd Zimmer, Elvira Bach, Luciano Castelli, and Jiri Georg Dokoupil, Salomé now became known as one of the members of the “Wild Style” art group of the Junge Wilde (Wild Youth) or Neue Wilde (New Wild Ones). In 1982, due to the invitation by Rudi Fuchs to participate in the famed international art show “documenta 7” in Kassel (Hesse), West Germany, he had his international break-through.

Salomé began dividing his time between the art metropolises New York and Berlin. He made portraits of numerous VIPs, e.g. the at the time very extravagant Gloria, Princess of Thurn and Taxis, and he was himself portrayed by famous photographers, such as Helmut Newton.

In 1999, after an extended stay in the U.S., he returned to Berlin and reactivated his studio in the space of the former “Galerie am Moritzplatz”.

In cooperation with notable porcelain manufacturers, among others "Philipp Rosenthal" Hutschenreuther, he created painted sculptures and dinner services.

Today Salomé's paintings can be found in renowned museums and private collections all over the world. Among the best known-series are the colorful “Swimmers” and “Water Lilies”. Apart from that there are series with neutral portraits of celebrities, as well as expressly gay themes.

Recently he has again started to produce his own Pop music CDs and he still occasionally performs as a singer. He participates in benefit events on a regular basis.

Salomé lives and works in Berlin.

== Exhibitions (selection) ==
- Heftige Malerei, Gallery Haus am Waldsee, Berlin, Germany, 1980
- documenta 7, Kassel, Germany, 1982
- Schwimmer, Gallery Raab, Berlin, Germany, 1982
- Zeitgeist, Museum Martin-Gropius-Bau, Berlin, Germany, 1982
- Biennale Venedig, Venice, Italy, 1982
- Von hier aus – Zwei Monate neue deutsche Kunst in Düsseldorf, Duesseldorf, Germany, 1984
- BerlinArt 1961–1987, Museum of Modern Art, New York, USA, 1987
- BerlinArt 1961–1987, Museum of Modern Art, San Francisco, USA, 1987
- Refigured Painting in Contemporary German Art, Guggenheim Museum, New York, USA, 1988
- Obsessive Malerei - Ein Rückblick auf die Neuen Wilden, Berlin, Germany, 2003/2004
- Gladiatoren und Maße, Gallery Deschler, Berlin, Germany, 2006
- Wunschbilder, Gallery Deschler, Berlin, Germany, 2008
- PUNK – No One Is Innocent, Museum Kunsthalle Wien, Austria, 2008

== Books ==
- Salomé by Salomé, Edition Cantz, Stuttgart, Germany, 1992, ISBN 3-89322-451-3

== Catalogues (selection) ==
- Heftige Malerei, Gallery Haus am Waldsee, Berlin, Germany, 1980
- Im Westen nichts Neues, Museum Kunstmuseum Luzern, Luzern, Switzerland, 1981
- Katalog Documenta 7, Kassel, Germany, 1982, ISBN 3-920453-02-6
- Zeitgeist, Museum Martin-Gropius-Bau, Berlin, Germany, 1982, ISBN 3-88725-086-9
- Artistic Collaboration in the 20th Century, Hirshhorn Museum, Washington/D.C., USA, 1984
- The European Iceberg', Art Gallery of Ontario, Canada, 1984, ISBN 88-202-0599-8
- An International Survey of Recent Painting and Sculpture, Museum of Modern Art, New York, USA, 1984
- Tiefe Blicke, Dumont Kunstverlag, Cologne, Germany, 1985, ISBN 3-7701-1740-9
- Bienal São Paulo, São Paulo, Brazil, 1985
- Frauen in Deutschland, Gallery Raab, Berlin, Germany, 1986
- Zeitgenoessische Kunst in der Deutschen Bank, Frankfurt, Germany, 1987
- Berlinart 1961–1987, Museum of Modern Art, New York, USA, 1987, ISBN 3-7913-0821-1
- Pictures for the Sky – Kunstdrachen, Goethe Institut, Osaka, Japan, 1988
- Kunst der Gegenwart, Klaus Honnef, Verlag Taschen, Cologne, Germany, 1991, ISBN 3-8228-0063-5
- Heftige Malerei, Collection Wuerth, Thorbecke Verlag, Sigmaringen, Germany, 1996, ISBN 3-7995-3639-6
- Sammlung Wuerth, Swiridoff Verlag, Kuenzelsau, Germany, 2002
- Seerosen Variationen, Edition Salomé, Berlin, Germany, 2004
- Das Achte Feld, Museum Ludwig, Cologne, Germany, 2006, ISBN 978-3-7757-1829-5
- Gladiatoren und Masse, Edition Salomé and Gallery Deschler, Berlin, Germany, 2006
- LUST, Edition Salomé, Berlin, Germany, 2006
- Wunschbilder, Gallery Deschler, Berlin, 2008
