= Junge Wilde =

German-language term

The term Junge Wilde (German for "young wild ones") was originally applied to trends within the art world, and was only later used with reference to politics. At present, the term is used by German-language journalists to describe any group within a tradition that seeks to undermine established authority.

== Artistic movement ==
In 1978, the Junge Wilde painting style arose in the German-speaking world in opposition to established avant garde, minimal art and conceptual art. It was linked to the similar Transavanguardia movement in Italy, the US (neo-expressionism) and France (Figuration Libre). The Junge Wilde artists painted their expressive paintings in bright, intense colors and with quick, broad brushstrokes, influenced by a professor at the Academy of Arts, Berlin, Karl Horst Hödicke (b. 1938). They were sometimes called Neue Wilde.

=== Influential artists ===
- Austria: Siegfried Anzinger, Erwin Bohatsch, Herbert Brandl, Gunter Damisch, Hubert Scheibl, Hubert Schmalix, G.L. Gabriel-Thieler
- Denmark: Berit Heggenhougen-Jensen, Nina Sten-Knudsen
- Germany:
  - Berlin: Luciano Castelli, Rainer Fetting, Andreas Walther, Helmut Middendorf, Salomé, Bernd Zimmer, Elvira Bach, Peter Robert Keil
  - Cologne: Hans Peter Adamski, Peter Bömmels, Walter Dahn, Jiri Georg Dokoupil, Leiko Ikemura, Gerard Kever, Gerhard Naschberger, Volker Tannert, Elias Maria Reti, Stefan Szczesny
  - Dresden: A. R. Penck
  - Düsseldorf: Moritz Reichelt, Jörg Immendorff, Albert Oehlen, Markus Oehlen, Martin Kippenberger, Markus Lüpertz, Werner Büttner, Horst Gläsker, Peter Angermann
  - Karlsruhe: Bernd Erich Gall
- Switzerland: Martin Disler
- Montreal, Quebec, Canada: Cesare Oliva

== Later usage ==
The term Junge Wilde began to be used by the media in the 1990s with reference to a certain group of politicians who bucked party leadership to make their names. It was first used with reference to the German CDU party (particularly against Helmut Kohl).

Since then the term has also been applied to members of other parties.
