= Erika Billeter =

German-born Swiss curator

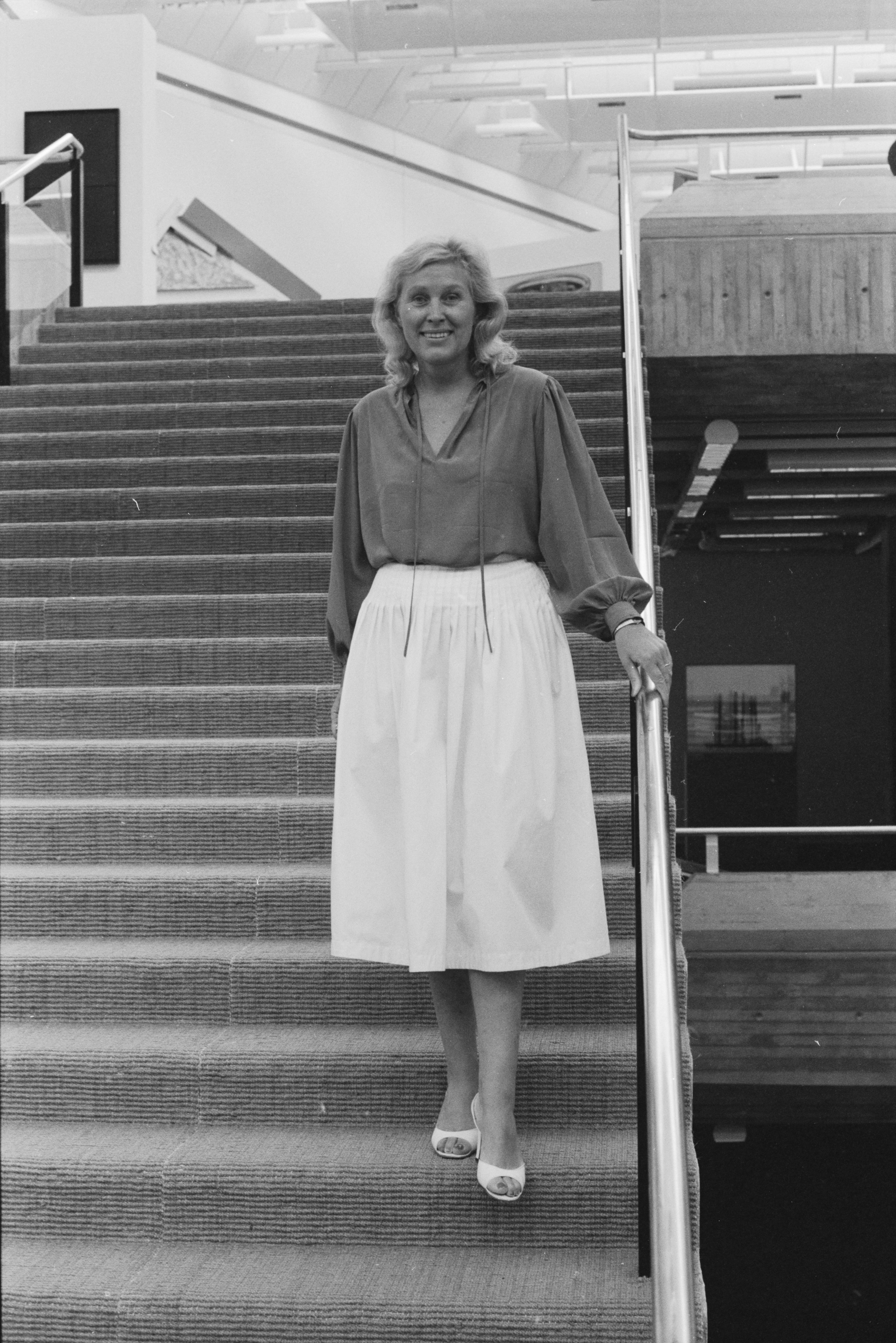
- Erika Billeter, Kunsthaus Zürich (1979)
- Born: Erika Schulze; 8 November 1927; Cologne, Germany
- Died: 12 August 2011 (aged 83); Saint-Légier-La Chiésaz, Switzerland
- Other name: Erika Gysling-Billeter
- Education: University of Cologne, University of Basel
- Occupations: Curator, art historian, writer, museum director
- Spouses: Fritz Billeter, Erich Gysling
- Awards: Bern State Prize (2000)

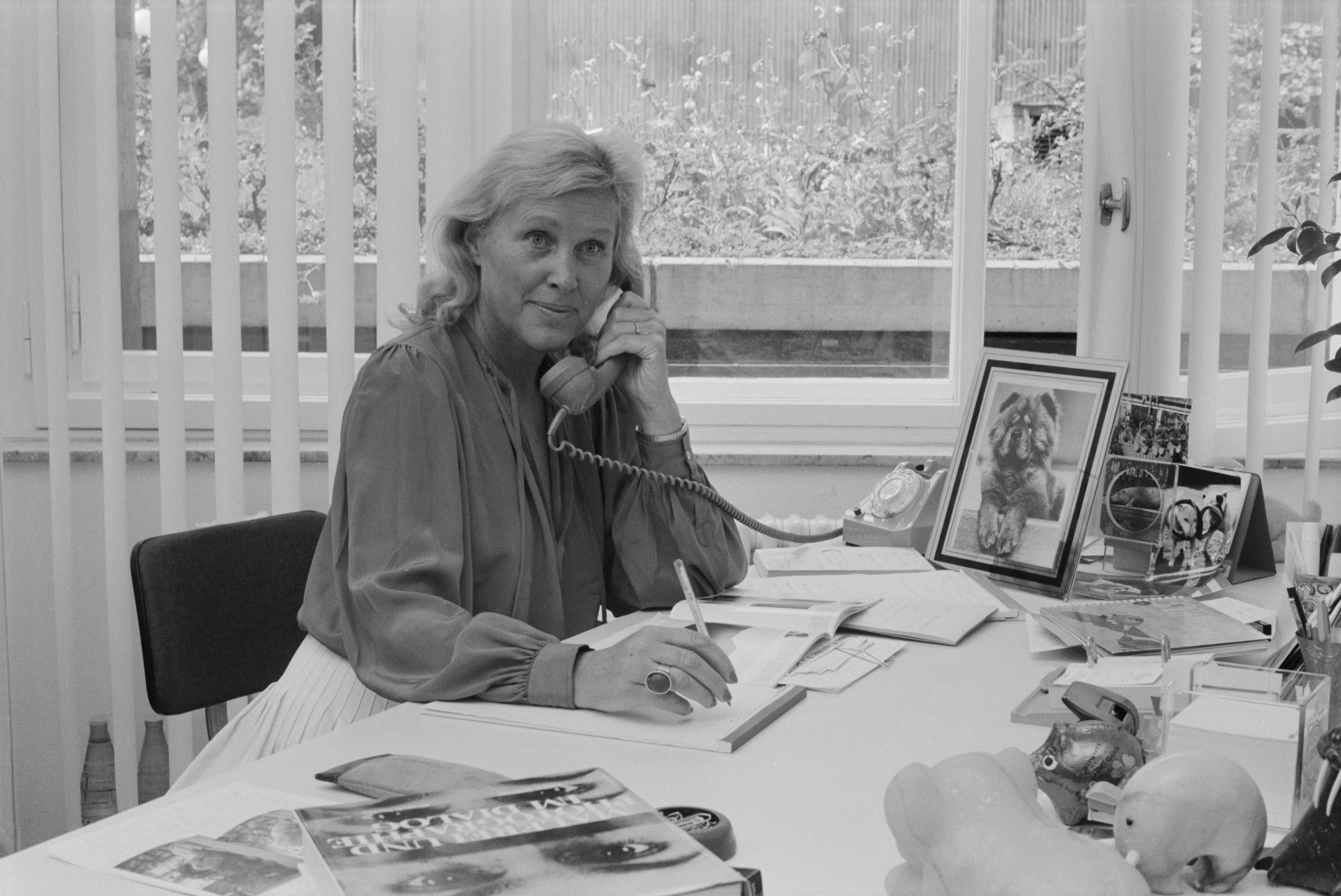
Billeter at Kunsthaus Zürich (1979)

Erika Billeter (also known as Erika Gysling-Billeter, née Erika Schulze; 8 November 1927 – 12 August 2011), was a German-born Swiss art historian, curator, writer, and museum director. She was a prolific author and specialized in writing and editing art exhibition catalogues (in German and English languages). She was also known for her interests in Latin American art history.

== Biography ==
Erika Billeter was born in 1927 in Cologne, North Rhine-Westphalia, Germany. She attended the University of Cologne to study art history, followed by study at the University of Basel where she graduated with a PhD in 1960. She had emigrated to Switzerland in 1962, after marrying scholar Fritz Billeter. Her second marriage was to journalist Erich Gysling.

She served as a curator at the Kunstgewerbemuseum der Stadt Zürich (later known as the Museum of Design, Zürich) from 1962 until 1968; curator at the Museum Bellerive in Zürich from 1968 to 1974; and deputy director of Kunsthaus Zürich from 1975 to 1981; then director at the Cantonal Museum of Fine Arts (Musée Cantonal des Beaux-Arts) from 1981 to 1991. While working at the Cantonal Museum of Fine Arts, Billeter focused on the display of both regional and international artists including works by Joseph Beuys, Martin Disler, Christo, Leiko Ikemura, Francesco Clemente, Eric Fischl, Rolf Iseli, among others.

In 2000, Billeter was awarded the Bern State Prize, for her work in the service of culture.

== Publications ==
Billeter published more than 1,000 works, below is a list of her select works.

=== Author ===
- Billeter, Erika (2008). Michel Sima: Ateliers d'artiste (in French). Michel Sima (artist). Editions Snoeck. ISBN 978-9053496770.
- Billeter, Erika (2002). Viva la Vida. Kuba - eine Begegnung in Bildern [Viva la Vida. Cuba - An Encounter in Pictures by Erika Billeter] (in German). Bern, Switzerland: Benteli. ISBN 3716512451.
- Billeter, Erika (1986). Luciano Castelli. Ein Maler träumt sich. A painter who dreams himself (in German). Luciano Castelli (artist). Bern, Switzerland: Benteli. ISBN 978-3716505410.
- Billeter, Erika (1964). "Zum Einfluß der Graphik von Dürer und Holbein in der französischen Kunst des 16. Jahrhunderts" [On the Influence of Dürer's and Holbein's Graphics on French Art of the 16th Century]. Basler Zeitschrift für Geschichte und Altertumskunde (dissertation) (in German). 62, 63: 40–73.

=== Editor ===
- Billeter, Erika, ed. (1994). Fiesta und Ritual: Graciela Iturbides Mexiko [Fiesta and Ritual: Graciela Iturbides Mexico] (in German). Graciela Iturbide (artist). Bern, Switzerland: Benteli. ISBN 9783716509357.
- Billeter, Erika, ed. (1994). The World of Frida Kahlo: The Blue House (art exhibition). Systems Design and Implementation. Houston Museum of Fine Arts, Schirn Kunsthalle Frankfurt. Museum of Fine Arts Houston. ISBN 978-0295973289.
- Billeter, Erika, ed. (1987). Images of Mexico: The Contribution of Mexico to 20th Century Art (art exhibition). Schirn Kunsthalle, Frankfurt; Dallas Museum of Art. Bern, Switzerland: Benteli.

== See also ==
- Women in the art history field
