= Karl Horst Hödicke =

German painter (1938–2024)

- Born: 21 February 1938; Nuremberg, Gau Franconia, Germany
- Died: 8 February 2024 (aged 85); Berlin, Germany
- Education: Berlin University of the Arts
- Occupation: Painter

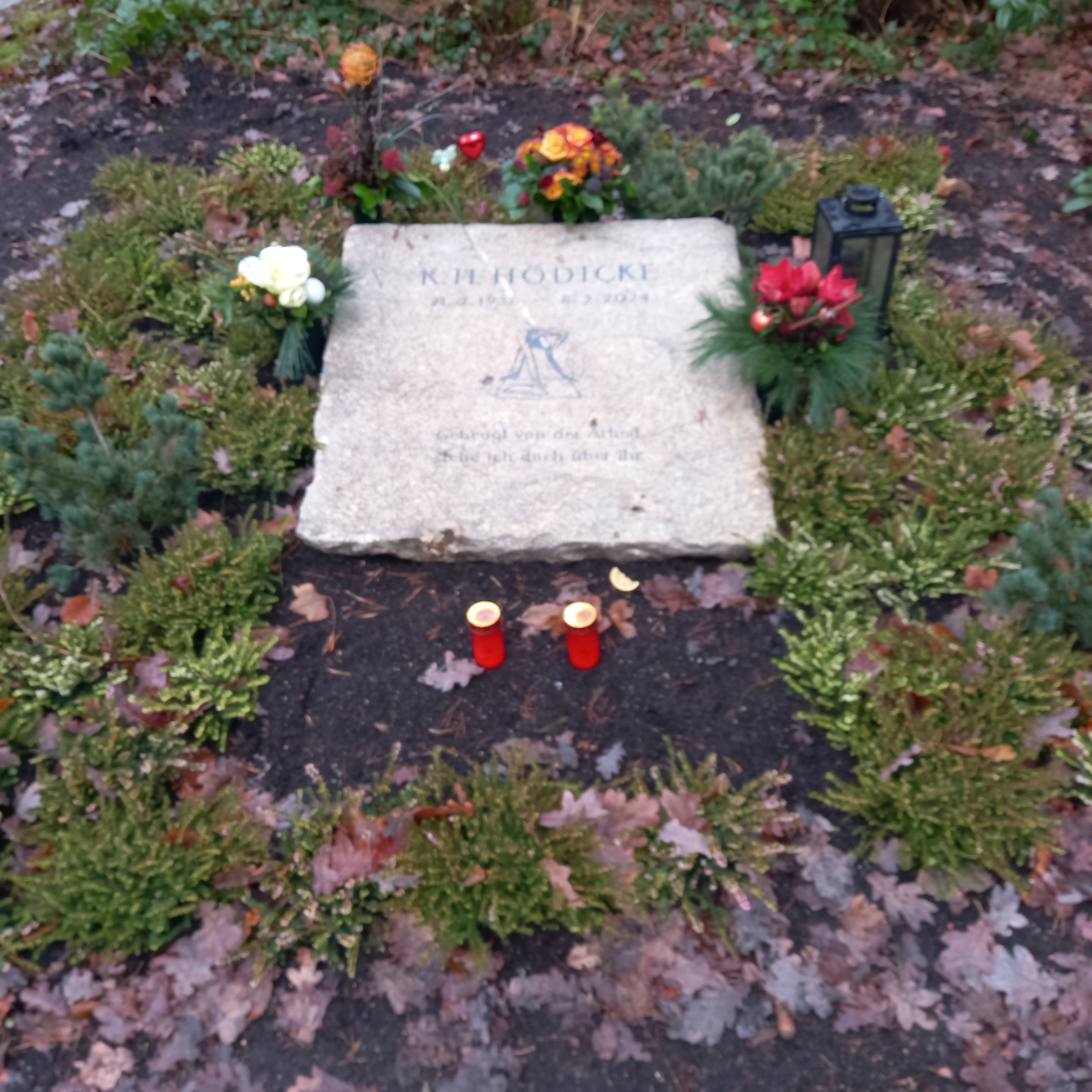

Karl Horst Hödicke (21 February 1938 – 8 February 2024) was a German painter.

== Biography ==
Born in Nuremberg on 21 February 1938, Hödicke's family moved to Vienna in 1945 and to Berlin in 1957. He studied underneath Fred Thieler at the Berlin University of the Arts and took on an expressionist style. In 1961, he joined the art group "Vision" and co-founded Grossgörschen 35, a cooperative of artists which rejected abstract art. He spent a year in New York City before receiving a scholarship to the Villa Massimo in Rome in 1966. He then became a professor at his alma mater, notably teaching Helmut Middendorf and Rainer Fetting. In 1980, he was elected a member of the Academy of Arts, Berlin.

Hödicke died in Berlin on 8 February 2024, at the age of 85.

== Expositions ==
- Grossgörchen 35, Berlin (1964)
- Centre for Fine Arts, Brussels (1984)
- Artcurial, Paris (1991)
