= Willy Brandts Park =

Urban park in Stockholm, Sweden

Coordinates: 59°17′42.78″N 18°6′25.58″E

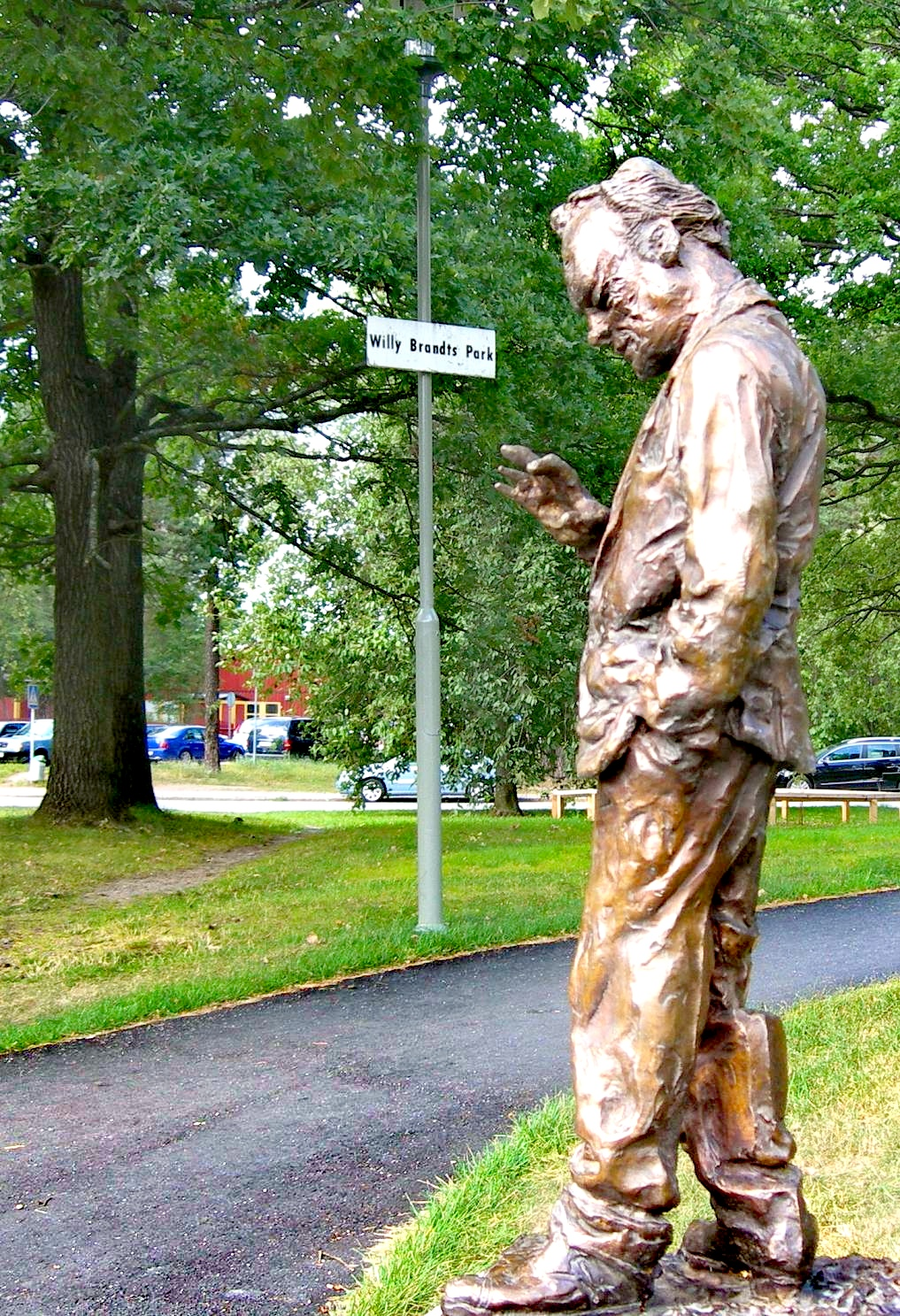
Statue of Willy Brandt in the park, 2007.

Willy Brandts Park is a small park in Hammarbyhöjden, Stockholm. It is named after former German Chancellor Willy Brandt, who lived in the area in the 1940s during his exile from Nazi Germany. The park got its current name in 1997. A sculpture by German artist Rainer Fetting depicting Willy Brandt has been erected in the park and was unveiled on June 14, 2007.
