= Bernd Erich Gall =

German artist

Bernd Erich Gall (born August 2, 1956) is a German painter and conceptual artist.

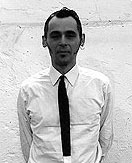
Bernd Erich Gall, 1995

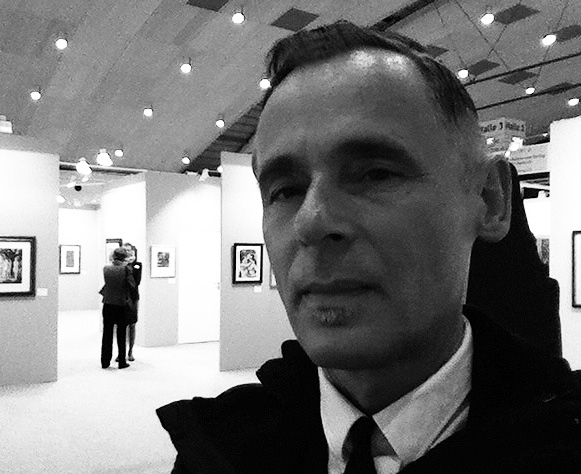
Bernd Erich Gall, 2015

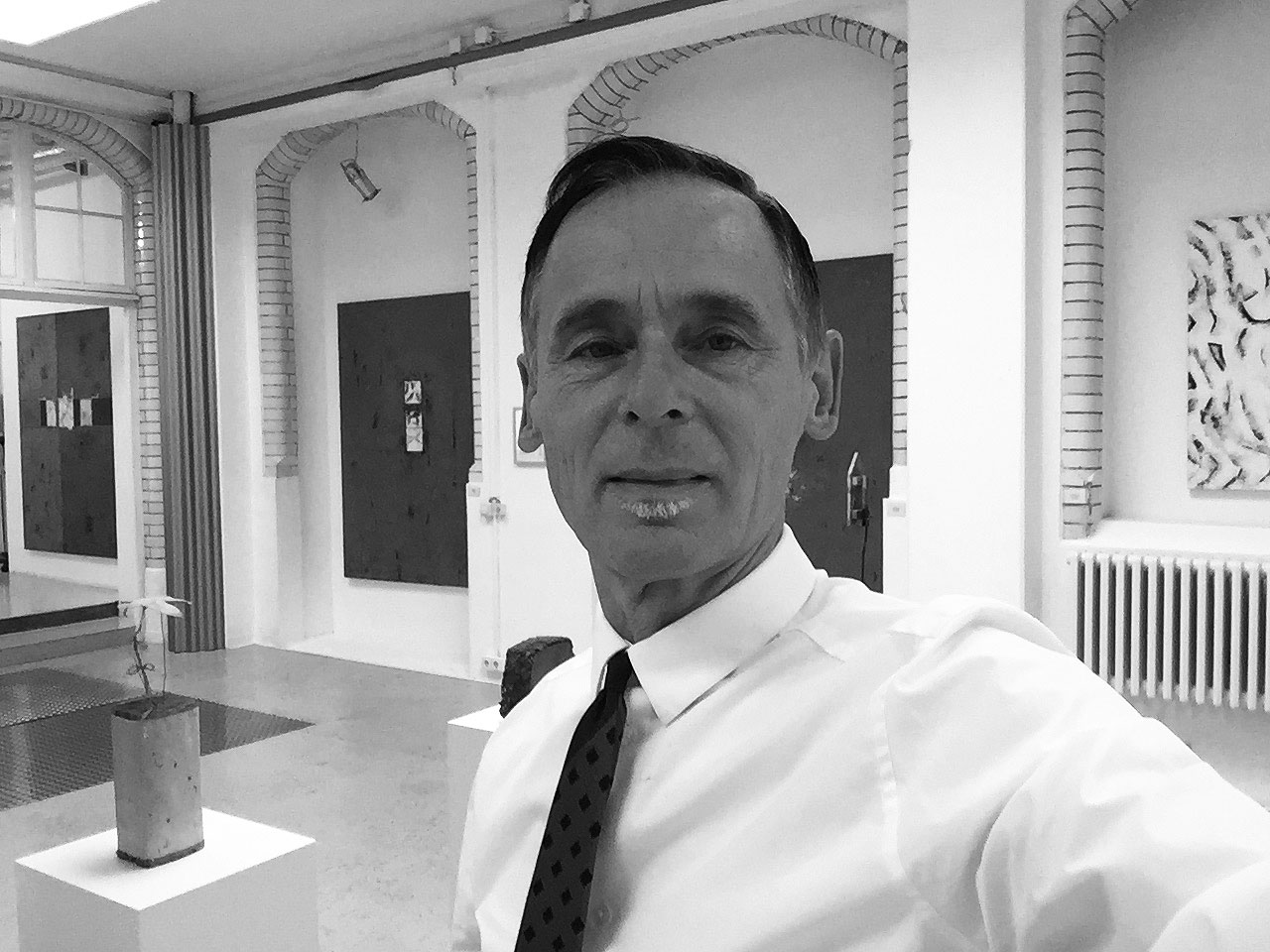
Bernd Erich Gall in his studio, 2017, Pforzheim, Germany

In the early 1980s he was a representative of the "Neue Wilde", a group of German artists. In the 1990s it came to a stylistic radical change. The crude, strong, expressive figuration was replaced by a compositional color abstraction. Clear, strong color fields generated the basic formula of Gall’s paintings and built a distance to symbolize his art work. Objects and installations enlarged his artistic spectrum.

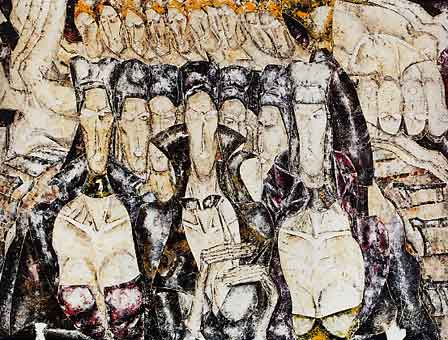
Trite Theatre Trippers, 1994 · Oil on canvas · 78 x 55 inch

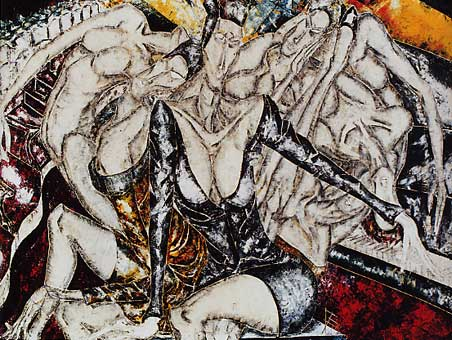
In Concert, 1994 · Oil on canvas · 78 x 55 inch

== Current art work ==
Bernd Erich Gall lives and works in Karlsruhe, Germany. His large sized actual works are geometrical "color field paintings" (oil on canvas). Gall’s conceptual modus operandi comes to the fore by his objects, installations, new media and video art.

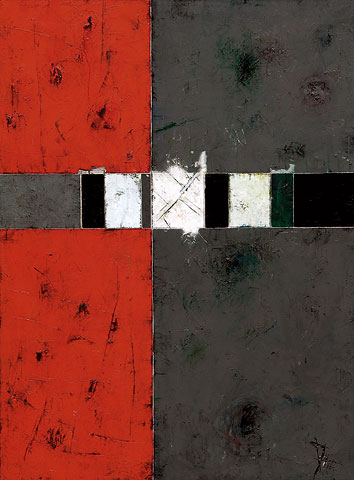
Canvas 500112 GreyOrange, 2005 · Oil on canvas · 78 x 55 inch

== Bibliography ==
Catalog

- Gall, Bernd Erich: Town House Motel. Catalog, 62 p., 2018.
- Gall, Bernd Erich: She came here to seek shelter from biting winter winds. Catalog, Objects, 62 p., 2015.
- Gall, Bernd Erich: Tagebuch eines Idioten. Catalog, 72 p., 2013.
- Gall, Bernd Erich: Empty Rooms. Catalog, 62 p., 2013.
- Gall, Bernd Erich: Wand. Catalog, 50 p., 2012.
- Gall, Bernd Erich: Playground. Catalog, 46 p., KA 2005.
- Zuehlke, Susanne; De Temple, Christoph; Gall, Bernd Erich: Synergetisch. Catalog, 26 p., Karlsruhe 2001.
- Gall, Bernd Erich: The End Of The Iron Age. Catalog, 40 p., LA 2000.
- Gall, Bernd Erich: Take Roses. Catalog, 40 p., LA 1997.
- Gall, Bernd Erich: WO-MEN II. Catalog, 42 p., LA 1995.
- Gall, Bernd Erich: wo-man. Catalog, 34 p., LA 1993.

Art-magazine

- der infant, journal of contemporary art.

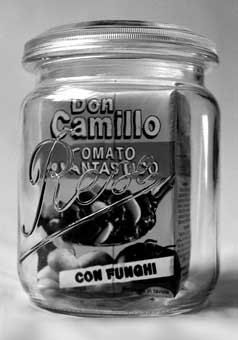
Memory Is An Elephant, 1999 · Object

- 97/1: Take Roses · They said it made the job more dangerous.
- 98/1: 8 till late shop · TV-Welten als Surrogat konsumtiver Daseins/Datenverluste.
- 99/1: Assiduity In The Bee-House.
- 99/2: Okzidentierung · Die Sonnenuntergangsrichtung als Lebensform (Dietmar Kamper).
- 01/1: Discovery Channel · Click Here To Disappear Completely.

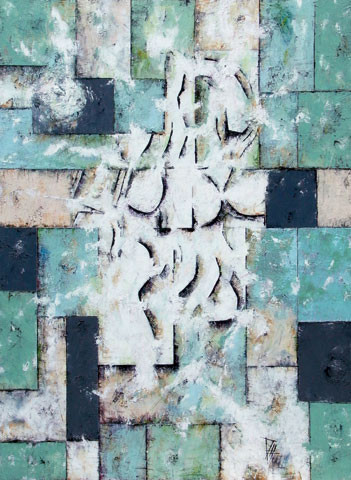
Canvas 50613 Capri, 2005 · Oil on canvas · 78 x 55 inch

Essay

- Gall, Bernd Erich: Discovery Channel - Click Here To Disappear Completely. Essay, dada-schriftenreihe, 12 p., 2001.
- Gall, Bernd Erich: Zur Dialektik meiner Leinwandarbeiten. Katalog Take Roses, LA 1998.
- Gall, Bernd Erich: 8 Till Late Shop · How to come into being. Der Infant 98/1, dada-Schriftenreihe, Pforzheim 1998.
- Gall, Bernd Erich: Take Roses. Der Infant 97/1, Pforzheim 1997.
- Wesner, Rudolf: Wahrhaftigkeit des Spontanen - Zu den Leinwandarbeiten Bernd Erich Galls. Der Infant 97/1, Pforzheim 1997.
- Littmann, Franz: Entrückung - Das Fremde oder vom Scheitern der Vernunft. Catalog WO-MEN II, LA 1995.
- Rein, Ulrike: Frauenbilder - Eine kunstgeschichtliche Erinnerung. Catalog WO-MEN II, LA 1995.
- Wellhöner, Frank: Basic Instinct - Von der archetypischen Befindlichkeit im künstlerischen Kosmos. Catalog WO-MEN II, LA 1995.
- Gall, Bernd Erich: Flimmernde Sequenzen. Catalog WO-MEN II, LA 1995.

Other

- beg56: tripdown. Audio-CD, 10 paintings, OJ 101010, 2010.
- beg56: funkyjob. Audio-CD, 9 paintings, OJ 070131, 2007.
- beg56: homeless. Audio-CD, 9 paintings 4 homeless, OJ 050912, 2004.

== Paintings ==
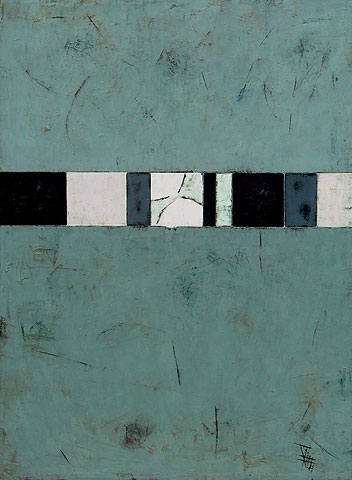
Canvas 050107 Grey · Oil on canvas · 78 x 55 inch

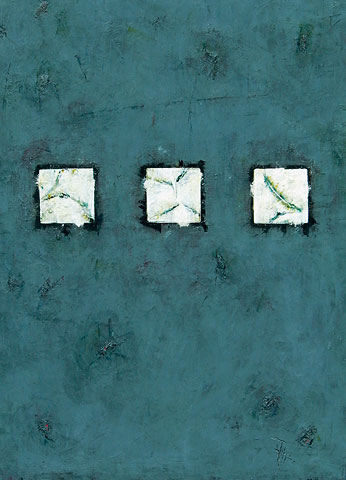
Canvas 041025 Grey, 2004 · Oil on canvas · 78 x 55 inch

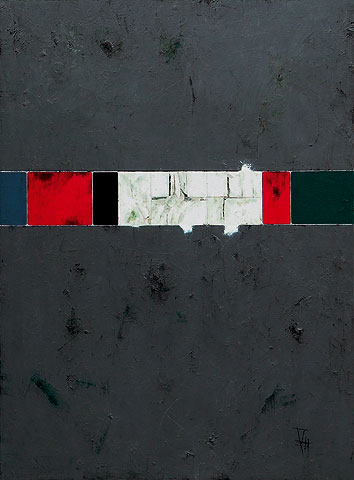
Canvas 50525 Grey, 2005 · Oil on canvas · 78 x 55 inch

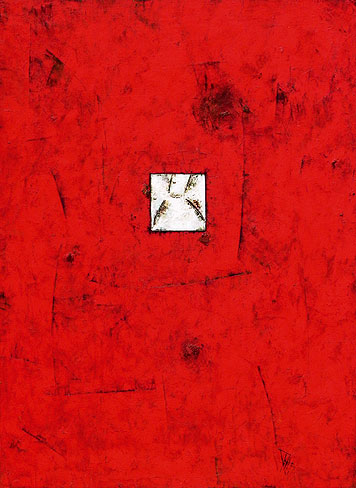
Canvas 040910 Crimson, 2004 · Oil on canvas · 78 x 55 inch

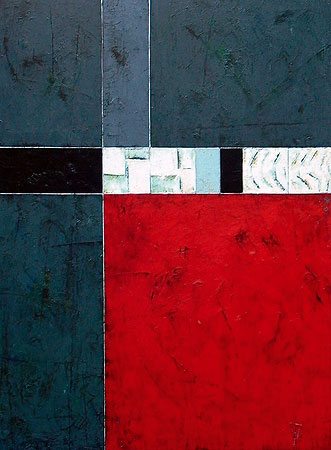
Wand 070920, 2007 · Oil on canvas · 78 x 55 inch

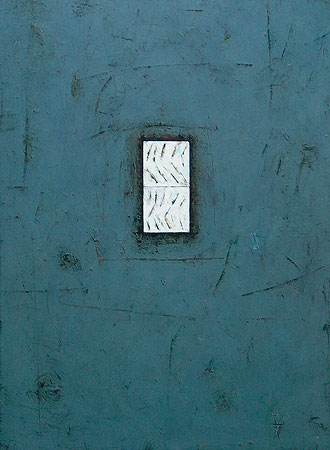
Wand 070911, 2007 · Oil on canvas · 78 x 55 inch

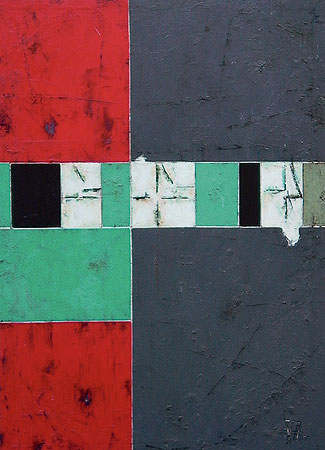
Wand 070501, 2007 · Oil on canvas · 78 x 55 inch

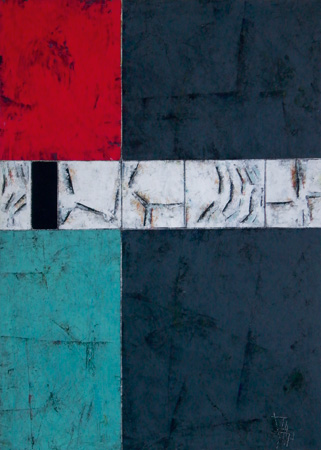
Wand 0060928, 2006 · Oil on canvas · 78 x 55 inch

== Objects ==
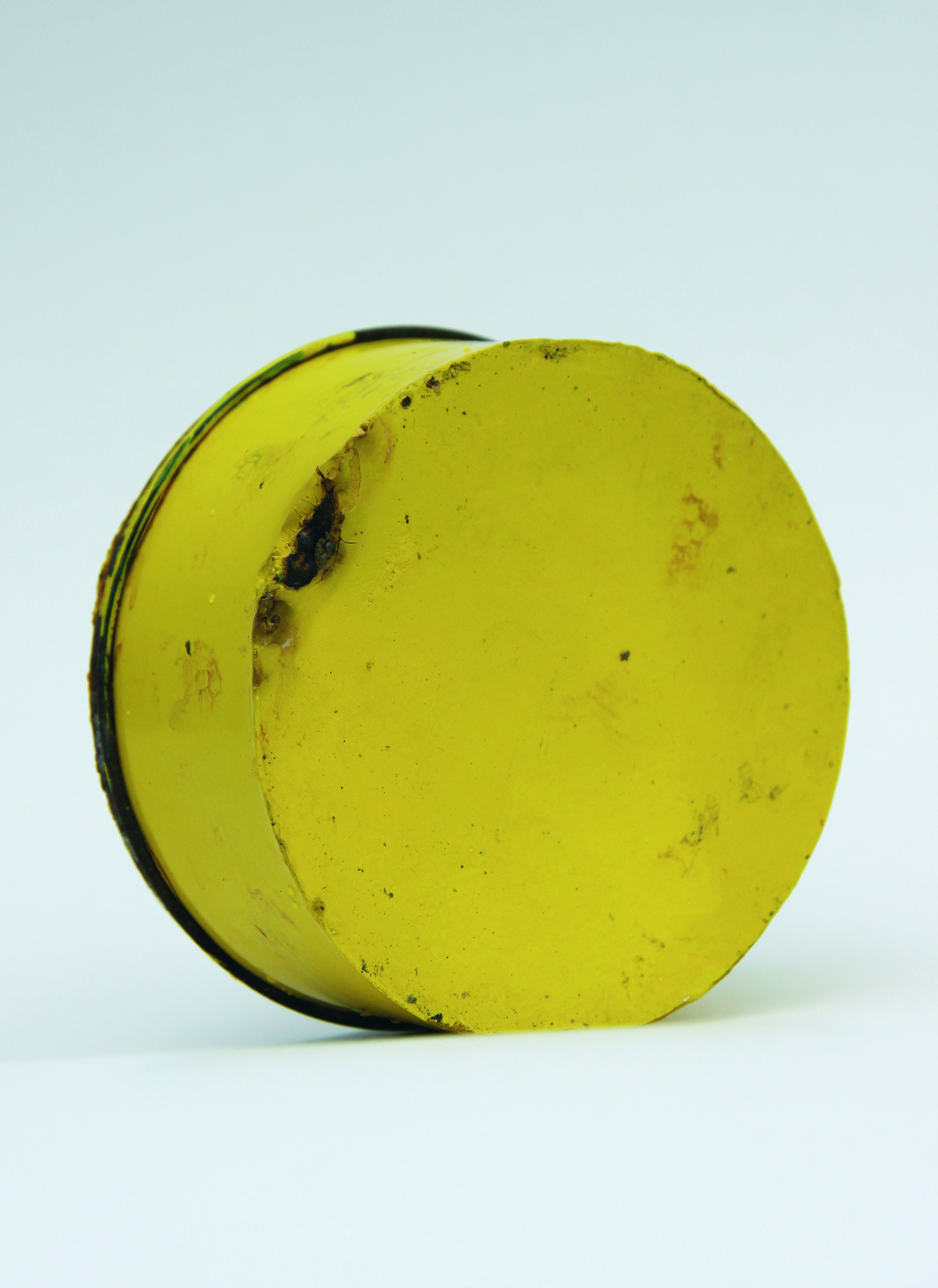
Synchron 080508, 2008 · Mixed Media

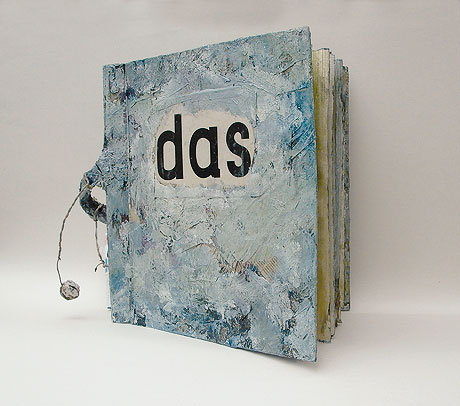
das, 2007 · Book object

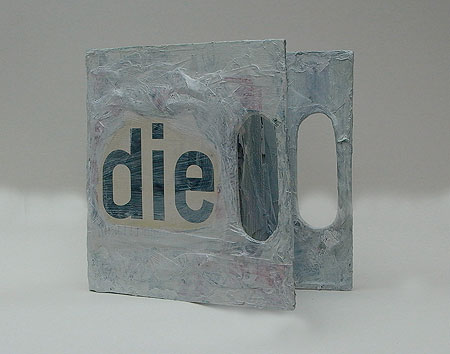
die, 2007 · Book object

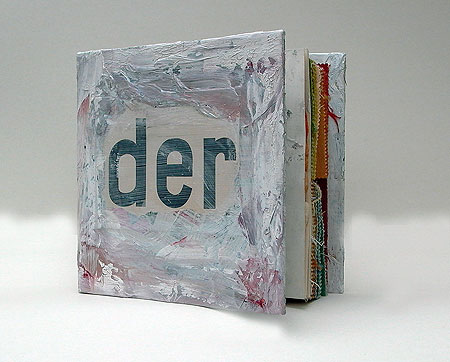
der, 2007 · Book object

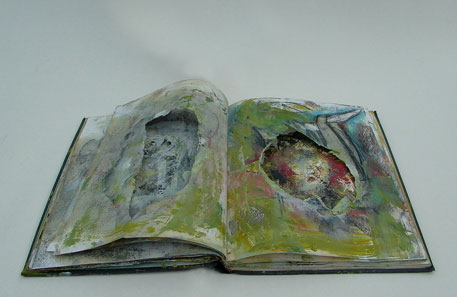
Malbuch 060312, 2006 · Colored sketch-book

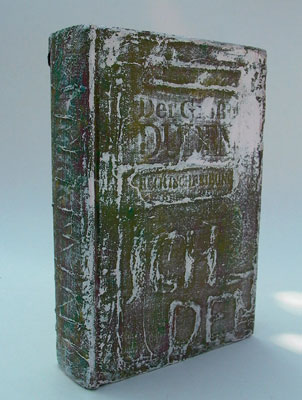
Du-den-Ich-den, 2003 · Colored book object

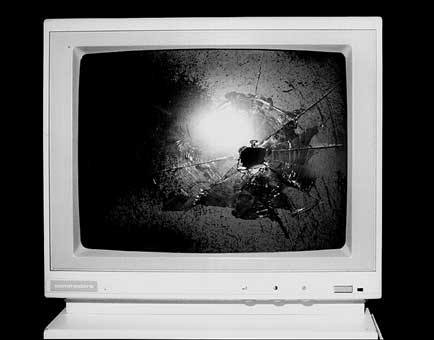
Screen With Bullet-Hole, 2002 · Found object

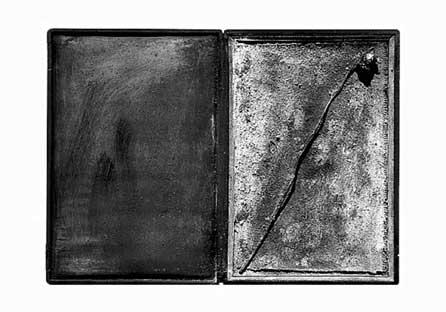
Palette-Grey 1, 1996 · Oil, Pigment on millboard

== See also ==
- List of German painters
