= Horst Gläsker =

German artist

Horst Gläsker (born 21 March 1949) is a German artist. His work is a symbiosis of music, dance, theatre, drawing, painting, sculpture, installation and architecture.

== Development ==
From 1963 to 1966 Horst Gläsker did an apprenticeship as a showcase designer and in the following years up to 1968 he worked as poster artist. From 1970 to 1973 he visited a course of lectures and did the university-entrance diploma. Parallel to this he was active as a musician. During the 60s he and his 4 brothers were in a dance combo and in the 70s he was involved with diverse Kraut-rock groups of the era. At the end of the 70s he began to build sound sculptures and to make music performances. From 1973 to 1979 he studied at the Kunstakademie Düsseldorf, with Lambert Maria Wintersberger, Gerhard Richter and Karl Otto Götz. 1975 he lived 1 year in a mountain shelter in the Toscana where he painted landscapes and portraits and grappled intensely with the effect of colours. After that he developed a painture out of his colour palettes, collected old Persian carpets from the rubbish and painted psychedelic colour patterns on its ornaments which had the consequence, that Gerhard Richter expelled him from his class. After that Gläsker worked alone in an abandoned room, belonging to the suspended professor Joseph Beuys, who had been dismissed without notice by Johannes Rau, the minister of science at that time, because he indiscriminately admitted all people who applied to the academy. Later Gläsker became master student of Karl Otto Götz (professor of Sigmar Polke, Franz Erhard Walther and others).

== Work ==
Art scientists have linked Horst Gläsker with the category “Individual Mythology” coined by Harald Szeemann or grouped him with the “Junge Wilde” ("wild youth"). The closest definition of his art is perhaps the idea of the “Gesamtkunstwerk”. Harald Falckenberg (see: Collection Falckenberg), the Hamburger art collector, businessman, lawyer and art theorist, described him as ”bird of paradise and holy fool” and saw him in a reference to the newer development of the “pictorial turn” and the ancient tradition of the grotesque. Besides the relation of his art to music, there is the connection with architecture. This began in the 80s with space filling painting on wallpapers, self built and repainted architectural pieces, and space frame works like columns, candelabra, cupolas, and pavilions etc. Following on from that there were numerous “art in architecture” applications and projects, for example murals, mosaics, fountains and floor designs. The art theorist and curator Manfred Schneckenburger named Gläsker, in relation to his carpet and wallpaper paintings, the European founder of the Pattern Art and wrote that he developed his own particular new, idea of the ornament, “as if the hard verdict of Adolf Loos “ornament is a crime” had never existed".

== Life ==
Gläsker was born in Herford, Germany. He lives and works in Düsseldorf, Germany. He has an artist family. He works organizationally and artistically together with his wife Margret Masuch-Gläsker. Their two common children are Louis Gläsker (artist, musician, writer, and filmmaker) and Cecilia Gläsker (filmmaker, camerawoman and photographer).

== Teachings ==
- 1983-1984: visiting professorship at the Kunstakademie Münster, Germany
- 1988–1991: visiting professorship at the Kunstakademie Münster, Germany
- 1995–1997: visiting professorship at the Hochschule für Bildende Künste Braunschweig, Germany
- 1998–2004: professorship at the Kunsthochschule Kassel, Germany
- 2006: Guest lecturer at the Savannah College of Art and Design, Georgia, US

== Individual exhibitions (selection) ==
- 1980: Galerie Löhrl, Mönchengladbach
- 1981: Kunst- und Museumsverein Wuppertal / Von der Heydt-Museum
- 1981: Neue Galerie-Sammlung Ludwig, Aachen
- 1990: Gustav-Lübcke-Museum, Hamm
- 1998: Kunstmuseum Düsseldorf
- 2003: Galerie Hans Mayer, Düsseldorf
- 2005: St. Petri Lübeck

== Joint exhibitions (selection) ==
- 1980: Les nouveaux Fauves-Die neuen Wilden, Neue Galerie-Sammlung Ludwig, Aachen
- 1980: XI. Biennale de la Jeunesse, Musée d'Art moderne, Paris
- 1981: Bildwechsel (Change of Picture), Akademie der Künste, Berlin
- 1983: Montevideo Diagonale, Antwerpen
- 1985: Märchen, Mythen, Monster (Fairy tales, Myths, Monsters), Neue Galerie Graz und Rheinisches Landesmuseum, Bonn
- 1986: Bonnefantenmuseum, Maastricht
- 1994: Paper Art, International Biennial of Paper Art, Leopold-Hoesch-Museum, Düren
- 1998: Glut (Ardour), Kunsthalle Düsseldorf
- 2004: ARTKlyazma, International festival of contemporary art, Moskau
- 2007: Tatort Paderborn, Irdische Macht – Himmlische Mächte (Crime Scene Paderborn, Earthly Power - Heavenly Powers)

== Public commissions - Art in Architecture (selection) ==
- 1988: Wall and fountain mosaic, Landeszentralbank, Frankfurt / M.
- 1988: Mural, AID-Gebäude, Bonn
- 1990: Tower of the Four Elements and murals, im Posttechnischen Zentralamt, Darmstadt
- 1998: Two church rooms, JVA Gelsenkirchen
- 1999: Mural and column painting, Paracelsus-Klinik Marl
- 2008: Scala, Holsteiner Treppe, Wuppertal
- 2008: Cross and World Mirror, Sankt Martin Kirche, Langenfeld

== Performances and concerts with Sound Sculptures (selection) ==
Pedal-Organ-Carpet-Concerts

- 1980: XI Biennale de Paris, Musée d'Art modern de la Ville de Paris
- 1980: Von der Heydt-Museum, Wuppertal
- 1981: Neuen Galerie-Sammlung Ludwig, Aachen

Table Concerts

- 1987: Kunstmuseum Chur, Schweiz
- 2004: Louisiana-Museum, Humlebaek, Dänemark
- 2004: ARTKliazma, International festival of contemporary art, Moskau
- 2005: Langen-Foundation, Raketenstation - Insel Hombroich, Neuss

Living Pictures

- 1991: Der Tanz des Schüttelgeistes und die Verführung des Ton (The Dance of the Shivering Spirit and the Enticement of Tone), Düsseldorfer Schauspielhaus
- 1992: Gesang der vier Elemente (Song of the Four Elements), Kunsthalle Recklinghausen, Ruhrfestspiele
- 1993: Der Gesang der vier Elemente und die Verführung des Lichts (The Song of the Four Elements and the Enticement of Light), MEDIALE, Deichtorhalle, Kammerspiel, Hamburg and Städtisches Gustav-Lübcke-Museum, Hamm and ARENA DI SKALA, Lindinger und Schmid, Regensburg

== See also ==
- List of German painters
