= Markus Raetz =

Swiss artist (1941–2020)

- Born: June 6, 1941; Bern, Switzerland
- Died: April 14, 2020 (aged 78); Bern, Switzerland
- Known for: Sculpture

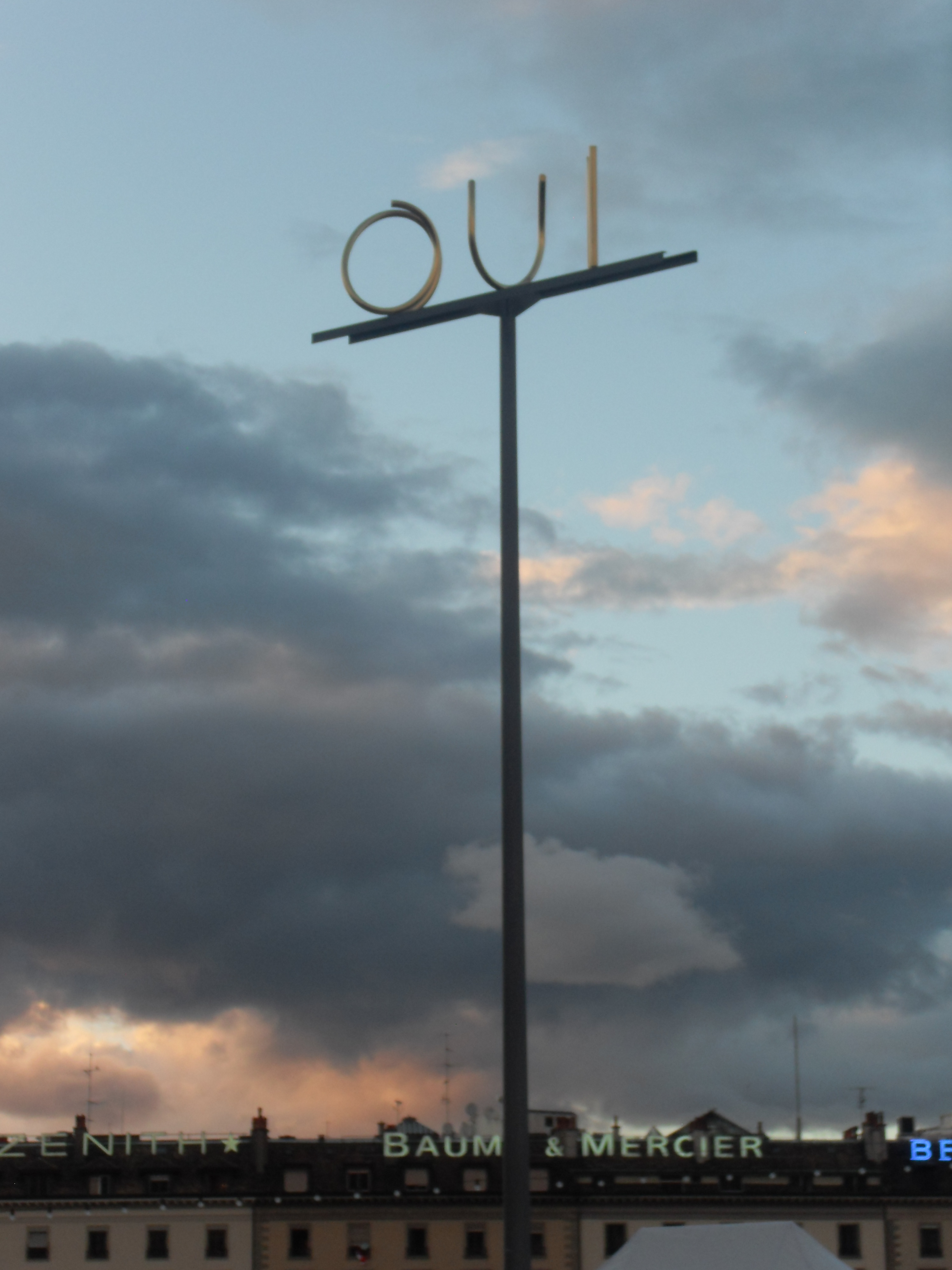
One of Raetz's sculptures in Geneva, seen as "oui" ("yes") from one angle...

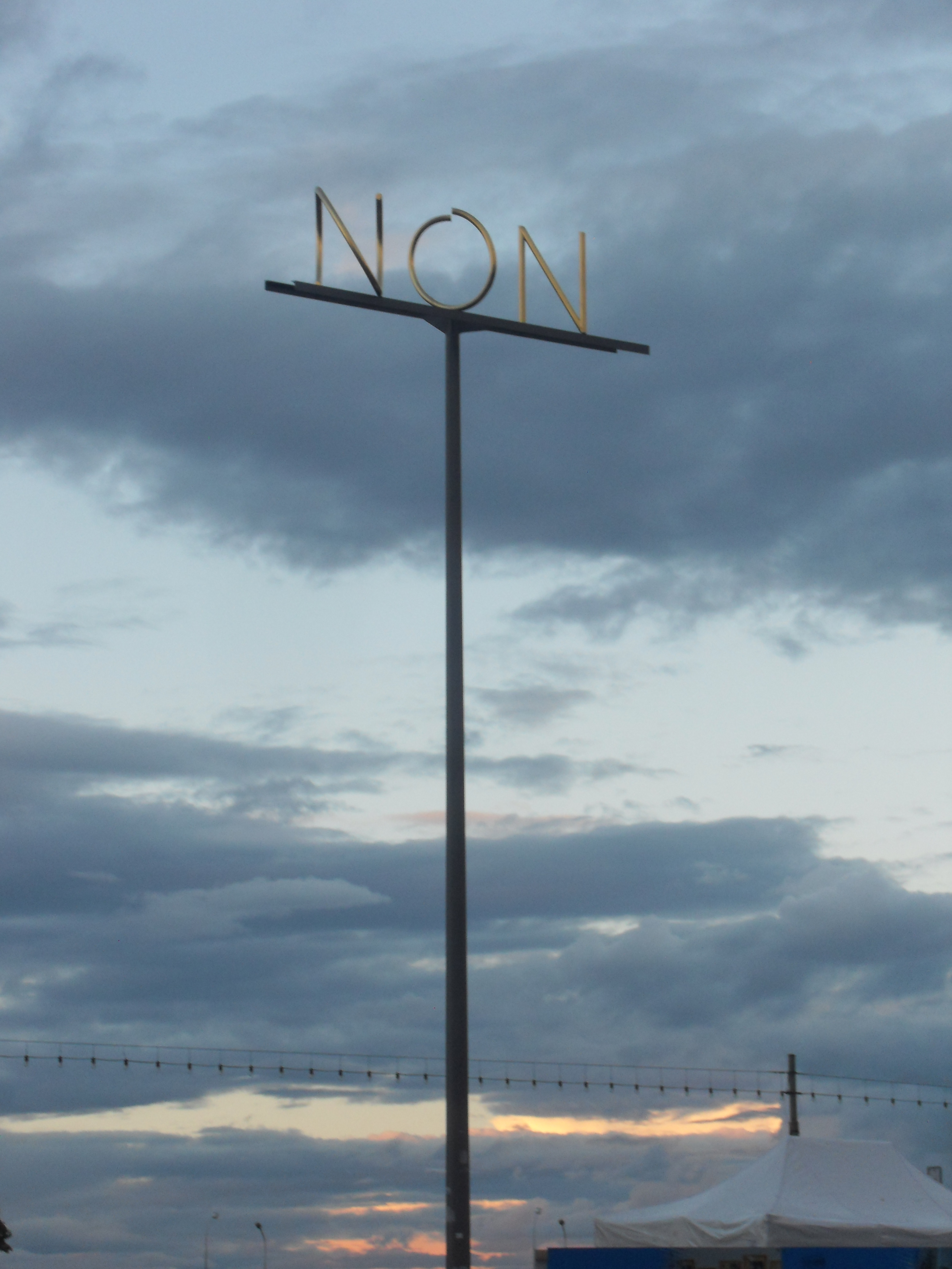
... and "non" ("no") from another.

Markus Raetz (6 June 1941 – 14 April 2020) was a Swiss painter, sculptor, and illustrator.

== Life and work ==
Born in Bern and raised in Büren an der Aare near Bern, Raetz obtained a teacher's education and taught primary school until 1963, when he embarked on an artist's career with stays in Bern, Amsterdam, Carona (Swiss canton of Ticino) and Berlin. He married Monika Müller in 1970, and had a daughter with her, Aimée.

Beginning in the 1960s, Raetz created numerous works, including more than 30,000 drawings. Raetz lived and worked in the village of Carona (Ticino / Italian part of Switzerland) together with many other artists who lived and worked there at the same time, such as Peter Schweri. His work focused on drawings and paintings in the 1960s and 1970s, and continued with sculptures in the 1980s and 1990s, beginning with the sculpture Der Kopf in the Merian Park in Basel (1984). The principal topic of his work is the nature of perception. His works do not focus on what they portray, but on how they are perceived. They often require interaction by the viewer, and can be understood only when viewed in motion or from different angles.

Raetz exhibited works at numerous international exhibitions, including at documenta 4, 5 and 7. Works by him are held by public collections including the Museum of Modern Art in New York, the Schaulager in Basel, the Museum für Moderne Kunst in Frankfurt, the Kunstmuseum Basel and the Kunstmuseum Bern. He was awarded, among other recognitions, the Prix Meret Oppenheim in 2006 and the Gerhard-Altenbourg-Preis in 2004. He was represented by the gallery Farideh Cadot Associés since 1981.

Raetz died on 14 April 2020 at the age of 78.

== Bibliography ==
- Raetz, Markus; Haldemann, Anita; Kunstmuseum (2012). Markus Raetz: Ausstellung im Kunstmuseum Basel, 20.10.2012 - 17.2.2013. Ostfildern: Hatje Cantz Verlag. ISBN 9783775733847.
