= Urs Lüthi =

Swiss conceptual artist (born 1947)

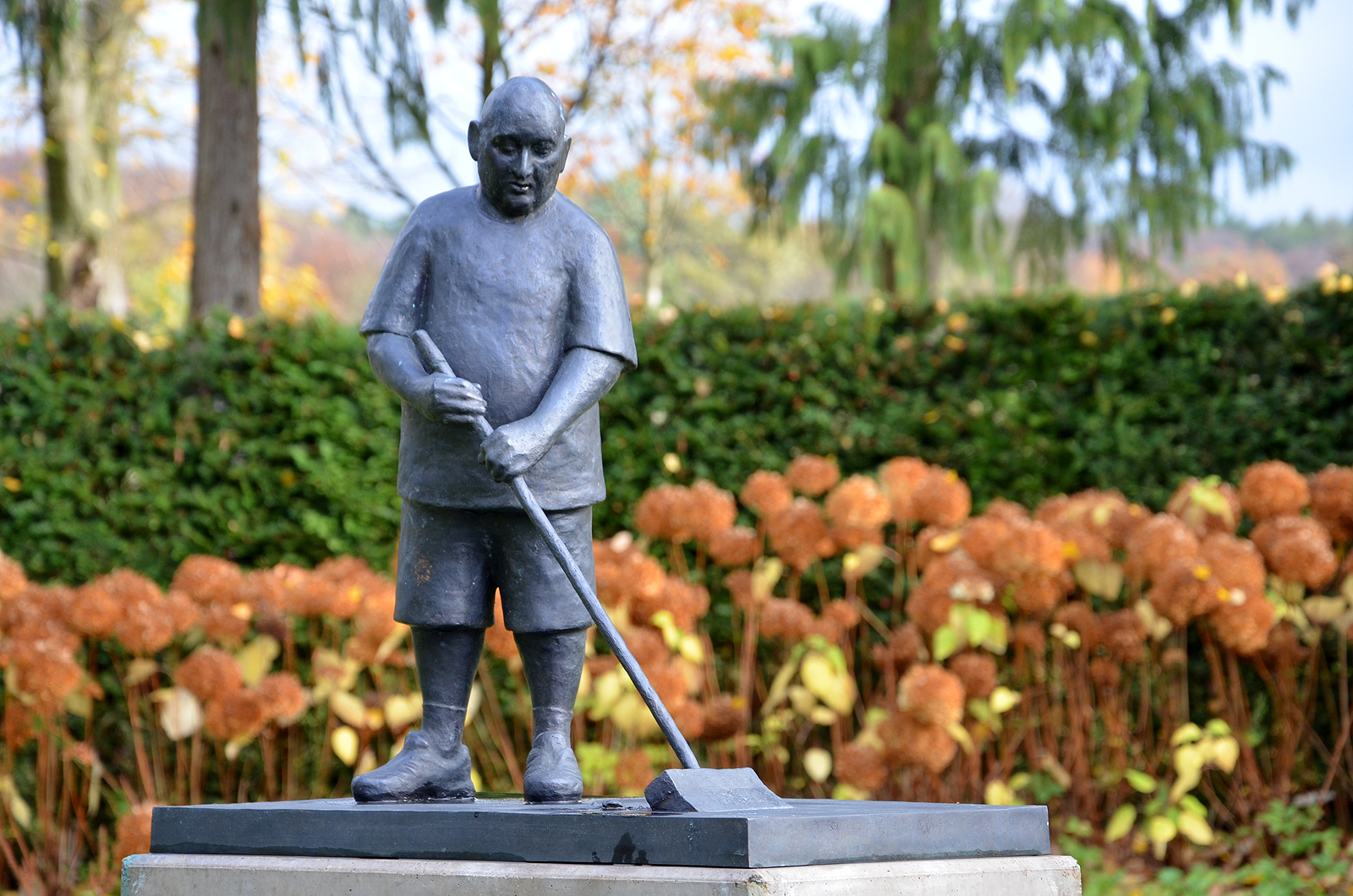
- 2010 sculpted self-portrait
- Born: 10 September 1947 (age 78); Kriens, Switzerland
- Education: School of Applied Arts, Zürich
- Known for: Photography, sculpture, performance, silk-screen, video and painting
- Website: www.ursluethi.com

Urs Lüthi (born 10 September 1947 in Kriens) is a Swiss conceptual artist who attended the School of Applied Arts in Zürich. Noted for using his body and alter ego as the subject of his artworks, he has worked in photography, sculpture, performance, silk-screen, video and painting. Since 1994, Lüthi has worked as a university professor in Kassel, Germany, and in 2009 Kassel gave Lüthi the Arnold Bode award.

Luthi and other artists of this period influenced Lou Reed. He is mentioned as an influence in Reed's Transformer album, which contains the hit drag anthem "Walk on the Wild Side". Luthi was part of a group of Continental European artists who were interested in, and "voiced, in their work, a desire for a utopian conception of androgyny, in which they would embody a unified ambisexuality or realize a perfect union with their lover."

Luthi describes the most significant aspect of their work as "ambivalence...Objectivity is not very important to me: all is objective just as all could be subjective. Therefore, one must take reality into account and actually my awareness of the real, depending on my mood, has thousands of facets."
