= Rainer Fetting =

German painter and sculptor (born 1949)

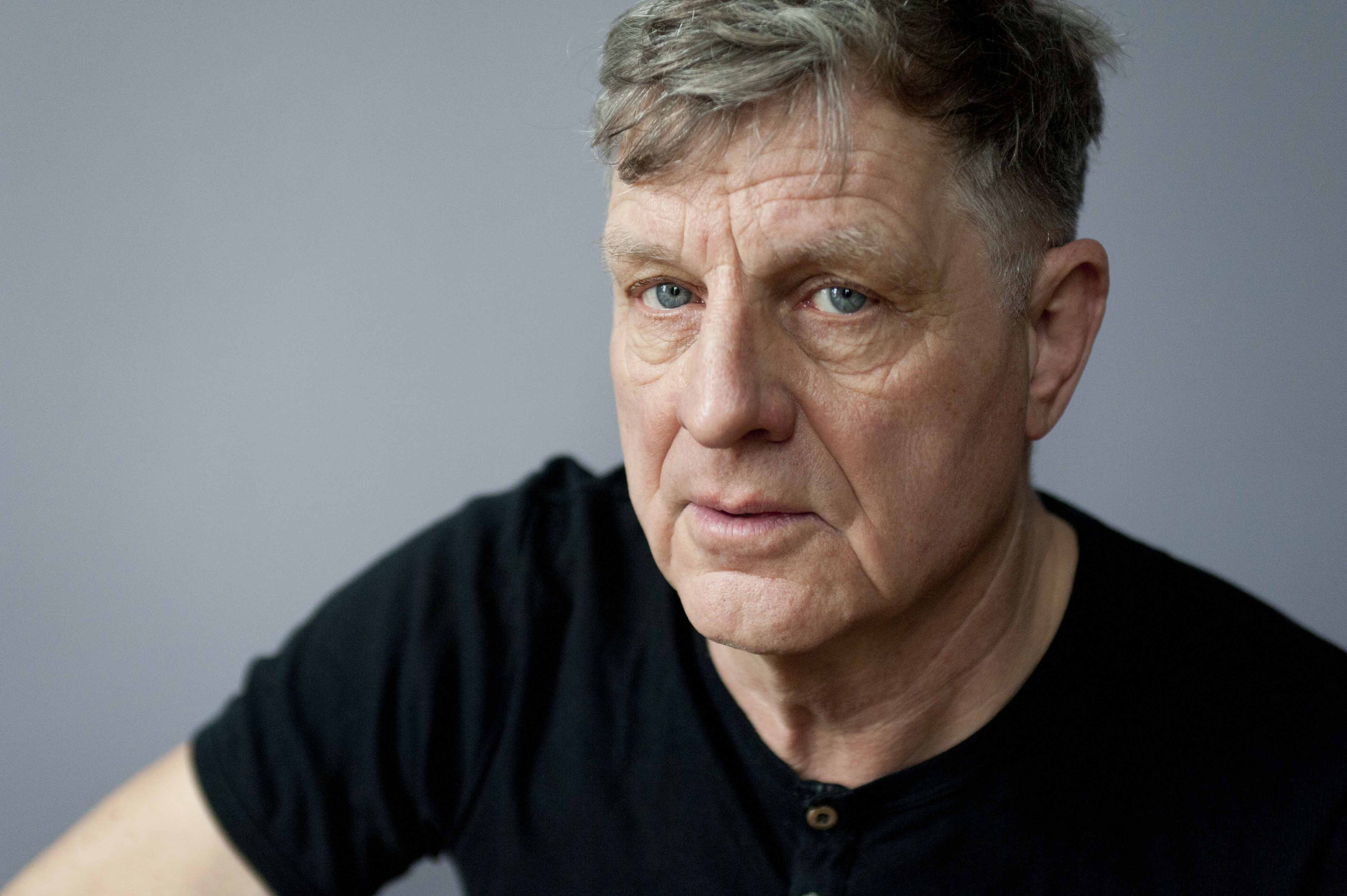
- Rainer Fetting
- Born: 31 December 1949 (age 76); Wilhelmshaven, West Germany
- Occupations: Painter and sculptor
- Website: http://www.moreeuw.com/histoire-art/biographie-rainer-fetting.htm

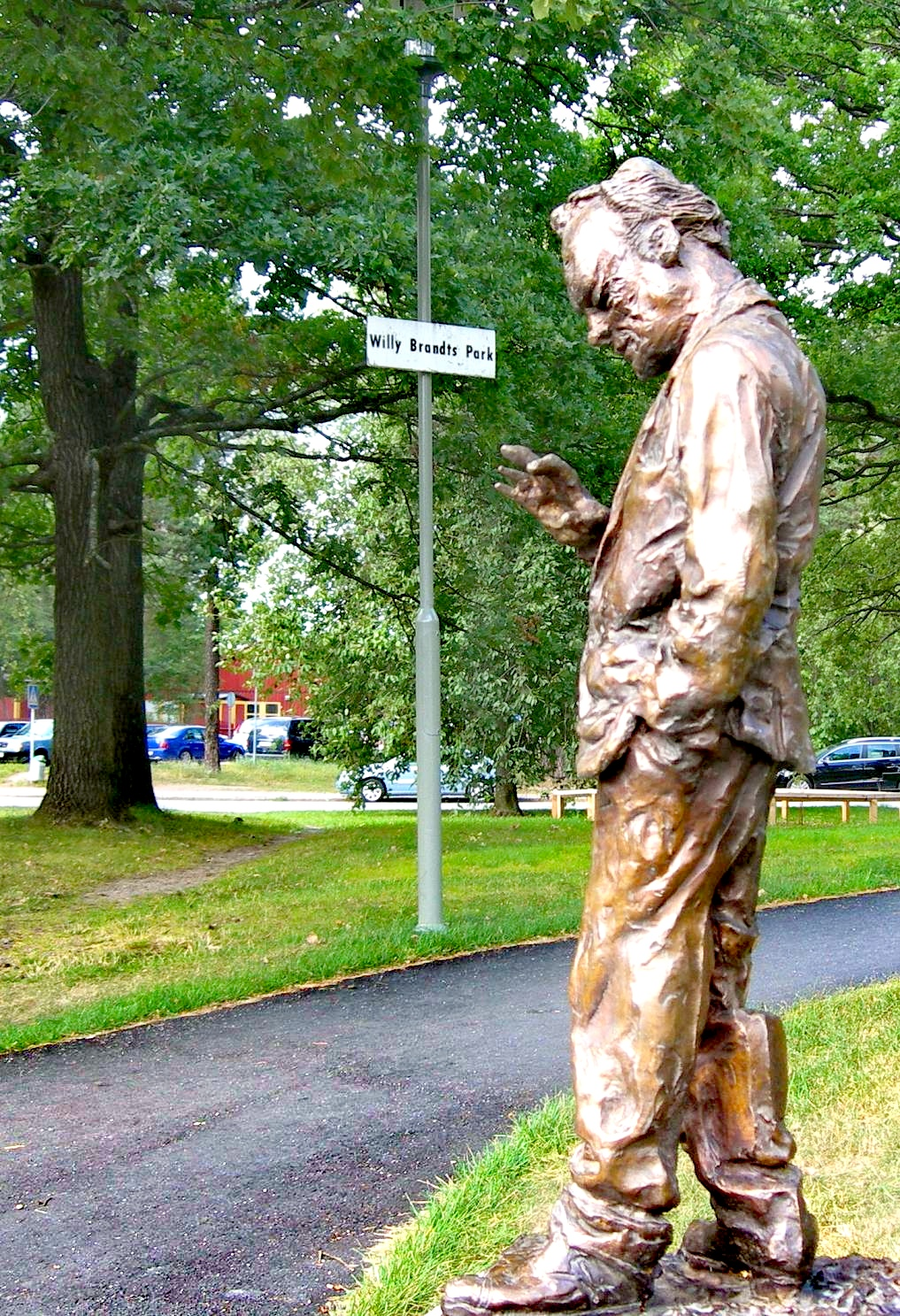
Willy Brandt in Willy Brandts Park, Stockholm, Sweden

Rainer Fetting (born 31 December 1949 in Wilhelmshaven, West Germany) is a German painter and sculptor.

Rainer Fetting was one of the co-founders and main protagonists of the Galerie am Moritzplatz in Berlin, founded in the late 1970s by a group of young artists (mainly painters) from the class of Karl Horst Hödicke at the former Berliner Hochschule für Bildende Künste (Berlin Art Academy, today known as Universität der Künste). This group of artists, known as the “Moritzboys” and including, among others, Salomé, Bernd Zimmer, and Helmut Middendorf, subsequently achieved international acclaim as the “Junge Wilde” or “Neue Wilde” in the early 1980s. Fetting is now one of the internationally best known contemporary German artists, having created a large oeuvre of expressive figurative paintings covering many different kinds of subject-matter, as well as many bronze sculptures.

He is openly gay and the subject of homosexuality appears in several of his paintings.

== Biography ==
Rainer Fetting Artist, born 1949 in Wilhelmshaven.

- 1972 – 1978 Studies painting at the Hochschule der Künste (Academy of Fine Arts), Berlin, with Prof. Hans Jaenisch
- 1977 Co-founder of the Galerie am Moritzplatz with Helmut Middendorf, Bernd Zimmer, Salomé, Anne Jud and Berthold Schepers.
- 1978 DAAD Scholarship for residence in New York
- 1983 – 1994 lives in New York and Berlin
- 1996 Willy Brandt sculpture for Willy Brandt House, Berlin
- 2005 Portrait sculpture of Henri Nannen for the Henri Nannen Press Award
- 2006 7 sculptures of Helmut Schmidt
- Fetting lives and works in Berlin and on the island of Sylt, both Germany.

== Artistic development ==
After having been trained as a carpenter and a stage designer at the Landesbühne Niedersachsen in Wilhelmshaven, Germany, Fetting moved to Berlin and enrolled at the Berliner Hochschule für Bildende Künste, studying painting with Hans Jaenisch from 1972 through 1978. In his final year at the academy he, together with Anne Jud, Helmut Middendorf, Stefan Roloff, Berthold Schepers, Salomé and Bernd Zimmer founded the Galerie am Moritzplatz as a self-help project, in order to be able to exhibit their colorful figurative paintings in an art scene still dominated by minimalism, conceptual art, as well as Berlin Realism. The artists exhibiting at the gallery basically formed the core of the art movement that came to be known and rapidly achieved international acclaim as the „Neue Wilde“ (or „Junge Wilde“). Fetting at the time focused on Berlin cityscapes, portraits and figurative work (e.g."Van Gogh At The Wall"), painted in strong colors, and including many depictions of the Berlin Wall. In 1980 he participated in the exhibition Heftige Malerei“ in the Haus am Waldsee, Berlin, in 1981 he was part of the exhibition New Spirit in Painting organized by Christos M. Joachimides and Norman Rosenthal at the Royal Academy of Arts in London, and in 1982 he participated in the exhibition “Zeitgeist” in the Martin-Gropius-Bau, Berlin. After that he had many solo exhibitions in reputable galleries both in Europe and in the United States, such as Bruno Bischofberger, Mary Boone, Yvon Lambert, Daniel Templon, the Marlborough Gallery, New York, or Anthony d'Offay. In early 1983, the Musée d'Art Contemporain de Bordeaux presented an exhibition of collaborative works by Luciano Castelli, Fetting, and Salomé. The three artists also performed the concert »Opéra par hasard« in Bordeaux and Paris (Fetting on drums). ). In 1984 he participated in the exhibitions Von hier aus – Zwei Monate neue deutsche Kunst in Düsseldorf and An International Survey of Recent Painting and Sculpture at the MoMA, New York, in 1988 he was part of the exhibition Refigured Painting – The German Image 1960–1988 at the Guggenheim Museum, New York. Between 1983 and 1994, Fetting spent part of his time in New York City, where he had already spent a year in 1978 on a grant from the DAAD. In his paintings, Fetting continued to explore the topic of the cityscape. Starting in 1984, while in New York, he experimented with assemblages of drift wood mounted on canvas and painted over. Paintings by Fetting were used as the works of Willem Dafoe's character in the 1985 film To Live and Die in L.A., in which Fetting had a cameo as a priest. In 1986, he also started doing bronze sculptures. His best known work is the 3,40-meters-high sculpture of former West German chancellor Willy Brandt, placed in the foyer of the SPD party headquarters in Berlin, Germany. In 2003/04 he was included in the exhibition Obsessive Malerei - Ein Rückblick auf die Neuen Wilden. Recent highlights were the solo shows “Return of the Giants. Rainer Fetting Sculptures” (2008) and "Mancapes" (2010) at Gerhard-Marcks-Haus in Bremen and at Kunsthalle Tübingen. In 2011 the museum Berlinische Galerie honored the artist Rainer Fetting with an extensive solo exhibition.

== Exhibitions ==
Solo Exhibitions (selection)

- Galerie am Moritzplatz, Berlin 1977, 1978
- Anthony d’Offay, London 1981, 1982
- Bruno Bischhofberger, Zurich 1981
- Mary Boone, New York 1981, 1982
- Paul Maenz, Cologne 1982
- Yvon Lambert, Paris 1983
- Marlborough Gallery, New York 1984, 1986
- Galerie Daniel Templon, Paris 1985, 1987
- Galerie Thomas, Munich 1985
- Museum Folkwang, Essen 1986
- Kunsthalle Basel, Basel 1986
- Galerie Würthle, Vienna 1987
- Raab Galerie, Berlin/London 1979, 1984, 1985, 1986, 1987, 1988, 1989, 1991, 1992, 1993
- Museo di Barcelona, Barcelona 1989
- Staatliche Museen zu Berlin, Nationalgalerie / DDR 1990
- Stadtmuseum Weimar, Weimar 1990
- Galleria Gian Ferrari Arte Contemporanea, Milan 1990
- Harenberg City-Center, Dortmund 1994
- Collection Martin Sanders, Staatliches Russisches Museum, St. Petersburg 1995
- Galerie Tammen und Busch, Berlin 1995, 1996, 1999
- Boukamel Contemporary Art Gallery (BCA), London 1998, 1999, 2000, 2002
- Galerie Michael Schultz, Berlin 1999
- NBK, Berlin 1999
- Stiftung Schleswig-Holsteinisches Landesmuseum, Landesmuseum Schloß Gottorf 2000
- Kunsthalle in Emden, Emden 2001
- Galerie Borchardt, Hamburg 2004, 2005
- Kunsthalle Wilhelmshaven, Wilhelmshaven 1997, 2005
- Galerie Deschler, Berlin 2005, 2009
- Studio d’Arte Cannaviello, Milan 1983, 1985, 1986, 1988, 2007
- Galerie Pfefferle, Munich 1988, 1991, 1992, 1994, 1996, 1997, 2000, 2002, 2004, 2006, 2008
- Gerhard Marcks Haus, Bremen, 2008
- Toskanische Säulenhalle, Augsburg, 2009
- Kunsthalle Tübingen, 2010
- Berlinische Galerie – Museum of Modern Art, Photography and Architecture, 2011

Group Exhibitions (selection)

- „Heftige Malerei”, Haus am Waldsee, Berlin 1980
- „A New Spirit in Painting”, Royal Academy of Art, London 1981
- „Berlin, eine Stadt für Künstler", Kunsthalle Wilhelmshaven, Wilhelmshaven 1982
- „Zeitgeist”, Martin-Gropius-Bau, Berlin 1982
- „New Art”, Tate Gallery, London 1983
- „Castelli, Salomé, Fetting”, CAPC, Bordeaux 1983
- „Origin y Vision: Nueva Pintura Alemana”, Centre Cultural de la Caixa de Pensions Barcelona; Palacio Velázquez, Madrid (ES); Museo de Arte Moderno, Mexico City (MX) 1984
- „An International Survey of Recent Painting and Sculpture“, Museum of Modern Art, New York 1984
- „Berlinart 1967–1987”, Museum of Modern Art, New York 1987
- Museum of Modern Art, San Francisco 1987
- Toledo Museum of Art, Toledo 1988
- „Refigured Painting. The German Image 1960–1988”, Guggenheim Museum, New York 1989
- „New Paintings from Berlin”, Tel Aviv Museum, Tel Aviv 1992
- „The Portrait Now”, National Portrait Gallery, London 1993
- “Sammlung Piepenbrock. Farbe.Form.Zeichen”, Stiftung Schleswig-Holsteinische Landesmuseen Schloß Gottorf, 2002
- „Expressiv”, Fondation Beyeler, Riehen/Basel 2003
- „Obsessive Malerei”, zkm, Karlsruhe 2003
- „Go, Johnny, Go!”, Kunsthalle Wien, Vienna 2003
- „Il Nudo”, Galleria d´Arte moderna, Bologna 2004
- „(my private) Heroes”, Museum MARTa Herford, Herford 2005
- „Deutsche Bilder aus der Sammlung Ludwig”, Ludwigsgalerie Schloss Oberhausen, Oberhausen 2006
- „Kunst und Kanzler”, Villa Grisebach, Berlin 2007
- „Von Spitzweg bis Baselitz. Streifzüge durch die Sammlung Würth“, Forum Würth Arlesheim, Arlesheim 2007
- „Feldforschung Stadt > 29 Antworten. Bilder gesellschaftlichen Wandels 2. Eine Kooperation der Schrader-Stiftung und des Hessischen Landesmuseums Darmstadt“, Galerie der Schrader-Stiftung, Darmstadt 2007
- „Getroffen. Otto Dix und die Kunst des Porträts“, Kunstmuseum Stuttgart, Stuttgart 2007
- „Arte e Omosessualità. da von Gloeden a Pierre Gilles“, Palazzo della Ragione, Mailand 2007
- “Berlin 89/09- Kunst zwischen Spurensuche und Utopi”, Berlinische Galerie– Landesmuseum für Moderne Kunst, Fotografie und Architektur, Berlin 2009
- „20 Jahre Deutsche Einheit 1989–2009. Kunst im Schatten der Grenze“, Kunsthalle Schweinfurt, 2009
- „FALLMAUERFALL 61-89-09“, Ephraim Palais, Stadtmuseum Berlin, 2009
- „Macht zeigen – Kunst als Herrschaftsstrategie“, Deutsches Historisches Museum Berlin 2010
- „Nudes“ Galerie Bischofberger Zürich (CH), 2010
- „The 80s Revisited- aus der Sammlung Bischofberger“, Kunsthalle Bielefeld 2010
- „Körpernah- Akte/ Nudes“ Galerie Tammen Berlin, 2010
- “Animal Magnetism” Galerie Deschler, Berlin 2010
- “Berlin zeichnet!” Ludwig Museum Koblenz 2010
- “Walking the dog” Kunsthalle Osnabrück 2010
- „Der heilige Augenblick. Il Santo Momento“ Museum am Dom, Würzburg 2011
- „Aller Zauber liegt im Bild. Zeitgenössische Kunst der Benediktinerabtei Maria Laach in der Sammlung Würth“ Museum Würth, Künzelsau 2011
- „Schönheit und Natur Skulpturen am Rheinkilometer 529“, Gerda und Kuno Pieroth Stiftung, Bingen am Rhein 2011
- "Painting Forever! Keilrahmen", KW Institute for Contemporary Art, Berlin 2013

Public Collections

- Berlin Museum, Germany
- Berlinische Galerie, Landesmuseum für Moderne Kunst, Fotografie und Architektur, Berlin, Germany
- Fonds Régional d`Art Contemporain, Auvergne, France
- Nationalgalerie, Berlin, Germany
- Hamburger Bahnhof, Museum for Contemporary Art, Berlin (Collection Dr. Erich Marx), Germany
- Kunsthalle Emden, Henri und Eske Nannen Foundation, Germany
- Collection Würth, Künzelsau, Germany
- Collection Ludwig, Schloss Oberhausen, Germany
- Museum of Contemporary Art/ ZKM Karlsruhe, Germany
- Museum Folkwang, Essen, Germany
- Stiftung Kunstforum Berliner Volksbank, Germany
- Bundeskanzleramt (Chancellery), Berlin, Germany
- German Bundestag, Germany
- Sammlung des Bundesinnenministeriums (Collection of the Federal Ministry of the Interior), Bonn, Germany
- Kunsthalle Kiel, Germany
- Museum Ludwig, Aachen, Germany
- Bavarian Academy of Fine Arts, Munich, Germany
- Foundation Haus der Geschichte, Bonn, Germany
- Museum Gunzenhauser, Chemnitz, Germany
- Museum am Dom, Würzburg, Germany
- Hessisches Landesmuseum Darmstadt, Germany
- Kunsthalle Wilhelmshaven, Germany
- Rogaland Museum of Fine Art, Stavanger, Norway
- Museum für Gegenwartskunst, Basel, Switzerland
- Museum des 20. Jahrhunderts, Wien, Austria
- National Museum of Art, Architecture and Design, Oslo, Norway
- Sintra Museum of Modern Art, Portugal
- Musée Cantini, Marseille, France
- Musée Cannes, France
- Musée d‘Art Contemporain, Bourg-en-Bresse, France
- Musée de la Passion, Lille, France
- Berkeley Museum, California, USA
- Remington Collection, Detroit, USA
- Virginia Museum of Fine Arts, Richmond, Virginia, USA
- Weisman Collection, Los Angeles, USA
- Museum of Contemporary Art San Diego, USA
- Art Gallery of South Australia, Adelaide, Australia
- Kunstsammlung Gera
- Städel Museum Frankfurt/ Main
- Portland Art Museum, Oregon, USA

== Bibliography ==
By Rainer Fetting:

- Self Portraits 1973–1998. Nicolai'Sche Verlagsbuchhandlung, ISBN 3-87584-886-1
- Rainer Fetting – Gemälde und Zeichnungen; with Hermann Wiesler, Gregory Volk, Sibylle Kretschmer, Harenberg, 2000, ISBN 3-611-00424-3
- Landschaften / Landscapes; with Achim Sommer, Edition Brau, 2001, ISBN 3-926318-57-0
- Rainer Fetting – Los Angeles Surfscapes. Kerber, 2004, ISBN 3-936646-97-X

Exhibition catalogues, monographs:

- Cristian Rathke, Diesja Turkina, Alexander Borovskij: Rainer Fetting und Zeitgenossen aus der Sammlung Martin Sanders. Palace Edition, 1995, ISBN 3-930775-12-3
- Rainer Fetting trifft Lovis Corinth. Kunsthalle Wilhelmshaven, Kerber, 2005, ISBN 3-938025-38-7
- Helmut Schmidt: Skulpturen und Bilder von Rainer Fetting, Kerber, 2007, ISBN 978-3-86678-064-4
- Rückkehr der Giganten. Rainer Fetting, Skulpturen, Gerhard-Marcks-Haus Bremen. Kerber, 2008, ISBN 978-3-86678-231-0
- FETTING. With contributions by Arie Hartog and Jan Hoet and an interview by Heinz Stahlhut, Cologne. Dumont Verlag, 2009, ISBN 978-3-8321-9203-7
- Rainer Fetting – Berlin, Berlinische Galerie, with contributions by Klaus Wowereit [Message], Thomas Köhler, Travis Jeppesen, Guido Fassbender, Heinz Stahlhut and Simone Wiechers, Berlin. Hirmer Verlag, 2011, ISBN 978-3-7774-4021-7

Articles:

- Alice Pfeiffer, "Rainer Fetting and Christian Schoeler On the Male Figure", Art in America, 12/08/09
- Viola Rühse, "Rainer Fettings Fotografie. Zur Vermarktung des ′Wilden′. (Rainer Fetting′s Photography. About the Marketing of the ′Wild′)", ALL-OVER., no. 4, spring 2013.

== See also ==
- List of German painters
