= Horacio Cordero (painter) =

Argentine painter, sculptor and ceramicist

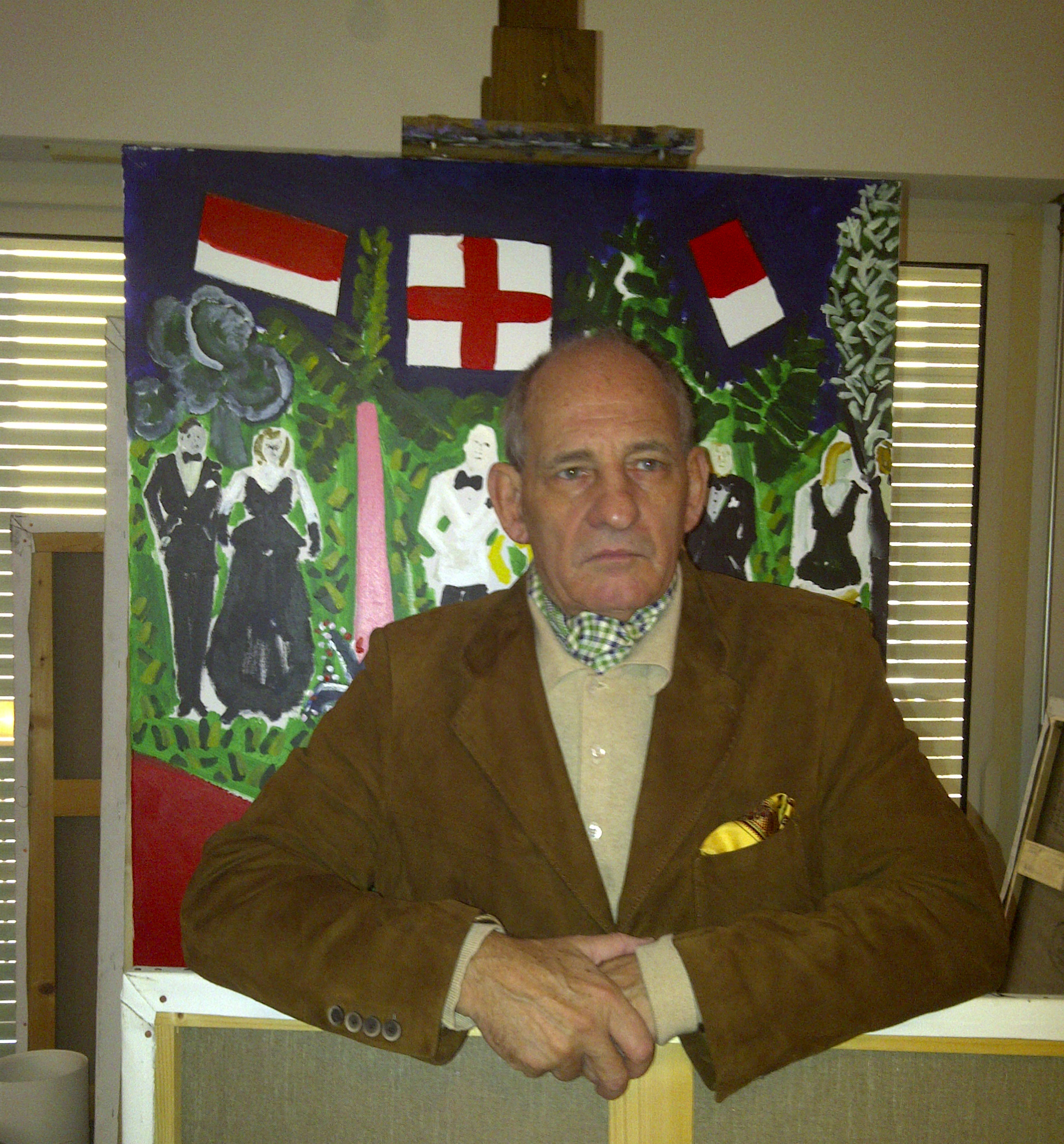
- Horacio Cordero
- Born: Horacio Rodolfo de Sosa Cordero; June 29, 1945; Buenos Aires, Argentina
- Died: June 12, 2014 (aged 68); MON Principality of Monaco
- Known for: Painting, drawing, sculpture printmaking, ceramics, stage design, writing
- Movement: Transavantgarde

Horacio Rodolfo de Sosa Cordero (June 29, 1945 – June 12, 2014), 10th Marquis de Sosa, was an Argentine painter, sculptor and ceramicist.

== Biography ==
Cordero was born in Buenos Aires, Argentina. The only male child of Don Rodolfo María de Sosa Cordero and Dña. Ángela Marcó del Pont, his first studies with Jesuit priests were instrumental in the discovery of his vocation as an artist. He belonged to an ancient aristocratic Spanish family whose history dates back to the 14th century in the lands of Castile.

In 1965, he established himself in Paris, France and began a great friendship with Alberto Giacometti and Diego Giacometti, with whom he worked, at the sculptor's request, in the last stage of his life, to develop patinas especially for the Musée Picasso – Hôtel Salé, Paris. At the same time, he also knew Francis Bacon, Pablo Picasso, the Vicountess Marie-Laure de Noailles, Antenor Patiño, Porfirio Rubirosa, Charles de Beistegui, Alexis de Redé, Emilio Terry, Aristóteles Onassis and his daughter Cristina Onassis, among other international personalities who all began collecting his work.

In 1980, he was invited to participate at the Venice Biennale, in the "Aperto 80" exhibition, where he presented " Entartete Kunst" or "Art Degenere", a painting started in 1977 in the artist's atelier in Piazza Navona, Rome and finished in 1980 in time for the exhibition. He is one of the main representatives of the Transvanguardia movement, along with Sandro Chia, Francesco Clemente, Mimmo Paladino, Nicola De Maria, and Enzo Cucchi, however he never joined a specific pictoric movement, he only participated.

In addition to being a painter and sculptor, Horacio Cordero was a writer, photographer, ceramicist and a jewel and brass furniture designer. He designed for the world-famous architect and interior designer Juan Pablo Molyneux.

Horacio Cordero worked and lived in New York City, Monte Carlo, Paris, London, Italy and Buenos Aires. Member of ADAGP, he signed his works as: Horacio Cordero.

He died on June 12, 2014, just days before his 69th birthday, in the Princess Grace Hospital of Monaco after a long illness.

Horacio Cordero Foundation is the only institution authorized by the artist to provide opinions or authenticity certificates of Horacio Cordero’s work. At the present time, the foundation is preparing the artist’s catalogue raisonné: Horacio Cordero, Paintings – Sculptures.

== Horacio Cordero’s art works in international collections ==
- Argentina: Church of Nuestra Señora del Transito, in Salta. (Stations of the Cross, with the twelve stations in 70 x 50 cm oils, painted in 1972, commissioned by Monseñor Casado, that later on became Salta City’s Bishop, Argentina).
- Argentina: Juan Carlos Castagnino Municipal Museum of Art, Mar del Plata.
- Argentina: Dr. Juan R. Vidal Provincial Museum of Fine Art, Corrientes.
- Argentina: La Boca’s Fine Arts Museum "Benito Quinquela Martín", Buenos Aires.
- Argentina: Municipal Museum of Modern Art, Mendoza.
- Argentina: Juan B. Castagnino Fine Arts Museum, Rosario.
- Argentina: Municipal Museum, Santa Fe.
- Argentina: Ramón Gómez Cornet Museum of Fine Art, Santiago del Estero.
- Argentina: Dr. Pedro E. Martinez Provincial Museum of Fine Art, Paraná.
- Argentina: Hugo Irureta Fine Arts Foundation, Tilcara.
- Argentina: Regional Museum of Painting "José Antonio Terry", Jujuy.
- Argentina: Municipal Museum of Fine Arts, Tandil.
- Argentina: Circulo Militar Argentino, Buenos Aires (Battle of Obligado).
- Argentina: Salta Department of Culture.

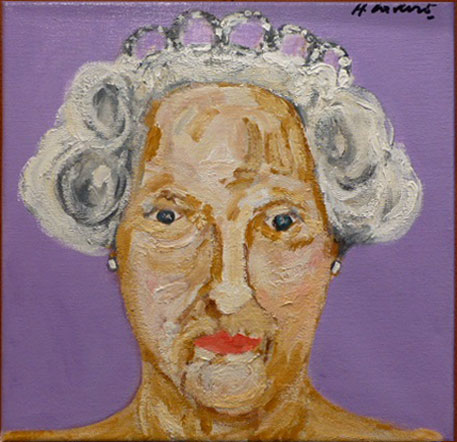
Queen Elizabeth II Oil on canvas, 0,30 x 0,30cm London, 2001 Private Collection, Windsor, England.

- Argentina: Jujuy Department of Culture.
- Argentina: Neuquen Department of Culture.
- Belgium: Veranemann Ganz Foundation.
- Bolivia: National Art Museum, La Paz.
- Brazil: Museum of Modern Art, Rio de Janeiro
- Brazil: Bahia Museum of Modern Art – MAM/BA.
- Chile: Chilean National Museum of Fine Arts.
- Cuba: Horacio Cordero Foundation, Havana.
- USA: Museum of Modern Art MOMA, New York.
- USA: Museum of Latin American Art
- France: Museum of Modern Art, Paris.
- France: San Martin Museum, Boulogne-sur-Mer.
- France: FNAC: National Art Collection of Contemporary Art, Paris.
- Netherlands: Museum of Modern Art, Amsterdam.
- Italy: Lucio Amelio Foundation, Naples.
- Italy: Yacht Club Porto Rotondo, Sardinia.
- Monaco: Yacht Club, Principality of Monaco.
- Paraguay: National Museum of Fine Arts of Asunción.

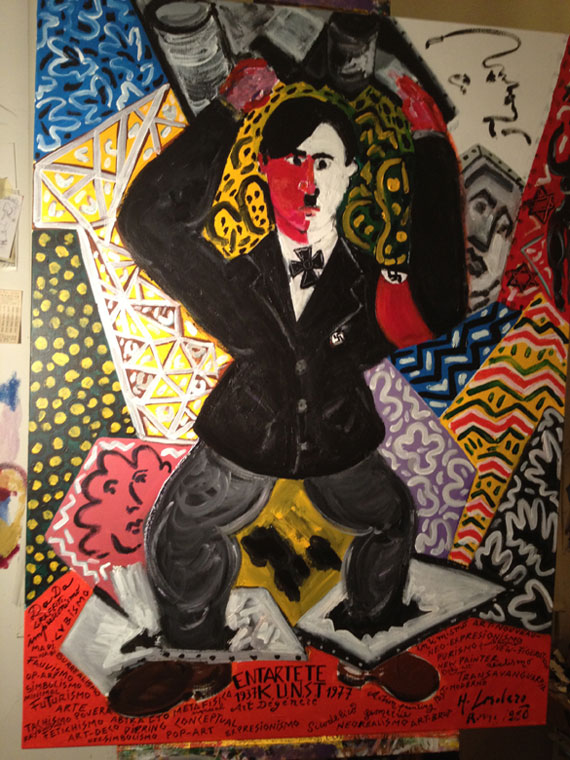
Entartete-Kunst or Degenerate Art Oil and acrylic on canvas, 90 x 130 cm Rome, 1977 / 1980 Exhibitions: 1980 – Venice Biennale, Italy. "APERTO 80". 1981 – Lennox Gallery, New York USA. Exhibition 4 C . (Chia Clemente, Cordero, Cucchi) 1983 – Lucio Amelio Gallery, Naples, Italy. 1983 – Museum of Modern Art, Paris, France. "Le Nouvel Figuración". 1984 – 1st.ART FAIR, London England. Galerie Lavrov Paris. 1985 – ART BASEL, D’Eendt Gallery, Amsterdam. (Kieffer, Cordero, Baselitz, Schnabel.) 1986 – Vijande Gallery. Madrid, Spain. 1987 – Matignon 32 Gallery. Master Pieces Exhibition, Transvanguardia Artists: Cordero, Chia, Clemente, Cucchi. (4 C) 2004 – ART FAIR PALM BEACH. Lennox Gallery, Miami, USA. Private Collection, Paris – France.

== Selected exhibitions ==
- 1964 – Le Petit Galerie. Rio de Janeiro – Brazil.
- 1965 – Galerie de Seine. Paris – France.
- 1966 – Wildenstein Gallery. Buenos Aires – Argentina.
- 1967 – Galerie de Seine. Paris – France.
- 1968 – Le Petit Galerie. Rio de Janeiro – Brazil.
- 1970 – Rio de Janeiro Museum – Brazil.
- 1975 – Van Riel Gallery (4 rooms). Buenos Aires – Argentina.
- 1976 – Antares Gallery. Cannes – France.
- 1977 – Quinquela Martin, H. Sosa Cordero, Galeria Rocca & Birger. Buenos Aires – Argentina.
- 1977 – H. Gallery, Buenos Aires – Argentina.
- 1978 – Bahia Museum of Modern Art. Salvador da Bahía – Brazil.
- 1979 – Museum of Modern Art. Santiago de Chile – Chile.
- 1980 – C.A.R.A.T. Iris Clert Gallery. Neuilly-Sur-Seine – France.
- 1980 – Venice Biennale (Aperto 80). Venice – Italy.
- 1980 – Lucio Amelio Gallery. Naples – Italy.
- 1981 – Durban Gallery. Madrid – Spain.
- 1982 – Great Palace. Paris – France.
- 1983 – Lavrov Gallery. Paris – France.

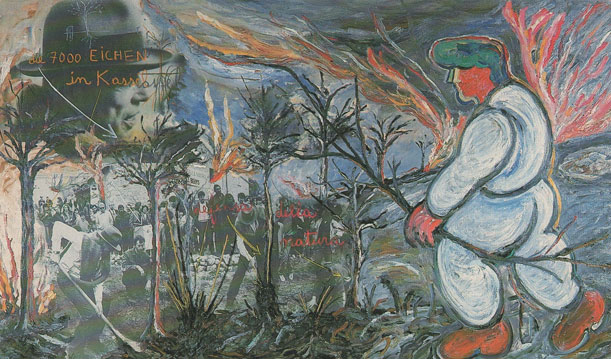
Difesa Della Natura Collaboration: Horacio Cordero/Josef Beuys. Oil on canvas, 280 x 160 cm. Collection, Museum of Modern Art, Amsterdam, Netherlands

- 1983 – ABC Gallery. Casablanca – Morocco.
- 1984 – 1st Air Fair London. Lavrov Gallery.
- 1984 – L'oeil de Boeuf. Cérès Franco. Paris – France.
- 1985 – FIAC Paris – France.
- 1985 – Futura Gallery. London – England.
- 1985 – Brompton Gallery. London – England.
- 1986 – Van Dyck Gallery. Eindhoven – Netherlands.
- 1986 – D'Eendt Gallery. Amsterdam – Netherlands
- 1986 – Arco. Madrid – Spain.
- 1987 – Penagos Gallery. Bogotá – Colombia.
- 1988 – Brompton Gallery. London – England.
- 1990 – Lennox Gallery. New York – USA.
- 1995 – Lennox Gallery. New York – USA.
- 2000 – Palm Beach Art Fair. Lennox Gallery. New York – USA.
- 2004 – Lennox Gallery. Miami, Florida – USA.
- 2006 – Lennox Gallery. New York – USA.
- 2006 – Christie's (DECO.) New York – USA.
- 2009 – Celita de Cárdenas Foundation. Monte Carlo. ECO – PARADE, (Monumental – Sculpture). Monte Carlo – Monaco.
- 2011 – Venice Biennale. Francis Bacon, Horacio Cordero. Venice – Italy.
- 2011 – Harter Gallery. 5NewWorks (Sculptures). Nice – France. (February – April)
- 2011/12 – Modern Art Gallery Jean-Pierre Harter. Nice – France. (October 2011 – April 2012). Exhibition "Las Meninas after Velázquez".
- 2012 – Picasso Museum. Paris – France. (may – September). "Las Meninas after Velázquez". Paintings, gouaches, sculptures.
- 2012 – Matthieu Monluc Gallery (3 rue de Beaune, 75007). Paris – France (may – June). Exhibition "MASQUES", 20 unique pieces Carre Rive Guache, paintings on "boîtes de camembert", mixed technique, diameter 20 cm (catalogue).
- 2014 – Gagosian Gallery. New York – USA.
