= Documenta 7 =

1982 art exhibition in Kassel, West Germany

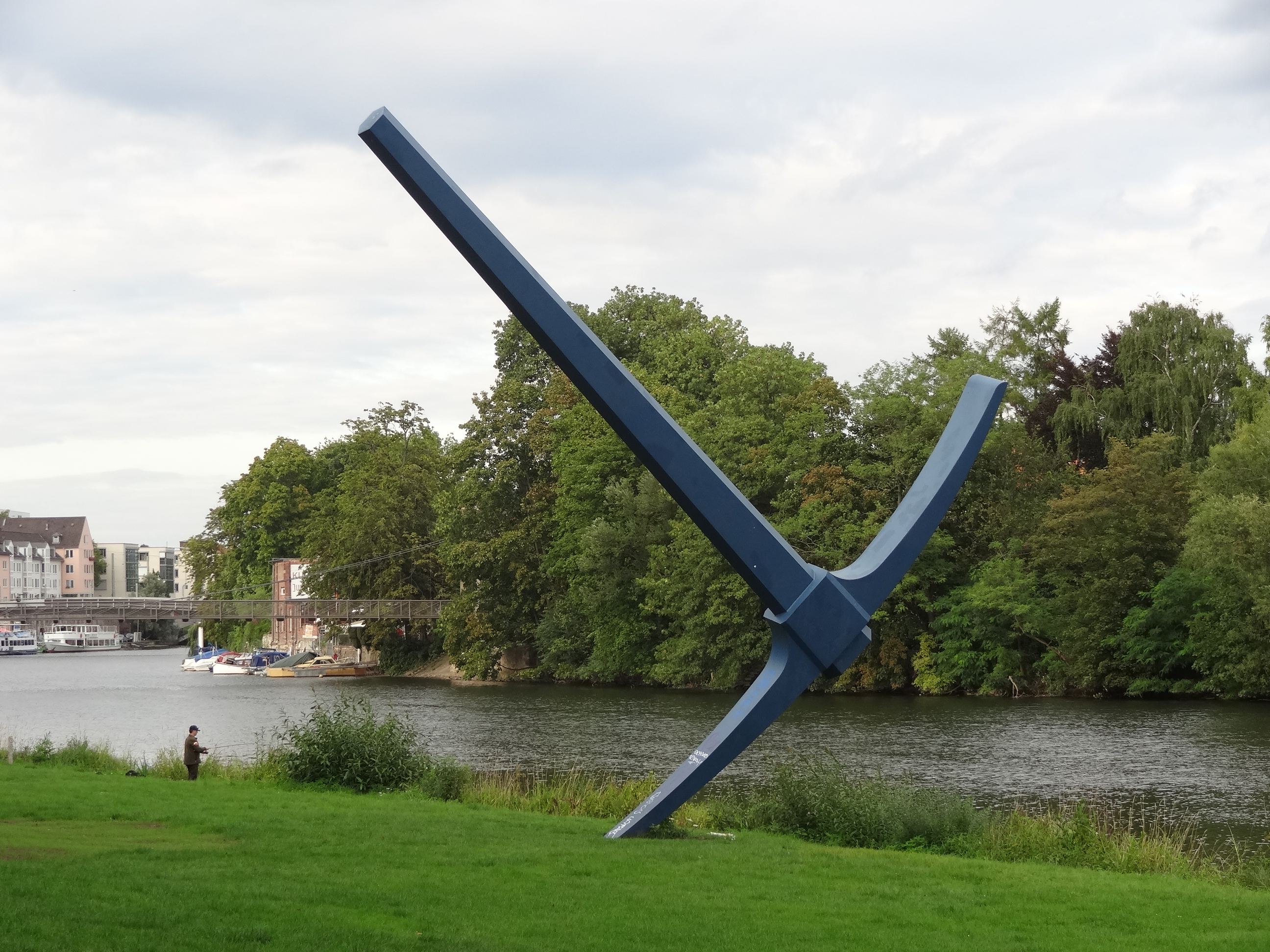
Spitzhacke (Claes Oldenburg) 02

documenta 7 was the seventh edition of documenta, a quinquennial contemporary art exhibition. It was held between 19 June and 28 October 1982 in Kassel, West Germany. The artistic director was Rudi Fuchs.

== Participants ==
A
Marina Abramović	Carl Andre	Siah Armajani	Richard Artschwager
Vito Acconci	Giovanni Anselmo	Armando	Michael Asher
Anatol	Siegfried Anzinger	Art & Language
B
Elvira Bach	Robert Barry	Joseph Beuys	Troy Brauntuch	Alberto Burri
Marco Bagnoli	Georg Baselitz	James Biederman	Marcel Broodthaers	Scott Burton
Gerrit van Bakel	Jean-Michel Basquiat	Dara Birnbaum	Stanley Brouwn	Michael Buthe
John Baldessari	Lothar Baumgarten	Alighiero e Boetti	Günter Brus	James Lee Byars
Miquel Barceló	Bernd and Hilla Becher	Jonathan Borofsky	Daniel Buren
C
Miriam Cahn	John Chamberlain	Sandro Chia	Francesco Clemente	Tony Cragg
Loren D. Calaway	Alan Charlton	Abraham David Christian	Enzo Cucchi
D
Walter Dahn	Nicola De Maria	Jiří Georg Dokoupil	Marlene Dumas
René Daniëls	Jan Dibbets	Gino de Dominicis	Edward Dwurnik
Hanne Darboven	Martin Disler	Felix Droese
E
Ger van Elk
F
Luciano Fabro	Stanislav Filko	Barry Flanagan	Hamish Fulton
G
General Idea	Ludger Gerdes	Jack Goldstein	Dan Graham
Isa Genzken	Gilbert & George	Ludwig Gosewitz	Erwin Gross
H
Hans Haacke	Frank van Hemert	Albert Hien	Hans van Hoek	Rebecca Horn
Keith Haring	J.C.J. van der Heyden	Antonius Höckelmann	Jenny Holzer
I
Jörg Immendorff
J
Joan Jonas	Donald Judd
K
On Kawara	Per Kirkeby	John Knight	Joseph Kosuth	Barbara Kruger
Anselm Kiefer	Pierre Klossowski	Imi Knoebel	Jannis Kounellis
L
Wolfgang Laib	Barry Le Va	Sol LeWitt	Richard Paul Lohse	Markus Lüpertz
Maria Lassnig	Bernhard Leitner	Christian Lindow	Richard Long
Bertrand Lavier	Sherrie Levine	Guido Lippens	Robert Longo
M
Luigi Mainolfi	Carlo Maria Mariani	Gerhard Merz	Klaus Mettig
Robert Mangold	Stephen McKenna	Mario Merz	Matt Mullican
Robert Mapplethorpe	Bruce McLean	Marisa Merz
N
Bruce Nauman	Hermann Nitsch	John Nixon	Maria Nordman
O
Oswald Oberhuber	Claes Oldenburg	Meret Oppenheim	Eric Orr
P
Mimmo Paladino	Giulio Paolini	Giuseppe Penone	Sigmar Polke
Brett De Palma	A. R. Penck	Michelangelo Pistoletto	Norbert Prangenberg
Q
Lee Quiñones
R
David Rabinowitch	Roland Reiss	Martha Rosler	Reiner Ruthenbeck
Markus Raetz	Gerhard Richter	Edward Ruscha	Ulrich Rückriem
Arnulf Rainer	Judy Rifka	Claude Rutault	Robert Ryman
S
David Salle	Julião Sarmento	Jean-Frédéric Schnyder	Cindy Sherman	Peter Struycken
Salome	Klaudia Schifferle	Horst Schuler	Katharina Sieverding	Hans-Jürgen Syberberg
Remo Salvadori	Barbara Schmidt-Heins	Richard Serra	Ettore Spalletti
Sarkis Zabunyan	Gabriele Schmidt-Heins	Joel Shapiro	Klaus Staeck
T
Volker Tannert	Imants Tillers	Richard Tuttle
Signe Theill	Niele Toroni	Cy Twombly
U
Ulay
V
Emilio Vedova	Toon Verhoef	Jean-Luc Vilmouth	Antonio Violetta
W
Jeff Wall	Andy Warhol	Boyd Webb	Ian Wilson
Franz Erhard Walther	Isolde Wawrin	Lawrence Weiner
Z
Rémy Zaugg	Michele Zaza
