= Angelo Marino =

Italian art dealer and curator

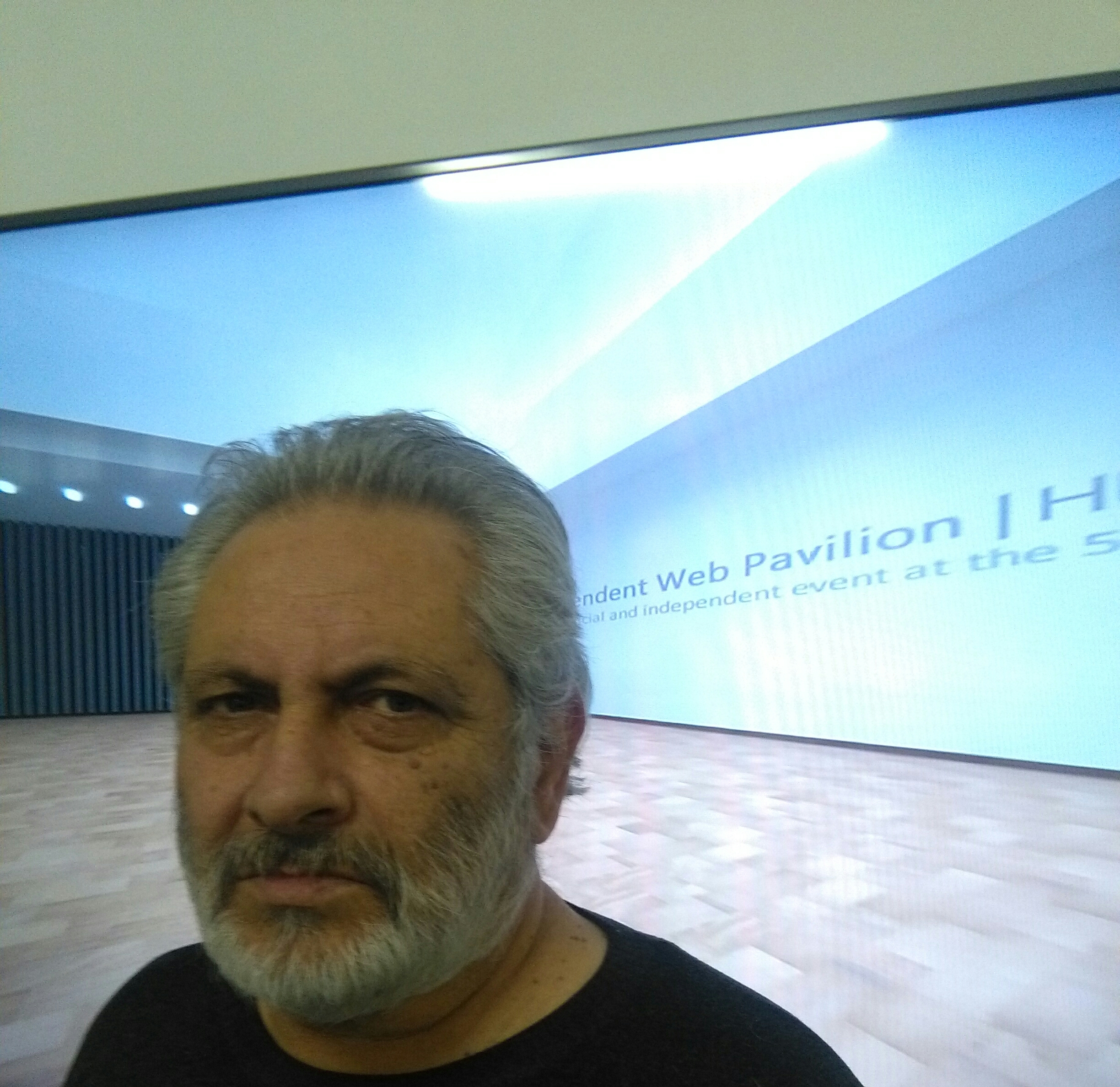
Angelo Marino, 2013

Angelo Marino (April 30, 1956 – October 10, 2018) was an Italian art dealer and curator. He was the first Italian gallery owner to turn his gallery, dirartecontemporanea, into a virtual exhibition space (dirartecontemporanea 2.0).

== Biography ==
Angelo Marino was born in Frattaminore. In 1991, he founded the gallery dirartecontemporanea in Caserta. In 2001, he organized a group of seminars at the Belvedere San Leucio Caserta, Scavare il futuro: nuovi spazi antichi, in collaboration with Elmar Zorn and City of Caserta. In the same year, he collaborated to the installation of the exhibition Plus Ultra at the Royal Palace of Caserta.

In 2003, he curated Un anfiteatro per la Pace: stendardi d'artista, an exhibition featuring the work of Carla Accardi, Arcangelo, Angelo Bellobono, Elisabetta Benassi, Dafni & Papadatos, Gianni Dessi, Francesco Impellizzeri, Jannis Kounellis, H.H. Lim, Mafonso, Luigi Mainolfi, Fabio Mauri, Sukran Moral, Hidetoshi Nagasawa, Luigi Ontani and Giacomo Zaza in Piazza Dante in Caserta. In 2005, he organised Il senso del male, an exhibition conceived as a reflection on the tense political climate following 9/11 questioning the meaning of evil at Chiostro di S. Agostino in Caserta.

In 2012, Marino converted dirartecontemporanea into a virtual gallery where artists were invited to create works specifically in a web-related context. His idea was to propose a new way to experience contemporary art, without geographical and temporal boundaries. The first exhibition was Max Coppeta: visioni transitorie. Works 2001.2012. In 2013, the project was expanded to the Independent Web-Pavilion of the Indigenous Tribes of the Amazon Basin, a tribute to the tribes of native tribes from the Amazon forest still unaffected by Globalisation. This was followed by the 2nd Independent Web Pavilion: Humanity, Betrayed & Traitors.

In 2016, he created the D2.0-box, an exhibition space where a large screen would enable the audience to meet and discuss online exhibitions.

Marino was also a friend and mentor of many artists from the Campania region, including, Antonio Biasiucci, Nino Longobardi, Mafonso, Piero Chiariello, Arturo Casanova, Luigi Auriemma, Bruno Fermariello, Gloria Pastore and Mariano Filippetta. In 2016, he celebrated this connection in the exhibition Friends

Marino died on October 10, 2018.

== Exhibitions ==
- Max Coppeta: visioni transitorie. Works 2001.2012
- Mariano Filippetta: Le mie voglie col blu
- Independent Web-Pavilion of the Indigenous Tribes of the Amazon Basin
- Mafonso: Di_segni. Works 2013
- Piero Chiariello: Natura Digitale
- Claudia Jares: My Long Play
- '2nd Independent Web Pavilion: Humanity – Betrayed & Traitors
- Mariano Filippetta: Il grande mare della notte
- Reperti
- Plus Ultra di Mafonso, fifteen years later
- Mario Velocci: Spazio.Linea.Suono curated bay Martina Velocci, 17 October 2017
- Trovamento: frammenti di artisti in mostra da D2.0-box.
- My Work Tells My Story: Chiara Coccorese May 2018
- My Work Tells My Story: Daniela Morante. Alfabeto Segnico 9 June 2018
- My Work Tells My Story: Gloria Pastore. L'Ermafrodita January 2018 23 June 2018
- My Work Tells My Story: Maria Adele Del Vecchio. Mirrors, June 2018

== Bibliography ==
- Francesco Gallo (ed), Angelo Marino promoter Plus Ultra
- Lorenzo Canova (ed), Il senso del male, contemporary Art Museum, Caserta Collocazione MAC3 MISC A 6
- Angelo Marino (ed), 2nd Independent Web Pavilion: Humanity. Betrayed & Traitors
- Ileana Maria Zaza (ed), Claudia Jares: My Long Play
- Angelo Marino (ed), 3rd Independent Web Pavilion: Indigenous Tribes of the Amazon Basin
- Veronica D'Auria (ed), Piero Chiariello: Natura Digitale
- Vincenzo Trione (ed), Atlante dell’Arte Contemporanea a Napoli e in Campania 1966—2016. Text by Loredana Troise, Electa Mondadori, Milan, 2017. ISBN 978-88-918-1085-4
