= Baldo (name) =

Baldo can be either a given name, a nickname or a surname. It may refer to:

== Given name ==
- Baldo of Gallura, the Giudice (ruler) of Gallura, on Sardinia (c. 1040-c. 1060)
- Baldo of Salzburg, 9th-century German priest, writer and teacher
- Baldo da Passignano (1244–1332), Italian poet and Hungarian official
- Baldo De' Serofini (fl. 1490–1520), Italian painter
- Baldus de Ubaldis (1327–1400), Baldo degli Ubaldi in Italian, Italian jurist
- Baldo Angelo Abati, 16th-century Italian physician and naturalist
- Baldo Baldi (1888–1961), Italian fencer and Olympic champion (team)
- Baldo Diodato (born 1938), Italian artist
- Baldassare "Baldo" di Gregorio (born 1984), German footballer
- Baldo Lupetino (1502–1566), Italian Protestant preacher
- Baldo Marro (1948–2017), Filipino actor, screenwriter, stunt director, film director and producer
- Baldo Prokurica (born 1958), Chilean lawyer, academic and politician
- Baldo Santana (born 1995), Spanish footballer known simply as Baldo

== Surname ==
- Elisa Baldo (born 1986), Italian archer
- Giuseppe Baldo (1914–2007), Italian footballer
- Giuseppe Baldo (1843–1915), Italian Catholic priest
- Maria Baldó i Massanet (1884–1964), Spanish teacher, feminist, folklorist, and liberal politician
- Marta Baldó (born 1979), Spanish rhythmic gymnast and Olympic and world champion
- Milla Baldo-Ceolin (1924–2011), Italian particle physicist
- Miro Baldo Bento (born 1975), Indonesian footballer
- Nicolas Baldo (born 1984), French cyclist
