= Nicola De Maria =

Italian artist and painter

Nicola De Maria (born 6 December 1954) is an Italian painter living and working in Turin, Italy. He is known for his abstract figurative works, which have been characterized as lyrical and colourful.

== Biography ==
De Maria was born on 6 December 1954 in Foglianise. He earned a master's degree in medicine but then in 1977 he executed his first wall painting in Milan. In the same year of 1977 DeMaria exhibited at the Paris Biennale.

He is most often associated with the art group termed the Transavanguardia, a movement named and first exhibited by the Italian art critic and curator Achille Bonito Oliva at the "Aperto 80" section of the 39th Venice Biennale in 1980. Along with De Maria the principal transavantgarde artists were; Sandro Chia, Francesco Clemente, Enzo Cucchi, Nino Longobardi, Luigi Ontani, and Mimmo Paladino.

== Exhibitions ==
In 1982 De Maria's work was included in documenta 7 in Kassel, Germany.

In 1990 De Maria once again exhibited at the Venice Biennale to which he contributed five "Space Paintings". His work was shown in the Italian Pavilion in an exhibition curated by Laura Cherubini, Flaminio Gualdoni and Lea Vergine.

In 2013 there was a retrospective of his work held at the Turin Civic Gallery of Modern and Contemporary Art, "The Madness to Come" curated by Danilo Eccher.

== Collections ==
- Stedelijk Museum, Amsterdam
- Pompidou Centre, Paris
- Castello di Rivoli in Turin, Italy
- Palazzi dell'Arte, Rimini, Italy
