= Nino Longobardi =

Italian artist (born 1953)

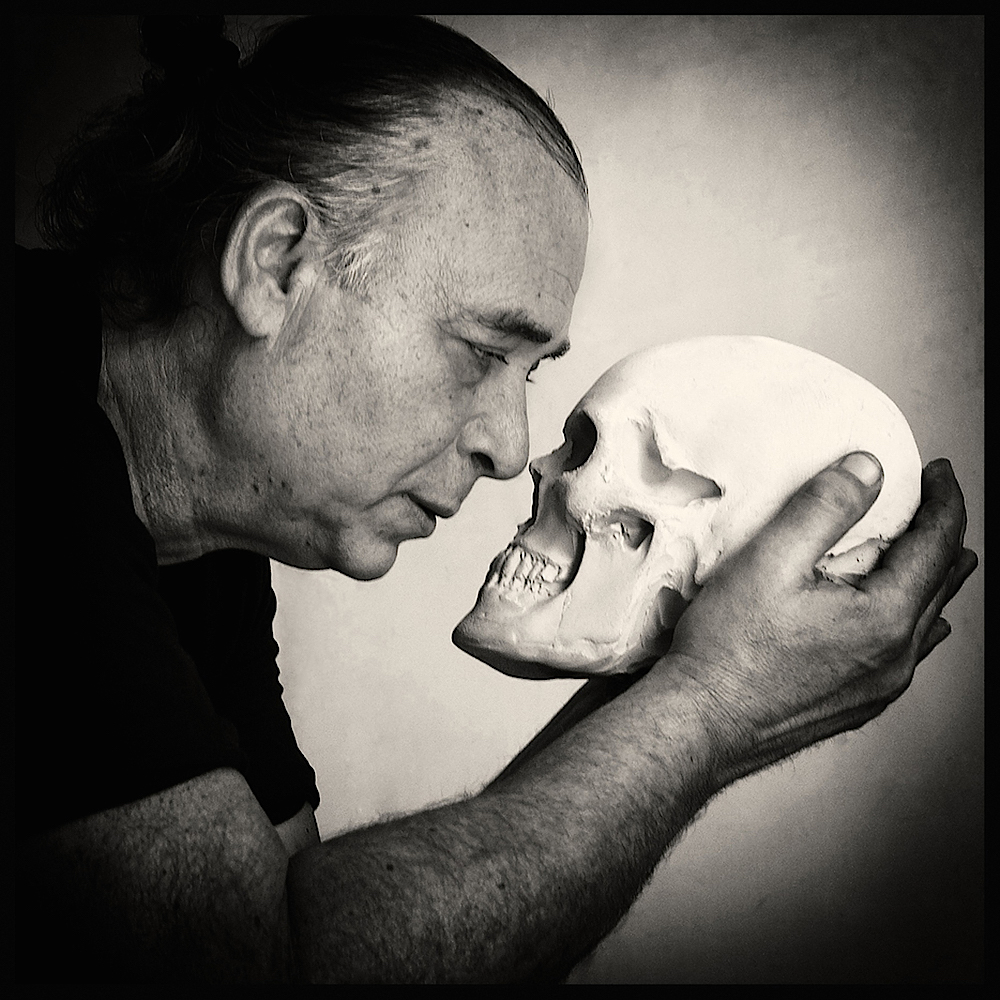
- Nino Longobardi in 2011, photographed by Augusto De Luca
- Born: 30 November 1953 (age 72); Naples, Italy
- Known for: painting, sculpture
- Movement: Transavantgarde

Nino Longobardi (born 1953) is an Italian artist, known for painting and sculpture.

== Biography ==
Nino Longobardi was born on 30 November 1953 in Naples, Italy. He was primarily a self-taught artist. In 1968, Longobardi met curator and art dealer Lucio Amelio, who introduced him to many artists and opportunities.

The 1980 Irpinia earthquake took place near Naples, causing a lot of damage, while changing Longobardi's art work and career. As a result of the earthquake, Amelio hosted a series of art exhibitions and created a body of curated work titled Terrae Motus Collection (Collezione Terrae Motus). The exhibitions stretched over several years and featured over 50 artists (including Longobardi) highlighting the theme of earthquakes.

After the earthquake, Longobardi started focusing his work on the human figure and the theme of life or death. His paintings began to display imagery such as skulls, swimmers, and nude figures posing. He used a limited color palette, often in black, white, browns, tans, and grays. Sometimes the work would have repeated imagery, visually similar to printmaking.

In 1982, Longobardi's work was featured in the exhibition "Italian Art Now: An American Perspective" at the Solomon R. Guggenheim Museum, alongside other Italian artists, Sandro Chia, Enzo Cucchi, Gilberto Zorio, Giuseppe Penone, Luigi Ontani, and Vettor Pisani.

Longobardi had his art studio and home in the Palazzo Tarsia, in the historic center of Naples.

The sculpture pavilion “Codice Italia” was exhibited at the 56th Venice Biennale, and included work by Nino Longobardi. His work is included in many public museum collections including the Metropolitan Museum of Art, Madre Museum, Museo ItaloAmericano, Princeton University Art Museum, among others. Longobardi was interviewed in the documentary film, Lucio Amelio/Terrae Motus (1993) directed by Mario Martone.

== Bibliography ==
- Longobardi, Nino (2004). Nino Longobardi (art exhibition, Galleria d'Arte Maggiore in Bologna). Edizione a cura della Galleria.
- Longbardi, Nino; Oliva, Achille Bonito (1988). Nino Longobardi, Visibile e Invisibile [Nino Longobardi, Visible and invisible]. Milan, Italy: Fabbri.
- Longbardi, Nino (1982). Nino Longobardi, Opere Su Carta (art exhibition catalog, Galleria Il Ponte in Florence). Florence, Italy: Galleria Il Ponte.
