= Mirko Vidaković =

Mirko pl. Vidaković (October 29, 1924 – August 15, 2002) was a Croatian botanist and dendrologist and the expert for the genetics of the forest trees.

== Biography ==
Vidaković was born in Lemeš, Bačka. He attained a professional qualification of engineer of forestry before 1949, when he was first employed as a lecturer at the Faculty of Forestry of the University of Zagreb (Croatian: Šumarski fakultet).

He was a full member of Croatian Academy of Sciences and Arts (HAZU) since 1981.

He was the head of the arboretum in Trsteno since 1970.

He worked as UNDP's and FAO's expert in Pakistan, Vietnam and Hungary.

Together with forestry of Našice, in 1996 he founded first clone seminal plantation of pedunculate oak in Croatia.

He died in Zagreb at the age of 77.

== Works ==
His works were published in various editions from international scientific gatherings, symposiums and consultations, mostly in area of ecological valorization of littoral carst, mechanization of agriculture, adaptation of forests to climate change etc.

He published his works in Annales forestales.

- Golosjemenjače, (co-author) 2004
- Obična bukva (Fagus sylvatica L.) u Hrvatskoj = Common beech (Fagus sylvatica L.) in Croatia , (co-author), 2003
- Obična jela (Abies alba Mill.) u Hrvatskoj = Silver fair (Abies alba Mill.) in Croatia, (co-author), 2001
- Estimation of genetic gain in a progeny trial of pedunculate oak (Quercus robur L.), (co-author) 2000
- Hrast lužnjak (Quercus robur L.) u Hrvatskoj = Pedunculate oak (Quercus robur L.) in Croatia, (co-author), 1996
- Experimental plots of some hard pine hybrid families in Croatia, (co-author) 1995
- Izravna sjetva da ili ne?, (co-author), 1994
- Tehnika za obradu tla, sjetvu i borbu protiv korova , (co-author), 1994
- Zrinjevac : spomenica : priroda, vrtovi, perivoji i uresno raslinstvo u Zagrebu, (co-author), 1995
- Novosti u tehnici obrade tla, (co-author), 1993
- Hrvatski umjetnici za Trsteno = Kroatische Kuenstler fuer das Arboretum Trsteno = Croatian artist for the Arboretum of Trsteno, (co-author) 1993
- Arboretum Brijuni, (co-author), 1993
- Radovi na podizanju klonske sjemenske plantaže hrasta lužnjaka na području Š. G. "Krndija" i Š. G. "Papuk", (co-author), 1992
- Čuvanje genskih resursa šumskog i hortikulturnog drveća i grmlja u Hrvatskoj , 1992
- Doprinos OLT-a integralnoj tehnici biljne proizvodnje , 1992
- Svjedočanstva: razaranje Dubrovnika, (co-author with few HAZU-members), 1992
- Kako agregatirati traktor za oranje? , 1991
- Growth of some interspecific hybrid pine seedlings and their cuttings , (co-author), 1991
- Prilog sanaciji erozije na području izvorišta rijeke Une, (co-author), 1991
- Sjetva jednosjemenim pneumatskim sijačicama , (co-author), 1990
- Uspijevanje nekih vrsta i hibrida dvoigličavih borova na području Arboretuma Trsteno , (co-author), 1990
- Arboretum Lisičine, (co-author), 1986
- Genetika i oplemenjivanje šumskog drveća , (co-author) 1985
- Zakorjenjivanje reznica ranog i kasnog hrasta lužnjaka = The rooting of cuttings of the early and late flushing Slavonian oak , (co-author), 1983
- Četinjače : morfologija i varijabilnost, 1982, 1991 (in English) i 1993
- Genetics of Pinus peuce Gris = Genetik der Pinus peuce Gris = Genetika Pinus peuce Gris , (co-author), 1978
- Genetics of European black pine (Pinus nigra Arn.) , 1974
- Oplemenjivanje ekonomski važnijih vrsta šumskog drveća jugoistočne Slavonije , 1974
- Prilog proučavanju morfološke varijabilnosti spontanih križanaca između alepskog i brucijskog bora, (co-author), 1974

== Sources ==
- (in Croatian) Umro akademik Mirko Vidaković, Vjesnik, 17 August 2002
