= Baldo =

Baldo may refer to:

- Baldo (name), a list of people with the given name or surname
- Baldo (Hector Cantú comic strip), an American comic strip
- Baldo (Italian comics), an Italian comic strip
- Baldo (video game), an action-adventure video game
- Monte Baldo, a mountain range in the Italian Alps
- Alaparma Baldo, an Italian monoplane
- "Baldo", a 16th-century narrative poem written by Teofilo Folengo
- Baldo, a gimmick of wrestler Matt Bloom

== See also ==
- Balto, a sled dog
