= Adi Da artwork =

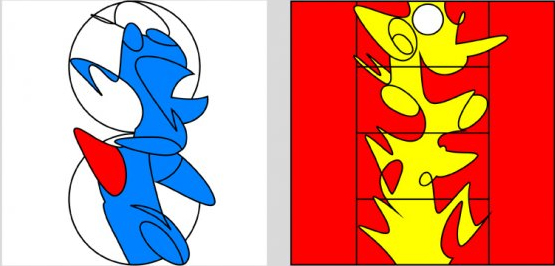
Orpheus and Eurydice (diptych), 2008 Eurydice One: The Illusory Fall of the Bicycle into The Sub-Atomic Parallel Worlds of Primary Color and Point of View Part Three: The Abstract Narrative in Geome and Linead (Second Stage) – L 4 (from Linead One) 2007, 2009 – Lacquer on aluminum, 96 x 198 x 5 inches.

American-born spiritual teacher, writer and artist Adi Da Samraj (1939–2008) focused on creating works of art intended to enable viewers to enter into a "space" beyond limited "points of view". He participated in the 2007 Venice Biennale through an official collateral exhibition, and was later invited to exhibit his work in Florence, Italy, in the 15th century Cenacolo di Ognissanti and the Bargello museum. His work was also shown in New York, Los Angeles, Amsterdam, Miami, and London.

== Background ==
Adi Da graduated from Stanford University in 1963. His master's thesis was "a study of core issues in modernism, focused on Gertrude Stein and the leading painters of the same period".

In the last decade of his life, Adi Da focused on creating works of art intended to enable viewers to enter into a "space" beyond limited "points of view". He described the purpose of his art as "precisely the opposite of the ego-based and ego-idealizing root presumption associated with perspectival image-art". His intention was to lead the viewer away from "the ego's construction of the world". He called the style of his art "Transcendental Realism". The works were primarily photographic, digitally produced large-scale works of pigmented inks on paper or canvas, and monumentally sized works of paint on aluminum.

Later in life, Adi Da became interested in the work of early 20th-century Russian avant-garde artist and art theorist Kazimir Malevich. Adi Da's painting Midnight Sun, a white circle on a black background, contrasts Malevich's Black Square.

Adi Da died at his home in Fiji while working in his art studio.

== Exhibitions ==
In 2007 a selection of Adi Da's works were included in an official collateral exhibition to the Venice Biennale in Italy, curated by art historian Achille Bonito Oliva. The exhibit then moved to Florence. This solo exhibition in Florence was the first to show contemporary art with Renaissance art, juxtaposing Domenico Ghirlandaio's perspectival Last Supper with Adi Da's aperspectival monumental fabrications. The following year his art was displayed at the Cenacolo di Ognissanti, at the exhibit Transcendental Realism: The Art of Adi Da Samraj. Solo exhibitions of his art were held in New York in 2010 and Beverly Hills in 2011. The exhibitions, called Orpheus and Linead, were curated by Achille Bonito Oliva. An exhibit entitled Quandra Loka was held at Gallery Pien Rademakers in Amsterdam in 2013 and 2014.

In July 2015, a solo exhibit of Adi Da's art was held at Bargello National Museum, titled The Ascent of Orpheus: Between and Beyond Representation and Abstraction. It included works from both Orpheus One and Linead One and was only the second time in the museum's 150-year history that it allowed a solo exhibition.

== Reception ==
The Spectra Suites, a book of Adi Da's art, has an introduction by American art historian and critic Donald Kuspit. Kuspit reviewed the work of Adi Da on several occasions, writing:

It is a rare artist who can convey, convincingly, the sense of being face to face with the source of being. Adi Da can clearly live in the depths without succumbing to their pressure, bringing back pearls of art to prove it.

What is perhaps most striking about Adi Da's photographs is their gnostic quality—the intricate movement of light and shadow that gives them their expressive depth and profound intimacy. It is more than a matter of standard chiaroscuro. Adi Da is not simply employing the evocative power of light and shadow, but bringing out their emblematic character. Interweaving them—and in numerous works skeins of light ("the fire of the sun") play over and within shadowy if transparent water ("the water of life")—Adi Da suggests the union of opposites that is the core of mystical experience. Ecstatic experience of their unity brings with it a sense of the immeasurable.

In other examinations of Adi Da's art, Joseph Troncale found that "In his radically non-dual art, Adi Da invites his viewer to drop the blinders of material perception in order to taste an aesthetic ecstasy not dependent on an egoic point of view but liberated from it". Italian art critic Achille Bonito Oliva is noted to have concluded that "the images of Adi Da Samraj restore viewers, wearied by the insensitivity and rationality of a callous technocratic world, to the open disposition of reception and participation in a reality beyond the imagination".
