= Achille Bonito Oliva =

Italian art critic and historian of contemporary art

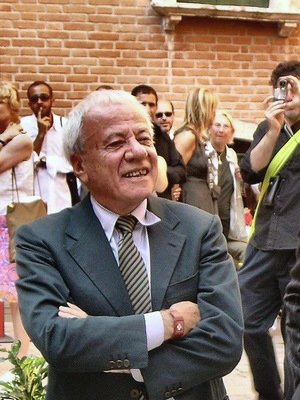
- Born: 1939 (age 86–87); Caggiano, province of Salerno, Italy
- Occupations: art critic, art historian
- Known for: coining the term Transavanguardia

Achille Bonito Oliva (born 1939) is an Italian art critic and historian of contemporary art. Since 1968 he has taught history of contemporary art at La Sapienza, the university of Rome. He has written extensively on contemporary art and contemporary artists. He originated the term Transavanguardia to describe the new direction taken in the late 1970s by artists such as Sandro Chia, Francesco Clemente, Enzo Cucchi, Nicola De Maria and Mimmo Paladino. He has organised or curated numerous contemporary art events and exhibitions; in 1993 he was artistic director of the Biennale di Venezia.

== Life and career ==
Bonito Oliva was born in 1939 in Caggiano, in the province of Salerno, in Campania in southern Italy. He studied law, and then took a degree in letters. He took part in events connected with the avant-garde Gruppo 63 literary movement of the 1960s. From 1968 he taught history of contemporary art at La Sapienza, the university of Rome.

He became active as an art critic, as a writer on history of art – with work on Mannerism, the historic Avant-Garde movements, and the Neo-Avantgarde – and as an organiser and curator of contemporary art events and exhibitions.

In 1979, in an article in Flash Art, he coined the term Transavanguardia to describe the work of artists such as Sandro Chia, Francesco Clemente, Enzo Cucchi, Nicola De Maria and Mimmo Paladino, who – in a manner comparable to that of the Neo-Expressionists and the Neue Wilden – discarded the abstract and conceptual approach of the Neo-Avantgarde and instead returned to figurative painting using the traditional techniques and materials, and at times also the forms and motifs, of the past. Bonito Oliva curated an exhibition of their work at Biennale di Venezia in 1980. He later broadened his definition of the movement to include artists such as Jeff Koons and Julian Schnabel, bringing it closer to the international concept of Postmodernism.

He was the artistic director of the Biennale di Venezia of 1993, and has organised or curated numerous contemporary art events and exhibitions.

== Books ==
Bonito Oliva has written many books, including monographs on Marina Abramović, Francis Bacon, Georg Baselitz, Joseph Beuys, Alighiero Boetti, James Lee Byars, Giorgio de Chirico, Braco Dimitrijević, Marcel Duchamp, Giuseppe Ducrot, Fathi Hassan, Alex Katz, Georgia O'Keeffe, Frida Kahlo, Paul Klee, Nam June Paik, Joan Miró, Pino Pascali, Jackson Pollock, Robert Rauschenberg, Mario Schifano, Nancy Spero, Andy Warhol, Wolf Vostell and Robert Wilson.

=== As author ===
- Made in mater. Bologna: Sampietro, 1967
- Il territorio magico. Comportamenti alternativi dell'arte. Firenze: Centro Di, 1971
- Arte e sistema dell'arte. Opera, pubblico, critica, mercato. Pescara: Galleria Lucrezia De Domizio, 1975
- Disegno. Trasparenza. Pollenza: La nuovo foglio, 1976
- L'ideologia del traditore. Arte, maniera, manierismo. Milano: Feltrinelli, 1976
- Vita di Marcel Duchamp. Roma: Marani, 1976
- Europe/America. The different avant-gardes. Milano: Deco Press, 1976
- Autocritico automobile attraverso le avanguardie. Milano: Il Formichiere, 1977
- Passo dello strabismo. Sulle arti. Milano: Feltrinelli, 1978
- Arcimboldo. Parma: Franco Maria Ricci, 1978
- La Transavanguardia italiana. Milano: Politi, 1980
- Il sogno dell'arte. Tra avanguardia e transavanguardia. Milano: Spirali, 1981
- La Transavanguardia Internazionale. Milano: Politi, 1982
- Manuale di volo. [Dal mito greco all'arte moderna, dalle avanguardie storiche alla transavanguardia]. Milano: Feltrinelli, 1982
- Dialoghi d'artista. Incontri con l'arte contemporanea 1970-1984. Milano: Electa, 1984
- Minori Maniere. Dal Cinquecento alla Transavanguardia. Milano: Feltrinelli, 1985
- Progetto dolce. Nuove forme dell'arte italiana. Milano: Nuova Prearo, 1986
- Antipatia. L'arte contemporanea. Milano: Feltrinelli, 1987
- Superarte. Milano: Politi, 1988
- Il tallone di Achille. Sull'arte contemporanea. Milano: Feltrinelli, 1988
- Arte Lago 90, opere d’arte per la superficie acquatica. [Varese]: Lativa, 1990
- L'arte fino al 2000. Firenze: Sansoni, 1991
- Artae. Milano: Prearo, 1991
- Wolf Vostell, L'Arte e lo Stile Della Conflittualità. Roma: Edizioni Carte Segrete, 1992
- Conversation pieces. Torino: Allemandi, 1993
- La dimora dei corpi gravi. Tributo a Masaccio. Milano: Charta, 1994
- Lezioni di anatomia. Il corpo dell'arte. Roma: Kappa, 1995
- Oggetti di turno. Dall'arte alla critica. Venezia: Marsilio, 1997
- A.B.O.: M.D.. Milano: Costa & Nolan, 1997
- Gratis. A bordo dell'arte. Milano: Skira, 2000
- Fathi Hassan. Milano: Charta, 2000
- L'arte oltre il 2000. Firenze: Sansoni, 2002
- Autocritico automobile. Attraverso le avanguardie. Remake per le nuove generazioni. Latina: Cooper & Castelvecchi, 2002
- I fuochi dello sguardo. Musei che reclamano attenzione. Roma: Gangemi, 2004
- Lezione di boxe. Dieci round sull'arte contemporanea. Roma: Sossella, 2004
- Il bianco e altro e comunque arte. Torino: Umberto Allemandi, 2006
- Claudio Abate, fotografo: installation et performance art. Milano: Photology, 2007
- Baldo Diodato. Opere 1965-2016. Milano: Prearo Editore, 2016

=== As editor ===
- Autonomia e creatività della critica. Cosenza: Lerici, 1980
- Paul Klee. L'annunciazione del segno. Disegni e acquarelli. Milano: G. Mazzotta, 1982
- Avanguardia/Transavanguardia. Milano: Electa, 1982
- Desideretur. Artisti italiani giovanissimi nel Palazzo della Ragione. Bergamo, settembre-ottobre 1985. Roma: Spazio Skema, 1985
- La transavanguardia italiana. Sandro Chia, Francesco Clemente, Enzo Cucchi, Nicola De Maria, Mimmo Paladino. Roma: Drago Arts & Communication, 2003
