= Untitled 92 =

Photograph by Cindy Sherman

Untitled #92 is a color photograph created by Cindy Sherman in 1981. The picture is part of the photographic series Centerfolds, that she created for the magazine Artforum, in 1981, but were never published there.

== History and description ==
Sherman stars as the leading character in all the pictures, created as if for the centerfold of a magazine. She appears in this picture as a frightened young woman, dressed in what seems to be a school uniform, with a pleated skirt, wearing wet short hair, and presenting a deep sense of fear on her eyes, apparently pushed to the floor, her fingers holding her body in position. The menacing context of the picture is left unexplained to the viewer, but seems reminiscent of some of the female characters in Alfred Hitchcock's films, like Janet Leigh in Psycho and Tippi Hedren, in The Birds.

The picture epitomises what critic Roberta Smith wrote on the Centerfolds series: "Sherman makes you understand the components of photography with a particular bluntness which is one of her trademarks. The roles of color, light, cropping, space, eye contact (or lack of it) are continually stated and restated and we read them just as we do details of clothing, hairdo, posture, flooring. Despite all this the effect is not simply didactic; everything is both laid out and convincingly, ingenuously synthesized."

Despite not being published, the Centerfolds series was shown in an exhibition in 1981 to highly critical acclaim and led to Sherman being invited for the documenta 7, in 1982, and the Venice Biennale.

== Art market ==
A print of the photograph was sold by $2,112,000 at 16 May 2007, and another by $2,045,000 at 12 November 2013, both at Christie's, New York.

== Public collections ==
There are prints of the photograph in the Museum of Modern Art, New York, The Art Institute of Chicago, The Broad, Los Angeles, the National Museum of Art, Architecture and Design, Oslo, and the National Gallery of Australia, Canberra.
