= Şükran Moral =

Turkish artist (born 1962)

Şükran Moral (born in 1962 In Terme, Samsun) is a Turkish artist, best known for her performances, videos and installations. During the 80's and 90's, she wrote poetry and worked as a journalist and art critic in Turkey. Moral currently lives and works in Istanbul and Rome.

== Early years ==
Şükran Moral was born in 1962 in Terme, Samsun. She has three brothers and one sister. Her father refused to allow Moral to attend middle school, insisting that she works in a tailors shop. However, with her mother's help, she secretly started attending middle school. Moral graduated from high school despite having to deal with domestic violence and peer pressure.

Moral graduated from the Department of Fine Arts in the Faculty of Education at Ankara University. In 1989, she moved to Italy and studied again at the Accademia di Belle Arti di Roma, where she graduated from the painting section in 1995.

== Artistic career ==
Moral's areas of interest have mostly been the negative effects of religion on women, the mentally ill and disordered and the alienation and exclusion of immigrants, Transsexuals, and Prostitutes.

In 1997, she made a performance at the Museum of Contemporary Art Workshop Sapienza University of Rome, with the title "Museum & Morgue", where she transformed the museum into a morgue. She has performed works at a women's asylum in Istanbul.

One of her most famous works was "Hamam", performed in the men's section of an actual hamam (Turkish bathhouse) in Galatasaray, Istanbul. It was exhibited in 1997 as a part of the International Istanbul Biennial.

"What's scandalous here is not the nudity," she says, "What's scandalous was the fact that here I was, an intellectual woman, who proposes doing something scandalous. If I had really been a whore, it would have been no big deal. Just being a female avant-garde artist is scandalous."

== In Press ==
In 2005, a book about Moral's work, titled Apocalypse, was published by the Italian publisher Gangemi, curated by Simonetta Lux and Patrizia Mania.
