= Olt =

Olt or OLT may refer to:

People:

- Károly Olt (1904–1985), Hungarian politician
- Mike Olt (born 1988), American baseball player

Places:

- Olt County, a county (județ) of Romania
- Olt (river), a river in Romania
  - Olt Defile, a defile that has been cut into the Transyvanian Alps in south-central Romania by the river Olt
- Lot (river), a river in France, formerly called the Olt
- Olton railway station, England (National Rail code: OLT)

In science and technology:

- OLT (mobile network), a former manual mobile telephone network in Norway
- Optical line termination, a piece of telecommunications equipment used for fiber-optic communications
- Orthotopic liver transplant, in medicine
- Overwhelmingly Large Telescope, a proposed optical telescope

Other uses:

- Orangutan Land Trust, a UK charity working for the long-term survival of the orangutan
- OLT, 1969 novel by Kenneth Gangemi
- OLT Express Germany, a German airline
