= Gangemi =

Gangemi is a surname. Notable people with the surname include:

- Daniele Gangemi (born 1980), Italian film director
- Joseph Gangemi, American screenwriter and writer
- Kenneth Gangemi (born 1937), American writer
- Santo Gangemi (born 1961), Vatican diplomat
- Thomas Gangemi (1903–1976), American mayor
- Salvatore Gangemi (1968), American lawyer
