= Elvira Bach =

German painter

- Born: 22 June 1951 (age 73); Neuenhain, Hesse, West Germany
- Education: Berlin University of the Arts
- Spouse: Alioune Bach
- Children: Lamine, Maodo Lô

Elvira Bach (born 22 June 1951) is a postmodernist German painter known for her colourful images of women. A member of the Junge Wilde art movement, she lives and works in Berlin. She is the mother of two children, including basketball player Maodo Lô.

== Biography ==
=== Early life ===
Elvira Bach was born on 22 June 1951 in Neuenhain in Hesse, West Germany. She grew up with her twin sister Ingrid in a rural setting.

=== Life and education ===
From 1967 to 1970, Bach studied at the Erwin-Stein-Schule (state glass vocational school) in Hadamar . Afterwards, she moved to Berlin and studied painting from 1972 to 1979 at the Berlin University of the Arts with "Junge Wilde" or "Neue Wilde" titled painters Rainer Fetting and Salomé. During her studies, she worked at the playhouse Schaubühne in Berlin. In 1981, a scholarship led Elvira Bach to the Dominican Republic to study as an "artist in residence", and was greatly inspired by her experiences there. That same year, she was invited to participate in the "Documenta VII". This was her breakthrough that led to a number of national and international exhibitions of her artwork.

== Collections and exhibitions ==
- 1978: Metzgerei
- 1979: bathtub paintings, SO 36, Berlin
- 1982: documenta 7, Kassel
- 1988: Refigured Painting – The German Image 1969–1988, Guggenheim Museum, New York
- 1990/1991: Mannheimer Kunstverein, Mannheim and Kunsthalle Wilhelmshaven, Wilhelmshaven and Neue Galerie Graz
- 1999: House on the Lützowplatz Berlin
- 2001: Bavarian State Museum in Asbach Abbey
- 2002: Kunsthalle Dominikanerkirche, Osnabrück
- 2004: Kunstverein Salzgitter
- 2006: Kronacher Kunstverein e. V., on the fortress Rosenberg
- 2006: House on the Lützowplatz, Berlin
- 2007: Gallery Noah, Augsburg
- 2009: Stadtgalerie Bad Soden im Taunus; Influences africaines, Frauenmuseum Bonn
- 2010: Museum of European Art (NRW), Nörvenich Castle, near Cologne
- 2011: Galerie Jaeschke, Brunswick
- 2012: Gallery Anne Moerchen, Hamburg
- 2013: Gallery Art350, Istanbul
- 2013: Historic Town Hall, Limburg an der Lahn
- 2015: Museum of Contemporary Art – Diether Kunerth, Ottobeuren
- Current: MoMA in New York, Vancouver Art Gallery, and the Museum of Art in Augsburg

== Style ==
Bach's neo-expressionist portraits of women mirror the themes of her own life, and many of her works unmistakably resemble the artist. She often depicts colorful female portraits that represent many facets of female life, from fragility to sensuality to self-determination.

Bach's works of the early 1980s were mostly self-reflective and focused on herself (Night Owl, Sophisticated Lady, Always Me). However, after her marriage and the birth of her two sons, her art became more representative of her new, more private family environment and home-life. Though Elvira Bach largely focuses on painting, she also works on bronze sculptures, ceramics and Murano glass sculptures.

== See also ==
- List of German painters
