= Porta d'Europa (monument) =

Sculpture in Lampedusa, Italy

- Gateway to Europe (English)
- Artist: Mimmo Paladino
- Completion date: 2008
- Medium: Ceramics and galvanized iron
- Dimensions: 5 m × 3 m (16 ft × 9.8 ft)
- Location: Lampedusa, Italy; 35°29′36″N 12°36′20″E

The Porta d'Europa (English: Gateway to Europe) is a sculpture on the Italian island of Lampedusa dedicated to migrants lost at sea attempting to reach Europe.

== Description ==
The sculpture sits on a rocky crag just southwest of the Lampedusa Airport, near the remains of a World War II bunker. It is in the shape of a doorframe, 5 metres (16 ft) high and 3 metres (9.8 ft) wide. Various decorations on both sides of the door include bas-reliefs of shoes, hats, dishes, and hands. The memorial is constructed from refracting ceramic tiles and galvanized iron. There is no door on the portal, and no barriers around the monument; visitors are free to walk through the opening.

== History ==
The idea for Porta d'Europa was born out of a recognition that no monument existed to migrant deaths in Sicily. Porta is a monument to the thousands of migrants who have died attempting to reach Europe; the island of Lampedusa is the point of entry for 70% of all African migrant sea arrivals to Italy.

The sculpture was commissioned by artist Arnoldo Mosca Mondadori; by AMANI, an Italian NGO; Pietro Veronese, journalist for La Repubblica; and Lampedusano NGO Alternativa Giovani. A tourism company also donated €35,000 towards the construction. The sculpture cost €150,000, and was unveiled in 2008.

Pope Leo XIV visited the monument on 4 July 2026 after praying at a cemetery where migrants are buried. During his visit, the Pope urged European leaders to better address issues that lead to increased migration. He also expressed a desire for migrants to have a better chance at assimilating in their new countries.

=== Reception ===
The monument has been criticized for its "contradictory attempt" to memorialize those who have died attempting to reach Europe, while simultaneously celebrating those who survived. No immigrant artists were consulted during the planning and construction process. Anthropologist Alessandro Corso calls it "a sort of lighthouse visible from the sea." Stefano Muneroni, associate professor of Intercultural Theatre at the University of Alberta, states: "It is an open door that paradoxically is wide shut."
