= Mimmo Paladino =

Italian sculptor, painter and printmaker

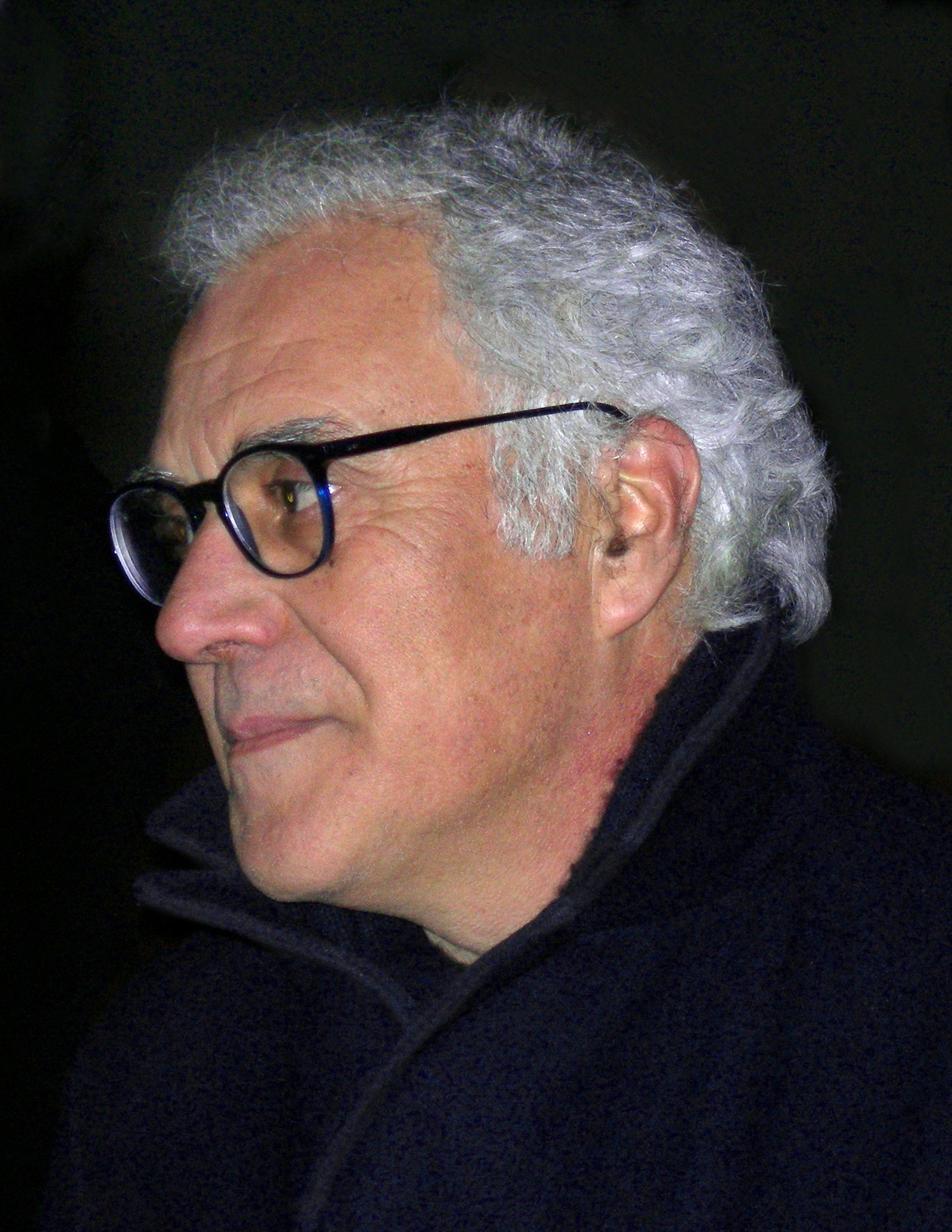
Mimmo Paladino in Vinci, Toscana, 2006

Mimmo Paladino (born in Paduli on 18 December 1948) is an Italian sculptor, painter and printmaker. He is a leading name in the Transvanguardia artistic movement and one of the many European artists to revive Expressionism in the 1980s.

== Biography ==
Paladino was born on 18 December 1948 in Paduli, Campania, but grew up and trained in Benevento, Italy. From 1964 until 1968, he attended Liceo Artistico di Benevento.

He made his debut in 1968 with a solo exhibition at the Galleria Carolina in Portici in Naples. Here he was presented by Achille Bonito Oliva, who was also present for the monographic show at Enzo Cannaviello's Studio Oggetto in Caserta the following year. However, we need to go back to 1964 to find the first major date in his artistic education. This was when, still a schoolboy, he visited the 32nd Venice Biennale and, in particular, the U.S. Pavilion, where he discovered the American Pop artists. In the early 1970s, his approach shifted towards conceptual art and photography, but by the mid-decade his painting had acquired considerable importance and appeared in a manifesto work, Silently, I Am Retiring to Paint a Picture, which was shown in a room in which also the walls were painted. The aim was clearly a return to painting, as the principal place of narration. This was not to recapture the aspirations of the fifties and sixties, which in Italy reflected a painting tradition linked to pre-war artistic research, but rather to make a break with the influences that repudiated painting in the strictest sense, on which he intervened with a series of circular linguistic and semiotic interactions.

In the late seventies, Paladino moved to Milan, where he later taught artistic disciplines at the Liceo school, while also working on his art. In 1977 came his first collaboration with Lucio Amelio, the historic gallery owner in Naples, and two years later he put on his first exhibition with another key gallerist, Emilio Mazzoli of Modena, for whom he made his first book-object – En-De-Re – in 1980. This was indeed another crucial year, for it was when he put on his first solo exhibition in New York (where he had just taken up temporary residence), in two different galleries – those of Maria Goodman and Annina Nosei. International interest in his work and in that of other young Italians was growing, and in 1980 a traveling exhibition took works by Sandro Chia, Francesco Clemente, Sandro Cucchi, Nicola De Maria and Paladino, together with two other artists, Luigi Ontani and Ernesto Tatafiore, to three of the most important museums in Europe. It was also the year of the 39th Venice Biennale, where Harald Szeemann and Achille Bonito Oliva curated the Aperto section, choosing some of the artists who were to make their mark on the art scene for many years to come. It was here that Transavanguardia became more firmly established, with its theoretical structure being published the following year. The arrival of the young Italian painters was seen by many as a breath of fresh air and a key exhibition like Zeitgeist, in Berlin, certainly indicated their progress, with German-speaking countries as the first to promote their work. Paladino's career, like those of his colleagues, has included considerable collaboration with artists, intellectuals and musicians, and yet, more than others, Paladino has always managed to appear with a form of creativity that is inquisitive and open, but always personal. He goes beyond the purely pictorial and, ever since 1983, he has strayed into sculpture (his first work, Closed Garden, is now at Castello di Rivoli) and engraving. However, his basic conception is always pictorial, even when three-dimensional, as in the case of It Will Have No Title, with the use of geometrical elements applied to the environment, the first result of which came in 1995. Painting, sculpture and engraving were the three media that most inspired his style throughout the following years and one might well assume that this is the "eminence" that Danto refers to, since it was clear that – like few other artists of the twentieth century – Paladino always revealed a different ambition in each discipline. In 1988 the critic Giovanni Carandente entrusted him with the main gallery in the Italian Pavilion at the 43rd Venice Biennale. Here Paladino showed an installation in which the management of space – created in part by a pictorial approach to sculpture – was of great impact. This type of approach returned in the early nineties in the Hortus Conclusus in Benevento, a garden in which architecture, the environment and objects all combined to form the work. These creations, which had a mysterious, "alchemical" air about them, emerged like apparitions, as constant epiphanies. This is an aspect that I find constantly in the work of this artist, who in 1994 was the first Italian to exhibit in the Forbidden City in Beijing. Here the views formed a complementary backdrop to the works on show, and this became a constant feature of all his urban projects. The Mountain of Salt dates from 1990. Originally created in Gibellina, it "appeared" in the Piazza del Plebiscito in Naples in 1995 and later, in 2011, in the Piazza del Duomo in Milan, when the city dedicated a major retrospective to him on the piano nobile of the Palazzo Reale. The nineties was a time of great experimentation and it is no coincidence that the Mountain became its symbol. The new millennium, as well as bringing a large number of exhibitions in which he was the protagonist or a guest, also brought the use of video. In 2006 Paladino made his short feature film Quijote, devoted to the work by Cervantes. Presented at the Venice Film Festival, the movie captures the essence of the art of the masterpiece in a highly imaginative series of evocations, sounds and inventions. Great literature is an underlying thread that, over the years, has led him to illustrate the icons of world culture, such as Tristes Tropiques, Ulysses, the Homeric poems, Pinocchio and, of course, Don Quixote. Paladino was back behind the camera in 2013 to film Labyrinthus for the fourth centenary of the death of the madrigal composer Gesualdo da Venosa. Here too, his collaboration with the world of music goes back a long way, with numerous mises en scène for opera houses, the creation of opera posters for Maestro Riccardo Muti and requests for music for his installations, as was the case in 1999 with Brian Eno for Sleepers, in London and then, in 2008, for the Ara Pacis in Rome.

In 2013, Paladino was commissioned to create a monumental installation for Piazza Santa Croce in Florence. The temporary installation incorporated blocks of marble and bronze sculptures and measured approximately 263 × 164 feet, forming a large cross-shaped structure through which members of the public could move. Paladino has exhibited and published his work in various contexts. His practice includes painting, sculpture, public installations, book projects, and museum exhibitions, often combining multiple artistic elements within a single project. His work was also presented at the 55th Venice Biennale in 2015.

Paladino was made an honorary member of the Royal Academy of Arts, London on 26 May 1999.

His work is in many public museum collections including the Metropolitan Museum of Art, Tate, Museum of Modern Art, among others.

== Personal life ==
Mimmo Paladino is married to Imma, and has one daughter and three grandchildren. He now lives in Rome and Milan, and Paduli but still has a studio in the little town near Benevento.

== Timeline ==
1948 Born 18 December in Paduli, near Benevento, east of Naples

1964 Visits the Venice Biennale where the work of Robert Rauschenberg in the American Pavilion makes a strong impression, revealing to him the 'reality of art'

1968 Completes his studies at the Liceo artistico di Benevento and within a year has participated in a group show in Naples. His early work uses photo-based imagery as well as showing an awareness of conceptual art: '…what I was really looking for was images. The frozen art, made with such a cold medium as the camera, certainly didn't come naturally, and above all, I couldn't have kept on making art along such a one-way track that excluded new possibilities'

Solo exhibition at the Galleria Carolina, Portici

1969 Solo exhibition at Enzo Cannaviello's Studio Oggetto, Caserta

1973 Begins combining images in mixed media, building up a complex iconography that takes account of 'a terrible mixture of messages from cultures, strangely opposed and divergent, though mixed together'

1977 Paints a seminal work that marks a shift towards painting at odds with current avant-garde practice: 'I have always thought of my work as something which is on a borderline with risk. Even my first painting with an image came out in a moment when something of this kind was totally outside the idea of painting; and the title, not by chance, was Silence, I am retiring to paint a picture'

Shows a large mural in tempera with Galleria Lucio Amelio in Naples

The same year he moves to Milan

1978 First visit to New York

1980 Invited by the Neapolitan critic Achille Bonito Oliva to show in the Aperto section of the Venice Biennale, together with Sandro Chia, Francesco Clemente, Enzo Cucchi, and Nicola De Maria.

Publication of the book-object EN DE RE in collaboration with Bonito Oliva (Emilio Mazzoli, Modena)

Begins experimenting with etching, aquatint, lino-cuts and xylography

1981 Participates in A New Spirit in Painting at the Royal Academy of Arts, London, a major exhibition that is shown the following year at the Martin-Gropius-Bau, Berlin, under the title Zeitgeist

A major solo exhibition of drawings from the previous five years is organised by the Kunstmuseum, Basel. It travels to the Kestner-Gesellschaft, Hannover, the Mannheimer Kunstverein, Mannheim, and the Groninger Museum, Groningen, and launches Paladino as an international artistWorks on the first of four projects with the New York printmakers Harlan & Weaver

1982 Participates in the Sydney Biennale and in Documenta 7, Kassel

Realises his first sculpture in bronze, Giardino chiuso

Makes the first of numerous visits to Brazil where his father is living

1984 Builds a house and studio in Paduli, near Benevento. From now on, divides his time between Paduli and his apartment in Milan

Shows five recent works at the Newport Harbor Museum as part of Il Modo Italiano, a survey of recent Italian art organized by the Los Angeles Institute of Contemporary Art and held in several venues

1985 First retrospective exhibition is held at the Städtische Galerie im Lenbachhaus, Munich.

Realises the Pietre, the first of several series of standing figures in white stone

1988 The Italian pavilion at the Venice Biennale devotes a large central space to a massive sculptural work consisting of enigmatic graphic symbols attached to the walls and a group of bronze figures

1989 Designs a Swatch watch which is produced in an edition of 100. 'The idea was not to decorate a watch, but to design time. My Swatch is like a humorous vanitas, a poetic symbol of passing time that was industrially manufactured'

1990 Commissioned by the theatre director Elio De Capitani to create a set for an open-air performance of the opera La sposa di Messina, based on Friedrich Schiller's tragic drama, and staged at Gibellina in Sicily as part of the Orestiadi festival. Paladino devises a sculpture-environment to be seen by moonlight. It consists of a Zen garden made of raked gravel dominated by a 15-metre-high (49 ft) mountain of salt from which emerge the charred forms of 30 wooden horses

1991 A major exhibition opens in Prague at the Belvedere, the royal castle that has been restored for the occasion; shows a cycle of seven new canvases inspired by the history of Prague, nine bronze torsos and works on paper. A sculpture of a fallen horse exhibited in a nearby piazza is removed after objections by a local bishop.

Completes a new cycle of twelve paintings on wood, Il respiro della bellezza. 'I've always painted as though the canvas itself were a living organism, to create a living, curious, palpitating thing. When I was applying a brushstroke to one of these works, I realised that this gesture was like breathing, like the panting of a man'

1992 Opening of Hortus Conclusus, a permanent sculpture installation for the Chiostro di San Domenico at Benevento: 'I liked the idea of a Hortus conclusus as a place for looking at and contemplating the work of art …outside the constraints of the art gallery'

The Galleria Civica d'Arte Contemporanea in Trento holds a major exhibition of prints produced between 1970 and 1992

1993 Responds to the assassinations of two judges by the Sicilian Mafia, which also caused the deaths of many others, by painting seven large pictures 'like a chorus, a requiem, which I then covered up with a coat of limestone wash (the same material used to bury the dead)'

Major solo exhibition at Forte Belvedere, Florence

1994 Invited to exhibit in Beijing, the first contemporary Italian artist to be shown there.

Works in Bologna

Publishes Ulysses, 16 June 1904, 21 unnumbered etchings based on James Joyce's novel

1995 Participates in Reparations, an exhibition of contemporary art held in the Sala delle Reali Poste in the west wing of the Uffizi to mark its restoration after that part of the building had been almost completely destroyed in a car-bomb blast in May 1993

1995–1996 Major solo exhibition in Naples, which is shown in three venues: the Scuderie di Palazzo Reale, the Piazza del Plebiscito and the Villa Pignatelli. Paladino's reconstruction of the Montagna di sale erected in the Piazza del Plebiscito is seen as a provocation and is vandalised early in the New Year

1998 Publishes Film, a collection of 32 drawings (Squadro edizioni grafiche, Bologna)

1999 A major exhibition at the South London Gallery includes Testimoni, a recently completed group of 20 standing figures in white Vicenza stone, and Zenith, a series of mixed-media works on aluminium.

Creates, as part of South London Gallery Projects, an installation I Dormienti in the brick-vaulted undercroft of the Roundhouse at Chalk Farm which is accompanied by a score written by Brian Eno.

An exhibition of new prints opens at the Alan Cristea Gallery.

Made an honorary member of the Royal Academy of Arts, London

2000 His design for the set of Oedipus Rex at the Teatro Argentina, Rome, directed by Mario Martone, wins the UBU prize for stage design

2001 Illustrates Homer's Iliad and Odyssey, published in two volumes by Casa editrice Le Lettere, Florence

Publication of catalogue raisonné of graphic works 1974–2001, ed. Enzo Di Martino (Art of this Century, New York/Paris)

2002–2003 Major retrospective held at the Centro per l'Arte Contemporanea Luigi Pecci, Prato

Represented together with Sandro Chia, Francesco Clemente, Enzo Cucchi and Nicola de Maria in Transavanguardia 1979-1985 at Castello Di Rivoli, Museo d'Arte Contemporanea, Turin

2003 Zenith installed in the square of the European Parliament headquarters

2004 Works made in close collaboration with Sol Lewitt are displayed at the Galleria Nazionale d'Arte in Rome

As part of the project Terrae Motus, has a solo show at the Reggia di Caserta

2004–2005 Touring Pinocchio exhibition is held at the modern art museums of six Japanese cities and at the eighteenth-century Scola dei Battioro in Venice

2005 Mimmo Paladino in Scena opens at the Loggetta Lombardesca in Ravenna.

Statue Zenith exhibited at EXPO 2005 in Aichi, Japan

An exhibition dedicated to the theme of Don Quixote by Cervantes opens in December at the Museo di Capodimonte, Naple

2006 Porta con Figura exhibited at the New Art Centre Sculpture Park and Gallery at Roche Court, Salisbury

Commissioned to re-design the Piazza dei Guidi at the new home of the Museo Leonardiano in Vinci

2008 Unveiling of Porta d'Europa in Lampedusa

2009 Paladino: Sculpture 1980-2008, written by Enzo Di Martino and Friedhelm Mennekes published by Skira

2011 Montagna del Sale ('Mountain of Salt') installed in the Piazza del Duomo in Milan, as part of the celebrations to mark the anniversary of the unification of Italy. The installation has a diameter of 30 meters and a height of 20 meters

Shortlisted for The Royal Academy of Arts, London Wollaston Award

2013 Exhibition in summer during the international Ravello Festival

2015 Again at the Venice Biennale with a great installation

2016 An important retrospective at the Galleria Christian Stein, Milan.

2016 Mimmo Paladino: Present into Past sculpture exhibition at Frederik Meijer Gardens and Sculpture Park, Grand Rapids, USA

Paladino currently lives and works in Milan, Rome, Paduli.

1 A. Danto, "Mimmo Paladino. Transavanguardia to Meridionalism", in F. Arensi, Paladino Palazzo Reale, exhibition catalogue, 2011, Giunti Editore, p. 35.

== See also ==
- The Sound of Night (1986), a sculpture in Houston, Texas

== Bibliography ==
- Flavio Arensi, "Paladino at Palazzo Reale", with essays by Arthur Danto and Germano Celant, Firenze, Giunti, 2011
- Enzo Di Martino and Klaus Albrecht Schröder, Mimmo Paladino, Graphic Work 1974-2001, New York, Rizzoli International Publications, 2002.
- Giancarlo Politi, Paladino: Lo Specchio, Milan, Politi Editore, 1992.
- Margaret Failoni, Mimmo Paladino, Kyoto, Japan, Kyoto Shoin, 1990.
- Giovanni Testori, Mimmo Paladino, Brussels, Artiscope, 1989.
