= Baldo Diodato =

Italian artist (born 1938)

Baldo Diodato (born 1938 in Naples, Italy) is an Italian artist known for his significant contributions to contemporary art. He is recognized for his innovative use of materials such as plaster and metal to capture the textures and forms of urban environments. He participated in numerous exhibitions in Europe and the United States, where he investigated themes of perception, memory, and the interaction between the viewer and the artwork.

== Early Work and Influences ==
Diodato studied at the Accademia di Belle Arti in Turin and later at the Accademia di Belle Arti in Naples, where he focused on sculpture under the guidance of Emilio Greco and Augusto Perez.

His artistic career began in the 1960s, marked by his initial exploration of material-based sculptures. His early works showcased an innovative use of wire and fabric, positioning him within the contemporary art movement and drawing connections to prominent artists like Alberto Giacometti and Alexander Calder. He established his presence in the art world after collaboration with Modern Art Agency of Lucio Amelio in Naples which hosted a solo exhibition of his work in 1967 with the installation Due cubi scompobili.

He actively participated in the cultural debate surrounding Neapolitan sculpture, engaging with the neodadaist movements represented by the magazine Linea Sud, founded in 1963 and directed by Luigi Castellano. He co-founded „Operativo Sud 64", with Antonio Dentale, Gian Battista Nazzaro, Ray Pattison, Giovanni Battista Del Pozzo, Felice Piemontese and Achille Bonito Oliva as the group's theorist.

== United States Period ==
In 1966, he moved to the United States, where he lived and worked until 1992. In New York City he found new aesthetic references that allowed him to explore a variety of techniques and materials. He engaged with conceptual and performance art, broadening his thematic exploration and pushing the boundaries of traditional sculpture. In Love Park, Philadelphia, he sets up a six-by-six-meter canvas and allowed people to walk over it for hours. The canvas became a unique and collective record, capturing the ephemeral traces of everyday movements, transforming an ordinary moment into something both extraordinary and unrepeatable.

== Return to Italy and Evolution of Work ==
After returning to Italy in 1992, Diodato's work evolved to merge his European heritage with the avant-garde influences he encountered in New York. His later career is characterized by large-scale public installations, where he uses materials such as metal and aluminum to create intricate bas-relief imprints.

To this day, canvas, copper, and aluminum remain integral to Baldo Diodato's artistic exploration. He investigates a system of spatial relationships, highlighting the significance of temporality while showcasing the intrinsic value of form.
