= Transavantgarde =

Art movement in Italy

Transavantgarde or Transavanguardia is the Italian version of Neo-expressionism, an art movement that swept through Italy and the rest of Western Europe in the late 1970s and 1980s. The term transavanguardia was coined by Italian art critic Achille Bonito Oliva, originating in the "Aperto '80" at the Venice Biennale, and literally means beyond the avant-garde.

This art movement responded to the explosion of conceptual art, which found many mediums of expression, by reviving painting and reintroducing emotion – especially joy – back into drawing, painting and sculpture. Transavantgarde marked a return to figurative art, as well as mythic imagery, which was rediscovered during the height of the movement. The artists revived figurative art and symbolism, which were less frequently used in movements after World War II like minimalism. The principal transavantgarde artists were Sandro Chia, Francesco Clemente, Enzo Cucchi, Mimmo Germanà, Nino Longobardi, Nicola De Maria and Mimmo Paladino.

In 1982, works by Chia, Cucchi and Longobardi were included in the exhibition "Italian Art Now: An American Perspective" at the Solomon R. Guggenheim Museum in New York.
