= Luigi Ontani =

Italian painter, photographer and sculptor (born 1943)

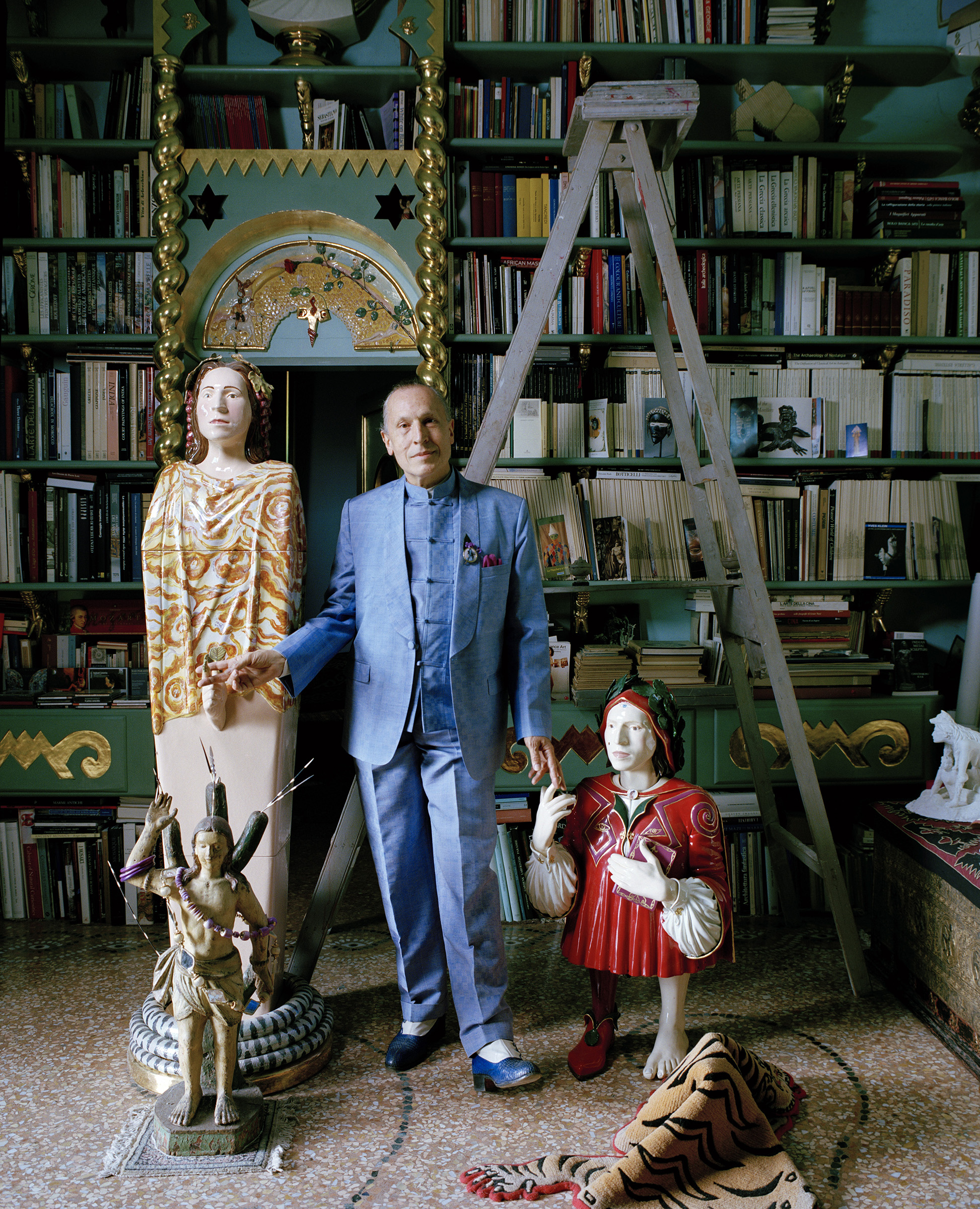
- Luigi Ontani photographed by Oliver Mark, Riola di Vergato 2011
- Born: 24 November 1943 (age 82); Grizzana Morandi, Bologna
- Known for: painting, sculpture

Luigi Ontani (Grizzana Morandi, 24 November 1943) is an Italian multidisciplinary artist, known as a painter, photographer and sculptor.

== Early life and education ==
Luigi Ontani was born 24 November 1943 in Grizzana Morandi, Italy. Ontani studied at the Academy of Fine Arts of Bologna.

Ontani began his artistic career in the 1970s when he became known for his tableau vivants: photographed and videotaped performances in which he presented himself in different ways: from Pinocchio to Dante, Saint Sebastian to Bacchus. These displays of "actionism" (different from Viennese Actionism, to which Hermann Nitsch is associated) verge on kitsch and raise personal narcissism to a higher level.

== Career ==
Throughout his long career Ontani has expressed his creativity and poetics through the use of many different techniques: from his "oggetti pleonastici" (1965–1969), made in plaster, to the "stanza delle similitudini," made with objects cut in corrugated fiberboard. He has often anticipated the use of techniques subsequently adopted by other artists: his first Super 8 films were made between 1969 and 1972.

With his work "Ange Infidele" (1968) Ontani begins to experiment with photography. From the beginning his photography has been characterized by some particular elements: the subject is always the artist himself, who uses his own body and face to personify historic, mythological, literary and popular themes; the chosen formats are usually miniature and gigantography, and each work is considered unique. From the late 1960s on are "Teofania" (1969), "San Sebastiano nel bosco di Calvenzano, d'apres Guido Reni" Tentazione," "Meditazione, d'apres de la Tour," "Bacchino" (1970), "Tell il Giovane," "Raffaello," "Dante," " Pinocchio" (1972), "Lapsus Lupus," the diptych "EvAdamo" (1973), "Leda e il Cigno" (1974), "I grilli e i tappeti volanti" that will be followed by other "d'apres," and the first Indian cycle "En route vers l'Inde, d'apres Pierre Lotti." His first artistic photography has a historic importance because it anticipates a phenomenon that will be widespread and popular from the 1980s.

While working on his photographs Ontani began to make his first tableaux vivants. From 1969 to 1989 the artist made around 30 of these exhibitions, again foreshadowing the so-called interactive installations, which are based on the mixture of various technologies. With this same attitude he has created works in papier-mâché, glass, wood (he has made numerous masks, especially on Bali, with Pule wood) and, more rarely, in bronze, marble, and fabric. He has also made notorious works in ceramic, thanks to the cooperation with Bottega Gatti of Faenza, Venera Finocchiaro in Rome, and the Terraviva laboratory of Vietri: some of them are his "pineal" masks, the "Ermestetiche," and the last great works such as "GaneshaMusa" and "NapoleonCentaurOntano."

Ontani has not used all these different techniques as ends in themselves but as occasions to experiment new possibilities and formulate new variations of the themes and subjects that interest him the most: his own "transhistoric" travel through myth, the mask, the symbol and iconographic representation. He has exhibited his works in some of the most important museums and galleries of the world, from the Solomon R. Guggenheim Museum to the Pompidou Centre, the Museo Reina Sofía to the Frankfurter Kunstverein. He has also participated in several editions of the Venice, Sydney, and Lyon biennales. Recently he has had four important retrospectives at the MoMA (2001), the SMAK in Ghent (2003–2004), the MAMbo in Bologna (2008), and the Accademia di San Luca, also called the Accademia Nazionale di San Luca, in Rome (2017). The retrospective in Rome marks his receiving the Premio Presidente della Repubblica award in 2015.

In 1982, Ontani's work was featured in the exhibition, "Italian Art Now: An American Perspective" at the Solomon R. Guggenheim Museum, alongside other Italian artists, Sandro Chia, Enzo Cucchi, Gilberto Zorio, Giuseppe Penone, Nino Longobardi, and Vettor Pisani.

Ontani's work was credited on Bjork's album Volta as the inspiration for the costume that she can be seen wearing on the album's cover photo.

== Group exhibitions ==
- Venice Biennale (1972,1978,1984,1995)
- Pompidou Centre, Paris: "Identité italienne: Art en Italie depuis 1959" (1981)
- Solomon R. Guggenheim Museum, New York City: "Italian Art Now: An American Perspective" (1982)
- Frankfurter Kunstverein: "1960-1985 Aspekte der Italienischen Kunst" (1986)
- VI Sydney Biennale (1986)
- Museo Reina Sofía, Madrid: "La otra escultura. Treinta años de escultura italiana" (1990)
- VII New Delhi Triennale (1991)

== Solo exhibitions ==
- Galleria San Petronio, Bologna: "Luigi Ontani" (1967)
- Galleria Lucio Amelio, Naples y L'Attico, Rome (1974)
- De Appel Foundation, Amsterdam (1975)
- Sonnabend gallery, Paris, New York (1976, 1977)
- The kitchen center for Video Music and performance, New York (1979)
- 121 art gallery, Antwerp: "Ontani's Mask" (1983)
- Galleria dello Scudo, Verona: "Idea Aida del vero diffida" (1995)
- Frankfurter Kunstverein, Frankfurt: Luigi Ontani (1996)
- Sperone-westwater, New York: "Ermestetiche" (1997)
- MoMA, New York: "GaneshamUSA 1965-2001"(2001)
- Bangkok National Gallery, Bangkok: "AlnusThaiAurea" (2002)
- Kunsthalle, Vienna: Le martyre de San Sebastien (2003)
- SMAK, Ghent: "Genthara: Luigi Ontani" (2004)
- MAMBO, Bologna: "Gigante3RazzEtà7ArtiCentAuro" (2008)
- "SanLuCastoMalinIconicoAttoniTonicoEstaEstE'tico," Accademia Nazionale di San Luca, Rome (2017)
