= Baldo De' Serofini =

Italian painter (fl. 1490–1520)

Baldo De' Serofini (fl. 1490–1520) was an Italian painter of the Renaissance period, active in the Marche and Umbria regions.

Little is known of his biography. He is said to have been born in Perugia. He painted at least two canvases depicting a Madonna del Soccorso, one found in the Pinacoteca Civica Marco Moretti in Civitanova Marche, and the other for the Museo-Pinacoteca di Palazzo Lazzarini in Morrovalle in the Marche.

Baldo painted a Madonna and Child with Angels for the church of Santa Chiara in Cagli. He painted another Madonna with Child, which is now displayed at the Palazzo Bonacolsi in Mantua. It was originally displayed at the Church of San Giovanni Battista Decollato in Macerata. Another one of Baldo's paintings was the Madonna del Soccorso and the Blessed Placido and Bartolomeo, attributed to him by Italian art historian Federico Zeri. It is preserved at the Church of the Blessed Placido in Recanati. Baldo also painted devotional works, which are now displayed at the Galleria Nazionale delle Marche in Urbino.
