= Baldo Santana =

Spanish footballer

Personal information
- Full name: Baldomero Santana Martínez
- Date of birth: 25 May 1995 (age 31)
- Place of birth: Alicante, Spain
- Height: 1.84 m (6 ft 1/2 in)
- Positions: Centre back; right back

Team information
- Current team: Toledo B

Youth career
- 2002–2003: El Cabo
- 2003–2007: Alicante
- 2007–2009: Hércules
- 2009–2011: Valencia
- 2011–2014: Hércules

Senior career*
Years	Team	Apps	(Gls)
2013–2016	Hércules	4	(0)
2015–2016	Hércules B	30	(1)
2016–	Toledo B	33	(1)
- * Club domestic league appearances and goals as of 14 May 2017

Baldo Santana Martínez (born 25 May 1995) is a Spanish footballer who plays for CD Toledo B. Mainly a central defender, he can also play as a right back.

== Club career ==
Born in Alicante, Baldo joined Hércules CF's youth setup in 2007, after starting it out at local clubs CD El Cabo and Alicante CF. In the 2009 summer he moved to Valencia CF, being assigned to the youth squads, but moved back to the Blanquiazules two years later.

On 17 August 2013, while still a junior, Baldo played his first match as a professional, coming on as a late substitute for Gai Assulin in a 1–1 home draw against Real Zaragoza. On 12 July of the following year he signed a two-year deal with the club, being definitely promoted to the main squad now in Segunda División B.
