= Gilberto Zorio =

Italian artist

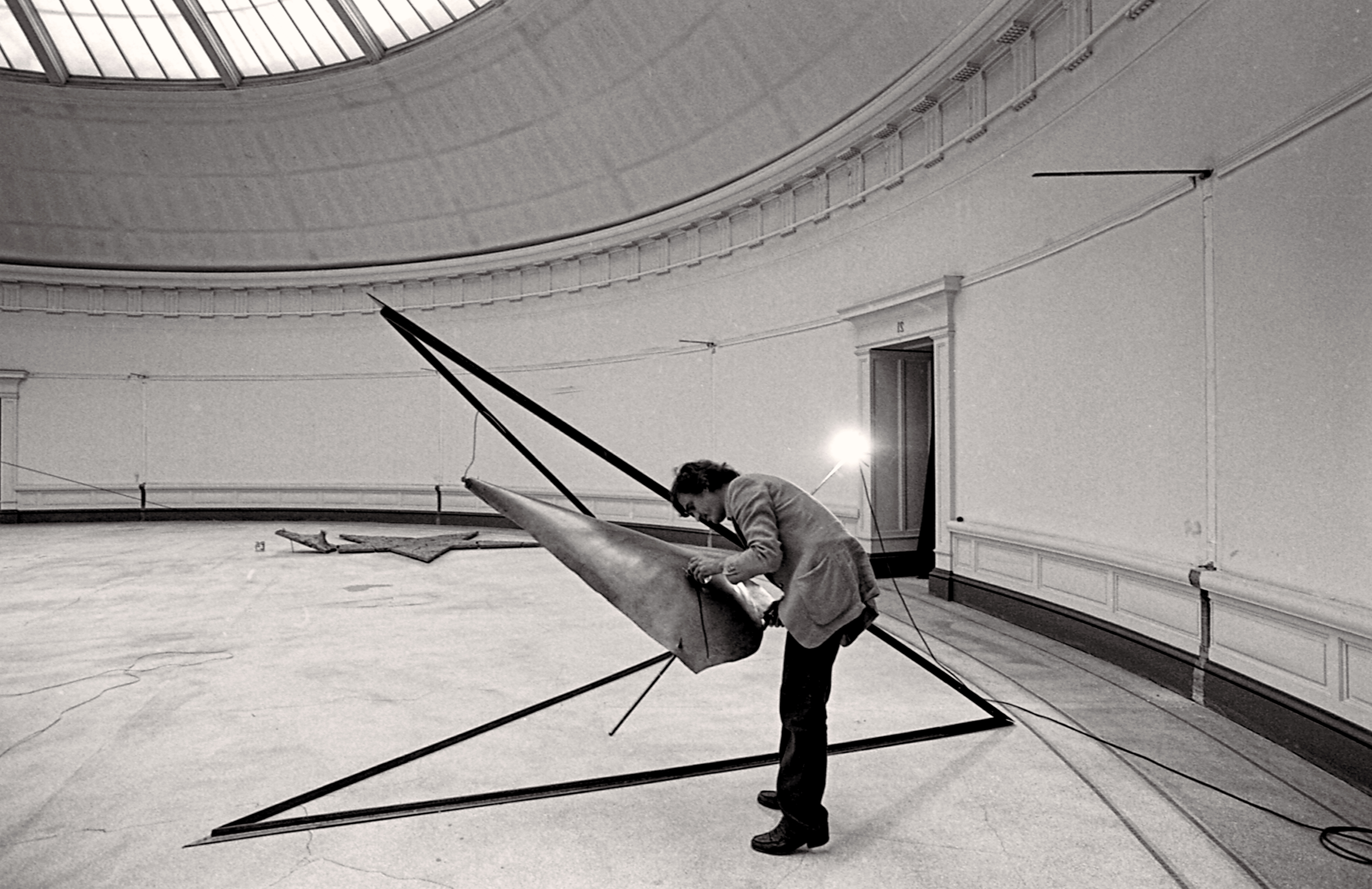
- Gilberto Zorio in the Museum of Fine Arts, Ghent in 1980
- Born: 1944 (age 81–82); Andorno Micca, Kingdom of Italy
- Known for: Visual art
- Notable work: Scrittura bruciata (Burnt writing), Torcia (Torch), Tenda (Tent), Odio (Hate), Confine incandescente (Incandescent border), Rose-Blu-Rosa (Pink-Blue-Pink)
- Movement: Arte Povera

Gilberto Zorio (born 1944 in Andorno Micca) is an Italian artist associated with the Italian Arte Povera movement. Zorio's artwork shows his fascination with natural processes, alchemical transformation, and the release of energy. His sculptures, paintings, and performances are often read as metaphors for revolutionary human action, transformation, and creativity. He is known for his use of materials including: incandescent electric light tubes, steel, pitch, motifs, and processes through the use of evaporation and oxidation. He also creates precarious installations using fragile materials such as Stella di Bronzo and Acidi within his work.

== Education ==
Zorio studied at the Scuola di arte e di ceramica (School of Arts and Ceramics) and then the Academy of Fine Arts in Turin (1963-1970). Zorio originally studied painting, but he soon moved on to sculpture and had his first solo show of three-dimensional works in 1967 at the Galleria Sperone, Turin. He continued to live there and teach after he graduated.

== Early work ==
A lot of Zorio's early work tended toward that which the North American artist Robert Morris identified as a 'dedifferentiation' between the materials and forms of art in post minimalist sculptural practice. This led to Zorio presenting objects that asserted dynamic relationships with their materials and spatial or environmental context. This can be seen in Zorio's semi-cylinder of cobalt chloride, which changed color in reaction to the spectator's presence.

Throughout his career, Zorio was influenced by Michelangelo Pistoletto, Piero Gilardi, and Mario Merz.

Zorio's early pieces done between 1966 and 1968 concretized energy processes. These works utilized the process of chemical reactions or simple physical actions (such as oxidation, evaporation, refining, or electric transmission). These early works are based on autonomous changes taking place within a given system, or on changes caused by outside intervention (e.g., by the viewer). These events and changes take place within the work occurring at a slow pace, turning the weight and impact of time and the relentless rhythm of nature into something tangible. Energy, both on the physical-chemical and emotional level, is common to all these processes. These concepts can be seen in pieces such as: Rosa-blu-rosa, Tenda, Piombi, Senza titolo, 1967 and Senza titolo, 1968.

== Role in Arte Povera ==
Since his first exhibition at the Galleria Sperone in Turin in 1967, Gilberto Zorio's work has been linked to the history of Arte Povera. These first productions were strange objects, which were results of completed actions or ones that are still under way. Next came his work involving the action and reaction of the artist's body like in Odio ("hate" in Italian), a word inscribed with an ax in a wall. The role of words and speech is essential in these pieces.

Zorio participated in the famous exhibition When Attitudes Become Form (1969), organized by Harald Szeemann in Bern. There Zorio presented Torcia, a radical piece where flaming torches, suspended above the ground, fall causing the collapse and destruction of the work itself. In 1969 he also exhibited in Paris for the first time along with New York for the event "Nine at Castelli" where, with Giovanni Anselmo, they were the only European artists, faced with artists of Process Art, Antiform and Post-minimal artists.

Later in life, Zorio commented on the beginning of the Arte Povera movement and his role, with the other artists of the Arte Povera movement, that "leaving the box or leaving the framework, acting outside the framework, I don't know whether that was understood as a gesture of liberty, of freedom, whether we were understood as a force saying 'Here we are, we are ready to enter into dialog' I think a lot has to do with perception of the other and what happens around the perception of the other.”

Zorio has stated that his belief in art is that “It can’t be masked or disguised, and I think I can say that of the work of so many artists, it can't be masked or hidden or disguised. And that I think is a very positive fact, I mean you can physically destroy a work of art, you can try and affect its intrinsic strength as a result of the context in which it exists, but I don't think you can actually change it."

== Themes ==
=== Alchemy ===
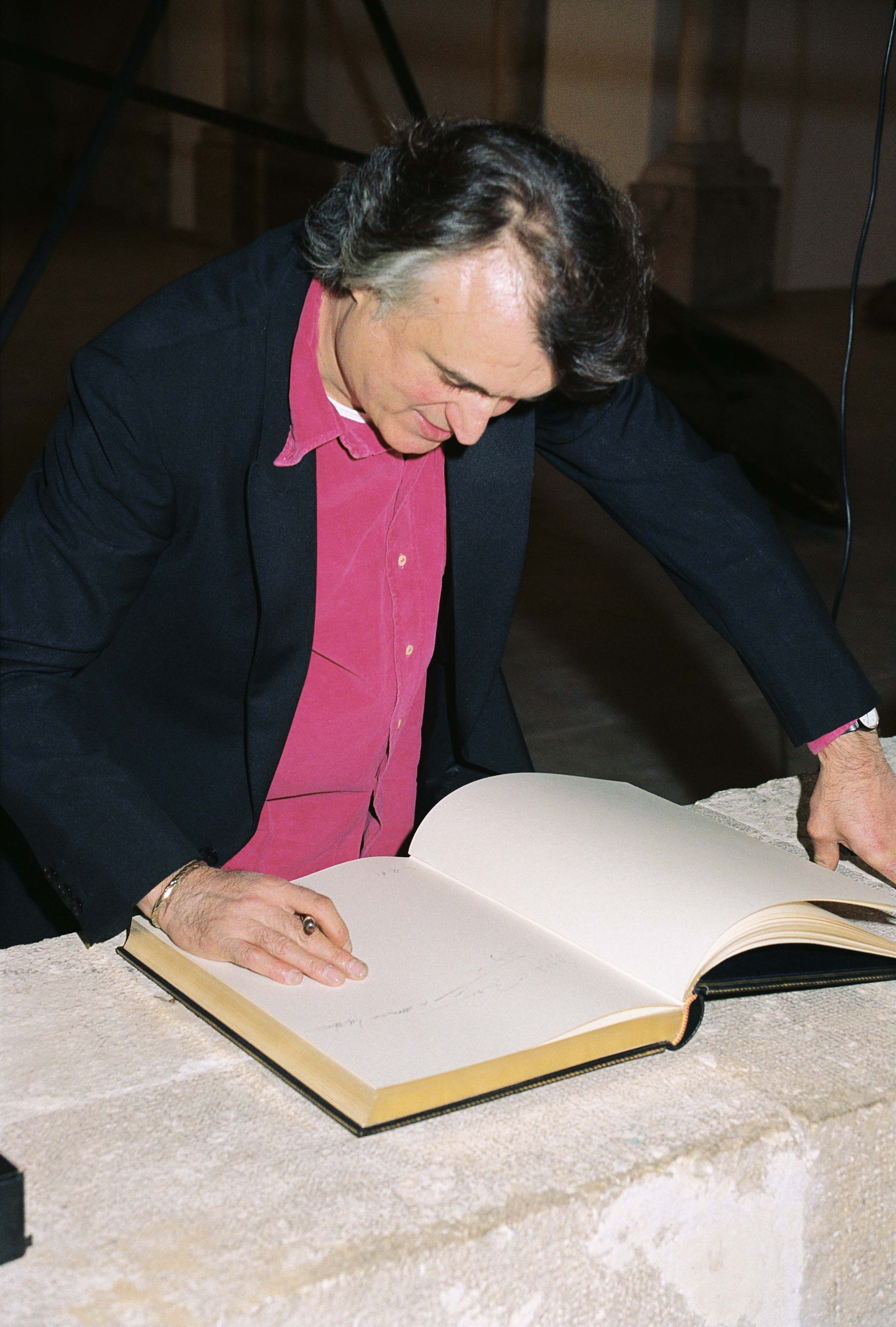
Gilberto Zorio, at IVAM, 1991.

Like many of the artists of the expanded Arte Povera movement, Zorio professed faith in and practiced alchemy. This added to the reasons why Zorio identified with the luck-bringing five pointed pentagram, which is the symbol of Venus. Many of his pieces were influenced by this belief and influenced his choice in materials. An example of this is found in his pieces using mine lamps. One can interpret the lamp as a symbol for the enlightenment of the spirit.

=== Stella ===
Stars are a recurring theme in Gilberto's work. It became an obsession and he saw it as a part of the public imagination. He described his processes in these works by stating "I have done nothing more than make it, drag it in, and make use of it in favor I know not what of, though I hope and believe in favor of a need for energy and amazement."

=== Canoe ===
Zorio has worked with the idea of canoes throughout his career. He created these using assorted materials such as pitch or steel. He describes a canoe as "A javelin of water, it is desire and dream, forward motion, the idea of effort, conquest, new landfalls."

=== Giavellotti ===
Javelins are a recurring theme in Zorio's work. He used javelins as stand-alone objects and has also used them to work into other the themes. An example of this can be found in Zorio's piece titled Stella di giavellotti (Star of javelins). According to Zorio, the javelin is an instrument whose "design has been perfected through the millennia (and has) reached absolute beauty."

== Works ==
=== Tenda (1967) ===
Zorio's Tenda is a work that plays with the laws of physics and chance. Zorio took a green cloth, which was soaked in salt water, draped it over a metal scaffolding, and clamped it in place. The salt water ran through the cloth and onto the ground, where it evaporated, leaving traces of salt on the cloth. This was shown at Sperone gallery, Turin, in Zorio's solo show in 1967. It was shown again in 'Con temp l'azione', in Turin in 1967.

=== Colonna (1967) ===
Zorio created Colonna (Column). This piece is a simple column made of asbestos that crushes a rubber tube. Zorio created three works with the same materials and dimensions that have been realized with the same title.

Zorio commented on this piece saying, “Rubber is a plant material, it becomes very hard with this cement that runs over it and it doesn’t touch the ground, in a terrifying balance, where the air chamber supports the overturned capital pipe. It is as if the breath were missing from a historic being, one might speak of feelings, of forces and relationships between present and past, but interpretations risk missing the mark."

=== Rosa-blu-rosa (1967) ===
For Rosa-blu-rosa (Pink-blue-pink) Zorio created a half-cylinder of asbestos cement that contains a mixture of cobalt chloride. This causes it to change color from pink to blue in relation to changes in atmospheric humidity. A defining feature of this work is, therefore, the contrast between its elemental form and its instability, including the static structure and its ability to change, identifying not in a state of quiet, but in an energetic process in perpetual transformation, thanks to which, the time becomes a constitutive element of the work.

Germano Celant, an Italian art historian, critic, and curator, commented on this piece saying, "Thus this involves a time system that reacts to the changes that concern it, and its formal equilibrium, in the absence of an optimal or quiet state, is changed by external intervention; to experience the work, the viewer must be present, since it is his or her presence that necessarily transforms the appearance of the work. The change of color is not dictated by aesthetic principles, but by an extra-artistic element."

=== Senza titolo (1968) ===
Zorio's Senza titolo (untitled) is a performative sculpture. Zorio took a bowl and filled it with a mix of bright yellow sulphur powder and iron powder. In the bowl of powder is a magnetic handle. As the participant drags the handle along the powder, it picks up the black iron powder thus creating black marks across the surface. Eventually the handle loses its magnetic pull and the iron will start falling back into the sulphur mixture.

=== Senza titolo (1969) ===
Zorio's Senza titolo (untitled) is a piece created out of bamboo branches, bonfire, Pyrex pot, and cement bricks. A bundle of bamboo sticks are suspended 40 cm above the floor. Below this, Zorio built a small fire between two cement blocks, on which he balanced an upturned Pyrex dish. When talking about this piece, Zorio comments that “In my work... I see and proceed... with discontinuous movements; it is a way of acting and reflecting that takes into account senses of time and impulses that are at times very short while at other highly extended; it is a kind of exploration in which, sometimes, I am surprised to discover the remains of an old campsite of mine... It would be enough to light the fire again."

=== Scrittura bruciata (1968-69) ===
Zorio's Scrittura bruciata (Burnt writing) is one of the sculptures which he used as part of a performance, as well as a stand-alone piece. A heated copper plate was placed inside a rectangular wire cage. A sheet of copper was attached to one side of the cage to make a ledge where Zorio placed a sheet of paper and a pen with invisible ink on top of it. Zorio wrote messages on the paper in invisible ink and dropped the page onto the hot plate where the words became visible for a few seconds until the paper burnt up. It was first exhibited at Sonnabend Gallery, Paris, 1969, and was shown later that year as part of the exhibition "Op losse schroeven" at the Stedelijk Museum Amsterdam.

=== Per purificare le parole (1969) ===
Per purificare le parole was one of the first of Zorio's large series. This work is intended to be an interactive piece which facilitates the alchemical transformation of spoken language by filtering through alcohol. A long tube of soft hemp was filled with alcohol and attached to a metal frame. The tube was left with two open ends that were raised to the level of a standing person's height. This work becomes interactive when the spectator speaks into one end of the tube. His voice is then filtered, as it runs through the tube, and comes out at the other end of the tube "purified." This work was originally shown at the 1970 "Gennaio '70: Third International Biennial of Young Painting," Bologna. Zorio commented on this work saying, "Alcohol is a mystic liquid. It is also called 'spirits.' It disinfects, burns, inebriates, it transforms and modifies perception." -Gilberto Zorio, 1985.

=== Confine incandescente (1970-1971) ===
Zorio has used text as image throughout his career. He uses many different materials in the creation of these works. Examples of these are in pieces such as: Odio [hate], Confine [border], and Fluidità Radicale [radical fluidity]. Three different versions of Confine were created. In one the word confine was written in incandescent wire and hung in a room. Another version was created by photographer Paolo Mussat Sartor in 1971. Sartor used long exposure to photograph the artist sitting in Sartor studio with the word "confine" written in the air from the smoke of a cigarette. The smoke made it so that the artist could barely be seen. Another version was created by Zorio in 1971 when Zorio wrote "confine" on a gallery wall with luminous ink which was visible only when the lights were off. Every four minutes the lights would turn off for a few seconds to reveal the hidden ink before the lights turned on again.

=== Canoa (1984-1991) ===
Zorio created his first Canoa in 1984. That piece was formed of an elongated terracotta triangle which was balanced on a crucible. Zorio created this series out of many unconventional materials including: wood, leather, javelins, copper sulphate, hydrochloric acid, and alcohol. Zorio's installations have a strong spatial presence, and his canoe has the same aerodynamic feel as the tips of his javelin piece, Stella di giavellotti (Star of javelins). This element is common in his work. Canoa is a real and symbolic piece which suggests fluidity, action, and speed. Zorio uses stars and crucibles in conjunction with his canoes which are associated with sailors and navigation.
