= Kenneth Gangemi =

American poet and fiction writer (born 1937)

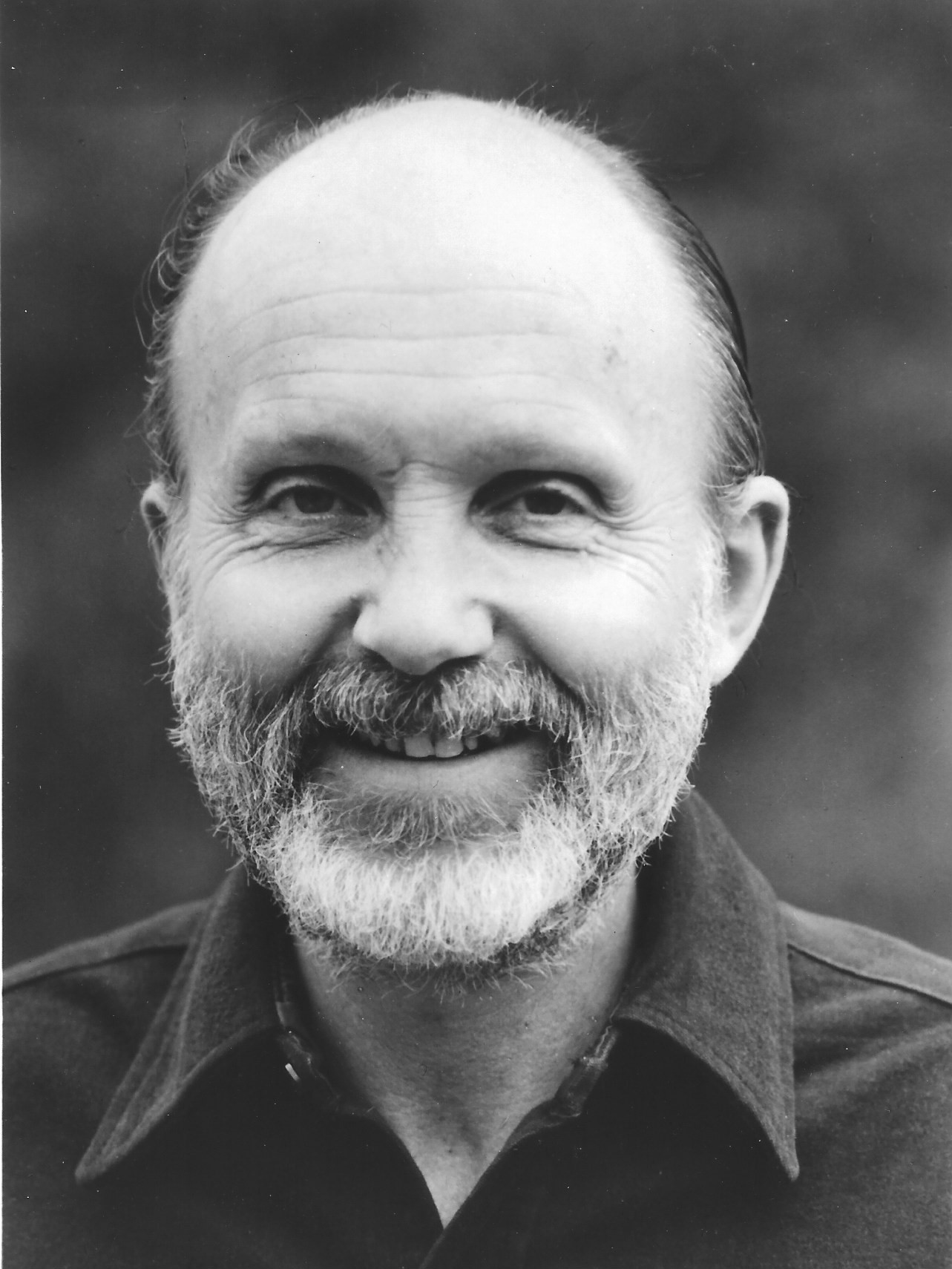
- Kenneth Gangemi
- Born: November 23, 1937 (age 88); Bronxville, New York, USA
- Education: Stanford University, San Francisco State College, Rensselaer Polytechnic Institute, Scarsdale High School
- Occupations: Poet and fiction writer
- Writing career
- Language: English
- Years active: 1966–present
- Notable works: Olt (1969), Lydia (1970), Corroboree (1977), The Volcanoes from Puebla (1979), The Interceptor Pilot (1980)

Kenneth Gangemi (born 1937, Bronxville, New York) is an American poet and fiction writer, best known for his 1969 debut novel, Olt, which has been variously republished and translated.

In addition to publications in magazines and anthologies, he is the author of five books, three of them also published in England. Translations have appeared in French, German, Danish, and Turkish. He has had residencies at the Millay Colony for the Arts, Blue Mountain Center, and the Djerassi Resident Artists Program. He has won a Pushcart Prize, a New York State CAPS grant, and a Stegner Fellowship at Stanford University.

He now resides on the Big Island of Hawaii.

== Published works ==
- Olt, a novel. London: Calder & Boyars, 1969. New York: Orion Press (an imprint of Grossman/Viking), 1969. Paris: L'Herne, 1972. Frankfurt: März Verlag, 1977. London and New York: Marion Boyars, 1985. Copenhagen: Husets Forlag, 1991. Istanbul: Iletisim Yayinlari, 1994. Lincoln: iUniverse, 2001.
- Lydia, a collection of poetry. Los Angeles: Black Sparrow Press, 1970.
- Corroboree, humor and satire. New York: Assembling Press, 1977.
- The Volcanoes from Puebla, fiction based on living and traveling in Mexico. London and New York: Marion Boyars, 1979, 1989. Lincoln: iUniverse, 2001.
- Lydia/Corroborée, a dual volume, Lydia bilingual. Paris: Christian Bourgois, 1980.
- The Interceptor Pilot, a cinematic novel. Paris: Flammarion (Pilote de chasse), 1975. London and New York, Marion Boyars, 1980, 1982. Lincoln: iUniverse, 2001.
