= Sandro Chia =

Italian painter and sculptor (born 1946)

- Born: Alessandro Chia; 20 April 1946 (age 80) (Note: The Enciclopedia Italiana gives a different date of birth, 26 February 1946.); Florence, Italy
- Movement: Transavanguardia
- Website: sandrochia.com (archived)

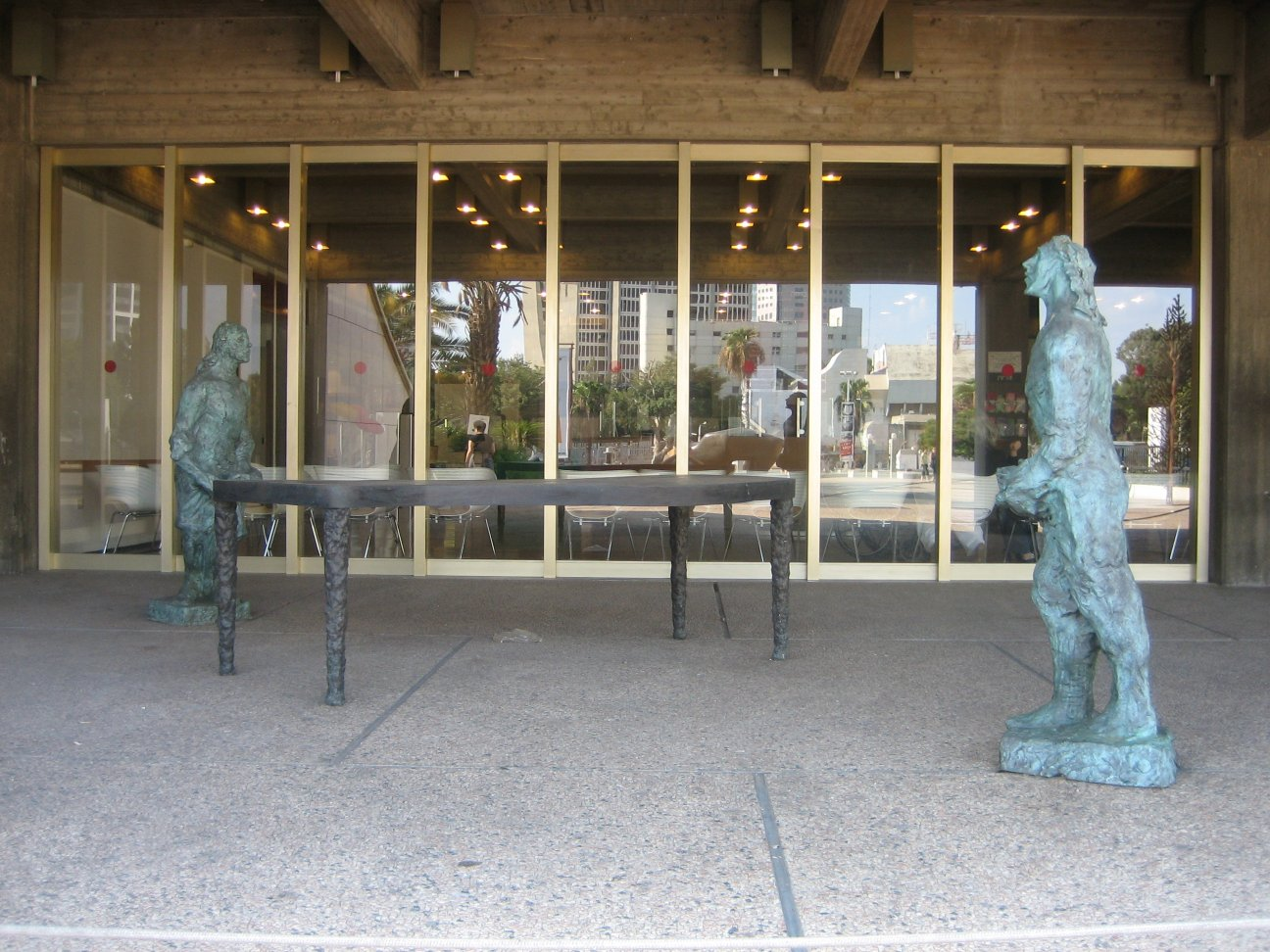
"Table of Peace", bronze, 2003, Tel Aviv Museum of Art

Sandro Chia (born 20 April 1946) is an Italian painter and sculptor. In the late 1970s and early 1980s he was, with Francesco Clemente, Enzo Cucchi, Nicola De Maria, and Mimmo Paladino, a principal member of the Italian Neo-Expressionist movement which was baptised Transavanguardia by Achille Bonito Oliva.

== Life ==
Chia was born in Florence, in Tuscany in central Italy, on 20 April 1946. He studied at the Istituto d'Arte di Firenze from 1962 to 1967, and then, until 1969, at the Accademia di Belle Arti di Firenze. He then travelled in Europe, in Turkey and in India. He settled in Rome in 1970, and began to show work in the following year. He spent the winter of 1980–1981 in Mönchengladbach, in Nordrhein-Westfalen in West Germany, on a study grant. Later that year he moved to New York in the United States, where he lived for more than twenty years. In 1984–1985 he taught at the School of Visual Arts in Manhattan.

== Work ==
Chia's early work tended towards Conceptualism, but from the mid-1970s he began to turn towards more a figurative approach. In June 1979 Paul Maenz showed work by Chia, Francesco Clemente, Enzo Cucchi, Nicola De Maria and Mimmo Paladino at his gallery in Cologne, in Germany. In an article in Flash Art in the same year, the critic Achille Bonito Oliva characterised the group as a new art movement, which he called "Transavanguardia".

His work has been exhibited in a solo or group shows in a number of museums, among them: The Solomon R. Guggenheim Museum in New York in 1983; the Metropolitan Museum of Art in 1984; the Nationalgalerie in Berlin in 1992; the Villa Medici in Rome in 1995; the Magazzini del Sale in Siena in 1997; the Galleria Civica di Arte Contemporanea in Trento in 2000; Palazzo Pitti in Florence in 2002; the Duomo of Sant'Agostino in Pietrasanta in 2007; and the Galleria Nazionale d'Arte Moderna in Rome in 2009–2010. He participated in the Biennale di Venezia in 1984 and 1988.
