= Enzo Cucchi =

Italian painter (born 1949)

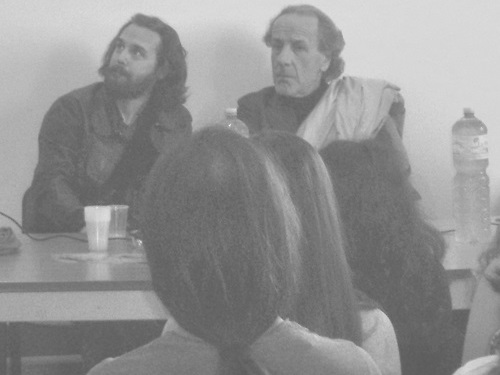
- Enzo Cucchi (right) in a meeting with students at the Academy of Fine Arts of Palermo, in 2014
- Born: 14 November 1949 (age 76); Morro d'Alba, Province of Ancona, Italy
- Education: self-taught
- Known for: painting

Musica Ebbra, 1982, private collection

Enzo Cucchi (born 14 November 1949) is an Italian painter.

A native of in Morro d'Alba, province of Ancona, he was a key member of the Italian Transavanguardia movement, along with fellow countrymen Francesco Clemente, Mimmo Paladino, Nicola De Maria, and Sandro Chia. The movement was at its peak during the 1980s and was part of a wider movement of Neo-Expressionists painters around the world.

His works are held in numerous museum collections including the Museum of Modern Art, the Tate, and the Art Institute of Chicago.

== Bibliography ==
- Diane Waldman (1986). Enzo Cucchi. New York: Solomon R. Guggenheim Museum and Rizzoli.
