= Mafonso (artist) =

Italian painter (1948–2019)

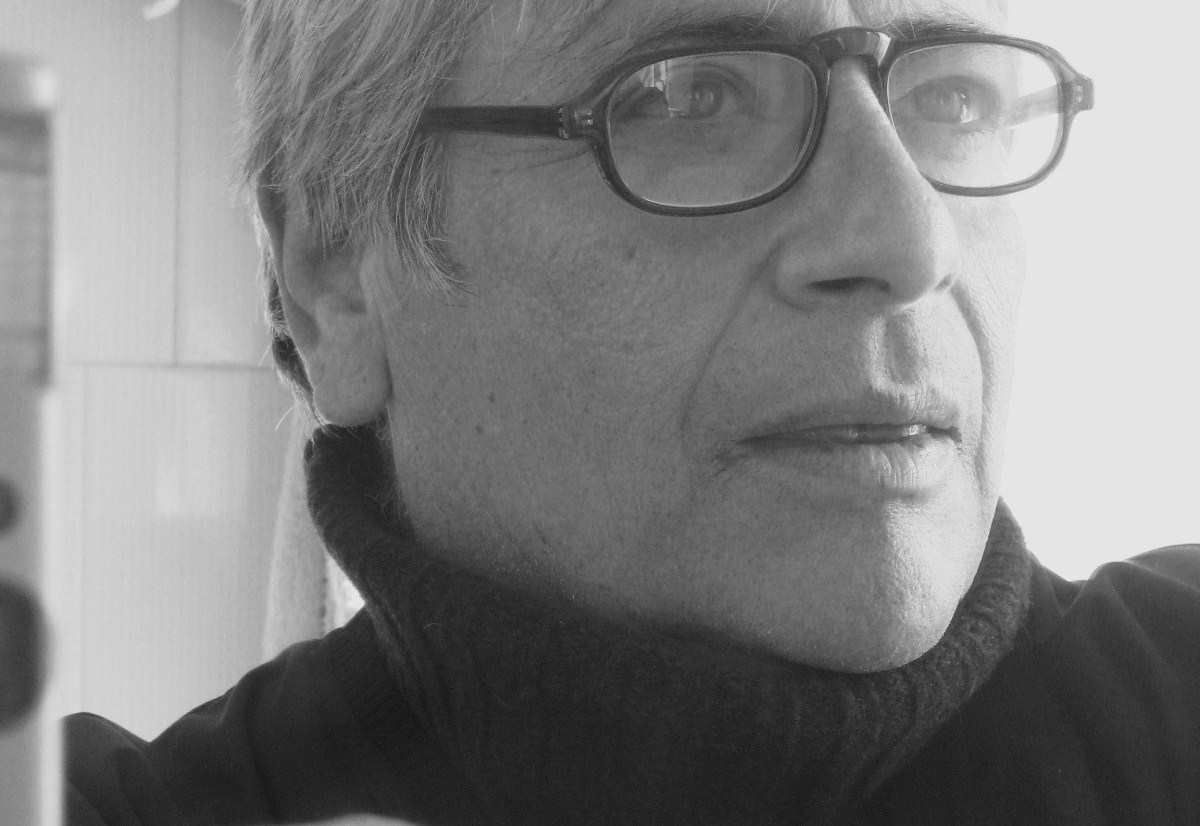
- Mafonso in 2012
- Born: Marino Alfonso; 12 November 1948; Frattaminore, Naples, Italy
- Died: 6 November 2019
- Known for: Painting; sculpture

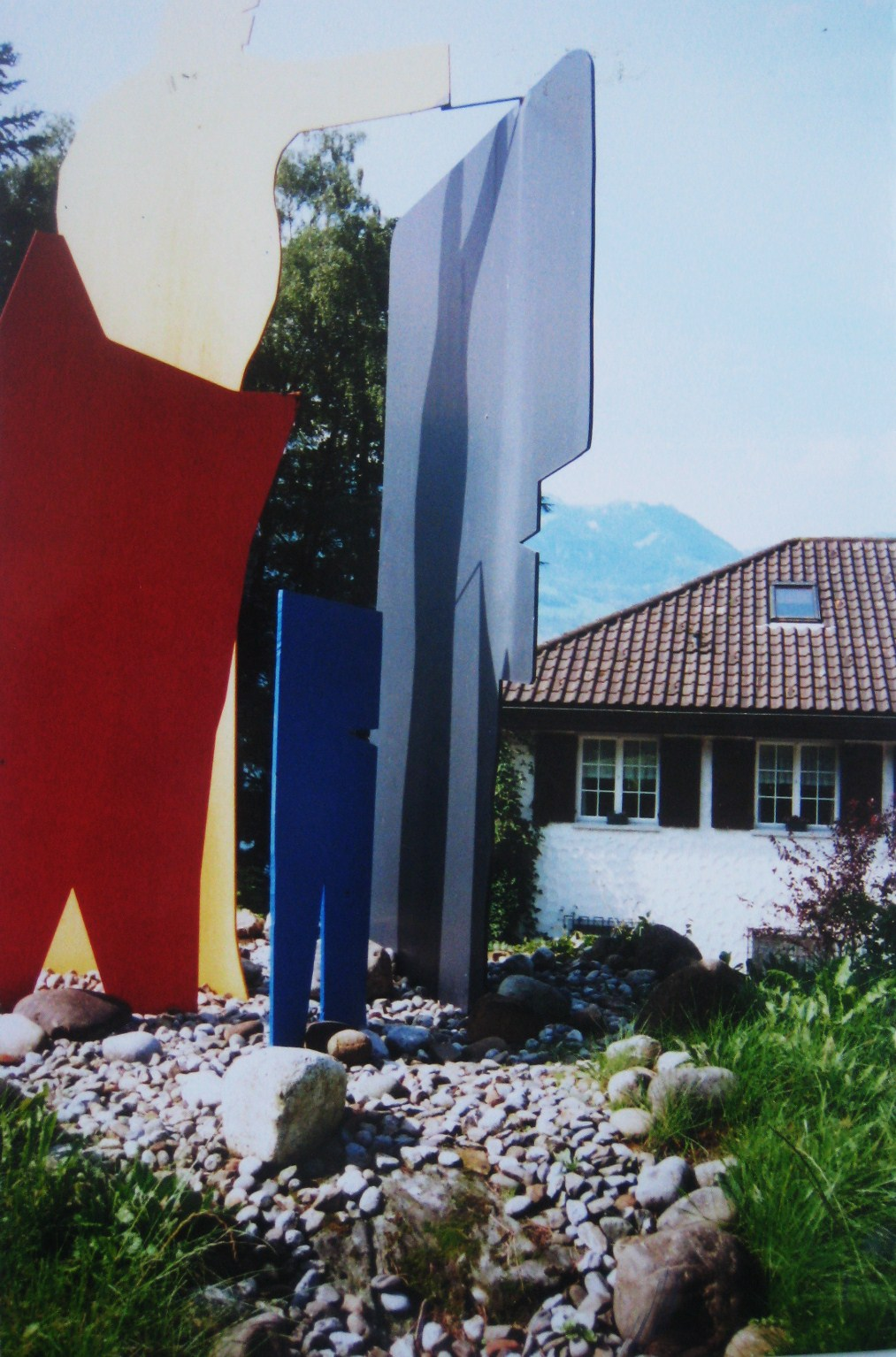
Mafonso sculpture

Marino Alfonso (November 12, 1948 - November 6, 2019), better known as Mafonso, was an Italian painter and sculptor.

He held his first exhibition in Rome at the gallery Agenzia Arte Moderna of Paolo Sprovieri e Gianni Sampietro. In the late 1970s, was one of the founders of the group "Cosa Mentale" presented at the gallery AAM (Architettura Arte Moderna) curated by the art historian Maurizio Fagiolo Dell'Arco, Roma (1979).

1986 "Un Panorama di Tendenze" Castel Sant'Angelo Rome Editor Luciano Luisi Publisher Newton Compton.

In 2005, he participated in the group exhibition "13x17: artisti per un'indagine eccentrica sull'arte in Italia, curated by Philippe Daverio, published by Rizzoli(2007)

and Pittori figurativi italiani della seconda metà del xx secolo, at the Mole Vanvitelliana di Ancona curated by Armando Ginesi.

In 2011, he was invited to the Venice Biennale 54. Pavilion Italy. Pavilion Campania (Vittorio Sgarbi Stato dell'arte: Regioni d'Italia published by Skira)

== 1970s—1990s ==
MAFONSO is formed by self-taught in the early 70s living in Italy (Rome) and Switzerland (Altdorf, Uri).

During the 70s, he developed a style of painting in which the primitive artistic influences are recognizable. In 1974, in Altdorf, he realized the large triptych entitled "Alla Maniera Degli Altri" looking at Picasso and published in the catalog "Racconti Simbad Lune" Electa edition, curated by Francesco Gallo e Laura Cherubini).

In Rome, he attended the modern art gallery agency (Sprovieri Paolo director) where he had the opportunity to learn about the work of the great masters (Cy Twombly, Lucio Fontana, Alberto Burri, Juan Miró). In 1976, he exhibited for the first time, in Rome, at the Agency of Modern Art, a series of works entitled "Comportamento del segno". In the capital he befriended the poet Emilio Villa and binds to a group of young artists ( Pulsoni, Bissattini, Filieri, Grottesi, Luciano Puzzo) Telaro, founding the group "Cosa Mentale" theorized by historian Maurizio Fagiolo Dell'Arco.

In the early 80s, he presented a group of works entitled "Le grandi strade piene" at the Museum ST.Paul de Vance in Nice theorized in the catalog by Sandra Orienti and Enzo Battarra with a poem by Emilio Villa. In that same year, Sandra Orienti the signals between the emerging Italian artists, in the catalog of Modern Art G. Mondadori Ranked N. 18 along with Enzo Cucchi, Nino Longobardi, Ernesto Tatafiore.

In 1985 he exhibited in Basel, Art 13-84 with a personal exposure (gallery studio Soligo) and he participated in the exhibition entitled " Mosaico Mosaico - 5 mosaici per 5 artisti -", together with Mario Schifano, Parres, Tano Festa e Cesare Berlingeri, at the gallery Studio Soligo, Rome. He attended the artists of the Pop Art Italian (especially Tano Festa and some young artists in the capital (Cesare Berlingeri, Alberto Parres).

He exhibited, at that time, in major European capitals and its artist's book "Make Make" inspired the cycle of the same name, published in Paris (1989) with the French critic Gerard Barriere, is exhibited at the Centre Pompidou. He realized, in mid 80s, a folder containing 5 serigraphs, titled "Krakatoa" published by the gallery Claudia Gian Ferrari, Milan.

During the 80s and 90s, he produced major thematic cycles including, Le grandi strade piene, Racconti solari, Prime nevi del dopo 2000, Krakatoa, the moons of Arqa, make make, Tribe in esodo, Contano solo i cieli, Nevicate acide, Vanno tutti verso il nulla, and Tempi anni Deserti.

== Post—2000 ==
Mafonso made his first work of a social nature, "Plus Ultra". Along with the historian Francesco Gallo and The gallery owner Angelo Marino (dirartecontemporanea) manufactures and installs it in front of the Royal Palace of Caserta, Piazza Carlo III, as an index of reflection and protest for what happened in New York on September 11. The work is a sail 12 meters high pyramid consisting of white blocks (islands of time) to induce the historical consciousness to a vision of life simpler and less troubled.

After this reflection of social, Mafonso gives rise to a series of works such as "social imaginary," in truth dictated by considerations on the new theory of "Globality". The works of this period (2003-2004) are part of the cycle " Tempi Anni Deserti " and are shown with a personal at the (Fondazione Orestiade, Gibellina (TP) 20/06/2002) and the Palazzo Dei Capitani in Ascoli Piceno(2003).

The book of the same title is published by Orestiadi Foundation and is curated by the critic Francesco Gallo.

That same year he was invited to exhibit together with Angel Orensanz during the seminary program held at Belvedere di San Leucio, Scavare il futuro : nuovi spazi antichi / a cura di Elmar Zorn e della Città di Caserta, Assessorato alla cultura 13 gennaio 2001

(2005-2006) MAGI '900 - Museo delle eccellenze artistiche e storiche Mostra delle Collezioni Permanenti, 7. Generazione Anni Quaranta, Bologna.

In 2010 he created a corten steel sculpture titled "DIMORE" for the city of Capua.

he was invited to exhibit in the international collective "Mitologie del Presente" (2003) (Carlo Alfano, Guido Biasi, Marco Brandizzi, Lucio Del Pezzo, Andrea Della Rossa, Bruno Di Bello, Jan Dibbets, Gerardo Dicrola, Aldo Gentilini, Ray Johnson, Mafonso, Riko Mikesca, Hidetoshi Nagasawa, Hermann Nitsch, Dennis Oppenheim, Vettor Pisani, Fabrizio Plessi, Michele Zaza) at Varart gallery in Florence.

and Un anfiteatro per la Pace. Stendardi d’Artista presso GALLERIA DELLE ARTI CONTEMPORANEE Ex Cenobio Sant'Agostino (progetti) e Piazza Dante Caserta (stendardi) (Carla Accardi, Arcangelo Esposito, Angelo Bellobono, Elisabetta Benassi, Dafni&Papadatos, Gianni Dessì, Francesco Impellizzeri, Jannis Kounellis, H.H. Lim, Mafonso, Luigi Mainolfi, Fabio Mauri, Sukran Moral, Hidetoshi Nagasawa, Michele Zaza).

2013 winners the international competition «Underground»

2013 Mafonso "di_segni - works 2013" Box dirartecontemporanea 2.0 gallery (Shows virtual mode).

In 2014 he exhibited at the Medieval Castle of Sperlinga in the exhibition A sud del pensiero: ri-tratti mediterranei. Omaggio a Carla Accardi

In 2016, heparticipated in the group show "Friends" (Luigi Auriemma, Antonio Biasiucci, Arturo Casanova, Piero Chiariello, Francesco Coco, Bruno Fermariello, Mariano Filippetta, Queen Jose'Galindo, Claudia Jares, Nino Longobardi, Mafonso, Evelia Mormolejo Maria, Paul Ondit, Gloria Pastore)

and Maremitovita official event of the Yacht Med Festival (exposure of Mafonso and Mariano Filippetta artists at the Municipal Art Gallery in Gaeta).

PLUS ULTRA DI MAFONSO, FIFTEEN YEARS LATER at D2.0-Box of Angelo Marino in Caserta (2016)

In 2018 Museum of Contemporary Art Donnaregina (MADRE) Per_formareunacollezione 22 June 2018, Naples

== Mafonso in museums ==
His works are kept at the Art Museum of the nineteenth and twentieth century Rende_MAON, the Modern Art Gallery of Paternò at the Art Museum of Italian Generations of '900 of Pieve di Cento, Bologna. Pinacoteca metropolitana di Bari and Museo d'arte contemporanea Donnaregina (MADRE) Per_formareunacollezione Napoli

== Bibliography ==
- Maurizio Fagiolo dell'Arco (a cura di) Mafonso Segnali Di Confine in Cosa Mentale pag. 26-27-28-29 editore AAM Roma 1979 BIBLIOTECA D'ARTE - FONDAZIONE TORINO MUSEI (TO0) http://www.librinlinea.it/search/public/appl/dettaglio.php?bid=IEI0273686
- Luciano Luisi (a cura di ) Mafonso in Un Panorama di Tendenze editore Newton Compton, Roma 1986 Biblioteca Giovanni Carandente della Galleria civica d'arte moderna - Spoleto - PG SBN RML0134862 http://opacsbn.regioneumbria.eu/SebinaOpac/Opac?action=search&IdSBN=RML0134862
- Emilio Villa, Pour Mafonso et sa dèesse in Le grandi strade piene Sandra Orienti (a cura di), Svizzera : Meinrad Camenzind, 1982, SBN RMR0034415 Biblioteca Giulio Carlo Argan del Dipartimento di storia dell'arte e dello Spettacolo - Sezione Arte. Sapienza Università di Roma http://opac.uniroma1.it/SebinaOpacRMS/Opac?action=search&thNomeDocumento=RMS1664473T
- Laura Cherubini, Mafonso Magica metamorfosi in Racconti Simbad Lune Francesco Gallo Mazzeo (a cura di) pag.26-27-28 edizione Electa Milano 1989 ISBN 8843527762, Biblioteca del Castello di Rivoli Museo d'arte contemporanea - Rivoli - TO http://www.librinlinea.it/search/public/appl/dettaglio.php?bid=LO10021287
- Francesco Gallo Mazzeo (a cura di) : Mafonso plus ultra editore Città di Caserta 2003 SBN NAP0342610 Biblioteca del Palazzo delle Arti Napoli - Napoli http://polosbn.bnnonline.it/SebinaOpac/Opac?action=search&IdSBN=NAP0342610
- Giorgio Di Genova, Collezioni Permanenti, 7. Generazione Anni Quaranta, Bologna, Bora, 2005, p. 183, ISBN 88-88600-32-9.
- Philippe Daverio (a cura di) 13 X 17 1000 ARTISTI PER UN'INDAGINE ECCENTRICA SULL'ARTE IN ITALIA Rizzoli editore, 2007, ISBN 978-88-17-01895-1.
- Giorgio Di Genova (a cura di) Storia dell'arte italiana del '900 - Volume 6, Parte 2 - Pagina 1280-1283-1418 (Edizioni Bora, 2009) https://books.google.com/books?id=nyNJAQAAIAAJ&q=mafonso ISBN 978-88-88600-54-3
- Nino Arrigo Mafonso Il tempio di Minerva in A SUD DEL PENSIERO: RI-TRATTI MEDITERRANEI. OMAGGIO A CARLA ACCARDI.edizione Lussografica 2014 ISBN 8882433250, 9788882433253
- Vincenzo Trione (a cura di) Atlante dell’Arte Contemporanea a Napoli e in Campania 1966 — 2016 scheda Loredana Troise Mafonso pag. 147, 245, 271, 316, 426 Electa 2017 ISBN 978-88-918-1085-4
