= Lea Vergine =

Italian art historian (1936–2020)

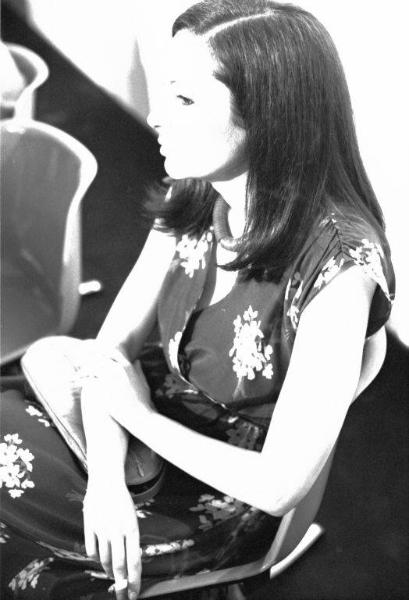
- Lea Vergine in 1974
- Born: Lea Buoncristiano; 5 March 1936; Naples, Kingdom of Italy
- Died: 20 October 2020 (aged 84); Milan, Italy
- Occupations: Art historian, curator, art critic
- Spouse: Enzo Mari (m. 1978; died 2020)

Lea Buoncristiano (5 March 1936 – 20 October 2020), known as Lea Vergine, was an Italian art critic, essayist, and curator.

== Biography ==
=== Naples: childhood, youth, and early exhibitions ===
Lea Buoncristiano was born in Naples on 5 March 1936, where she was raised by her grandparents who took her away from her mother, whom they considered to be too humble of a background. She received her first schooling from a private teacher. She then attended the Liceo Umberto I, where she formed a close relationship based on mutual esteem with her Italian teacher, Teresa Benevento. She enrolled in the Faculty of Philosophy, which she left at the age of 19 to start writing for local newspapers. Vergine married Adamo Vergine at a very young age in the same year and kept his surname even after their separation.

Her first article of art criticism was published in 1959 in I 4 Soli, a bilingual avant-garde magazine founded in 1954 and directed by the painter Adriano Parisot. Her collaboration with I 4 Soli, which lasted until 1960, brought her into contact with intellectuals and young critics interested in the creation of a "review of current art" (as the magazine's cover states) that would establish a decisive link between Italian and French contemporary art.

Vergine was driven by an interest in current actualities and a "desire to be in the midst of what is happening"; Attentive to the new trends in the art scene of her city, in 1963 she wrote Undici pittori napoletani di oggi (Eleven Neapolitan Painters of Today), a text that collected the work of artists including Emilio Notte, Vincenzo Ciardo, Giovanni Brancaccio, Domenico Spinosa, Corrado Russo, Raffaele Lippi, Armando De Stefano, Renato Barisani, Carlo Alfano, Carmine Di Ruggiero, and Gianni Pisani, with a preface by art critic Giulio Carlo Argan.

In the same years, Vergine started to collaborate with the private gallery Il Centro (founded in 1960 by Renato Bacarelli and the brothers Arturo and Armando Caròla), where she started to collaborate in the organisation of some exhibitions, such as the 1963 solo exhibition of Lucio Fontana, presenting seventeen Spatial concepts in between 1952 and 1962. These were the years in which Fontana was working on the "ciclo dei buchi" (cycle of holes, 1949–1968) and the "ciclo dei tagli" (cycle of cuts, 1958–1968). The reactions to the exhibition revealed a still profoundly chauvinist approach to society and the art world. The critic Luigi Compagnone accused Vergine in an article in Il Tempo of sexual perversion for having spoken of "holes" referring to the artist's work.

In 1965, Vergine presented at Il Centro the exhibition on MID(Mutation, Image, Dimension), a group of visual experimenters who presented their poetic and programmatic statements Antonio Barrese, membro del MID. Antonio Barrese, a member of the MID, recalls: "Lea Vergine ... was in some way our vestal." The last exhibition curated by Vergine at Il Centro, in the new premises in via Carducci, was Napoli '25/'33, in 1971. The group exhibition was born with the intention of bringing to light artists who were active in Naples during Fascism and who had been marginalised because of their political opposition to the regime and their counter-current research. Lea Vergine reconstructed a critical historiography that for many decades "was to remain a manifesto against the cultural marginalisation of this city, a capital city that was removed and self-removed from the broader narrative of the history of Italian art in the 20th century". On the occasion of the exhibition a catalogue was published by Il Centro Edizioni with photographs by Mimmo Jodice and Rocco Pedicini and a graphic design by Bruno Di Bello.

In the mid-1960s, Vergine began to commute between Naples and Rome, where she rented a flat near Piazza Navona. In the capital she was able to deepen her relationship with Giulio Carlo Argan and get to know Palma Bucarelli, director of the Galleria Nazionale d'Arte Moderna, Rossana Rossanda, Bruno Zevi and Fabio Mauri. She began a collaboration with Radio3, Rai's culture channel, interviewing authors and reporting on current exhibitions. In Rome she also frequented various artists, including the Piazza del Popolo group, but also numerous galleries such as La Tartaruga, L'Attico or Galleria Pogliani.

In 1964, Argan invited Lea Vergine to design and direct the avant-garde magazine Lineastruttura. On this occasion, she met Enzo Mari, who Argan engaged to take care of the graphics. The magazine was created as a quarterly review to offer the public a debate on new contemporary trends in architecture and design. Art critics such as Achille Bonito Oliva, Palma Bucarelli, Gillo Dorfles and Filiberto Menna participated. Only two issues were published between 1966 and 1967 by the Neapolitan publishing house Diaframma.

=== Milanese years ===
In 1966, Vergine moved to Milan. Silvana Mauri, publisher of Bompiani, hired her to present a book by Harold Rosenberg together with Umberto Eco and the collector Giuseppe Panza di Biumo. From these years onwards, Vergine's critical activity was consolidated through more assiduous collaborations with specialist publications, including the contemporary transdisciplinary culture magazine Marcatrè, founded by Eugenio Battisti, Domus and Data, a contemporary art magazine edited by Tommaso Trini. On behalf of the editor Giancarlo Bonacina, she edited the art section of Almanacco Bompiani for the 1968 and 1969 editions. She continued her collaboration with Radio3 and began to write articles for periodicals and newspapers such as Il Tempo illustrato, Paese Sera, and for the international avant-garde art magazine Metro, at the invitation of her friend Gillo Dorfles. She wrote reviews of exhibitions and books for the weekly La Fiera Letteraria and for linus, a monthly comics magazine. In the following years, she undertook long-lasting collaborations with national newspapers such as il manifesto and Il Corriere della Sera.

In Milan, she curated several exhibitions for Guido Le Noci's Galleria Apollinaire, Renato Cardazzo's Naviglio and Carla Pellegrini's Galleria Milano, where in 1969 she inaugurated Irritarte. Appunti per un'analisi delle comunicazioni irritanti. It featured works by Ay-O, Gianfranco Baruchello, Gerardo Di Fiore, Bernard Höke, Tetsumi Kudo, Otto Muehl, Gianni Pisani, Alina Szapocznikow, and Curt Stenvert, "desecrating and irritating objects (deep down)", united by their challenge to social conventions. The title of the exhibition stemmed from the choice of exhibiting works that would provoke a sense of bewilderment in the viewer, generating horror and reflections on death. On the evening of the opening, Otto Muehl carried out a performance (documented in photographs by Ugo Mulas) in front of the public, covering the gallery assistant with liquids and food. The exhibition triggered strong criticism for the crudeness of the works on display, as testified by the words of the journalist Cesare Garboli in Il Mondo: "When you leave ... after the visit, looking for a taxi, you don't know what depressed you more, whether the horror of the revolting, scandalous novelties, or a decrepit piety, on the contrary, domestic and vulgar."

=== Body art ===
Vergine's contribution to the study of body art is fundamental. In the wake of the 1969 exhibition Irritarte, she published a cult book in 1974, Il corpo come linguaggio. La Body Art e storie simili (The Body as a Language: The Body Art and Similar Stories, Prearo Editore), with which she theorised new forms of artistic expression that focused on corporeality, self-harming action and the experience of expiation of pain. In an interview with Daniela Palazzoli, Vergine offered a psychological reading of Body Art, describing it as emotional and liberating; the actions are discharges of emotion aimed at subverting a scale of typically Western structures and values. The book was received with interest by critics and reviewed, among others, by Giulio Carlo Argan and Lucy R. Lippard. Vergine identifies the precedents of Body Art in the practices of visual artists who had already used the body as a means of expression in the 1950s, such as Jackson Pollock or the Gutai Group, up to the performances of Piero Manzoni, Yves Klein, Fluxus, the theatrical experiments of the Living Theatre, and the cinematographic experiments of Andy Warhol. Il corpo come linguaggio reviews performances and actions by sixty artists, including Gina Pane, Gilbert & George, Urs Lüthi, Katharina Sieverding, Rebecca Horn, Trisha Brown, and Günter Brus. In addition to the introductory essay, the book (published in Italian and English) includes a collection of texts written by the artists themselves and a substantial photographic documentation of the happenings and performances. In 2000 the book was republished under the title Body art e storie simili. Il corpo come linguaggio (Skira), with a new afterword by Lea Vergine and the inclusion of artists such as Orlan, Stelarc, Ron Athey, Franko B, Yasumasa Morimura, Jana Sterbak, and Matthew Barney. Angelo Trimarco highlights the differences between the two editions as follows: "by radicalising some of the things she had said in 1974, she overshadowed the theme of the body as a language and instead accentuated another theme, that of the mystical body, the diffused body".

In 1974, Vergine curated, together with the critic Pierre Restany, the exhibition Eros come linguaggio (Eros as language) at the Galleria Eros in Milan, inviting numerous Italian artists to take stock of the amorous-erotic situation of the time. Participants included: Giuseppe Desiato, Hidalgo, M. Orensanz, Ketty La Rocca, G.E. Simonetti, Fabio Mauri, Gianni Pisani, Giannetto Bravi, Adriano Altamira, Nagasawa, Emilio Isgrò, Giuseppe Trotta, Fernando Tonello, Baratella, Duccio Berti, Mimmo Rotella, Franco Ravedone, Neiman. In 1975, Vergine wrote the introductory text for a portfolio of graphic works by nine Italian women artists: Carla Accardi, Mirella Bentivoglio, Valentina Berardinone, Nilde Carabba, Tomaso Binga, Dadamaino, Amalia Del Ponte, Grazia Varisco and Nanda Vigo. The sale of this portfolio served to raise funds for the Libreria delle Donne (Women's Library) that had just opened in Milan. Vergine underlined its political value: "the fact that the war is still on, that the revolt is still going on, that a revolutionary feminist strategy is still an objective to be developed, is also proved by this portfolio that sees a group of women artists making a political gesture of solidarity towards the movement".

In 1976, Vergine published the volume Attraverso l'arte. Pratica politica. Pagare il '68 (Through art. Political practice. Paying for'68, Arcana Editrice), a documentation of the years around 1968 where she collected and published writings by Gianni-Emilio Simonetti, Manfredo Massironi, Julio Le Parc, Piero Gilardi, Gabriele Devecchi, Daniel Buren, Davide Boriani and her life partner Enzo Mari. In the same year, Vergine also published Dall'informale alla Body art. Dieci voci dell'arte contemporanea 1960/1970 (From informal to Body art. Ten voices of contemporary art 1960/1970). The book proposes, through the voices of artists and their works, an excursus between various currents such as Informal, Body art, Programmed Art, Visual Poetry, and Land art. In 1976, Vergine participated with Renato Barilli in a performance by Luca Patella, at the Galleria Palazzoli in Milan, entitled Presentazione & presente azione di una performance proiettiva di Luca (Presentation and present action of a projective performance by Luca), associated with the presentation of the book Io sono qui/Avventura & cultura (I am here/ Adventure & culture)..

== Major exhibitions ==
=== L'altra metà dell'avanguardia 1910–1940. Pittrici e scultrici nei movimenti delle avanguardie storiche (The Other Half of the Avant-Garde, 1910–1940: Painters and Sculptors in the Historical Avant-Garde Movements) ===
Palazzo Reale, Milan, 16 February – 13 April (extended until 18 May) 1980

The exhibition L'altra metà dell'avanguardia 1910–1940. Pittrici e scultrici nei movimenti delle avanguardie storiche opened on 16 February 1980 at the Palazzo Reale (The Royal Palace) in Milan. Organised by the Municipality of Milan and curated by Lea Vergine, the exhibition investigated the work of women artists within the artistic panorama of the early 20th century avant-garde movements and is recognised as a milestone in the study of art history and gender issues.

=== Arte programmata e cinetica 1953–1963. L'ultima avanguardia (Programmed and Kinetic Art, 1953–1963: The Last Avant-Garde) ===
Palazzo Reale, Milan, 4 November 1983 – 27 February 1984

Vergine had approached the environment of kinetic art thanks to her acquaintance with Giulio Carlo Argan and her companion Enzo Mari. She had outlined a first critical reading of the results of programmed and kinetic art in the magazine Lineastruttura, later developed in the conference of 11 March 1973, within the cycle of didactic activities of the Galleria Nazionale d'Arte Moderna (1972–1973).

In 1983, Vergine curated the group exhibition Arte programmata e cinetica 1953/1963, L'ultima Avanguardia at the Palazzo Reale in Milan. Her research focused on the years of the movement's first theoretical formulations, which she considered the most significant. According to Vergine, "it was the last time that an international group of artists proposed an alternative programme and model of culture and practice of making art", considering the movement to be much more than an exaltation of science and technology, as it re-founded the relationship between the individual and society. The exhibition dedicated an introductory section to Futurists, Abstractionists and Constructivists. The central nucleus contained the works of the main artists of the kinetic movement, including those of Group T, as well as Group N, who systematically analysed the phenomena of perception. It concluded with the works of artists, such as Enrico Castellani, Dadamaino, and Jean Tinguely, who, although conducting research similar to the exponents of programmed art, differed in their procedures and artistic aims.

=== Carol Rama ===
Sagrato del Duomo, Milan, 29 May – 28 July 1985

In 1985, Vergine curated the first retrospective of Carol Rama, organised by the City of Milan and set up by architect Achille Castiglioni in the mezzanine of the underground under the Sagrato del Duomo. Vergine had already included the artist among the protagonists of L'altra metà dell'avanguardia 1910–1940. With this exhibition she presented a conspicuous part of the artist's production throughout the whole arc of her activity, together with documents and objects from her studio house in Turin. The operation contributed significantly to the diffusion of Rama's work, whose first solo exhibition, set up in 1945 at the Opera pia Cucina malati poveri in Turin, was closed by the Nazis for outrageousness.

The catalogue of the exhibition, includes contributions by Lea Vergine, the writer Giorgio Manganelli, the musicologist Massimo Mila, the poet Edoardo Sanguineti, a critical anthology collected by Corrado Levi and an unpublished "homage to Carol Rama" by the composer Luciano Berio.

=== Partitions/Opere Multimedia 1984–85 (Partitions/Multimedia Works 1984–85) ===
Padiglione d'Arte Contemporanea, Milan, 29 November 1985 – 13 January 1986

Partitions/Opere multimedia 1984–85 is the solo exhibition of the French artist Gina Pane curated by Lea Vergine, which opened in 1985 at the Padiglione d'arte contemporanea di Milano (PAC). The exhibition was organised in collaboration with the Centre national des arts plastiques (FIACRE) of the French Ministry of Culture and the Centre Culturel Français in Milan. The exhibition was curated by Marco Albini and Franca Helg. Vergine considered the artist "a leading protagonist, if not the absolute protagonist of body art". At the PAC, Vergine examined the artist's recent production, selecting works from after 1981, the year that marked the end of the cycle of her performances and the beginning of her "partitions", a term whose meaning she explained in the catalogue: "Partitions as the act of dividing, separating, mixing forms, materials, colours, sometimes sonorisations or sounds; but partition also as a musical score that includes the reading and interpretation of the work by the viewer".

In the upper balcony of the PAC, eleven large-format works composed of heterogeneous materials such as drawings, found objects, photographs of actions, glasses and toys were exhibited. In these assemblages the artist's body had disappeared, "there is the evocation of the body. Gina Pane has removed herself from the scene and her body has diffused." The exhibition catalogue contains the curator's essay entitled "Il corpo diffuso", the text "Couleur-blessure" by Giorgio Manganelli, an interview with the artist and a critical anthology.

=== Geometrie dionisiache. In Italia oggi l'arte giovane (Dionysian Geometries: Young Art in Italy Today) ===
Rotonda della Besana, Milan, May–September 1988

The exhibition Geometrie dionisiache: in Italia oggi l'arte giovane was held from May to September 1988 at the Rotonda della Besana in Milan. The exhibition, curated by Lea Vergine and installed by Achille Castiglioni, focused on twenty-three young artists, born between about 1955 and 1960, who during the mid-1980s worked using a vocabulary of abstract or geometric forms. Vergine explained in the catalogue that the title of the exhibition derived from the extensive use of geometry, "bizarre and disobedient geometry, however, anomalous, quarrelsome, often exalted by a Dionysian component". Each of the invited artists had a different point of view with respect to the subject matter. The novelty of these researches laid in the fact that they did not aim at restoring the abstract or the informal, but in the intention to rework them according to their own practice, allowing new heterogeneous styles to emerge.

Artists: Massimo Antonaci, Stefano Arienti, Angelo Barone, Luigi Carboni, Manlio Caropreso, Lucilla Catania, Antonio Catelani, Fabrizio Corneli, Alex Corno, Daniela De Lorenzo, Antonio Di Palma, Aldo Ferrara, Carlo Guaita, Eduard Habicher, Marco Lodola, Marco Mazzucconi, Silvio Merlino, Nunzio, Claudio Palmieri, Luca Quartana, Maurizio Turchet, Antonio Violetta, Alfredo Zelli.

=== Trash. Quando i rifiuti diventano arte (Trash: When Waste Becomes Art) ===
Palazzo delle Albere, Trento, Archivio del '900, Rovereto, 11 September 1997 – 11 January 1998

Trash. Quando i rifiuti diventano arte, inaugurated on 11 September 1997 in the two museums of the MART in Trento and Rovereto, was presented by the curator Lea Vergine as a "parade, a disbandment of apparitions, metaphors and memorial epiphanies" starting from the beginning of the 20th century and ending with the research of the 1990s. The exhibition presented a tone that was "eccentric, necrophilic, ironic, dramatic, ... playful and marked by lightness and gentleness", as Gabriella Belli writes in the catalogue. The meeting point of the invited artists' research was the use of trash in architecture, art, cinema, dance and music. The theme of the recycled object had already been addressed during the early twentieth century, as in Kurt Schwitters' Merzbau (1923–1948) or Marcel Duchamp's Urinal (1917), with the aim of making less elegant materials "art". During the twentieth century there were various motivations that pushed artists towards discarded materials, from social denunciation to simple irony, and that led to the birth of a culture of what is usually considered ugly or useless. The exhibition featured a series of objects that, taken out of their original context and transformed into works of art, told a story. The artist's task was therefore to show how, in a predefined space, the object and the discarded material acquire another value. Relationships between the grotesque and the sacred, the romantic and the ironic were created between the works, "rubbish can be enlightening", Vergine states in the catalogue.

Artists: Eileen Agar, Agullo, Arman, Roberto Marcello Baldessari, Giacomo Balla, Lewis Baltz, Gianfranco Baruchello, Bizhan Bassiri, Gabriella Benedini, Joseph Beuys, Umberto Boccioni, Christian Boltanski, Giovanna Borgese, Enrica Borghi, Louise Borgeois, Giannetto Bravi, George Brecht, Stuart Brisley, Alberto Burri, Carlo Carrà, Enrico Cattaneo, Maurizio Cattelan, Alik Cavaliere, Carla Cerati, César, Ettore Colla, Isabella Colonnello, Primo Conti, Joseph Cornell, Claudio Costa, Tony Cragg, Mario Cresci, Walter Dahn, Sergio Dangelo, Fortunato Depero, Fabio De Poli, Niki De Saint-Phalle, Gérard Deschamp, Giuseppe Desiato, Erik Dietman, Gerardo Di Fiore, Vladimir Vladimirovič Dimitriev, Mark Dion, Willie Doherty, Gerardo Dottori, Marcel Duchamp, Robert Filliou, Peter Fischli & David Weiss, Lucio Fontana, Raffaella Formenti, Hannes Forster, Cesare Fullone, Mario Giacomelli, Robert Gober, Ferdinando Greco, Raymond Hains, David Hammons, Al Hansen, Mona Hatoum, Anthony Hernandez, Tom Egil Jensen, Mimmo Jodice, Paul Joostens, Tadeusz Kantor, Allan Kaprow, Kcho, Imre Kinsky, Alison Knowles, Jiri Kolár, Jannis Kounellis, Dmitri Kozaris, Annette Lemieux, Giorgio Lotti, Uliano Lucas, George Maciunas, Jackson Mac Low, Man Ray, Piero Manzoni, Giuseppe Maraniello, Marca-Relli, Filippo Tommaso Marinetti, Eva Marisaldi, Eliseo Mattiacci, Fabio Mauri, Paul Mc Carthy, Mario Merz, Joachim Ogarra, Charlotte Moorman, Otto Mühl, Ugo Mulas, Hidetoshi Nagasawa, Louise Nevelson, Giulia Niccolai, Cady Nolan, Gastone Novelli, Ron O'Donnel, Catherine Opie, Meret Oppenheim, Orlan, Gabriel Orozco, Nam June Paik, Claudio Parmiggiani, Pino Pascali, Luca Maria Patella, Jacques Pavlovsky, Michel Paysant, Nicola Pellegrini, Irving Penn, Lorenzo Pepe, Tullio Pericoli, Francis Picabia, Pablo Picasso, Michelangelo Pistoletto, Ivan Pougny, Enrico Prampolini, Louie Psihoyos, Carol Rama, Robert Rauschenberg, Raffael Rheinsberg, Rosanna Rossi, Mimmo Rotella, Nancy Rubins, Sabrina Sabato, Tom Sachs, Salvatore Scarpitta, Christian Schad, Carolee Schneemann, Herbert Schürmann, Kurt Schwitters, Andres Serrano, Gino Severini, Cindy Sherman, Ardengo Soffici, Daniel Spoerri, Fausta Squatriti, Jana Sterbak, Erika Stocker, Varvara Stepanova, Antoni Tàpies, olfgang Tillmans, Jean Tinguely, Rirkrit Tiravanija, Matilde Trapassi, Richard Tuttle, Franco Vaccari, Nanni Valentini, Ben Vautier, Vedova-Mazzei, Jacques Villeglé, Volt (Vincenzo Fani Ciotti), Else Von Freytag-Loringhoven, Wolf Vostell, Barbara Watson, Robert Watts, Walter Weer, Richard Wentworth, Franz West, Mike Yamashita, Rougena Zátková, Gilberto Zorio.

=== D'Ombra (Of the Shadow) ===
Palazzo delle Papesse – Centro arte contemporanea, 14 October 2006 – 7 January 2007, MAN Art Museum of the province of Nuoro, Nuoro, 26 January 2007 – 6 May 2007

The exhibition D'ombra was conceived by Lea Vergine for the Palazzo delle Papesse in Pisa and the MAN Museo d'arte della Provincia di Nuoro. Vergine collected the works of forty artists who had dealt with the theme of shadow, of experiences on the borderline between the physical world and the magical world, or such as to highlight the secret part of people and objects. In the exhibition catalogue, she describes the choice of theme as follows: "in the shadows we can project mirages, visions, fears, desires, the unspoken; people we have never met, places we have never been, reverberations of situations and events we may never have experienced: in short, dreams. And a dream is a dream, not an illusion. Perhaps you will find the theme a little singular. It is indeed."

Artists: Mario Airò, Doug Aitken, Carlo Alfano, Laurie Anderson, Stefano Arienti, Luciano Bartolini, Carlo Benvenuto, Barbara Bloom, Christian Boltanski, Fabrizio Corneli, Gino De Dominicis, Peter Fischli & David Weiss, Ceal Floyer, Alberto Garutti, Ann Hamilton, Mona Hatoum, Gary Hill, Joan Jonas, Nino Longobardi, Urs Lüthi, Fabio Mauri, Sebastiano Mauri, Ottonella Mocellin & Nicola Pellegrini, Tracey Moffat, Margherita Morgantin, Marvin E.. Newman, Cornelia Parker, Claudio Parmiggiani, Gianni Pisani, Markus Raetz, Annie Ratti, Rosanna Rossi, Anri Sala, Susanne Simonson, Jana Sterbak, Fiona Tan, Andy Warhol, William Wegman, Francesca Woodman.

=== Un altro tempo. Tra Decadentismo e Modern style (Another Time: Between Decadence and Modern Style) ===
MART Contemporary and Modern Art Museum of Trento and Rovereto, Rovereto, 22 September 2012 – 13 January 2013

Another time. Tra Decadentismo e Modern style is the exhibition curated by Lea Vergine at MART in Rovereto in 2013, in collaboration with curator Francesca Giacomelli. The artists in the exhibition belonged to a group of "great eccentrics"", as Vergine defines them, who were active in London's Bloomsbury district between the late 1910s and the 1930s. What these figures had in common was their intention to subvert Victorian canons in favour of the spread of a modern language. The works on display celebrated this eccentric and unconventional world, based on interweaving: "there are no masterpieces in the exhibition, but there is a network of fabrics of exchanges, of borrowings, of new declinations". The exhibition design, conceived by Antonio Marras and curated by Paolo Bazzani, aimed to transport the spectator into a retro atmosphere through sculptures, paintings, books, drawings, editorial graphics, photography, furniture, as well as textiles and jewellery.

On the occasion of the exhibition, the book Un altro tempo. Tra Decadentismo e Modern style, containing a text by the curator and bio-bibliographical files of the authors and groups on display: Hilda Doolittle, Ezra Pound, John Maynard Keynes, Lytton Strachey, Roger Eliot Fry, Omega Workshop, Vanessa Bell, Duncan Grant, Henri Gaudier-Brzeska, Vorticism, the Sitwells, Cecil Beaton, and William Walton.

== Journalistic activity ==
Lea Vergine's editorial production has been collected in anthologies such as Parole sull'arte (Words on art, Il Saggiatore, 2008), which summarises some of her essays, catalogue presentations, articles, reviews and interviews published from 1965 to 2007; Ininterrotti transiti (Uninterrupted transits, Rizzoli, 2001), which collects her writings from 1987 to 2000; and La vita, forse l'arte (Life, perhaps art, Archinto, 2014), which gathers Vergine's production from 2000 to 2013. It is from the articles in these volumes that we can infer the titles and periods of collaboration that Vergine has had with them over the years.

Vergine has worked with magazines Op.cit. (1964–1965), Marcatrè (1965–1967), Lineastruttura (1966–1967), Metro (1968–1970), L'uomo e l'arte (December 1971), Art and Artist (June 1973), Data (1976–1978), Domus (1976–2007), linus (August 1977), Modo (1977), Alfabeta (July/August 1983), and Il Giornale dell'Arte (December 1992). She had long-lasting collaborations with the daily newspapers il manifesto (1980–2013) and its cultural insert Alias (1999–2010), as well as Corriere della Sera (1988–2005) and their supplements L'architettura (1972–1977) and Abitare (April 2009).

Vergine wrote for culture and society magazines L'Europa letteraria (1965), L'Europeo (3 November 1978), the Tuttolibri (1980–1989) Sunday supplement to the daily La Stampa, Panorama (1981–1988), L'illustrazione Italiana (August 1986), and Vanity Fair (1990–1991). Acknowledging the merits of her long career as a critic and curator, in 2013 the Brera Academy of Fine Arts conferred on Lea Vergine the Academic Diploma Honoris Causa in Communication and Art Didactics and the title of Academician of Italy.

== Death ==
In the autumn of 2020, both Vergine and Mari contracted COVID-19. Both died of complications from the virus: Mari died on 19 October and Vergine the following day. The couple left behind a daughter, Meta. In 2021, Francesca Alfano Miglietti curated the exhibition Corpus Domini. Dal corpo glorioso alle ruvine dell'anima (Corpus Domini: From the Glorious Body to the Ruins of the Soul), created in collaboration with Vergine before her death. The first room of the exhibition was therefore dedicated to the memory of the art critic and her research on body art through archive materials, catalogues and videos.

== Exhibitions ==
- Irritarte. Appunti per una analisi delle comunicazioni irritanti, Galleria Milano, Milan, 9 October – 5 November 1969
- Napoli '25/'33, Galleria Il Centro, Naples, 1971
- Eros come linguaggio, Galleria Eros, Milan, curated by Lea Vergine with Pierre Restany, 16 October 1974 – 8 January 1975
- Azimuth. Mostra documentaria, Galleria d'arte Primo Piano, Rome, November–December 1974, Studio Luca Palazzoli, Milan, October–November 1975
- L'altra metà dell'avanguardia 1910–1940. Pittrici e scultrici nei movimenti delle avanguie storiche, Palazzo Reale, Milan, 16 February – 13 April (extended until 18 May) 1980. Rearranged at Palazzo delle Esposizioni, Rome, 3 July – 8 August 1980; and at Kulturhuset, Stockholm, 14 February – 3 May 1981.
- Arte programmata e cinetica 1953–1963: L'ultima avanguardia, Palazzo Reale, Milan, 4 November 1983 – 27 February 1984
- Carol Rama, Sagrato del Duomo, Milan, 29 May – 28 July 1985.
- Gina Pane. Partitions / Opere multimedia 1984–85, PAC, Milan, 29 November 1985 – 13 January 1986
- Geometrie Dionisiache: in Italia oggi l'arte giovane, Rotonda della Besana, Milan, May – September 1988.
- Lucilla Catania. Statue, Galleria Oddi Baglioni, Rome, May – June 1989
- Alberto Garutti, Orizzonti, XLIV Venice Biennale, Italian pavilion, curated with Laura Cherubini and Flaminio Gualdoni, 1990
- Antonio Trotta. Da Elea a Bisanzio, XLIV Venice Biennale, Italian pavilion, 1990
- Irma Blank. Blue Carnac e storie simili, PAC, Milan 8 October – 8 November 1992
- Trash. Quando i rifiuti diventano arte, Palazzo delle Albere, Trento, Archivio del '900, Rovereto, 11 September 1997 – 11 January 1998
- Il Bello e le bestie. Metamorfosi, artifici e ibridi dal mito all'immaginario scientifico, curated by Lea Vergine and Giorgio Verzotti, MART Contemporary and Modern Art Museum of Trento and Rovereto, Rovereto, 11 December 2004 – 8 May 2005
- Nunzio, ombre. Opere 2005, Galleria dello Scudo, Verona, 10 December 2005 – 18 March 2006
- Tuttolibri, Galleria Milano, Milan, 12 December 2006 – 10 February 2007
- D'Ombra, Palazzo delle Papesse – Centro arte contemporanea, Siena, 14 October 2006 – 7 January 2007, MAN, Nuoro, 26 January – 6 May 2007
- Un altro tempo. Tra Decadentismo e Modern style, MART Contemporary and Modern Art Museum of Trento and Rovereto, Rovereto, 22 September 2012 – 13 January 2013

== Main works ==
- Irritarte, catalogue of the exhibition curated by Lea Vergine at Galleria Milano, Galleria Milano, Milan, 1969
- Il corpo come linguaggio. La Body art e storie simili, Prearo editore, Milan, 1974
- Attraverso l'Arte. Pratica politica. Pagare il '68., Arcana, Rome, 1976
- Dall'Informale alla Body Art. Dieci voci dell'Arte Contemporanea: 1960/1970, Cooperativa Editoriale Studio Forma, Turin, 1976
- L'altra metà dell'avanguardia. 1910–1940. Pittrici e scultrici nei movimenti delle avanguardie storiche, exhibition catalogue edited by Lea Vergine at Palazzo Reale in Milan, Mazzotta Editore, Milan, 1980
- La vita, la morte, la memoria, in tredicesima Biennale Internazionale del Bronzetto Piccola Scultura, catalogue of the exhibition at the Museo Civico degli Eremitani in Padua, published by Comune di Padova, 1981
- L'Arte ritrovata. Alla ricerca dell'altra metà dell'avanguardia, Rizzoli, Milan, 1982
- Capri 1905–1940. Frammenti postumi, Feltrinelli, Milan, 1983; La Conchiglia, Capri, 1993; Skira, Milan, 2003.
- Arte programmata e cinetica 1953–1963. L'ultima avanguardia, catalogue to the exhibition curated by Lea Vergine at Palazzo Reale in Milan, Mazzotta Editore, 1983
- L'Arte in gioco, Garzanti, Milan, 1988
- Gli ultimi eccentrici, Rizzoli, Milan, 1990
- L'arte in trincea. Lessico delle tendenze artistiche 1960–1990, Skira, Milan, 1996
- Trash. Quando i rifiuti diventano arte, exhibition catalogue edited by Lea Vergine at the MART in Trento and Rovereto, Electa, Milan, 1997
- Staccioli, exhibition catalogue edited by Lea Vergine and Davies Hugh M. at Centro per le Arti Visive, Peschiera, Pesaro, Charta, Milan, 1997
- Body art e storie simili. Il corpo come linguaggio, new edition of Il corpo come linguaggio, Skira, Milan, 2000
- Ininterrotti transiti, collection of writings published in newspapers, magazines, catalogues between 1988 and 2000, Rizzoli, Milan, 2001
- Schegge. Ester Coen intervista Lea Vergine sull'arte e la critica contemporanea, Skira, Milan, 2001
- Annette Messager. Pudique, publique, by Lea Vergine and Robert Storr, edited by L. Fusi, translation by T. Davis, Gli Ori, Pistoia, 2002
- I luoghi dove le cose non-cessano di mutare, catalogue of the exhibition Le stanze dell'arte. Figure e immagini del XX secolo at MART in Trento and Rovereto, Skira, Milan, 2002
- Il Bello e le bestie. Metamorfosi, artifici e ibridi dal mito all'immaginario scientifico, exhibition catalogue edited by Lea Vergine and Giorgio Verzotti at MART in Trento and Rovereto, Skira, Milan, 2004
- L'altra metà dell'avanguardia 1910–1940. Pittrici e scultrici nei movimenti delle avanguardie storiche, Il Saggiatore, Milan, 2005
- Della disappartenenza, in I luoghi e l'anima, exhibition catalogue at Palazzo Reale in Milan, Federico Motta editore, Milan, 2005
- Nunzio, ombre, catalogue of the exhibition curated by Lea Vergine at the Galleria lo Scudo in Verona, 2005
- Hallenbad Book, Letizia Cariello and Lea Vergine, Charta, Milan, 2006
- D'Ombra, catalogue of the exhibition at Palazzo delle Papesse in Siena, Silvana Editoriale, Milan, 2006
- Quando i rifiuti diventano arte. Trash rubbish mongo, Skira, Milan, 2006
- Parole sull'arte. 1965–2007, miscellaneous collection of essays, presentations in catalogues, reviews and articles, Il Saggiatore, Milan, 2008
- La vita, forse l'arte, collection of articles and reviews, Archinto editore, Milan, 2014
- L'arte non è faccenda di persone perbene. Conversazioni con Chiara Gatti, Rizzoli, Milan, 2016
- Napoli '25/'33, Clean, Naples, 2018

== Books, essays, and interviews about Vergine ==
- La body art. Conversation with Angelo Trimarco in: S. Zuliani, Figure dell'Arte, 1950–2000, Editoriale Modo, Milan, 2005.
- Maria Antonietta Trasforini, Donne d'arte: storie e generazioni, Meltemi editore, Milan, 2006.
- Francesca Alfano Miglietti, La signora della body in: Mara Pozzati, Artiste della critica, Corraini Edizioni, Mantua, 2015
- Stefania Gaudiosi, Necessario è solo il superfluo. Intervista a Lea Vergine, Postmedia Books, Milan, 2019
- Angela Maderna, L'altra metà dell'avanguardia quarant'anni dopo, Postmedia Books, Milan, 2020

== Conferences ==
- Arte: utopia o regressione?, San Marino, 7–9 June 1991, proceedings published by Mazzotta, 1992
- La scena del rischio. Follia e rassicurazione nelle arti di oggi, proceedings published by U. Allemandi 1998
