= Gentilini =

Gentilini is an Italian surname. Notable people with the surname include:

- Aldo Gentilini (1911–1982), Italian painter and sculptor
- Fernando Gentilini (born 1962), Italian diplomat
- Franco Gentilini (1909–1981), Italian painter
- Giancarlo Gentilini (1929–2025), Italian politician and lawyer
