= Iela Mari =

Italian illustrator and author (1931–2014)

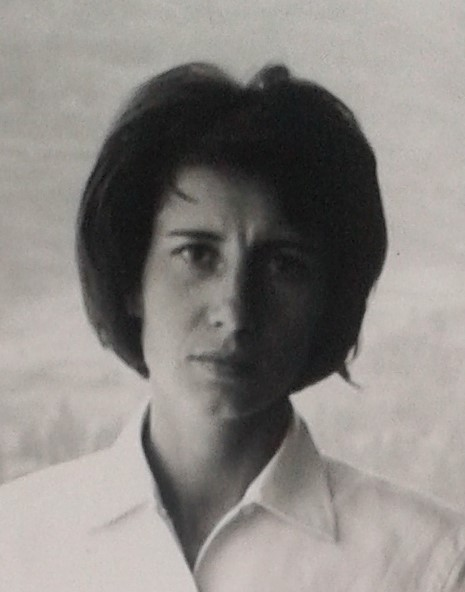
- Born: Gabriela Ferrario; March 1931; Milan, Italy
- Died: 29 January 2014 (aged 82); Milan, Italy
- Education: Brera Academy
- Occupations: Illustrator and writer
- Known for: Children's books
- Spouse: Enzo Mari
- Children: Two

Iela Mari, born as Gabriela Ferrario (March 1931 – 29 January 2014), was an Italian, Milan-based illustrator and author of wordless children's books driven by a storyline consisting of only graphics, sometimes called "silent books."

== Life and work ==
Gabriela (shortened to Iela) studied painting at Milan's Brera Academy, where she met her future husband, Enzo Mari, who was pursuing scenography at the time. They married in 1955.

Iela Mari collaborated with her husband to publish her first book, The Red Balloon, in 1968. They worked together on more books and she went on to create others alone.

The predominant feature of her books is their lack of words and how they tell simple and poetic stories based on the strength of graphic refinement. Mari's main idea was to use shapes and colors in an almost abstract way: the author was convinced that the thought of young children, to whom her work was addressed, proceeded by associations, and that this could allow them to develop selective attention while simultaneously stimulating their imaginations. She was "devising an image-based language for children."

In 1968 with the publication of her first book, The Red Balloon, she said: "I would like to draw attention to the forms in relation to the bombardment of the images produced by television."

For the books that Iela produced with Enzo, her name appeared as first author. After the couple's marriage ended, Iela continued to have the books published as sole author. According to Beckett:

The "books without words" produced by Iela and Enzo Mari in the 1960s have become classics. The couple's graphic innovation revolutionized Italian children's literature. Enzo Mari has received much more critical attention than his wife, Iela, despite the fact that she published several picturebooks on her own in addition to those on which they collaborated. Their first books were conceived for their own children.

Her books continue to be published around the world, including France, England, Spain, Portugal, Germany, Japan, Taiwan and Korea.

=== Honors ===
Iela Mari twice received awards from the Bologna Children's Book Fair (Italy): in 1973 for L'Albero (The Tree, the Dormouse and the Birds), and again in 1977 for Once Upon a Time There was a Sea Urchin.

A 2010 exhibition by the Hamelin Association was dedicated to her work.

=== Private life ===
She married Enzo Mari in 1955 and they had two children, Michele and Agostina.

== Selected publications ==
Her books continue to be republished.

- Mari, Iela. El globito rojo. Lumen, 1996.
- Mari, Iela. Un globo vermello. Kalandraka, 2006.
- Mari, Iela, and Enzo Mari. La manzana y la mariposa. Kalandraka, 2006.
- Mari, Iela. Mangia che ti mangio. Babalibri, 2010.
