= Enzo Mari =

Italian designer (1932–2020)

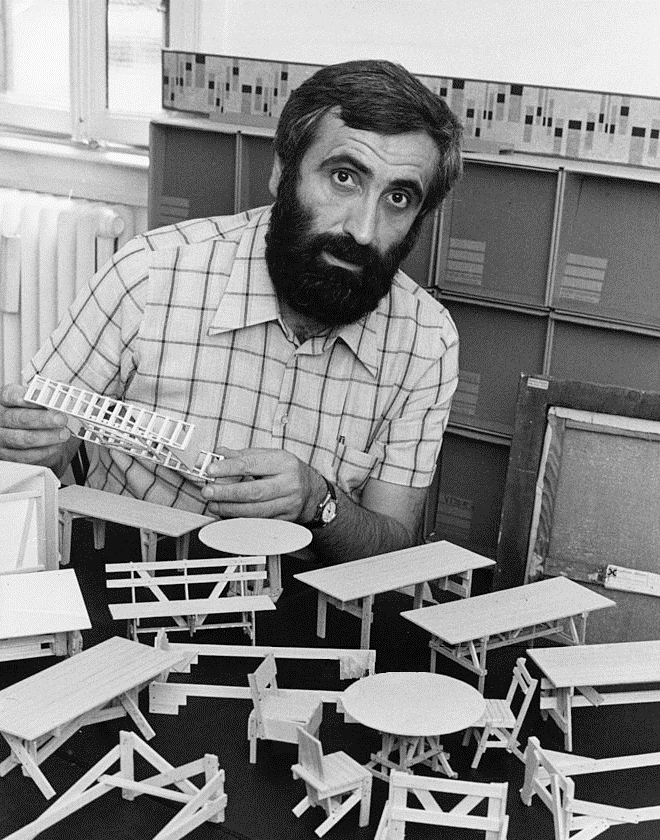
- Enzo Mari with Autoprogettazione models in his studio in Milan, 1974
- Born: 27 April 1932; Cerano, Kingdom of Italy
- Died: 19 October 2020 (aged 88); Milan, Italy
- Spouse: Lea Vergine (m. 1978)
- Website: enzomari.it

Enzo Mari (27 April 1932 – 19 October 2020) was an Italian modernist artist and furniture designer who is known to have influenced many generations of industrial designers.

== Early life and education ==
Mari was born in Cerano, Italy, and he studied at the Brera Academy in Milan, Italy from 1952 to 1956.

== Career ==
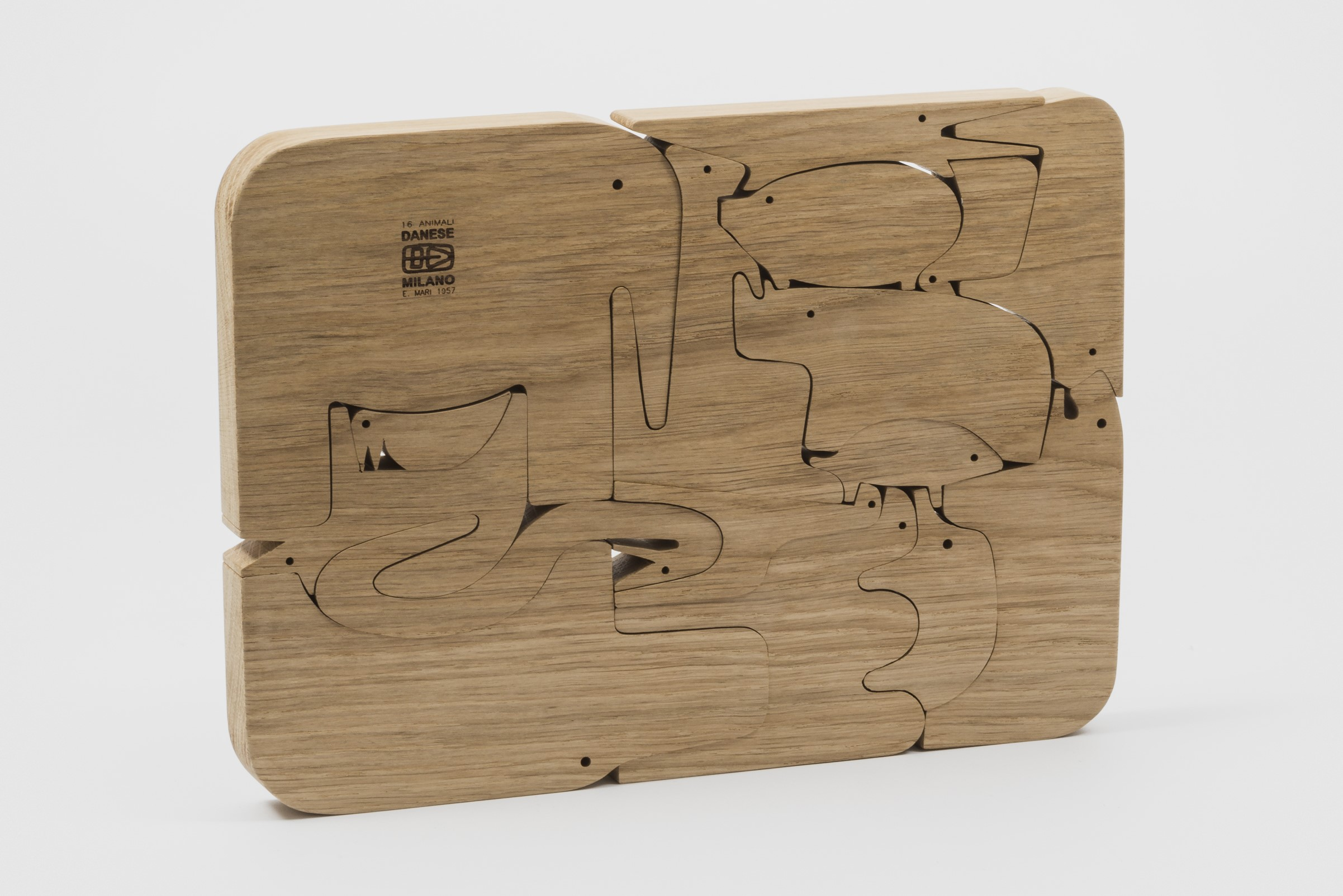
16 animali puzzle for Danese (1957)

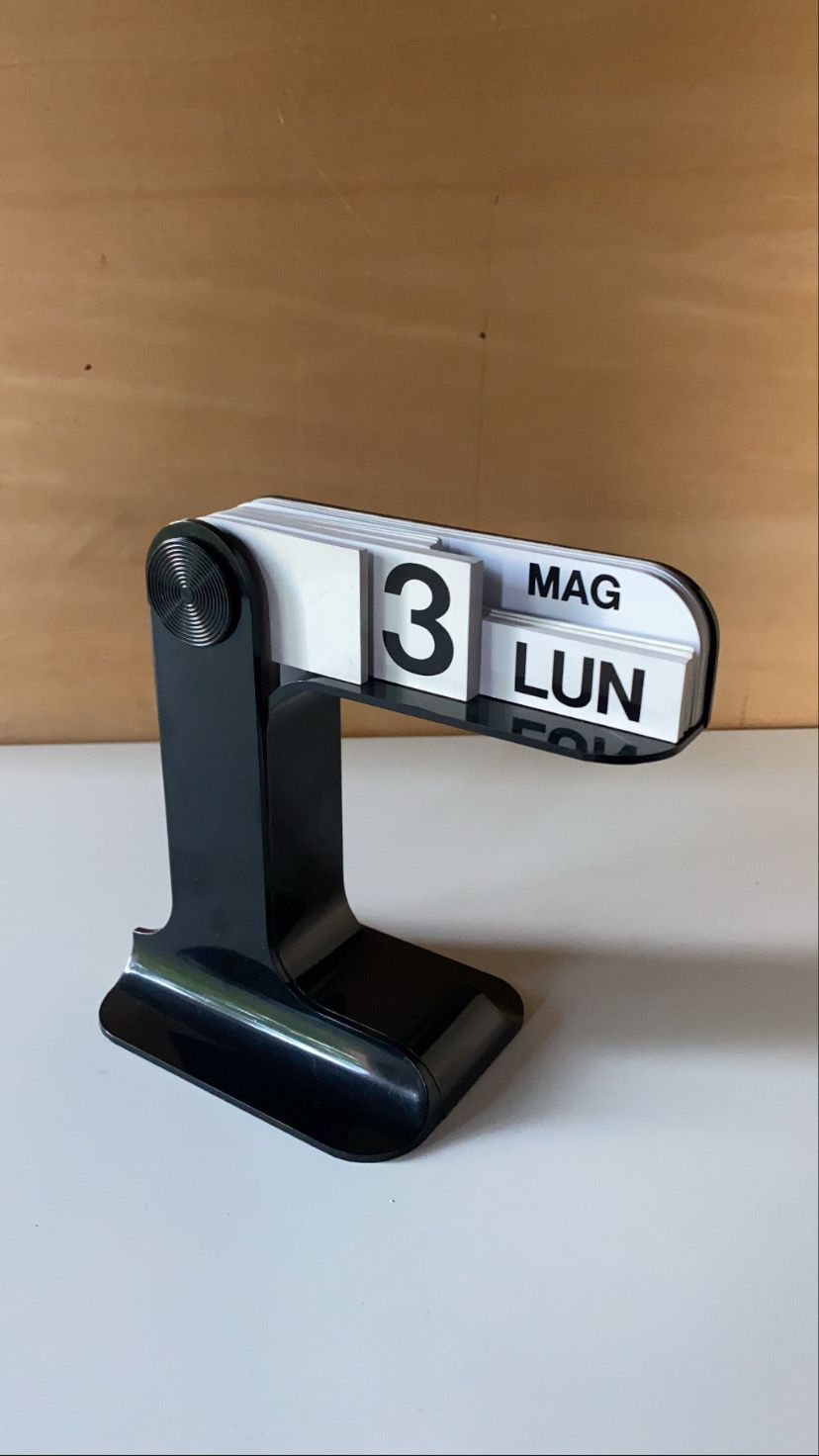
Timor perpetual calendar for Danese (1967)

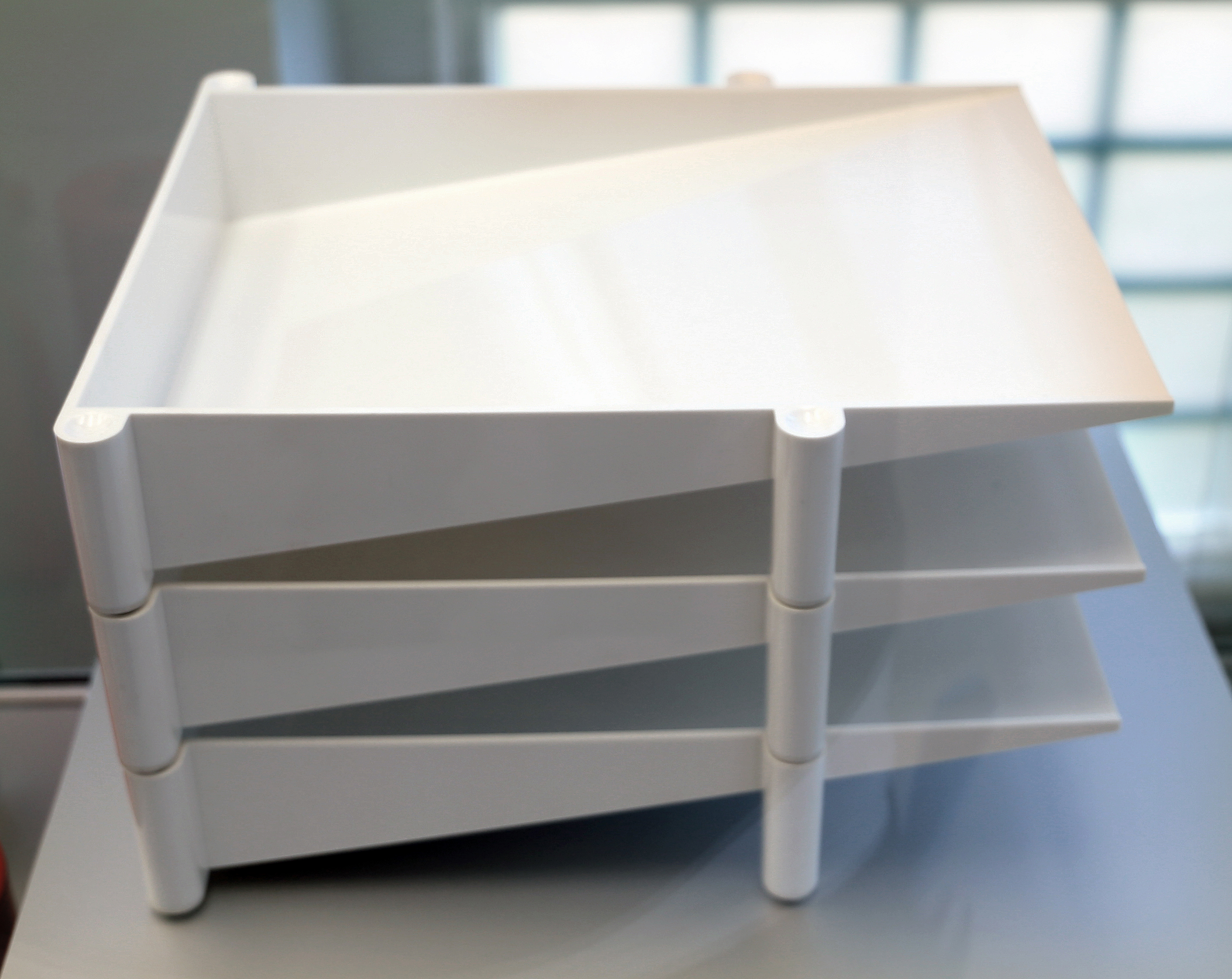
Sumatra paper tray for Danese (1976)

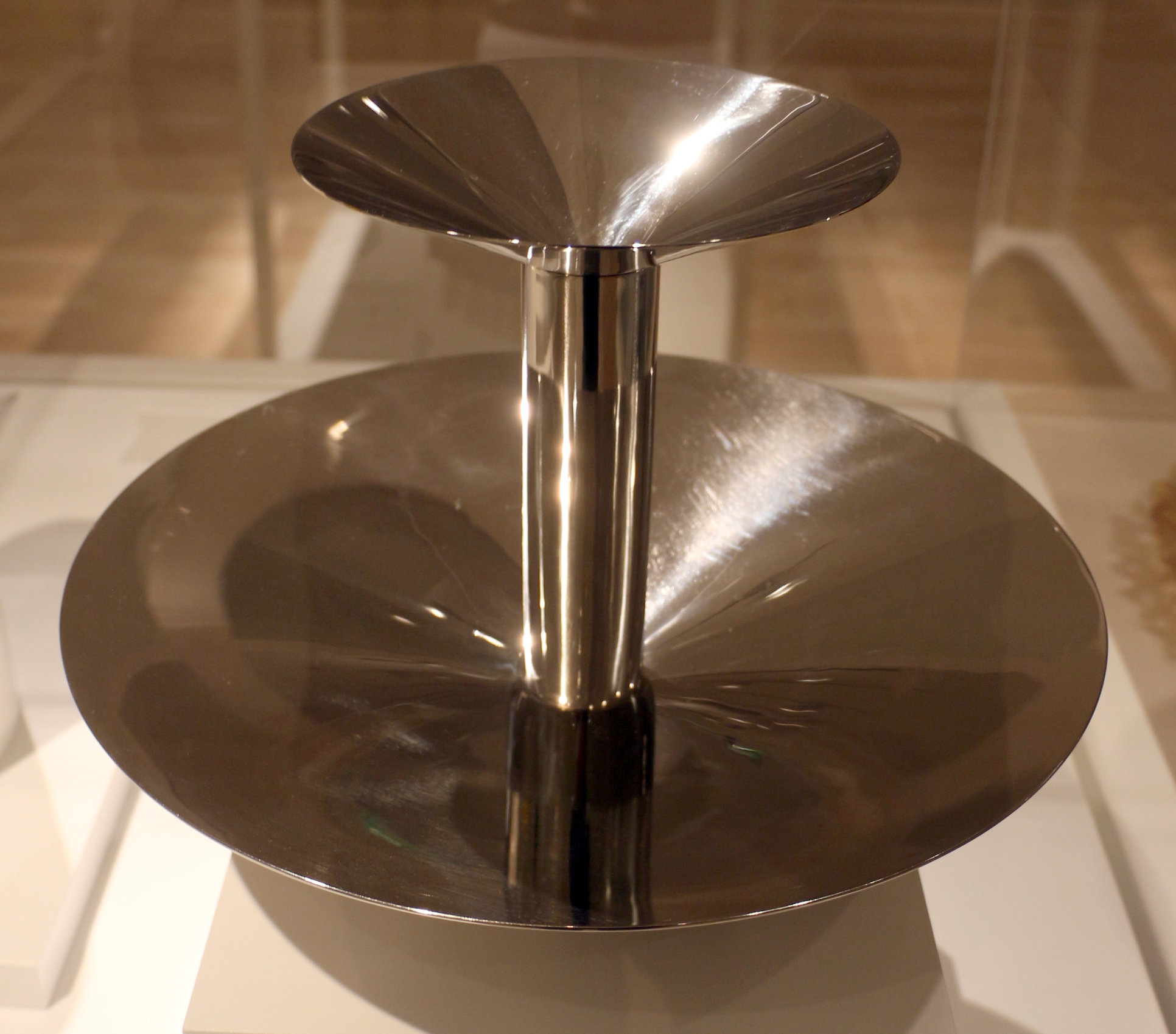
Centerpiece #1343/B Fruit Stand for Driade S.p.A, silver plated brass (1982)

He drew inspiration from the idealism of the Arts and Crafts movement and his political views as a communist.

From 1956 onward, he specialised in industrial design and created a portfolio of more than 2,000 works. In the 1960s, he published a series of books with his then-wife Iela Mari, including "The Apple and the Butterfly," a book of illustrations depicting the story of a caterpillar and an apple, without any text.

In the 1970s, as a professor at The Humanitarian Society, he founded the Nuova Tendenza art movement in Milan. Also in that decade, he designed the Sof Sof chair and the "Box" chair. In 1974, in reaction to the mass production of furniture, Enzo Mari created a book entitled, Autoprogettazione, which deals with the DIY construction of furniture and provides plans and instructions on how to create 19 items of furniture from ubiquitous materials. In the 1980s, he designed the modernist Tonietta chair.

Mari also taught at University of Parma, the Accademia Carrara, and the Milan Polytechnic.

Multiple works by Mari have been on display at the Museum of Modern Art. He had retrospective shows in Turin, and an important presentation of his work in the "Adhocracy" show, during the first Istanbul Design Biennial. In addition, the Triennale, Milan, is exhibiting a tribute to Mari, curated by Hans Ulrich Obrist with Francesca Giacomelli.

He donated the archive of his designs to the city of Milan on the condition that it may not be displayed for 40 years.

== Personal life ==
Mari married children's book illustrator Iela Mari in 1955; they had two children, the writer Michele Mari and the musician Agostina Mari.

After separating in 1965, Enzo Mari remarried with art critic Lea Vergine in 1978. They had known each other since the 1960s. He died from COVID-19 on 19 October 2020, at the age of 88, during the COVID-19 pandemic in Italy. Lea Vergine died a day later, also from COVID-19.. They are survived by their daughter, psychologist Meta Mari.

== Publications ==
- "autoprogettazione?", 1974

== Awards and recognition ==
- 1967 Compasso d'Oro Award for individual research in design
- 1979 Compasso d'Oro Award for the "Delfina" chair
- 1987 Compasso d'Oro Award for the "Tonietta" chair
- 2001 Compasso d'Oro Award for the "Legato" table
- 2000 Honorary Royal Designer for Industry ("HonRDI" only 200 people may hold this title at any time.)
- 2002 Honorary Degree in Industrial Design, Politecnico di Milano, Faculty of Architecture
- 2011 Compasso d'Oro Career Award

== Selected quotes ==
- "Form is everything."
- "Design is dead."
- "I want to create models for a different society."
- "When I design an object and people say: 'Oh, well done!', I unfailingly ask myself, Where did I go wrong? ... If everybody likes it, it means I have confirmed the existing reality and this is precisely what I don't want."
