= Ketty La Rocca =

Italian artist (1938–1976)

- Born: 14 July 1938; La Spezia, Kingdom of Italy
- Died: 7 February 1976 (aged 37); Florence, Italy
- Known for: Body art, visual poetry

Ketty La Rocca (14 July 1938 – 7 February 1976) was an Italian artist. She was a leading exponent of body art and visual poetry movements.

Nowadays, The Estate Ketty La Rocca is managed by her son, Michelangelo Vasta, Professor of Economic History at the Department of Economics and Statistics, University of Siena.

== Work ==
The art of La Rocca comprises visual poetry, visual art, and performance. She explored language, images, and scenes of the everyday world. She emphasized the imagery of bodies.

Beginning in the 1970s, she mounted an extensive study of the human hand. She examined their potential for expression. She combined hands and words. She desired to create a different language, a more visceral communion in which the physical body, gestures and the written word were intertwined. In connection with these works, La Rocca made specific reference to the female life experience, which had only ascribed certain activities to women’s hands. In 1974, she wrote from a feminist perspective: “For women today is not a time of explanations. They have a lot to do, and then they only have one language at their disposal, which is alien and inimical to them. They are robbed of everything, except of the things that no one notices, and those are manifold, even if they must be arranged. Hands, for instance, are too slow for female skills, too poor and too incapable of continuing to hoard. It is better to embroider with words...“

Near the end of her career, La Rocca worked in "Riduzioni" (reductions), in which she transforms a common photograph, such as a family or individual portrait, into something more graphic. She alters the picture using graphic contouring of the image or by other distortions, often involving written words.

La Rocca debuted in the early 1960s as a poet, and eventually combined her poetic sense with the visual sense. Besides her experience with concrete poetry, she produced, in line with the visual poetry of Gruppo 70, to which she belonged, her collages, a set of images and words taken from newspapers and magazines and recombined in critical forms.

Starting from the late 1960s and early 1970s, she examined the universe of communication, using innovations including videotapes, installation and performance. During this time she created several works in black PVC plastic, often reproducing single letters of the alphabet and punctuation marks (mainly the comma), and various objects in metal and mirror.

After that time, La Rocca developed the idea of a body-language, or of a body turned into language. She used pictures of human hands making simple gestures. Her initial steps during this phase included her book "In principio erat" (1971), which Lea Vergine cited as one of the fundamental experiences of Italian body art; and La Rocca's video “Appendice per una supplica”, shown for the first time at the 1972 Venice Biennale.

She then began using words written in rapid cursive on the images of hands (see, for example, "Le mie parole e tu?", 1971). This was the common trait of two main series produced by Ketty La Rocca in the last years of her life: the "riduzioni" and the "craniologie". In the former works, she developed her signature body of work, and passage after passage, with a gradual transfiguration, the images dissolve — through the act of writing — to the point where they become pure abstraction. In the "craniologie" she used the word "you", written on the reproductions of x-rays of a skull, where the image of a hand or a finger was superimposed on the cranial cavity. La Rocca constructed her unique aesthetic language working with materials as different as the letters of the alphabet, hand gestures, x-rays of a skull, and the practice of automatic writing.

La Rocca died of cancer in 1976 at the age of 38. After her death, La Rocca's works have gained international notice. Several retrospectives have been organized in Italy, Europe and the United States, in public and private spaces, such as:

- Centre d’Art Contemporain Genève (1992)
- Galleria Emi Fontana, Milano (1994)
- Kunstlerhaus Stuttgart (1995)
- Kunsthalle Wien, Vienna, Austria (1995)
- College Marcel Duchamp, Chateauroux (1996)
- Fondazione Carispezia|Fondazione Cassa di Risparmio della Spezia, La Spezia (1999)
- Palazzo delle Esposizioni, Rome (2001)
- Monsummano Terme (2001)
- Palazzo Fabroni, Pistoia (2002)
- Los Angeles Istituto Italiano di Cultura (2002)
- Galleria Emi Fontana, Milan (2005)
- MART, Rovereto (2007)
- MOCA, Los Angeles (2007) during the exhibition of WACK! Art and the Feminist Revolution.
- Palazzo Grassi, Venice, Italy (2008)
- Villa Romana, Florence (2012)
- Galleria Martano, Turin (2011)
- Galerie Kadel Willborn, Düsseldorf (2014)
- Wilkinson Gallery, London (2014)
- Wilkinson Gallery, London (2016)
- La Virreina, Barcelona (2017)
- Estorick Collection of Modern Italian Art, London, England (2025)

One piece of La Rocca's work was acquired by the Uffizi, for exhibition in its wing of the Corridoio Vasariano.

== Museum collections ==
Ketty La Rocca's works are exhibited in the most important museums in the world:

- Museum am Ostwall, Dortmund, DE
- Museum of Contemporary Art, Los Angeles, US
- Galleria degli Uffizi, Florence, IT
- ZKM, Centre of Art and Media, Karlsruhe, DE
- Galleria Civica d’Arte Moderna (GAM), Turin, IT
- Centro Arte Moderna e Contemporanea della Spezia, La Spezia, IT
- Museo di Arte Moderna e Contemporanea di Trento e Rovereto (MART), Rovereto, IT
- Museo D’arte Contemporanea Roma (MACRO), Rome, IT
- Galleria Nazionale d’Arte Moderna (GNAM), Rome, IT
- Centre Pompidou, Paris, FR
- Museum of Modern Art (MoMA), New York, US

== Selected bibliography ==
- Il mito ci sommerge (1966), Ed. Sampietro, Bologna
- In principio erat (1971), Ed. Centro Di, Florence
- Appendice per una supplica (1972), Ed. Museum Am Ostwall, Dortmund
- Ketty La Rocca, Monografia (1975), Ed. Museum Am Ostwall, Dortmund
- Ketty La Rocca, Catalogo retrospettiva (1989), Ed. Carini, Florence
- Ketty La Rocca, CD-Rom (1998)
- Ketty La Rocca, Fondazione Cassa di Risparmio La Spezia (1999)
- Omaggio a Ketty La Rocca, Pacini Editore, Pisa (2001)
- Ketty La Rocca, Galerie im Taxispalais, Innsbruck (2003)
- Ketty La Rocca: I suoi scritti, a cura di Lucilla Saccà, Martano Editore, Turin (2005)
- AA. VV., Wack! Art and the Feminist Revolution, exh. cat., The Museum of Contemporary Art, L.A. and The MITT PRESS, Cambridge (2007), pp. 114–15, 289
- AA.VV., Italics. Arte italiana fra tradizione e rivoluzione 1968–2008, exh. cat., Mondadori Electa, Milano (2008), p. 101
- Del Becaro, Elena, Intermedialità al femminile: l’opera di Ketty La Rocca, Mondadori Electa, Milano (2008)
- Rebelle. Art & Feminism 1969–2009, (exh. Cat), MMKA, Arnhem, NL, pp. 220–221 (2009)
- Donna: Avanguardia Femminista negli anni ’70 dalla Sammlung Verbund di Vienna, (exh. Cat), Galleria nazionale d’arte moderna, Rome (2010), pp. 46–55, Electa.
- Simone Marsi, Perdersi dentro casa. La storia che ha commosso il mondo di Ketty La Rocca, in Arabeschi, n. 15, 2020, pp. 127-138. URL: http://www.arabeschi.it/numbers/arabeschi-n-15/

== See also ==
- 1974 Luigi Carluccio, Ketty La Rocca, Panorama, n. 421, 16/05/1974.
- 1976 Lucy R. Lippard, The Pains and Pleasures of Rebirth: Women’s Body Art, Art in America, n. 3, May–June 1976.
- 1990 Maria Luisa Frisa, Ketty La Rocca, Flash Art, n.155, aprile–maggio 1990, p.138.
- 1993 Judith Russi Kirshner, You and I, The Art of Ketty La Rocca, Artforum International, March 1993, pp. 80–83.
- 1995 Body as site at Kunsthalle, Flash Art International, 1995.
- 1996 Il corpo come luogo alla Kunsthalle, Flash Art, n. 196, Febbraio-Marzo 1996, p.39.
- 1996 Giorgio Verzotti, Ketty La Rocca,” c’est elle qui souligne”, Blocnotes, Janvier- Fevrier 1996, pp. 54–59 e Ketty La Rocca “Emphasis Hers” pp. 115–119.
- 2002 Peter Frank, Ketty La Rocca, LA Weekly, April 26 – May 2, 2002, p. 142.
- 2005 Alberto Mugnaini, Ketty La Rocca. Emi Fontana, Flash Art, n. 255, Dicembre 2005 – Gennaio 2006, p. 97.
- 2006 Francesca Pasini, Ketty La Rocca. Galleria Emi Fontana, Tema Celeste, n. 113, Gennaio-Febbraio 2006, p. 99.
- 2006 Daniela Palazzoli, Scritti di Ketty La Rocca, Arte & Critica, n. 46, Aprile-Giugno 2006, p. 87.
- 2007 Los Angeles. “Wack! Art and Feminist Revolution”, Flash Art International, n. 253, March–April 2007, p. 69.
- 2009 Chiara Bertola, Italics, Flash Art International, n. 264, January–February 2009, p. 96.
- 2010 Simone Menegoi, The Space Between Me and You, Kaleidoscope, n. 6, April – May 2010, pp. 104–109.
