= Carol Rama =

Italian painter (1918–2015)

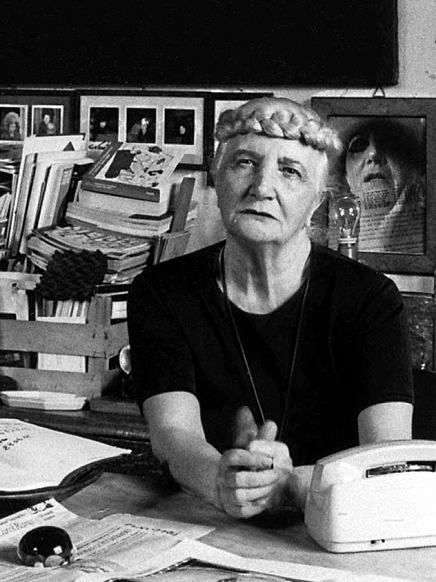
- Born: Olga Carolina Rama; 17 April 1918; Turin, Italy
- Died: 25 September 2015 (aged 97); Turin, Italy
- Education: Self-taught
- Known for: Painting, bricolage
- Website: archiviocarolrama.org

Olga Carolina "Carol" Rama (17 April 1918 – 25 September 2015) was an Italian self-taught artist. Her painting encompassed an erotic, and sexual identity with specific references to female sensuality. She began to paint around the mid-thirties and exhibiting her work ten years later. Her work was relatively little known until curator Lea Vergine included several pieces in a 1980 exhibition, prompting Rama to revisit her earlier watercolour style.

== Biography ==
Born on 17 April 1918, Olga Carolina Rama was the youngest of three children born to Marta (née Pugliaro) and Amabile Rama, who had just returned to Turin the year before their daughter's birth after a six-year stint as migrant workers in Argentina. Much of Rama's earliest frame of reference comes from factory life. Through much of the 1920s, the business and the family prospered. Rama took riding lessons. She remembered it as a carefree time during which the family sang operatic arias and played dress-up at home. Her father, Amabile Rama, was a small-scale manufacturer in the engineering industry who produced automobiles under the trademark "Sintesi" as well as unusual unisex bicycles under the trademark "OLT". Among those working in his factory, at Via Digione 17 in Turin, there was a model employee, Vittorio Valletta, who in 1927 left "Sintesi" to place his talents at the service of FIAT. And it was following the birth of the FIAT that her father's company began to go downhill, and was declared bankrupt while Carol was still a child. Hard years followed for the previously prosperous Rama family. Her once secure middle-class family was socially marginalized. Gone were the afternoons of singing operatic arias and taking riding lessons. Rama said, "I started to experience rejection and derision from the same circles that had showered me with privileges before." Carol Rama's mother, Marta was committed to a psychiatric hospital in 1933; Rama was 15 years old. Six years later, Amabile, Rama's father, committed suicide.

Rama was still forming herself as a young woman during her mother's mental breakdown. Frequent visits to the asylum proved decisive: "I felt comfortable in that surrounding. Because it's there I began to have manners and upbringing without either cultural preparation or etiquette". Observing the unusual, quixotic characters in the asylum and absorbing that atmosphere has a liberating effect on the budding artist, which would inform her whole aesthetic and worldview. Rama had enrolled at the art academy but school would not be her path forward; she skipped class and dropped out. Right off the bat she intuitively possessed her own self-assured style, line quality, subject matter, and twisted perspective. Specificity of vision, brazenly expressed, distinguishes Rama's earliest works.

== Work ==
Rama's work is in the collection of the Barcelona Museum of Contemporary Art, the Museum of Modern Art, the Stedelijk Museum Amsterdam,

In 1980 Rama's work was included in the exhibition of women artists, L’altra metà dell’avanguardia (The Other Half of the Avant-Garde), held at the Palazzo Reale in Milan and curated by Lea Vergine. In 2004 a retrospective of Rama's work was held at the Fondazione Sandretto Re Rebaudengo in Turin, In 2009 the Galerie Isabella Bortolozzi in Berlin held a retrospective. In 2015 the Musée d'Art Moderne de Paris held a retrospective. In 2017 the New Museum held a retrospective entitled Carol Rama: Antibodies. In 2023 her work was included in the exhibition Action, Gesture, Paint: Women Artists and Global Abstraction 1940-1970 at the Whitechapel Gallery in London.

== Art practice ==
As a painter, Rama began with sex and with watercolour. Infused with inwardness, watercolour has an intimate relation to the painter's body, with brushwork that tends to revolve around hand and wrist action, much like writing; its scale suited Rama's tabletop home-studio set-up. A medium of dilution and pollution, bleeding and spillage, watercolour was just the right thing for the then-young artist fascinated by bodies, orifices, fluids, and their intersubjective exchange. Colour in her early watercolours is generally applied sparingly, in pale washes or barely at all, with strategic, vivid punctuations that draws attention to key erogenous zones: mouths, tongues, nipples, cunts, dicks, and assholes- wet holes and erotic plumbing primed for liquid flow. Of all the orifices, the mouth is Rama's favourite, as it is the most representative of desire. Her watercolours redesign anatomies, amputate and reorder limbs, realign orifices, and scramble physiological functions. Her women are often depicted armless, legless, or both, appearing broken like damaged classical ruins from Italy's ancient past.

At the end of the thirties, Carol Rama also painted some twenty oils on canvas with a less scabrous content, as if her message had been influenced by the more conventional medium. They are most of all self-portraits in which the coulees are at first laid on flat, in a manner that recalls some of Felice Castorati's early paintings, but the features are stylized to such an extent that they disappear, reducing the face and the body to mere splotches of lumpy paint.

The work of Carol Rama was also the object of what we could call a psychopathological reduction. Throughout the 19th century and a large part of the 20th, the art produced by sexual and political minorities and those of functional and cognitive diversity have been strained by epistemological-political taxonomies.

In 1945, Rama mounted her solo debut at Galleria Faber in Turin, exhibiting a range of early watercolours. But the show was not seen. It was immediately censored, shut down by police for its obscene, abject, and all-around exuberantly offensive imagery before it could open to the public. Chronically excessive and too much for the scene to handle, Rama could continue to fall outside authorized spheres of visibility and slip through cracks between official categories. Throughout her long life in art, she fluently navigated along the margins and shifted positions across movements as a rogue agent, while consistently affirming her presence: she exhibited regularly for over half a century, presenting solo shows nearly every year, mostly in northern Italy, with rare breaks of more than a few years. Rama's oversexed, vulgar, dirty, and disfigured bodies roiled propriety and uptight norms, directly challenging the far-right national politics of the day.

By the early 1950s, she was painting irregular geometric compositions of lilting rhomboids and squares, often connected by long spidery lines or forming a directional field of implied movement. Books on her shelf from that time confirm formal affinities with Klee and Kandinsky as well as the influence of Cubism, especially Picasso, whose major exhibition in Milan in 1953 sent ripples across the Italian scene. Within the decade, her abstraction evolved into more painterly, impastoed, gestural canvases streaked with dark, textured forms that read as wounds or scars. An example of this would be a black monochrome she painted called Melodramma (1960). Around the mid-fifties, Rama began to undo little by little the geometric conventions of the concrete art. Movement while also experimenting with new materials and techniques. Carol Rama invents organic abstraction, surrealism, concrete visceral art and porno brut. Carol Rama was profoundly influenced throughout the sixties by the experimental linguistic and visual poetry movement of Novissimi. Many of the writers of this movement reclaimed the "feminine" gaze as a tool for critiquing the dominant ideology, the scene was paradoxically male.

Starting in 1970, Rama began incorporating bicycle inner tubes into her work. She cut them up, splayed them out flat, hung them dangling off painting, and draped them limply over sculptural structures, flaccid bunches of long, hollow piping. The tyres, ranging in colour from black to rich rusty ocher, would always be associated with memories of her dead father and his factory, but formally they also echo the crowded multiplicity of dicks and snakes in her early watercolours, as well as more general signifiers of mobility, circulation, plumbing, and detumescence. With titles like Le Guerra e astratta [War is Abstract], Arsenale [Arsenal], and Presagi di Birnam [Omens of Birnam], Rama's rubber collages and assemblages are framed in relation to martial power, rubble, mass weaponry, and mass death.

After more than thirty years of concocting virulent strains of abstraction, Rama returned to figuration. in 1979, her perversions of the 1930s and 1940s, previously censored by the authorities, were finally seen for the first time in an exhibition of a dozen early watercolours at Galleria Matano in Turin. Amid her return to figurative picture-making, which lasted until her death in 2015 at age 97, Rama became fascinated with the mad cow outbreak [Bovine Spongiform Encephalopathy] that spiralled into a global media frenzy in the late nineties. She made a series of collaged paintings called La Mucca Pazza [The Mad Cow], dominated by bloated udder shapes cut out of leather and rubber and arranged on used mail sacks.

== Her studio ==
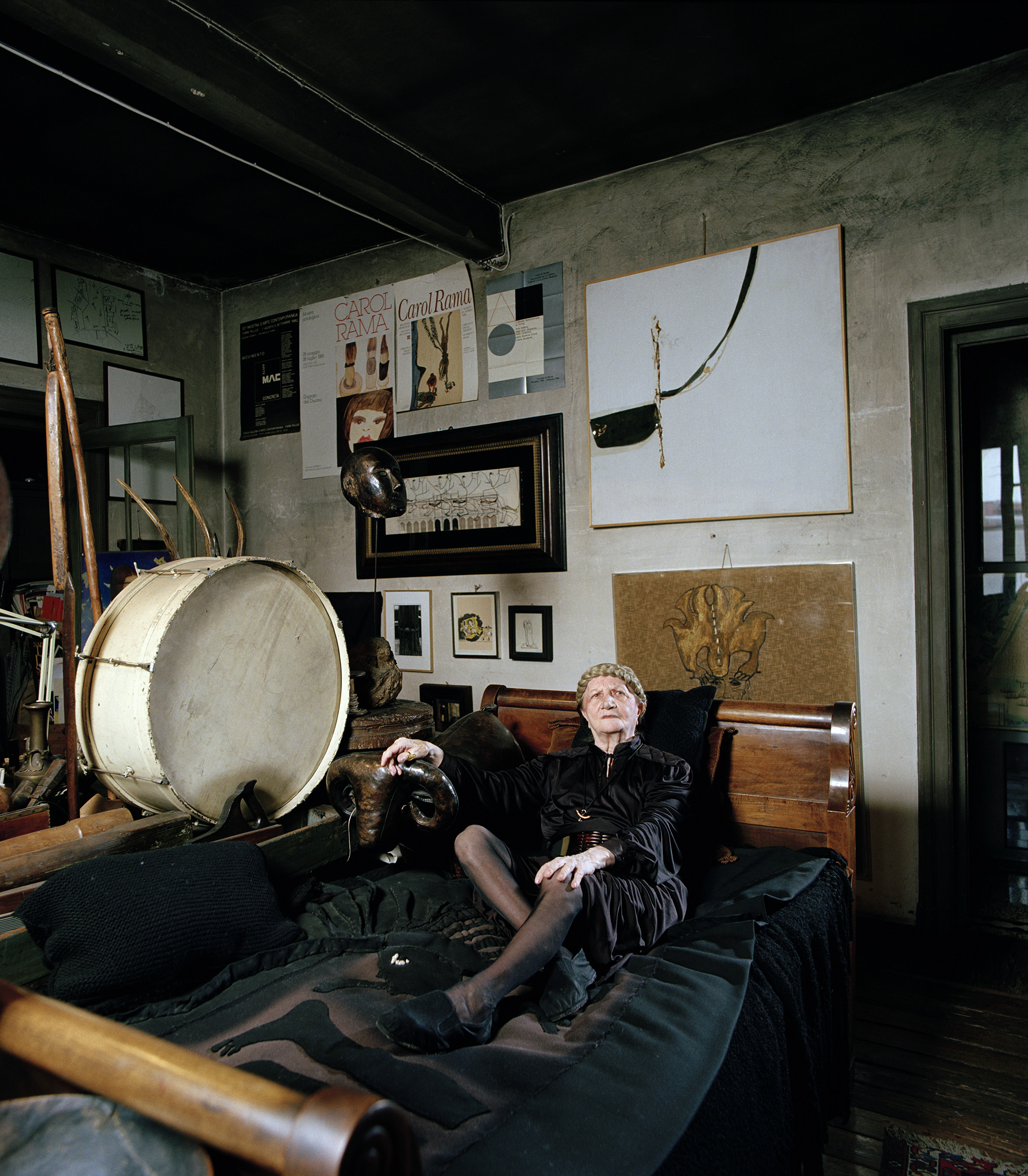
Carol Rama photographed by Oliver Mark in her studio, Turin 2003

Heavy black curtains were drawn over her windows. She stated: "Black is the colour that will help me to die. I'd like to paint everything black, it's a kind of incineration, a kind of wonderful agony..." The apartment's ceilings are high and dark. Charcoal grey and stale beige walls work with the dark wood floors, doors, furniture, and artefacts to further shade the rooms. Dwelling is this apartment at Via Napione 15 in Turin for over seventy years, Rama's studio home became an extension of herself, her persona, and her singular artistic visions. On one set day a week, she used to open up her workshop abode to friends and intellectuals.

Her home was filled with many objects, art pieces, and art materials.

== Popular culture ==
Her name appears in the lyrics of the Le Tigre song "Hot Topic."
