= Dimore di tutto ciò che è divinissimo e santissimo =

Dimore di tutto ciò che è divinissimo e santissimo is a sculpture by Mafonso about the town of Capua installed in the Baden Powell public garden in 2010.

The sculpture was plasma cut from 30mm sheets of weathering steel and measures 380x145x200 cm.

== History ==
The work, titled from a passage in Plato's Timaeus, is born from the Mafonso for the human head. This and 'a central element in his poetry, a theme that the artist has here treated with a ternary representation modulated on three shaped profiles and almost engraved in steel,' 'drawing' 'at the same time light and obligations that arise from the rough metal material scraped and left in the vividness of its harshness'.

== Critical aspect ==
"Reaching the center of the Idea through a long way of sublimation and purification of the image, reaching the hot nucleus of the representation through a path manual, intellectual and spiritual at the same time. These are the prerequisites that have always inspired and characterized the Mafonso's long walk of research - from the cycle "Alla maniera degli altri"(1972) until "Dimore" from the last years - although in his contemporaneity is the result of a strict classic vision of the Renaissanceof the artwork, is also the result of a conception based on the irreplaceable basis of the drawing that becomes the way of give a first tangible form of the idea that is born in the artist's mind like a divine spark. No wonder if Mafonso conserves an ancient neo-Platonic heritage in his own conception of art that is based on the superior spark trying to keep alive the utopia of give sense to the world through the creative mechanism of his own work. Mafonso starts from a weave of signs crossing each other like a mythological forge in a net from which originates a knit soft and incumbent, the subtle texture and the structure of the binds that form the absolute system of a mechanism complex and exemplary at the same time. This system of the drawing originates all the Mafonso's work and represents the conceptual and stylistic basis of his work in his many declensions, from the painting to the installations" (Lorenzo Canova)

== Bibliography ==
- Canova, Lorenzo (2011). Dimore di tutto ciò che è divinissimo e santissimo. http://www.premioceleste.it/ita_artista_news/idu:45122/idn:9559/
- Carmine Antropoli e jolanda Capriglione (curated) Capua le piazze dell'arte (e dintorni) Mafonso Dimore di tutto ciò che è divinissimo e santissimo book ARTETETRA edition pg 86-89 ISBN 978-88-99443-16-0
