= Cesare Berlingeri =

Italian contemporary artist (born 1948)

- Cesare Berlingeri
- Born: 1948 (age 77–78); Cittanova, Italy
- Known for: Drawing, Painting, Sculpture
- Notable work: paintings, sculptures, performance
- Movement: contemporary art

Cesare Berlingeri (born 1948) is an Italian contemporary artist, mostly known for his folded paintings

== Artistic career, the first stages ==
In 1968 Berlinghieri made several trips around Europe, met other artists and became better acquainted with the world of contemporary culture. In Rome, in the 1970s. he began working for the theatre and television (also with RAI, the Italian public national television). In these artistic phase he sought an expressive path of his own by experimenting different methods and ways of painting, using natural elements such as wind, rain and fire – a means of introducing randomness and materials such as lime, cement, waste paper and canvas. In the late ‘70s he began working on the “Trasparenze”, which followed the “Strappi” cycle, reconfirming his constantly evolving-transforming study on canvas. The Trasparenze represent “research into canvas and its penetrability, on the visibility of what is beyond the fabric: an attempt not to make the visibility system stiff” C. Benincasa. These works consist of ultra-light and superimposed linen canvases, meaning the superimposition of transparent surfaces that make reference the one to the other and do not hide the colour fragments and small folded fabrics they enclose. This cycle was presented in 1979 at the Soligo Gallery in Rome and at the City Gallery of Saint Vincent. C. Vivaldi mentioned the artist in the Bolaffi catalogue (1980) as follows: ”I have pleasure in presenting a young artist from Calabria who, though living in a small town, fits perfectly into the mainstream of international culture. This is an artist with a sure future.” In 1985, he participated in the exhibition entitled “5 mosaici per 5 artisti”, together with Mario Schifano, Mafonso, Parres and Tano Festa. During the ‘80s and ‘90s theatre cooperation intensified in the fields of installations, sets and costumes design.

== The Master of the “Piegature” ==
The folded paintings were exhibited in 1990, after a meeting with Tommaso Trini who wrote: ”I remember that when I visited the Taurianova workshop, during the preparation of a large exhibition at Messina, Berlingeri was still debating the puzzlement of his supporters, most of whom were convinced that “those objects” were out of style. But I was straight away excited”. “Opere Recenti”, the exhibition to which Trini refers, was set up in the foyer of the Vittorio Emanuele Theatre, where a number of diptychs were exhibited together, for the first time, with the Piegature. These folded canvases, impregnated with pure pigment, drafted since 1976 in small sizes, were now recovered and developed. The Piegature idea comes from a memory of his childhood: a small mat black cloth wrapping which his mother used to wear around her neck as an amulet. But the actual folding of large paintings was first done in the theatre. While he was working on a stage set, he painted a starry night on a large backdrop. At the end of the play, when the time came to disassemble the set, he realized how, fold after fold, this large canvas became a package about eighty centimetres long.

== The “Corpi (bodies)” ==
In 2006 at MUDIMAdrie in Antwerp he presented the “Corpi”, bodies of air, covered by a smooth surface, generated from a matter “that acts like bread, meaning it breathes, inflates, grows like life, like the trees. And then the most beautiful thing is that three nails inserted here and there are all it takes to make this shape grow in a different way…” C. Berlingeri.

== Recent artistic collaborations ==
In 2012 he collaborated with the musician KK Null (founder of the band Zeni Geva) who created a site specific music for Berlingeri's installation “aria, acqua, terra, fuoco” presented for the first time at Centro culturale Altinate/San Gaetano, Padua, Italy.

== Exhibitions ==
Selected one-man Exhibitions
2012

- ”Cesare Berlingeri: Andar per stelle”, Centro Culturale San Gaetano, Padova.
- "Cesare Berlingeri: Ghiacci e ombre", La casa della memoria, Fondazione Mimmo Rotella, Catanzaro

2011

- “Cesare Berlingeri, Da oltremare al nero" Vecchiato Art Gallery, Padova.
- “Cesare Berlingeri, Lo spazio piegato" caffèguerbois galleriad'arte, Palermo.

2010

- “Cesare Berlingeri, Corpi e Piegature 2005–2010”, Galleria Ellebi, Cosenza.
- “Corpi & Piegature 2005–2010 – Cesare Berlingeri”, Vecchiato Art Galleries, Padova.
- "Rigorismo. Nell'orizzonte del transpazialismo ed oltre" curated by Flavio Lattuada. Lattuada Studio Milano

2009

- “Corpi Speciali”, Vecchiato Art Galleries, Milano.
- “Cesare Berlingeri – Piegare il colore”, Museo Civico Umberto Mastroianni, Marino, (RM).
- “Cesare Berlingeri – Piegare la pittura” CAMS, FESTIVART 2009, UNIVERSITA’ DELLA CALABRIA, Cosenza.
- “Cesare Berlingeri - Piegare l’ombra”, La nube di Oort, Roma.
- “Cesare Berlingeri”, Vecchiato Art Galleries, Porto Cervo.
- “Cesare Berlingeri Casseforti dell’anima”, Galleria d’arte Arte Contemporanea e Dintorni, Como.
- “Italian Shape: Berlingeri”, ANNIART 798 Art Zone, Beijing.

2008

- “Costellazione. Un polittico per Cosenza”, curated by P. Aita. Vertigo Arte, Cosenza.
- “Cesare Berlingeri. Piegare la pittura”, Castello Castani, Comune di Fondi.

2007

- “Cesare Berlingeri Vele per nessun mare”, curated by P. Aita. Galleria Vecchiato, Padova.
- “Cesare Berlingeri”, curated by Aguinaldo Coelho e Celso Fioravante. Museu de Arte Contemporânea Goiânia Centro cultural Oscar Niemeyer. Brasil.
- “Cesare Berlingeri”, curated by Aguinaldo Coelho e Celso Fioravante. Museu de Arte Moderna da Bahia. Brasil.
- “Cesare Berlingeri”, curated by Aguinaldo Coelho e Celso Fioravante. Museu de Arte Moderna. Rio de Janeiro. Brasil.

2006

- “Cesare Berlingeri Corpi”, MUDIMAdrie. Antwerp.
- “Cesare Berlingeri La pittura piegata”. Galleria De Nisi, Caserta.
- “Cesare Berlingeri Avvolti”, curated by P. Aita. Vertigo Arte, Cosenza.

2005

- “La pittura piegata” curated by V. Baradel. Castello Aragonese Reggio Calabria.
- “Cesare Berlingeri 1980–2005” curated by Philippe Daverio e D. von Drathen. Complesso monumentale di San Giovanni, Catanzaro.

2004

- “Opere recenti” galleria Marchina Arte Contemporanea, Brescia.

2003–2004

- “Cesare Berlingeri 1963–2003”, Comune di Cittanova (RC).

2003

- “Viaggi”, Mole Vanvitelliana, Ancona.
- "La pittura piegata", ex Scuderie Palazzo Moroni, Padova.
- Galleria d'Arte Vecchiato, Padova.

2002

- "Questa è la mia più bella piegatura per avvolgere un critico", Galleria d'Arte Dante Vecchiato, Padova.

2001

- "Dipinti Piegati", New Art Gallery, Padova.

2000

- Fondazione MudimaDue, Milano.

1999

- Fondazione Mudima, Milano, curated by T. Trini.

1998

- Studio Soligo, Roma

1995

- "Piegare il colore", Studio Soligo, Roma.
- "Viaggi", Galleria La Polena, Genova.
- Se Art Gallery, Tokyo.

1994

- "Artefiera", Bologna; Galleria La Polena, Genova.
- "Piegare la notte", large installation, Fondazione Mudima, Milano.

1993

- "Piegature / Oltre", Galleria Mosaico, Messina.
- Galleria La Polena, Genova.

1991

- "Piegature", Studio Soligo, Roma.
- Official manifesto TAORMINA ARTE '91.

1990–1991

- "Opere recenti", curated by T. Trini, L. Barbera, Teatro Vittorio Emanuele, Messina.

1990

- "Progetto per l'Arte Moderna", Studio Soligo, Roma.
- Fortezza da Basso, Firenze.

1989

- "Nero, Bianco, Rosso, Blu", curated by F. Gallo, Galleria d'Arte Moderna, Paternò (CT).
- Galleria Gregoriana, Roma.
- Studio Soligo, Roma.

1988

- "Languida attesa", intervento d'immagine per una composizione musicale di A. Cananzi, Palazzo Taverna, Roma.

1987

- "Specchio rotto specchio", Studio Soligo, Roma.
- "Specchio rotto specchio", Galleria d'Arti Visive LAV, Reggio Calabria.

1985 "Fioriture", Studio Soligo, Roma.

- Galleria Studio Oggetto, Caserta.

1982

- "Dodici frammenti e un quadro", Galleria Il Messaggio, Reggio Calabria.
- Galleria La Meridiana, Messina.
- "Racconti colorati", Galleria Interarte, Milano

1981

- Installation of “La lunga notte di Medea”, direction by Werner Schroeter, teatro Niccolini, Firenze.

1980

- "Parnaso", Galleria Interarte, Milano.

1979

- Galleria Civica, Saint-Vincent.
- Expo Arte, Studio Soligo, Roma.
- Galleria Ita Incontri, Forte dei Marmi.

1978

- "Trasparenze", Galleria Soligo, Roma.

1976

- "Quattro tempi: intervento pittorico e gestuale per la piazza", Reggio Calabria.

1975

- Galleria AxA, Firenze.

1974

- Installation for Momenti d’inferno, via Popilia, Cosenza.

== Bibliography ==
2012

- Luca Beatrice, exhibition catalogue, Cesare Berlingeri “Andar per stelle”, Padova, Vecchiato Art Galleries.
- M.Meneguzzo, T.Coltellaro, exhibition catalogue, Cesare Berlingeri "Ghiacci e ombre", Catanzaro, Prearo Editore.

2010

- A. Jones, exhibition catalogue Cesare Berlingeri: Corpi e Piegature 2005–2010.
- F. Miglietta, exhibition catalogue Cesare Berlingeri: Corpi e Piegature 2005–2010.

2009

- P. Aita, exhibition catalogue “Peripezie dell’identità – Il caso Byron”.
- V. Biasi, exhibition catalogue 6ª Biennale Libro d’Artista, città di Cassino.
- D. Maestosi, exhibition catalogue “Piegare il colore”.
- T. Coltellaro, in “il Lamentino” n. 130 October.
- T. Coltellaro, Berlingeri le pieghe che diventano corpi, in “Calabria ora” November, 25.
- S. Russo, CesareBerlingeri e la sua pittura piegata, in “Eventi Culturali”, n. 10 October.
- A. Sanna, exhibition catalogue “Il festino degli dei – 18 sapori d’artista”.
- M. De Candia, exhibition catalogue “Piegare l’ombra”.
- D. Maestosi, in “Il Messaggero”, May, 29
- P. Aita, exhibition catalogue “Piegare la pittura”.
- D. De Nisi, Cesare gran maestro, in “ARTEiN” year XXII, n. 119.

2008

- R. Ramos, Peças sentimentais, in “Jornal da Brasil” January, 28.
- S. Velasco, Telas dobradas por milagres mundanos, in “O Globo”, January, 1
- R. Ramos, Arte dobrada, in “Jornal do Brasil. Programma o guia de lazer mais completo da cidade”
- D. De Nisi, “E.V.A. Experience of Visual Attraction”, exhibition catalogue, Galleria De Nisi DeniArte, Roma.
- P. Aita, Isole nella tormenta, exhibition catalogue, La Nube di Oort, Roma.
- Z. Daniele, Cesare Berlingeri La pittura piegata, exhibition catalogue, Comune di Fondi.
- D. De Nisi, Cesare Berlingeri. Cinque Pensieri, exhibition catalogue, Comune di Fondi.

2007

- P. Aita, Vele per nessun mare, exhibition catalogue, Galleria Vecchiato, Padova.
- T. Trini, L’estensione delle piegature, exhibition catalogue, Museu de Goiânia, Museu de Arte Moderna da Bahia, Museu de Arte Moderna Rio de Janeiro.
- C. Fioravante, Intervista. Alla ricerca del silenzio assoluto, exhibition catalogue, Museu de Goiânia, Museu de Arte Moderna da Bahia, Museu de Arte Moderna Rio de Janeiro.
- A. Lisboa, Cesare, o artista das dobraduras, in “O sucesso”, September 8
- I. Marques, Sentidos e expressões em camadas, in “Correiro da Bahia”, November 4

2006

- G. Ranzi exhibition catalogue, Mudimadrie, Anversa.
- G. Grilli, exhibition catalogue, galleria De Nisi, Caserta.
- 57° Premio Michetti Laboratorio Italia, catalogue by Philippe Daverio, ed. Vallecchi
- P. Aita, exhibition catalogue Vertigo Arte, Cosenza.
- F. Gordano e D. Pieroni, Buio luminoso, exhibition catalogue. Vertigo Arte, Cosenza.

2005

- V. Baradel, exhibition's catalogue, castello Aragonese, Reggio Calabria
- L. Barbera, exhibition catalogue, ex macello, Villa San Giovanni (RC).
- P. Daverio, D. Von Drathen e una conversazione tra G. Ranzi e Cesare Berlingeri. exhibition catalogue, complesso monumentale di San Giovanni, Catanzaro.

2004

- C. Zanetti, exhibition catalogue, Marchina Arte contemporanea, Brescia.

2003

- T. Trini, exhibition catalogue. Intervista di Arturo Schwarz. Scritti di F. Menna, E. Longari. Catalogo Skira, comune di Padova. Comune di Cittanova.

2002

- B. Martusciello e L. Bachis, Arte & successo. Ed. Maretti& Wilde Publisher

1999

- P. Aita, exhibition catalogue, Teatro dell'Acquario, Cosenza.
- T. Trini, exhibition catalogue, Fondazione Mudima, Milano.

1997

- 7 pittori per un solo poeta, Studio Soligo, Roma.
- P. Aita, A. D'Elia, exhibition catalogue, Castello Svevo, Cosenza.

1994

- M. Goj, I 100 pittori che fanno il mercato, in "Espansione", Mondadori Editore, September 9

1993

- G. Beringheli, Forme e colori in "la Repubblica", April 21.
- T. Trini, Il buio piegato, in "Art in Italy", n. 1, Adriano Parise editore, Verona.

1992

- G. M. Bonifati, Ordine e disordine estetico, Eurasia editore.

1991

- M. de Candia, Ecco le piegature. Il piacere dell'occhio, in "la Repubblica", April 11.

1990–1991

- T. Trini, L. Barbera, C. Casorati, exhibition catalogue, Teatro Vittorio Emanuele, Messina, Electa, Milano.

1990

- B. Tosi, exhibition catalogue, Galleria Gregoriana, Roma.

1989

- L. Lambertini, mention in Catalogo dell’Arte Moderna, Mondadori, Milano.
- Questarte. Le mostre in Italia, Eugenio Riccitelli editore, Pescara.
- F. Gallo, E. Longari, exhibition catalogue, Galleria d'Arte Moderna, Paternò (CT), Fabbri Editori, Milano.

1987

- C. Capua, exhibition catalogue, Galleria d'Arti Visive LAV, Reggio Calabria.
- F. Gallo, Specchio rotto specchio, exhibition catalogue, Studio Soligo, Roma.

1986

- F. Miglietta, Ricognizione sud. Una possible campionatura, in Catalogo XI Quadriennale Roma

1985

- F. Menna, Fioriture, exhibition catalogue, Studio Soligo, Roma.
- F. Miglietta, in "Avanti!".
- P. Levi, Arte a Roma, in "AD" . March.

1983

- T. Sicoli, Dai margnii…l’arte, exhibition catalogue, Cosenza.
- G. Selvaggi, foreword to Quattro litografie, quattro pittori (Rotella, Berlingeri, Enotrio, Turchiaro).

1982

- C. Benincasa, Racconti colorati, exhibition catalogue, Galleria Interarte, Milano.

1980

- C. Vivaldi, mention in Catalogo Bolaffi.
- C. Benincasa, Portale alla soglia del sapere, ed. del Tornese, Napoli.

1979

- C. Vivaldi, exhibition catalogue, Galleria Civica, Saint-Vincent.
- C. Benincasa, La tavola di Paro, Elettra, Roma.

1978

- C. Benincasa, in "Corriere della Sera", December 21.

1977

- R. De Monticelli, in "Corriere della Sera", March 31.

1975

- A. Di Laura, S. Giannattasio, exhibition catalogue, Galleria AxA, Firenze.

== Google Books bibliography ==
- Cesare Berlingeri. Piegare la pittura. Catalogo della mostra (Rende, 20 maggio-10 giugno 2009) - Rubbettino, 2009 - https://books.google.com/books?id=772bPgAACAAJ&q=BERLINGERI
- Cesare Berlingeri. Catalogo della mostra - Mudima, 1997 - https://books.google.com/books?id=73NuAAAACAAJ&q=BERLINGERI
- Cesare Berlingeri: materia - Skira, 2005 - https://books.google.com/books?id=3zVtAAAACAAJ&q=BERLINGERI
- Cesare Berlingeri. Corpi e piegature 2005-2010. - Rubbettino, 2010 - https://books.google.com/books?id=pBOnYgEACAAJ&q=BERLINGERI
- Cesare Berlingeri - Skira, 2003 - https://books.google.com/books?id=mG3FPQAACAAJ&q=BERLINGERI
- 57. Premio Michetti: laboratorio Italia – Editore Vallecchi, 2006 - https://books.google.com/books?id=9XhOAAAAYAAJ&q=BERLINGERI+MUDIMADRIE
