= Aldo Gentilini =

Italian painter and sculptor

Aldo Gentilini (7 February 1911 – 10 August 1982) was an Italian painter and sculptor. He was also the founder of the Christian Ranist movement.

== Biography ==
He followed the philosophy courses and for three years he lived in seclusion in a monastery in Pietrasanta under the advice of Don Orione. He was a great admirer of San Francesco D’Assisi and therefore he could not adapt to the conventional commercial system; his innumerable works were thus sold by him for little money. He was an artist practicing asceticism, to imitate the saint to whom he was devoted. The two natures, the human and the aesthetic, perfectly coincide in his tormented figure.

=== From Genoa to Courmayeur ===
Gentilini was born in Genoa on 7 February 1911, but Courmayeur, precisely in Portoud in Val Vení, where his family owned a hotel, was his adopted homeland, where he spent his youth. Of the period of Courmayeur are the "Totems", as the artist named his wooden creations, which recall something primitive and raw, rich in images and signs that show an instinctive force, an explosion of sensations still messy and confused.

=== The retreat in Volpeglino ===
In the early 1960s, Gentilini retired to Volpeglino, where he remained until his death on August 10, 1982, and, today, following a donation, the house-studio, in which he painted walls, doors, windows and furniture with furniture and objects built by assembling the most varied materials, belongs to the Municipality and could be transformed into a museum center dedicated to the artist's works.

=== His painting ===
His painting captures the moments, nuances of the soul, sensations that remain in a sign, in a hatch that vaguely recalls Miró with the decomposition of Picasso, Braque and Léger. It captures a characteristic of art and Fauvism (thus recalling Matisse) which suggests feelings and moods through the subjective and anti-naturalistic use of colors. His paintings are characterized by bright colors, strident and violent colors, developed in almost cubist compositions, in which the fillings of pure color create a dialectic that is projected out of the canvas, expressing the artist's moods in a genuine way, often of pain and despair, responding in color in the joy of living, a mystical and spiritual tension towards God who wants to communicate to the whole world. His pictorial sign is fast, decisive, like his gestures, essential and urgent, expressed characters expressed through the use of gouaches and acrylic colors.

He was very innovative in fact for his time, dedicating himself to painting with great transport, preferring the oil technique without neglecting the use of acrylic colors that date back to the years spent in Portud (Courmayeur), years where his sensitivity led him to observe and protect animals (like St. Francis) and take on the frog as a symbol of man. Thus he founded the Sect of the Ranists.

Painting and sculpture are the means of reaching mystically a revelation of the divine.

He was very prolific and had his heyday around the 1970s when his fame spanned regional borders to Switzerland.

Some evidence of his art can also be found in the frescoes and stained glass windows of the church of Santa Giulietta S. Colombano in Pavia, where his abstract figurative tale is made of lights, colors of spaces and rhythms.

=== Values of the Ranists ===
The frog is a symbol of man: it takes the momentum, makes a small jump and then falls to the ground to jump again, but it does not presume to detach itself from the world. So is man in his search for God. Man cannot move by himself, nor dominate matter.

Ranists are a group of ascetics who in divine contemplation and work find the completion and full realization of earthly life.

== Quotes ==
"I try to make the void – said Gentilini – This emptiness causes me a certain catharsis: I observe sensitive values that I respect, I re-evaluate them, but I never know how I will fall into the picture and this is the realization of a truth towards the sign never thought".

A talent moved thanks to the mother who believed in him: "... as a boy I drew very well. It was a childish drawing. It had characteristics above normal. Then I was started by mom, cared for above all by this mom, at the drawing. I started with drawing to move on to painting. When I felt that this talent was moving and could make up for every technique, I also abandoned drawing for painting ... "

From man to artist: “Everywhere I go I have an ideal citizenship. It is not for nothing that I spent ten years on the sidewalk, homeless, as reporters say, in search of human contacts, to better express in art the spirit of an era that is anything but twilight, even inclined to convert austerity from parade of the old architecture in free, aerial figurations. I come from the figurative, I am immensely interested in the 'beat' costume, which I consider the best of today's society "

Gentilini defined himself as not a painter but "inventor of shapes"

== Quotes about the author ==
The poet Curzia Ferrari wrote about him when he said that Aldo Gentilini was able to "unhinge men and objects to mix the fragments in" gouaches ", paintings and sculptures that seem to bring us back, through color or shape, to a primordial analysis of matter". Dominga de la Quintana defines it as an epigone of cubism, "a reality torn in its most hidden details and recomposed according to ever-changing patterns".

The "Panorama" magazine of 1963 defines Aldo Gentilini "painter of all the anxieties of our time".

The Corona Cinematografica production company talks about it in 1975 in a video from the Luce Archive (created for the Exposition in Milan at the Science Museum):

"The Scientific Museum of Milan recently hosted an exhibition of works by Aldo Gentilini, a Genoese painter and sculptor. Gentilini's background includes both humanistic studies and a period of monastic discipline, and his work frequently addresses themes of brotherhood and freedom.

His pieces have been exhibited in galleries across Italy and internationally, including in France, Belgium, the Netherlands, the United States, and Australia. He has been the subject of numerous solo and group exhibitions over the course of his career. Critical responses to his work have varied, though many commentators have engaged seriously with its formal and thematic dimensions. His painting style ranges from vibrant and color-rich to more subdued or tragic in tone. A consistent element across his compositions is an interest in human relationships and social connection."

=== Exhibitions ===
He has exhibited in many collective and personal exhibitions in Italy, France, Belgium, Holland, Spain, Canada, America, Australia, Germany and Switzerland. In 1953 he exhibited at the Galleria S. Matteo in Genoa, in 1959 he exhibited at the Palazzetto di Venezia in Rome, in 1958 and 1967 at the S. Fedele in Milan. In 1973 he exhibited in anthology at the Cloister of the Monastery of Pietrasanta and in 1976 in Lugano.

As in the case of Guttuso and Brindisi, in 1982 he was awarded "The Golden Oak" prize in Bologna.

=== List by year ===
1953 – Exhibition in Genoa at the S. Matteo Gallery

1958 – Exhibition in Milan at S. Fedele with Fontana and with the assistance of Father Favero and Kaisserlian

1959 – Exhibition in Rome at the Palazzetto Venezia

From 1960 to 1967 various exhibitions in Courmayeur, Camogli, Varazze, Portofino, Genoa, Chamonix, Sion and other places.

1968 – Exhibition at the Galleria Europa in Milan

1969 – Exhibition at the Palette Gallery in Rome

1970 – Exhibition at the Globarte Gallery in Milan

1973 – Exhibition at the Cloister of S. Salvatore in Pietrasanta

1975 – Milan – National Museum of Science and Technology – Anthological Exhibition of Painters and Sculptors

1976 – Lugano – Switzerland – Personal

1992 – Volpeglino (AL) – Retrospective

2003/2004 – Florence – Mythologies of the present

2013 – Prato – Everything. Fragments of reality

2015 – Garbagna and Volpeglino – Anthological

== Publications ==
Modern Art – Contemporary Art – Art '900. "presents Aldo Gentilini" S.E.N. Artistic Editions – Turin

== External sources ==
Life – Enciclopedia Treccani Online – http://www.treccani.it/enciclopedia/aldo-gentilini

Life – http://www.comune.volpeglino.al.it/section.php?page=a8

Exposition 2013 – https://www.exibart.com/evento-arte/aldo-gentilini-tutto-frammenti-di-realta/

Exposition 2015 – https://novionline.ilpiccolo.net/home/2015/07/12/news/antologica-di-aldo-gentilini-aspettando-il-museo-33060/

Exposition 1975 – Archivio Luce, filmato PC047402 – https://patrimonio.archivioluce.com/luce-web/detail/IL5000081564/2/milano-madonne-aldo-gentilini-al-museo-della-scienza.html?startPage=1900

Life and techniques – http://www.miapavia.it/articolo.cfm?id=7221

Ranism – Archivio Luce – https://patrimonio.archivioluce.com/luce-web/detail/IL5000030273/2/cerca-dio-sculture-e-macchine-simboliche-aldo-gentilini-attua-mistica-dottrina-del-ranismo.html?startPage=0&jsonVal={%22jsonVal%22:{%22query%22:[%22gentilini%22],%22fieldDate%22:%22dataNormal%22,%22_perPage%22:20
