= Hidetoshi Nagasawa =

Japanese sculptor and architect

- 長澤英俊
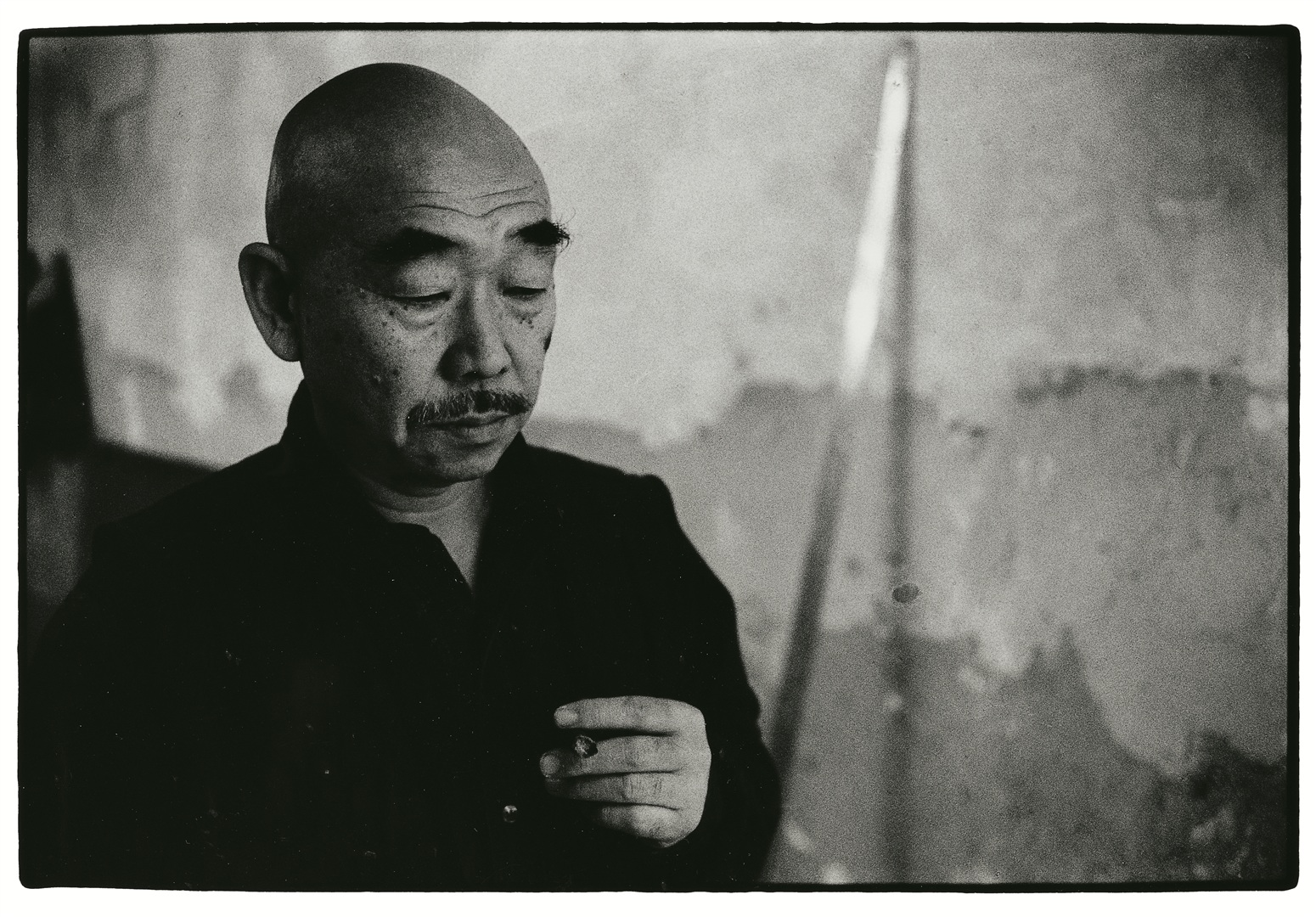
- Hidetoshi Nagasawa, 2000
- Born: 30 October 1940; Northeast area of the Republic of China
- Died: 24 March 2018 (aged 77); Milan, Lombardy, Italy
- Occupation: Architect

Hidetoshi Nagasawa (長澤 英俊, Nagasawa Hidetoshi; 30 October 1940 – 24 March 2018) was a Japanese sculptor and architect, who lived and worked in Italy from 1967 until his death in 2018.

Nagasawa was born in Tonei, Manchuria. He graduated in architecture in Tokyo in 1963. In 1966 he embarked on a long bicycle trip across Asia and Europe, eventually reaching Milan where he decided to permanently settle in 1968. In 1979 he founded the Casa degli Artisti in Milan together with Luciano Fabro and Jole De Sanna.

Nagasawa's sculptures were made of materials such as paper, wood, stone and metal, and incorporated Eastern and Western cultural and religious elements. In the 1980s, he started creating his first environments, exploring the relationship between sculpture and architecture.

Nagasawa was a lecturer at the Nuova Accademia di Belle Arti in Milan. He participated to the Venice Biennale in 1972, 1976, 1982 and 1988. He was invited to Documenta 9 in Kassel in 1992 and in 2006 he participated in the XII Biennale of Sculpture in Carrara. He has also held solo shows at the Padiglione d'Arte Contemporanea in Milan (1988), the Galleria Comunale in Bologna (1993), and the Fundació Pilar i Joan Miró in Mallorca (1996).
