= Bernhard Cella =

Austrian artist and curator

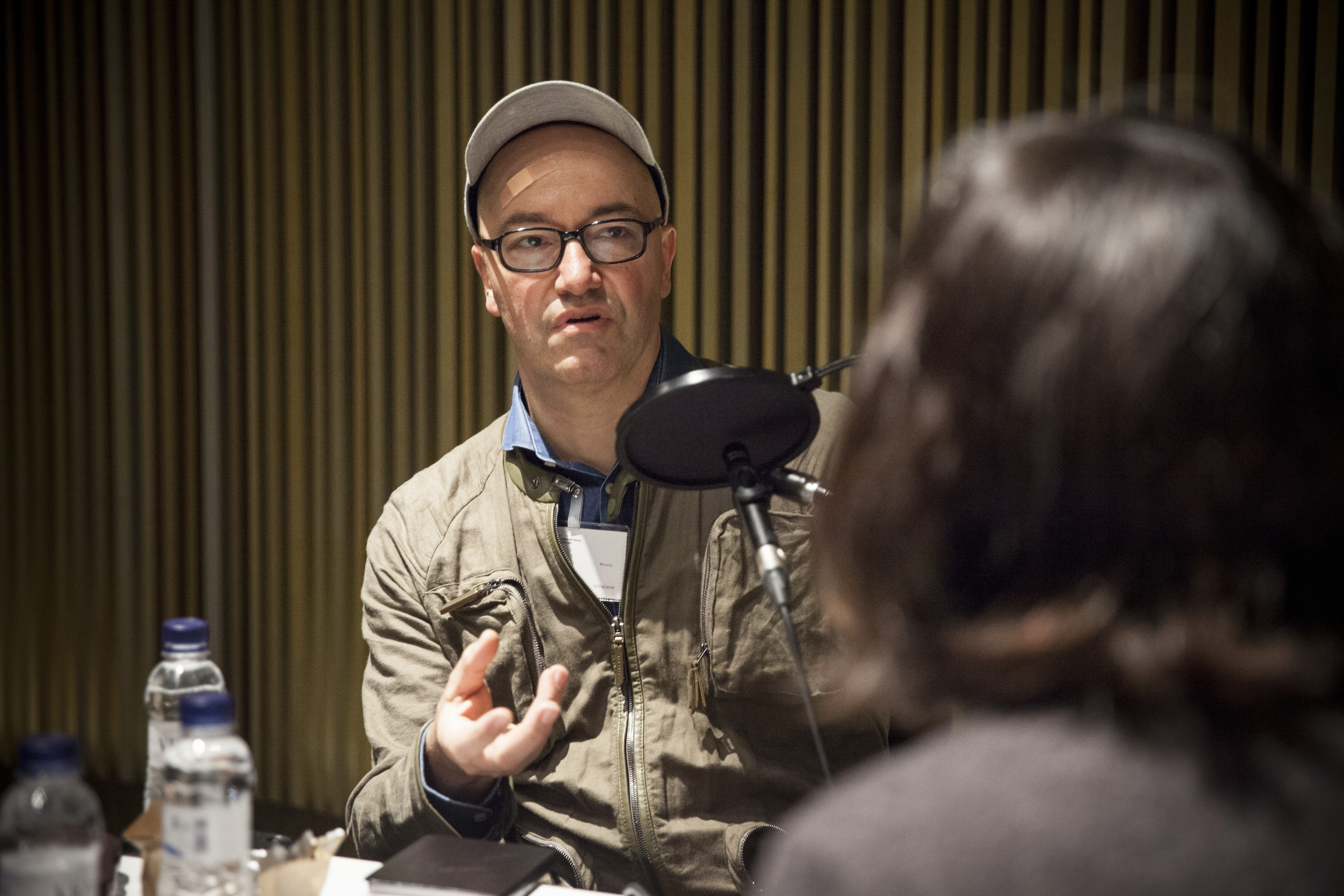
- Born: 1969 (age 56–57); Salzburg, Austria
- Education: Academy of Fine Arts Vienna, University of Arts and Industrial Design Linz Hochschule für bildende Künste Hamburg
- Known for: Sculpture, conceptual art, book art
- Notable work: Salon für Kunstbuch
- Movement: Contemporary art
- Awards: Stipendium Rome (2004), Stipendium Paris (2003), 24. Austrian Graphic award (1995)

Bernhard Cella (born 1969 in Salzburg) is an Austrian artist and curator.

== Academic career ==
Cella studied at the Academy of Fine Arts Vienna with Erich Wonder, the University of Arts and Industrial Design Linz with Herbert Lachmayer and the Hochschule für bildende Künste Hamburg. Cella was a researcher in the Center of Art and Knowledge Transfer at the University of Applied Arts Vienna and led the project 'NO ISBN' which investigated Austrian art publications with and without ISBN. In 2015 he left the university to continue his research with the project 'Behind No-ISBN' at the independent Research Institute for Arts and Technology.

== Work ==
Cella is an advocate of artist books as a medium and has curated numerous exhibitions with and about artist books. He has stated that a good art book can replace a visit to a museum, because it offers many possibilities for discourse and experimentation.

With projects like Collecting Books, Salon für Kunstbuch or Kunstbuch*Kompass, he changes the perception of the viewer towards the books that are included in the project. He often uses unusual re-arrangements to disorient the viewers in their viewing habits. His works shift modes of production and distribution of current forms of visual art; in this way he operated as a businessman-artist, who transcends the barriers between business and art. He has made artworks that operate also as a fashion studio, a hotel and a museum shop.

I don't perceive any conflict between art and economy because both systems have very strong connections. It seems to be impossible to analyze both domains separately artists have always operated in both systems, which have different rules, but always are intertwined. Bernhard Cella

In his project "and. learning English has no use" he used reproductions of his artworks to overcome language barriers that he encountered during a stay in Nanjing, where he used the aesthetics to create modes of communication to make it possible for him and the Chinese students to work together. The students reproduced his artworks, and by this a direct form of communication was developed between them. In 2012, he was invited by artist AA Bronson and Printed Matter Inc. for the New York Art Book Fair, where he showed Austrian art books and publications in the MoMa/PS1. His lectures were held in institutions like the University of Arts and Industrial Design Linz, the print room in Amsterdam, the Galerie für Zeitgenössische Kunst Leipzig, and the Ö1 of the Castle Sigharting. He collaborates with many curators and artists, including Diana Baldon and Franz West.

== Curator ==
His curatorial practice is focused mainly on exhibiting books. He has curated the following exhibitions about artbooks: "Revolver - Archiv für aktuelle Kunst Frankfurt", "7 Schweiz - 195 Künstlerbücher","14 x NL in 1070", 35 books from London, COLLECTING BOOKS - FOCUS ON AUSTRIA, "Künstlerbücher aus der Türkei" and "MIT Care-Paket. 30 kg Kunsttheorie aus Amerika".

== Salon für Kunstbuch ==
Cella places himself as an artist on an economic terrain; he stages service and entrepreneurship as basics of his own artistic practice. Bettina Steinbrügge

In 2007 Cella founded the Salon für Kunstbuch (Salon for Artbooks), a work of art that appears to be a bookstore, but is actually a 1:1 scale model of a bookstore. It is dedicated to showing the work of international practitioners from the sphere of artist's books. Books are exhibited and only sometimes sold there, as some of the books are only part of the current exhibition. The project shifts the viewing habits of the visitors, by using performative and sculptural actions. The printed matter is presented using a cumulative method that uses formats like rotating exhibitions, performative readings and lectures that are organized together with other artists, curators and philosophers. The Salon für Kunstbuch has hosted talks by Sabeth Buchmann, Elisabeth Samsonov, Bureau for Open Culture and the Grazer Autorenversammlung. In 2011 the Austrian Gallery Belvedere, a public institution, bought the work for the newly opened venue 21er Haus. Since then the Salon für Kunstbuch operates as the museum's shop and as a steadily changing sculptural and performative intervention in the foyer of the 21er Haus. With the "Salon für Kunstbuch im 21er Haus" questions about the status of museum shops since the '80s and the representation of the museum through the range of a shop are stated.

Currently he is the first and only artist in Austria who can teach commercial apprentices in the bookstore sector.

== Collections ==
His works are in the collections of museums and private collections like the Belvedere, the art collection of Salzburg, the art collection of lower Austria, the collection of Nikos Alexiou, the collection of the Centre Georges Pompidou, the Albertina, the Museum für angewandte Kunst Wien, the Van Abbemuseum, the museum in progress, and the J. Paul Getty Museum.

== Selected exhibitions ==
- 2012 ZEIT (LOSE) ZEICHEN. Gegenwartskunst in Referenz zu Otto Neurath, Künstlerhaus (Gruppenausstellung)
- 2012 Utopie Gesamtkunstwerk, 21er Haus (Gruppenausstellung)
- 2011 Eröffnung des 21er Haus / Schöne Aussichten!, 21er Haus, Vienna Art Week 11. Reflecting Reality (Gruppenausstellung)
- 2007 Art Basel / Used Future & Nieves
- 2006 Bernhard Cella. Die Kunst des Verweilens, Salzburger Kunstverein
- 2006 Nairobi Retour, Kunsthalle Wien, project space
- 2004 Skulpturenpreis des Landes Salzburg, Galerie im Traklhaus
- 2000 Bernhard Cella. Videos, Kunstverein Baden, Video
- 1997 from ten for one to ART, Museum für angewandte Kunst, Video, Videoinstallation
- 1995 Bernhard Cella. Jahrestafel Kunst Österreich, Kulturzentrum Oberwart, Bregenzer Kunstverein [old], Depot, Kunst und Diskussion, Galerie bois, Kunsthalle Krems, Tiroler Landesmuseum Ferdinandeum, Kärntner Landesgalerie, Neue Galerie der Stadt Linz, Neue Galerie Graz, Galerie 5020
- 1993 Jahresausstellung 93, Salzburger Kunstverein

== Literature ==
=== Primary material ===
- 2013. "Schrift: Maria Knoll"
- 2012. "And, learning English has no use" / Edition Fotohof, 2012 / ISBN 978-3-902675-67-5
- 2012. "The Artist's View"
- 2011. "Präsentation: Bernhard Cella. Salon für Kunstbuch", 2011
- 2010. "Ökonomie der Unaufmerksamkeit"
- 2009. "Aus der Wand treten"
- 2008. "Artist at work"/ Schlebrügge Editor, 2008
- 2007. "Neo-Kuratin: Kuratorenpflaster", Edition Hotel Ostblick 2007
- 2007. "Travel Issue, Vienna [23.-29.05.2007]"/ Used Future, 2007 (with Tobias Madison)
- 2006. "Die Kunst des Verweilens"/ Edition Ostblick, 2006. (with Andreas Leo Findeisen and Hemma Schmutz
- 2006. "Incubation douce"/ Edition Ostblick, 2006
- 2006. "Travel Journal two"/ Edition Ostblick, 2006. (with Jonathan Harker)
- 2005. "Model for a Book"
- 2004. "Weihnachtsbäume 1"/ Edition Ostblick, 2004.
- 2004. "Weihnachtsbäume 2"/ Edition Ostblick, 2004.
- 2004. "Weihnachtsbäume 3"/ Edition Ostblick, 2004.
- 2003. "Porno mit Luppe". Wollüstige Spiele", 2003, 18 x 12 cm
- 2003. "Stiching Marathon", 2003, Museum für Volkskunde.
- 2002. "Travel Journal"/ Edition Ostblick, 2002.
- 2000. "Jahrbuch Kunst Österreich. 52 Einsichten in das österreichische Kunstgeschehen"/ Edition Ostblick. (with Anselm Wagner and Burghart Schmidt)
- 2000. "Annual Table on Art in Austria: Ornamental Schematics to the Rhythms of Austrian Seasons"/ Edition Ostblick, 2000.
- 2000. "Cadeaugeschenkgift," / Edition Selene, 2000. (with Hans Ch Dany and Georg Schöllhammer)
- 1999. "Defile"/ Edition Ostblick, 1999. (with Joke Roobard)
- 1993. "Salzburg. Baden Baden. St.Moritz"/ Edition Ostblick, 1993 (with Christiane Klappert).
- 1993. "Kunstpassage", Edition Hotel Ostblick" (with Christiane Klappert)
- 1995. "Jahrbuch Kunst Österreich. Der Kalender für ein Jahr, 52 Einsichten in das österreichische Kunstgeschehen"/ Verein für Interkulturellen Datentransfer, 1995
- 1990 "1m2 Kunst" [die Kunst im Rasterraum; ein 14-Tage-Spiel]/ Dialog Blau Verein zur Förderung von Kommunikationsforschung, 1990

=== Secondary material ===
- Hofleitner, Johanna. 2010. "Rundgang: Wiener Künstler an ihren Lieblingsplätzen "/ Die Presse, 2010.
- 2009. "A work of art as industrious as a business " In Lookbook Departure, 2009, page 307.
- Benzer, Christa. 2006. " Im Licht der gleißenden Sonne: Rundgang durch Salzburgs Kunstlandschaft" / Standard
- Zendron, Rainer. 1992. Kraft des Materials In ' Kraft des Materials [vorläufige Ergebnisse eines Prozesses]| O.K Centrum für Gegenwartskunst.
- David Galloway.2008. "Art Cologne's emerging new identity" / The New York Times, 2008.
- Lisa Rosenblatt. 2007 / "Why even try?" in Art in Migration, 2007
- Senf TV. 2012 / TV, 14.02.12
- Christian Kravagna. 1995, "What am I doing here?" in Kunstforum, 1995
- Michael LingnerZu Bernhard Cella/Mario Ohno in Kunstforum international, Nr. 125, (Jan/Feb 1994
