= Wolfgang Laib =

German artist

- Born: 25 March 1950 (age 76); Metzingen, Germany
- Education: Full degree in Medicine, University Tuebingen, Germany
- Known for: Sculpture
- Spouse: Carolyn Reep (1985–present)
- Awards: Praemium Imperiale for Sculpture, Tokyo, 2015

Wolfgang Laib (born 25 March 1950 in Metzingen, Germany) is a German artist, predominantly known as a sculptor. He lives and works in a small village in southern Germany, maintaining studios in New York and South India.

His work has been exhibited worldwide in many of the most important galleries and museums. He represented Germany in the 1982, Venice Biennale and was included with his works in the Documenta 7 in 1982, and the Documenta 8 in 1987. In 2015, he received the Praemium Imperiale for sculpture in Tokyo, Japan.

He became world-renowned for his "Milkstones", a pure geometry of white marble made completely with milk, as well as his vibrant installations of pollen. In 2013 The Museum of Modern Art in New York City presented his largest pollen piece – 7 m × 8 m – in the central atrium of the museum.

== Life and work ==
Wolfgang Laib was born 25 March 1950 in Metzingen, Germany, the son of medical doctor Gustav Laib and his wife Lydia. In 1962, the family moved to a small village near Biberach an der Riss. There, Laib's father built a contemporary glass house of unique architectural style amongst meadows and forests. The life which developed there had a remarkable impact on all members of the family.

Jakob Braeckle, a landscape painter of the region, became a close friend of the Laibs. Through him, the Laibs became acquainted with the paintings of Kazimir Malevich stored in Biberach by architect Hugo Haering and later acquired by the Stedelijk Museum in Amsterdam. Through this friendship, young Laib became acquainted with Eastern culture and philosophy and developed a strong interest in Taoism and Zen Buddhism.

The family later traveled throughout Europe, visiting places where art and treasures of medieval culture were preserved. The life and teachings of Saint Francis of Assisi deeply influenced Laib, who later journeyed to India and various other Asian countries.

In spite of his growing passion for art, Laib began to study medicine at the University of Tuebingen in 1968. As his studies progressed, he began to question the meaning of the medicine of the century. Disillusioned with Western medicine, he came to view the natural sciences, as well as most other modern thinking, as limited by their dependency on logic and the material world. Laib began to be interested in Eastern spiritualism, philosophy and pre-Renaissance thought, studying Sanskrit and Eastern philosophy. In 1972, still in the middle of his medical studies, he began to work on a stone sculpture called "Brahmanda", meaning "cosmic egg" in Sanskrit. Laib decided to finish his medical studies, but with the full intent of embarking on the career of an artist.

He returned to his home village near Biberach, and the intensity of his medical experience combined with all else led to the creation of his first "milkstones". Consisting of a rectangular piece of polished, pure white marble, the top center of the surface is sanded down to create a subtle depression which Laib fills with milk, thus allowing the unity of the ephemeral milk with the solid density of the white marble.

In 1977, Laib began to collect pollen in the meadows and forests around the vicinity of his village; he has continued to collect pollen every spring to summer since then, with the process becoming an important part of his daily life. The pollen is presented in exhibitions in a variety of ways, best known as a radiant field sifted on the floor in a softened rectangular form. In other special situations, the pollen is presented in simple glass jars or small piles.

In 1976, he had his first exhibition at gallery Mueller–Roth in Stuttgart showing the early Milkstones. This was the beginning of many exhibitions around the world over many decades. In 1979 and 1981, he had his first exhibitions in New York. He lived and worked in Tribeca, a time during which he met Carolyn Reep, a conservator specializing in Asian art and antiquities, who would then after become his wife. In 1982, he took part in the Documenta 7 and represented Germany in the Venice Biennale together with Hanne Darboven and Gotthard Graubner.

In 1985, Carolyn moved to Germany, where she accompanied Wolfgang Laib as his spouse over the following decades. Their relationship involved a shared engagement with their personal and professional lives, as well as common values. In 1986, their daughter, Chandra Maria, was born.

Where Have You Gone - Where Are You Going? (2013), an example of Laib's wax rooms, in 2022, installed permanently at The Phillips Collection

Since 1983 his involvement with materials progressed into rice, beeswax, sealing wax, Burmese lacquer and some metals. At first he made smaller beeswax pieces which then developed into major large-scale pieces like beeswax chambers and stepped pyramids called "Zikkurats".

Laib has always been less concerned with innovation or formal development than with the notion of continuity. His oeuvre is not to be approached in a chronological order, but in a cyclical manner, as he uses the same forms and materials regularly. Laib considers himself a vehicle for ideas of universality and timelessness that are already present in nature. In his work, the micro often connects to the macro in a way that reconfigures our place in the universe. He stated: “I did with my art works what I wanted to do as a doctor. I never changed my profession.” In 2000, he created the first permanent wax chamber in Roc del Maure in the Pyrenees mountains near Perpignan. Other wax chambers followed near his studio in southern Germany, in the lower Engadin in Switzerland, in the Phillips Collection in Washington, D.C., and a 50-meter-long corridor for Anselm Kiefer in Barjac, southern France, realized in 2014.

In 2006, he established a studio in a small village in the hills near Madurai in South India. He spends at least two months there yearly, and it was while there that he created a body of new works with black granite, white ashes, and other materials. He made a proposal for a huge Brahmanda – 20 m long – on Pulimalai, a bare granite hill – in nearby Madurai.

In 2010, Carolyn and Wolfgang purchased a small live/work space in Manhattan.

== Exhibitions and installations ==
- 1976 : first exhibition at gallery Mueller-Roth, Stuttgart
- 1982 : Wolfgang Laib represents (Germany) in the Venice Biennale together with Hanne Darboven and Gotthard Graubner
- 1982 and 1987 : Laib participates in Documenta 7 and 8
- 1985 : Harald Szeemann invites Laib to participate in an exhibition "Spuren, Skulpturen und Monumente ihrer praezisen Reise" in Kunsthaus Zurich where he shows the pollen mountains "“The Five Mountains not to Climb on". Both feel that this work unites their visions and dreams about art and their life. This becomes the beginning of a long and intense relationship with many exhibitions worldwide.
- 2000 : Laib realizes his first permanent wax chamber in the mountains of the southern Pyrenees, Roc del Maure, near Perpignan, France
- 2000 – 2002 : a major retrospective, curated by Klaus Ottmann, is shown in five important American museums, first at the Hirshhorn Museum and Sculpture Garden, Washington D.C. and will be shown last at the Haus der Kunst in Munich
- 2002 – 2003 : major exhibitions in museums in Japan and Korea, among them The National Museum of Modern Art, Tokyo, the Municipal Museum of Art, Toyota City and The National Museum of Contemporary Art, Seoul
- 2004 : He realizes a major wax chamber near his studio in southern Germany
- 2005 : the Fondation Beyeler in Basel dedicates a major exhibition to him
- 2010 : Laib makes a proposal for a huge Brahmanda – 20 m long – on Pulimalai, a bare granite hill near Madurai, South India
- 2013 : The Museum of Modern Art in New York exhibits a huge pollen piece – 7 m x 8 m – in the main atrium of the museum. At the same time he realizes a permanent wax chamber in the Phillips Collection in Washington D.C.
- 2014 : Anselm Kiefer invites him to create a huge wax corridor – 50 m long – in Barjac, Southern France. Laib exhibits his big beeswax steppyramid "Zikkurat" in the Basilica Sant’Apollinare in Classe, Ravenna, Italy

Over many years the following galleries showed his work up to the present:

- Gallery Konrad Fischer, Duesseldorf, Germany
- Gallery Sperone Westwater, New York
- Gallery Buchmann, Berlin, Lugano
- Gallery Thaddaeus Ropac, Salzburg, Paris
- Gallery Kenji Taki, Tokyo, Nagoya
- Gallery Alfonso Artiaco, Naples

== Monographs and catalogues ==
- Museum MASI Lugano: Franciolli, Marco and Menegoi, Simone. Wolfgang Laib. Lugano, MASI and Edizioni Casagrande, 2017. Contains a detailed chronology of the artist
- Ravenna: Wolfgang Laib at Sant’Apollinare in Classe. With texts selected by Wolfgang Laib and an interview with the artist by Maria Rita Bentini. Gian Enzo Sperone, Turin 2016
- Fondazione Merz: Wolfgang Laib.Mahayagna – vedic fire ritual – with Brahmins from South India. Texts by Beatrice Merz and Maria Centonze, Federico Squarcini, interview with the artist by Klaus Ottmann, Turin 2009
- Museum Grenoble: Wolfgang Laib. Without place – without time – without body. Text by Guy Tosatto, selected texts by Wolfgang Laib. Musée de Grenoble and Actes Sud 2008
- Museum Reina Sofia Madrid: Wolfgang Laib. Sin Principio Sin Fin. Texts by Antonio Gamoneda, José Maria-Medina and Carlos Ortega. Museo Nacional Centro de Arte Reina Sofia. Madrid 2007
- Fondation Beyeler, Basel: Wolfgang Laib. Das Vergängliche ist das Ewige. Texts by Katharina Schmidt, Philipp Büttner, Ulf Küster, Christoph Vitali, Harald Szeemann and Wolfgang Laib. With a short chronology of the artist. Fondation Beyeler and Hatje Cantz, Basel, 2005
- Museum Macro, Rome: Wolfgang Laib. Text by Danilo Eccher. Museo Macro Roma and Electa Editore, Milano, 2005. With a chronology of the artist and a bibliography
- Kunstmuseum Bonn and De Pont Museum, Tilburg: The Essence of the Real. Wolfgang Laib. Drawings and Photographs. Texts by Christoph Schreier and Klaus Ottmann. Kunstmuseum Bonn and De Pont Museum Tilburg, 2005
- Toyota Municipal Museum of Art: Wolfgang Laib.Text by Tadashi Kanai. Toyota City, 2003
- National Museum of Contemporary Art, Seoul: Wolfgang Laib. Text by Seungwan Kang and Others, Seoul, 2003
- The National Museum of Modern Art, Tokyo: Wolfgang Laib. Text by Tohru Matsumoto, Tokyo, 2003
- Retrospective USA and German version Haus der Kunst: Wolfgang Laib. A Retrospective. Texts by Klaus Ottmann, Margit Rowell, Conversation with the artist by Harald Szeemann. With a chronology and a bibliography. English version: AFA and Hatje Cantz, 2000 German version: Haus der Kunst and Hatje Cantz, 2002
- Kunsthaus Bregenz: Wolfgang Laib. Text by Elisabeth Samsonow. Interview with the artist by Rudolf Sagmeister. Bregenz 1999
- Museum Carré d’Art, Nîmes: Wolfgang Laib. Somewhere Else. Text by Guy Tosatto. Nîmes 1999
- Kunstmuseum Bonn and The Museum of Contemporary Art Los Angeles: Wolfgang Laib. Texts by Klaus Schrenk, Kerry Brougher and Donald Kuspit Bonn, Los Angeles, 1992
- Museum Ascona: Wolfgang Laib.Text by Harald Szeemann. Ascona, 1992
- Museum Capc Bordeaux: Wolfgang Laib. Text by Jean-Marc Avrilla. Bordeaux 1992
- Kunstverein Stuttgart: Wolfgang Laib. Texts by Tilman Osterwold, Johannes Cladders, Hans-Joachim Müller, Harald Szeemann, Stuttgart 1989
- ARC – Musée d’Art Moderne de la Ville de Paris: Wolfgang Laib. Text by Harald Szeemann, Interview with the artist by Suzanne Pagé, Paris, 1986
- Venice Biennale, German Pavillon: Wolfgang Laib. Text by Johannes Cladders. Venice 1982 and Museum Abteiberg, Mönchengladbach, 1983
- Kunstraum München: Wolfgang Laib.Text by Hermann Kern. München 1978

== Awards ==
- 1987 : Arnold Bode Preis
- 2015 : Praemium Imperiale for Sculpture in Tokyo

== Collection ==
- Museum of Modern Art, New York
- The Hirshhorn Museum and Sculpture Garden, Washington D.C.
- The Phillips Collection, Washington D.C.
- The Art Institute Chicago
- The Museum of Modern Art, San Francisco
- Centre Pompidou, Paris
- Musée de Grenoble
- Carré d’Art Nîmes
- Musée de Rochechouart
- Kunsthaus Zurich
- Museum St Gallen
- LAC Lugano
- The National Museum of Modern Art, Tokyo
- Toyota Municipal Museum of Art, Toyota City, Japan
- The National Museum of Contemporary Art, Seoul
- Leum, Seoul
- The National Gallery of Australia, Canberra
- The Museum of New South Wales, Sydney
- The Museum of Modern and Contemporary Art, Helsinki
- De Pont Museum, Tilburg, Netherlands
- Pinakothek der Moderne, Munich
- Kunstmuseum Stuttgart
- Kunstmuseum Bonn
- Kunsthalle Karlsruhe
- Sprengel Museum, Hannover
