= Martin Disler =

Swiss painter (1949–1996)

- Born: 1 March 1949; Seewen, Solothurn, Switzerland
- Died: 27 August 1996 (aged 47); Geneva, Switzerland
- Known for: Painting, drawing, sculpture, printmaking, writing
- Movement: Neue Wilde, Neo-expressionism
- Spouse(s): Agnes Barmettler; Irene Grundel

Martin Disler (1 March 1949 – 27 August 1996) was a Swiss painter, draughtsman and writer. He is regarded as a leading representative of the Neue Wilde movement, and his work has been associated with neo-expressionism. He gained international recognition in the early 1980s for large-scale expressive paintings and installations, and participated in Documenta 7 in 1982.

== Biography ==
Martin Disler was born on 1 March 1949 in Seewen, where his parents ran a plant nursery. He attended a boarding school in Stans from 1962 to 1968, when he was expelled for disciplinary reasons. He subsequently worked for six months as a nursing assistant at the Rosegg psychiatric clinic in Solothurn, and began painting during this period.

A self-taught artist, Disler established his first studio in Solothurn in 1969. After living briefly in Olten, he was based in Dulliken for much of the 1970s and also spent time in Paris, Italy and the United States. He was married first to the artist Agnes Barmettler and later to the artist Irene Grundel.

Disler relocated to Zurich in 1978 after destroying a large portion of his earlier work. From 1978 to 1981, he had a studio at the Rote Fabrik in Zurich and collaborated with the artist Klaudia Schifferle. Between 1981 and 1988, he worked in Zurich, New York, the Netherlands, Paris, Milan and Samedan.

His awards included the Bremer Kunstpreis in 1985, the Preis für junge Schweizer Kunst of the Zürcher Kunstgesellschaft in 1987 and the Kunstpreis des Kantons Solothurn in 1988. After the mid-1980s, critics found it increasingly difficult to place Disler’s work within an established artistic context as it developed beyond its earlier association with Wilde Malerei. From 1988, he lived at various times in Les Planchettes, Lugano, Vienna and the Netherlands. Disler died of a stroke on 27 August 1996 in Geneva, aged 47.

== Work ==
Disler is regarded as a leading representative of the Neue Wilde. His work has also been associated with neo-expressionism. He was a painter, draughtsman and writer who also worked in sculpture, object art and printmaking.

Drawing occupied a central place in Disler’s work during the 1970s. From 1978, printmaking and large-format expressive painting became major components of his work.

By the early 1980s, he was producing large-scale painting actions and installations, including Invasion durch eine falsche Sprache (1980), Die Umgebung der Liebe (1981) and Öffnung eines Massengrabes (1982). These works contributed to his international reputation within a broader neo-expressionist movement that included Sandro Chia, Francesco Clemente and Georg Baselitz.

The human body remained central to Disler’s imagery as his works moved between recognizable forms and abstraction. In a group of watercolours from 1982, gestural marks form distorted faces that emerge from dark surroundings. These watercolours address themes of love, death, gender relations and violence. Across his work, Disler explored fear, power, devotion and hope.

Disler’s work was characterized by an intensely physical creative process. In his paintings, Disler worked with brushes and his hands, sometimes scraping paint from the surface with a knife in a process comparable to making sculpture. His paintings were rapidly executed in large formats, with densely worked surfaces and powerful gestures.

Sculpture, previously secondary to his painting, drawing and printmaking, became increasingly important from 1985. In his later work, painting and sculpture became more closely connected. Writing also played an important role in Disler’s work. He contributed texts to more than a dozen artists’ books, and his published works included the 1980 novel Bilder vom Maler.

== Exhibitions ==
Disler’s first solo exhibition was presented at the Kunstzone in Munich and the Galerie Delphin in Olten in 1971. His 1980 solo exhibition Invasion durch eine falsche Sprache (Invasion by a False Language) at the Kunsthalle Basel brought him wider international attention. He participated in Documenta 7 in Kassel in 1982 and had solo exhibitions at the Stedelijk Museum in Amsterdam and the Museum für Gegenwartskunst in Basel in 1983.

In 2006, the Aargauer Kunsthaus organized a retrospective of Disler’s work, ten years after his death. In 2017, the Musée d’Art et d’Histoire in Geneva presented Direkt ins Herz, an exhibition of his prints, drawings, manuscripts and printing matrices. In 2019, the Bündner Kunstmuseum in Chur exhibited the 140-metre painting Die Umgebung der Liebe, its first public presentation since 1987. From 2020 to 2021, the Kirchner Museum Davos presented Theater des Überlebens. Martin Disler – die späten Jahre, focusing on the last ten years of his life. The exhibition included sculptures, paintings and prints, as well as previously unknown works from his estate.

== Collections ==
Disler’s work is held by institutions including the Kunsthalle Basel, the Kupferstichkabinett of the Kunstmuseum Basel, the Museum of Fine Arts Bern, the Cabinet des estampes and cantonal art collection in Geneva, the Musée d'Art et d'Histoire (Neuchâtel), the Kunsthaus Zürich and the Graphische Sammlung of ETH Zurich.
