= Velonis =

Velonis is a surname. Notable people with the surname include:

- Anthony Velonis (1911–1997), American painter
- Kostis Velonis (born 1968), Greek sculptor
