= Burghart Schmidt =

German philosopher (1942–2022)

Burghart Schmidt (30 November 1942 – 13 February 2022) was a German philosopher. He was professor at Hochschule für Gestaltung Offenbach and the University of Applied Arts Vienna.

== Education ==
He was born in Wildeshausen, Oldenburg, Germany. Schmidt was educated in biology, chemistry, physics and then philosophy and history of art at the University of Tübingen. He was coworker for many years of Ernst Bloch, over whom he submitted later also numerous publications, among them the standard work Ernst Bloch (1985). From 1968 to 1977 he worked as a scientific coworker of the philosopher and published his complete work at Suhrkamp. After the graduation in 1982 at the University of Tübingen as a Dr. phil. he wrote his habilitation in 1984 at Leibniz University Hannover.

== Career ==
Schmidt taught from 1971 to 1975 at the University of Wuppertal, from 1975 to 1997 at Leibniz University Hannover, whose architecture faculty appointed him after the habilitation 1985 as a fee professor. From 1977 on he teaches also at the University of Applied Arts Vienna and from 1983 to 1997 he was also at the academy of Vienna. Since 1997 he is a professor for language and aesthetics at the Hochschule für Gestaltung Offenbach. As guest lecturer and/or a guest professor he worked 1984 to 1997 at the University of Klagenfurt, 1991/1992 at the Graz University of Technology, as well as at the International Centre for Culture and Management (ICCM) in Salzburg. Professor Dr. phil. habil. Burghart Schmidt lived in Offenbach am Main (near Frankfurt) and Vienna since 1997. He died on February 13, 2022, at the age of 79 in Vienna, Austria.

== Selected works ==
- Der Widerstand des Realen in der Arbeitstruktur des Erkennens zum Methodenproblem des praxisorientierten Wissens, Dissertation, Tübingen 1982
- Seminar zur Philosophie Ernst Blochs, Frankfurt 1983
- Benjamin zur Einführung, Hannover 1983
- Kritik der reinen Utopie — eine sozialphilosophische Untersuchung im Feld der Wirksamkeit antizipatorischen Bewusstseins (Habilitation) Hannover 1984
- “German Irrationalism during Weimar”. Telos 65 (Fall 1985). New York: Telos Press.
- Das Widerstandsargument in der Erkenntnistheorie. Ein Angriff auf die Automatisierung des Wissens, Frankfurt 1985
- Ernst Bloch, Stuttgart 1985
- Postmoderne — Strategien des Vergessens. Ein kritischer Bericht, Darmstadt and Neuwied 1986
- Kritik der reinen Utopie. Eine sozialphilosophische Untersuchung, Stuttgart 1988
- Kritische Theorie des Ornaments (A Critical theory on Ornament) Vienna Cologne and Weimar 1993 (edited with Gérard Raulet)
- Jahrbuch Kunst Österreich/ Edition Ostblick, Vienna 2000 (with Bernhard Cella and Anselm Wagner)
- Vom Parergon zum Labyrinth. Untersuchungen zur kritischen Theorie des Ornaments, Vienna Cologne and Weimar 2001 (edited with Gérard Raulet)
