= Nikos Alexiou =

Greek artist

- Born: 1960; Rethymno, Crete, Greece
- Died: 2011
- Education: 1982 Academy of Fine Arts Vienna; 1984 Athens School of Fine Arts
- Known for: Visual art, contemporary art, installation art, set design
- Notable work: The End, The Gate, Prisms, Solar Houses, San Marco di Venezia, Angel rolling up the heavens

Nikos Alexiou (Greek: Νίκος Αλεξίου; 1960–2011) was a Greek artist who specialized in visual art, contemporary art, installation art and set design for theatre and dance. He exhibited his work at personal exhibitions and group events both in Greece and abroad.

== Education ==
In 1982, at the age of 22, Alexiou moved to Austria to study at the Viennese Academy of Fine Arts. Two years later, he returned to Greece to study at the Athens School of Fine Arts.

== Career ==
Alexiou received recognition for his work as set designer for Medea (Dimitris Papaioannou, (1993) and for The End (installation, 2007). The End was selected as the Greek contribution to the 52nd Venice Biennale.

=== Events ===
- 23rd Biennale of Alexandria, 2005.
- Outlook and the Athens by Art exhibitions, 2004 Athens Olympic Games and 2004 Cultural Olympiad
- Breakthrough! Greece 2004, Madrid
- Free Transit, Spain, 2003, Zappeion, Greek Presidency of the EU.
- Deste Prize, 2003 (Deste foundation, Greece)

== Contemporary and visual art ==
In 1985, Alexiou held his first personal exhibition at "Desmos" Gallery in Athens. He used basic materials and those commonly found in nature such as rock, wood, mud and water. In 1987, Alexiou continued his experimentation with natural features by venturing into their decomposition. He created Prisms, a series of works which analyzes the projection of white light into different spaces, even through rain. Alexiou later created Solar Houses, minimalistic constructions of cane and reeds which share a fragile feeling of absolute geometry. Alexiou said, he was creating "an imaginable garden pavilion". Other works in this genre include: San Marco di Venezia, The Gate, and Fountain.

=== The End ===
In 2007, Vassilika Sarilaki, an art historian, interviewed Alexiou regarding his participation in the Venice Biennale. She wrote,

"A master of space and the sense of the borderline, Nikos Alexiou, an artist known for his delicate works and motifs, his paper embroidered with perforations and his frugal constructions, will be representing Greece at this year’s Venice biennale."
"The title of this year’s biennale, (2007) which will be held between June 10 and mid November, is "Think with the senses -- feel with the mind. Art in the present tense", and, Nikos Alexiou’s sensuous installation seems to get to the very heart of the matter. Starting out with the wonderful motifs in the floor mosaics of the Oberon monastery, which he reproduces in endlessly varying colours and designs to articulate an ecstatic world of beauty and moderation. His is a 'structured chaos' which balances the geometric nature of the material with the spontaneity of gesture."
"Alexiou’s work emerges once more not as a product of a prefabricated idea, but as the source of an all-embracing gift to the beauty of forms. As a product and an engagement of his bodily devotion to it. And it is this which ultimately bestows a natural grace and an aura of redemption on the work."
"Alexiou means tradition in the sense ascribed to it by Husserl. That "painting’s past creates a tradition in the artist, a duty to start over differently; not survival, which is the hypocritical form of forgetfulness, but effectual reclamation, which is a noble form of memory". It is this "reclamation of memory" through the experience of familiarity that he attempts to convey today, though he allows the viewer to see the work unfettered and to lose themselves in the ecstasy of the small, psychedelic world it proposes; a world dotted with coloured motifs which flow in space, with tender sketches of the monastery and intricate digital labyrinths on video."
"Taken together, the recollective designs, the fragmentary motifs moving imperceptibly on video, constantly changing shape, and the intricate patterns suspended in mid air define a new aesthetic world open to the imagination, to experience, to the viewer’s "individual breath", and in so doing render largely relative the classical view of stability and the objectivity of space. Meaning the guise of material crops up again and again as a concept in Alexiou’s work as a pretext for taking a fresh look at our inner world and the way it is naturally reflected on the outside. And this might ultimately be art’s prime subject."

- "What will the installation you will be showing at the Venice biennale include exactly, and how will it be structured?"

"The work functions as a theatrical machine. Because the way it is set up 'plays' with the viewer. Inside its gate, there is a large screen with a video projected on it which invites the viewer to proceed further in, essentially to wander around on 'stage', into the heart of the machine. Meaning the viewer doesn’t watch from outside; he enters something that surrounds him on all sides. Behind the screen, there is a series of intricate hanging 'embroideries' which mirror the banners with different designs from the Iveron monastery."

- "What was it that moved you about this particular floor from the Iveron monastery? Were you just interested in its form, or were your personal experiences your starting point, given that you’ve been visiting the monastery since 1995?"

"These things are strange, as you know. You come into contact with something and you don’t know what it is that moves you... It could have been something else. But this floor was in the very centre of the church, and living in the monastery you would cross it several times a day. So the reasons I chose it were related to my experiences of it, and with my familiarity with it."

- "But as I can see from the video, in a sense these designs function as a pretext for a 'meditative loss'"...

"Yes, they do. Meaning that what I do is lay all these lines out in a place in a 'give 'em all you’ve got' sort of way. But see how nice it is... enjoy it. It’s a trip; isn’t that what they say."

- "It really is delightful. It reminds me of Arabic motifs..."

"You’re pretty far off the mark there. These are Greek motifs; we’ve had them since 300 BC. They’re designs you grow up with."

- "Why did you entitle the work "The end"?"

"I was referencing a wonderful text by Beckett with that title which really suited the work."

- "Which part of it?"

"Well, this design, these lines are on a knife-edge, a frontier. They are birth and death at once. Which is something Beckett’s text exudes, too. Which is why whether it’s a screen or a 'curtain' or a piece of paper, it’s always inscribed in one dimension. One level. It’s the beginning and the end together... Because the "End" here reminds me of the title descending the screen at the end of a film. And it’s a state of ecstasy that arises from the 'reality' of the work. It’s a trance."

- "And how do this state, these images, differ from pop art?"

"It is pop art. This video we’re watching now, for instance, is playing around with the Sixties..."

- "And with psychedelia?"

"Yes."

- "Fine, but someone might wonder "Hey, how can he combine the floor from the Iveron monastery, which has its own particular experiences, octagonal cosmological symbols, mandalas, meditation and so on with a neo-pop or psychedelic idiom?"

"And what’s neo-pop? Exactly that... Jimmy Hendrix and Our Father who art in Heaven."

- "Apart from the obvious, is there any sort of concealment here? In your perforated curtains, for instance, through whose delicate fabric one sees and does not see?"

"There is the allure of the knife-edge again, of translucence in 2 dimensions."

- "Meaning you’re primarily interested in the surface. Does your work have a symbolic dimension?"

"Yes. Anyone can find any symbol they like in there. Meaning you see something and say: "Ah, that’s a garden" or a universal symbol. It’s whatever you see."

- "I asked you if your work was related this time to symbols because these patterns are joined together into mandalas, which are cosmic symbols, but also because the masters of abstraction—Mondrian, Kandinsky, Malevich, Kupka, Itten—were closely bound up with the metaphysical and its symbolism. And that’s no accident..."

"Metaphysical... Can’t we just say physical? That’s what I call it."

- "I’m not using 'metaphysical' in the sense of 'non-real' or to convey a suspicious or negative connotation. It's just that the geometric form is a symbol in itself. In this sense, it produces specific senses and ideas. For instance, there were the theosophical views of Mondrian, who defined the vertical as spirit and the horizontal as material, or the "spiritual component" of colours and shapes and what Kandinsky or Itten defined as geometrical harmony. That's what I'm talking about. Do the traditional, archetypal motifs you use reference symbolisms, or not?"

"I’m not interested in symbolisms. I use all that to shape another reality. What that reality has to say is another matter altogether. What matters to me is how you stand in front of an art-work. I don’t look at it head on, I perceive it at my side. It’s beside me, in other words. It’s something I perceive better with my shoulders and my back."

- "What do you mean exactly?"

"I mean you have to be exactly where the work is. To be present at a given time and place, that’s enough. And then you carry it around you as a memory."

- "That reminds me of what Zen teaches about the experience of the 'here and now'. You know that some people would refer to the minimal bamboo constructions you used to do as Zen constructions?"

"Why not... that’s Zen, too."

- "Do you think 21st-century art should return to the concept of the beautiful which came in for so much stick during the 20th?"

"I don’t think it came in for any stick. I’d say that beauty was held aloft again in both the 20th and 21st centuries. The concept of beauty is integral to art."

== Set design ==
In his years at the Athens School of Fine Arts, Alexiou met Dimitris Papaioannou, a stage director, choreographer, and visual artist. At the time, Papaioannou was a fellow pupil. The two men became friends and worked together on various projects. In 1990, Alexiou proposed a collaboration, using his own work as a base for Papaioannou to work upon. The result was The Last Song of Richard Strauss, which later became The Songs trilogy. The Last Song, a success for Papaioannou and the Omada Edafous Dance Theatre company, demonstrated work in the genre of set design. In 1993, Alexiou again collaborated with Dimitris Papaioannou in the production of Medea for the "Omada Edafous Dance Theatre company".

== Art collector ==
Alexiou began collecting art at a young age. In 2009, he curated an exhibition of his collection of works by 70 modern and contemporary artists at the Bazeos Tower in Naxos. The tower is a 17th-century tower that was built as a monastery. The collected artists included Adam Chodzko, Bernhard Cella, Amy O’Neill, Jim Shaw, Jimmie Durham, Andisheh Avini, Yuken Teruya, Antonis Kiriakoulis, Deanna Maganias, Giannoulis Chalepas, Elena Poka, Ilias Kafouros, Kostis Velonis, Dimitris Papaioannou, Mantalina Psoma, Emmanouil Zacharioudakis, Simon Periton, Marie Francoise Poutays, Mary Redmont, Michael Michaeledes, Minas, Spyros Litinas, Stephen Dean, Vasso Gavaisse, Lydia Venieri, Vangelis Vlahos and Yorgos Papountzis. The exhibition was an expression of the artistry of Alexiou (as much as his own work). The collected items paralleled his own development as an artist; the business of the final preparations of the exhibition reflected his passion; and the tower itself became an art subject itself in Alexiou's video productions of the day.

== List of works ==
Alexiou participated a large number of personal and group exhibitions. There are works which were never exhibited or are not known to the public. (The following list is not complete; it depicts only a selection of his known works).

== Solo exhibitions ==
=== pre 1994 ===
- Gallery 3, Athens (1985, 1987, 1989, 1994).
- ZM Gallery, Thessaloniki (1988).
- Desmos Art Gallery, Athens (1985).
- Innsbrucker Werkstatt, Innsbruck (1983).

=== 1998 ===
- Athens Art Gallery, Athens.

=== 2000 ===
- Museum of Contemporary Art of Crete in collaboration with "Tzamia Krystalla" Gallery, Hania
- "Lola Nikolaou Gallery", Thessaloniki.

=== 2001 ===
- Exerevnitis Gallery, Athens.

=== 2002 ===
- Gallery 3, Athens.

=== 2003 ===
- Lola Nikolaou Gallery, Thessaloniki
- Rebecca Camhi Gallery, Athens.

=== 2004 ===
- "Angel rolling up the Heaven" and "Red Pavillion", Unlimited Contemporary Art, Athens.
- "365" Art Project Gallery, Athens.

=== 2007 ===
- "The End", 52nd International Art Exhibition, La Biennale di Venezia, Venice, Greek Participation, Curator: Υorgos Tzirtzilakis.
- "The End", Zoumboulaki Gallery, Athens
- "The End", Françoise Heitsch Gallery, Munich

=== 2008 ===
- "The End", Museum of Byzantine Culture, Thessaloniki, Curator: Υorgos Tzirtzilakis.

=== 2010 ===
- "The Sense of Order"
- "Margini Arte Contemporanea", Toscana, Italy, Curator: Paolo Emilio Antognoli Viti.
- "San Marco di Venezia 2010"
- Zoumboulaki Gallery, Athens, Respondent: Emmanouil Zacharioudakis.

== Group exhibitions ==
=== 1980s ===
- "5th Biennale of Sculpture", Skironio Museum Polychronopoulos, Megara. (1985)
- "2nd Biennale of Young Mediterranean Artists" Thessaloniki. (1986)
- "Jeune Sculpture 87/1", Porte d' Austerlitz, Paris (1987)
- "3rd Biennale of Young Mediterranean Artists", Barcelona, Spain, curator. S. Papa (1987)
- "5 Greek Artists - 30 Works", Salle de Conference de la Communaute Europeenne, Brussels and Laiterie Centrale, Strasbourg, curator N. Misirli (1988)
- "Meetings, Highlights, Conflicts", Municipal Gallery, Athens, curator K.Stavropoulos (1988)
- "Revolution", French Institute, Athens (1989).

=== 1990s ===
- "Borderline 80-90", Municipal Art Gallery, Athens, cur. M. Stefanidis (1990).
- "Itérations", Danae Foundation, Pouilly, France (1990).
- "2nd Minos Beach Art Symposium", Minos Beach, Agios Nikolaos, Crete, cur. D. Koromilas (1990)
- "Spira 1", Circulo de Bellas Artes, Madrid, cur. S. Papa (1992)
- "Egoism", House of Cyprus, Athens, cur. K. Stavopoulos (1992)
- "Magasin", House of Cyprus, Athens, cur. A. Von Fürstenberg (1994)
- "International Meeting of Sculpture", European Cultural Centre of Delphi, Delphi, cur. S. Papa (1994)
- "Alexiou-Varotsos-Totsikas-Tsoklis", Mayia Tsoklis Gallery, Athens (1995)
- "Greek Artists - Quests 1950-2000", Centre for Contemporary Art, Rethymno, Crete, cur. M. Maragou (1998)
- "P + P = D", Deste Foundation, Athens, cur. Y. Tzirtzilakis (1999)

=== 2000–2002 ===
- "Glossalgia", Hellenic-American Union, Athens, cur. M. Stefanidis & N. Argyropoulou (2000).
- "P + P = D", Macedonian Museum of Contemporary Art, Thesasaloniki, cur. Y. Tzirtzilakis (2000).
- "The Pionners", L. Beltsios Collection, Kalambaka, cur. D. Zacharopoulos (2002)
- "The Magic", Ktima Pavlidi, Paiania, cur. M. Maragou.

=== 2003 ===
- "Outlook", Athens, cur. C. Joachimides.
- "Deste Prize 2003", Deste Foundation, Athens.
- "The Pioneers", L. Beltsios Collection, Macedonian Museum of Contemporary Art, Thesasaloniki, cur. D. Zacharopoulos.
- "Free Transit", Zappeio, Athens and Porto Caras, Halkidiki, Greece, cur N. Argyropoulou.
- "Sketching Out Today, Tomorrow, Yesterday", Macedonian Museum of Contemporary Art, Thesasaloniki, cur. L. Tsikouta.

=== 2004–2006 ===
- "Athens by Art", Athens, cur. C. Petrinou. (2004)
- "Breakthrough!" Greece, Sala Alcala 31, Madrid, cur. K. Gregos, D. Zacharopoulos, S. Papa. (2004)
- "Aus der Ferne, Aus der Nahe, Aus der Mitte", European Patent Office, Munich, cur. F. Heitsch, M. Poalas. (2004)
- "Aus der Ferne, Aus der Nähe, Aus der Mitte", Galerie Françoise Heitsch, Munich. (2004)
- "23rd Biennale of Alexandria", Alexandria, Egypt, cur. C. Petrinou (2005).
- "An Outing", L. Beltsios Collection, Trikala, cur. S. Bahtsertzis (2006).
- "The Scarecrow", Institution E. Averof, Metsovo, cur. Ο. Danyilopoulou (2006)
- "23rd Biennale of Alexandria", Benaki Museum, Athens, cur. C. Petrinou (2006)
- "22 Winter Festival Seragevo", Hotel Evropa, Sarajevo, cur. C. Petrinou (2006)
- "Totems of the City", METRO Underground Station, Chalandri, Athens, cur. T. Moutsopoulos (2006)
- "Apolis", Hellenic American Union, Athens, cur. C. Velonis (2006)

=== 2007 ===
- "Disco Coppertone", Locus Athens and OLP Piraeus, cur. Maria Thalia Karas and Sofia Tournikiotis
- "Heterotopias: Recreation maid in Greece", 1st Biennale of Contemporary Art Thessaloniki, Thessaloniki, cur. T. Stefanidou
- "Locus Athens - The Workshop", Zouboulakis Gallery, cur. Maria Thalia Karas and Sofia Tournikiotis, Athens

=== 2008 ===
- "Athensville", Parallel Plan, Art Athina cur. M. Fokidis
- "Games without Frontiers", Zoumboulaki Gallery, Athens, cur, T. Stathopoulos.
- "Summer 2008", Zoumboulaki Gallery, Athens.
- "Connected", Spilioti Projects Gallery, Athens

=== 2009–2010 ===
- "Expanded Ecologies", National Museum of Contemporary Art, Athens, Cur. Daphne Vitali
- "Celestial Contrakt", Schwartz Gallery, London, Cur. Christina Mitrentse and Jonas Ranson.

== Set design projects ==
=== 1991 - 1993 ===
- "The Songs", in collaboration with "Edafos Dance Theatre", Artists' Building, Athens (17 April 1991)
- "Κατζούρμπος", L. Vogiatzis director (1993)
- "Ηλέκτρας κομμοί - Aeschylus, Sophocles, Euripides", Roula Pateraki, director. Athens Concert Hall, Athens, (November 1993)

=== Medea (from 1993) ===
- K.N.S. Theatre, Antwerp, Belgium, (28–29 September 1993)
- Kotopouli, Rex Theatre, Athens, Greece, (20–25 April 1994)
- Ypsikaminos, Patra, Greece, (May 1994)
- Argos Ancient Theatre, Argos, Greece, (June 1994)
- 2nd International Dance Festival, Kalamata, Greece, (July 1996)
- 4th Festival of Contemporary Expressionistic Dance, Chania, Greece, (August 1996)
- Ferres and Komotini, Greece, (August 1996)
- 1st Musical Theater Meeting, Ancient Dimitriada, Volos, Greece, (September 1996)
- Melina Merkouri Amphitheatre, Veroia, Greece, (September 1996)
- Dassos Theatre, Thessaloniki, Greece, (17–18 September 1996)
- Vrachon Theatre, Melina Merkouri, Athens, Greece, (October 1996)
- Riverside Studios, London, UK, (12–14 March 1998)
- Anfiteatro na Doca, EXPO '98, Lisbon, Portugal, (July 1998)
- Theater De La Croix Rousse, 8th Biennale of Dance, Lyon, France, (14-18 September 1998)
- Pattichio City Theater, Limassol, Cyprus, (September 1998)
- City Theater, Nicosia, Cyprus, (September 1998)
- Anderson Center for the Arts, Concert Theater, Binghamton University; Performing Arts Center, Albany University; The Performing Arts Center, Purchase College, New York, USA, (9-16 October 1999)
- Atatürk Kultural CentGrand Hall, 12th International Istanbul Theatre Festival, Istanbul, Turkey, (18 May 2000)
- Gerard Bechar Theatre, DancEuropa Festival, Jerusalem, Israel, (June 2000)
- Suzanne Dellal Center, Tel Aviv, Israel, (June 2000)
- Papagou Municipal Theater, Athens, Greece, (June–July 2000)
- Nikos Kazantzakis Theatre, Heraklion, Greece, (July 2000)
- San Marino Stage Festival, San Marino, (August 2000)

=== 1994–1995 ===
- "Memoria del Olvido", directed and choreographed by Denise Perdikidis, Teatro Olimpia de Madrid and tour in Germany, Switzerland, Festival de Teatro Clásico de Mérida, Dansa Valencia, Cabildo Insular de Las Palmas de Gran Canaria, (1994).
- "Suppliants - Aeschylus", directed by Stavros Doufexis, light design by Nikos Alexiou and Eleftheria Deco, Ancient Theatre of Epidaurus, (1994).
- "Medea - Euripides", directed by Giorgos Lazanis, set light and costume design by Nikos Alexiou, Ancient Theatre of Epidaurus, (1995).

=== 2007–2011 ===
- "Το Αμάρτημα της Μητρός μου", directed by Kostis Kapelonis, Karolos Koun Theater of Art, (2007).
- "Meet in Beijing", "Athens Festival", National Centre for the Performing Arts, Beijing, (1 and 2 August 2008) and Pallas Theatre, Athens, (from 1 October 2008).
- "Medea 2", Dimitris Papaioannou
- "Schreber’s nervous illness", directed by Stelios Krasanakis, Alekton Theatre.
- "La Puppe", directed by Anna Kokkinou, Theatre Sfendoni.
- "Ταξιδεύοντας με τον ΠΑΟΚ", directed by Kostis Kapelonis, Karolos Koun Theater of Art, (2011).

== Bibliography ==
- Patterns 2. Design, Art and Architecture Barbara Glasner, Ed. Schmidt Petra (2008)
- The End, Catalogue for the 52nd Intemational Art Exhibition, La Biennale di Venezia, (2007), Greek Participation, Curator: Υorgos Tzirtzilakis, Authors: Dimitris Liakos, Christopher Marinos and Υorgos Tzirtzilakis, Ministry of Culture, Athens (2007).
- Nikos Alexiou - Angel rolling up the Heavens, Alexandra Koroxenides and Christina Petrinou, Cube Art Editions (2005).
- Nikos Triantaphyllou on Nikos' Alexiou collection, kaput magazine, https://web.archive.org/web/20160307013400/http://www.kaput.gr/gr/10/final-thoughts-and-conclusions-on-the-nikos-alexiou-collection/
- Breakthrough!, Grecia 2004, K. Gregos, S. Papa and D. Zacharopoulos, Comunidad de Madrid, (2004)
- Ausderferne ausdernähe ausdermitte, Kristine Schönert, Sotirios Bahtsertzis and Thanassis Moutsopoulos, European Patent Office Munich, (2004).
- Outlook curated by Christos M. Joachimides, authors Yorgos Tzirtzilakis, Daniel Birnbaum, Boris Groys, Arthur C. Danto, Nicolas Bourriaud and Nikos Daskalothanassis, Athens (2003).
- The Pioneers, L. Beltsios Collection, D. Zacharopoulos, Futura editions, (2002)
- Spira I, Sania Papa, Circulo De Bellas Artes Madrit, Greek Minister of Culture, European Cultural Center of Delphi, (1992).
- "Athens - Ancient and Modern: Athens in the Twenty-First Century", Marina Kotzamani, PAJ: A Journal of Performance and Art, Volume 31, Number 2, May 2009 (PAJ 92)
- "Was bedeuten all die wilden Kringel?", Michael Pilz Die Welt (16 November 2007).
- "I Padiglioni dei Sensi", Laura Larcan La Repubblica (9 June 2007)
- "De Venise à Athènes, les biennales se suivent et se ressemblent", Georges Férou, L' Humanité (7 July 2007).
- "L’art contemporain en Grèce, de Byzance à Venise", Yves Kobry L' Humanité (7 July 2007).
- "Nikos Alexiou", Alexandra Koroxenidis, Frieze Magazine Issue 74,(April 2003).
- "An artist’s vision of Mount Athos", Alexandra Koroxenidis, Kathimerini (English edition) (5 February 2003)
- "Nikos Alexiou, diversified artist, full of surface contradictions", Alexandra Koroxenidis, Kathimerini (English edition) (15 November 2001).
