= Raulet =

Raulet is a surname. Notable people with the surname include:

- David H. Raulet (fl. 1983), American immunologist
- Gérard Raulet (born 1949), French philosopher, Germanist, and translator
- Jean-Daniel Raulet (born 1946), French racing driver
