= Buchmann Galerie =

The Buchmann Galerie is an international contemporary art gallery with locations in Berlin, Germany and in Lugano in the Swiss canton of Ticino.

== History ==
Founded in 1975 in St. Gallen, Switzerland, the gallery has been located in the city center of Lugano since 2013. In Germany, the gallery opened in 1995. Since 2005, it has run two adjacent exhibition spaces in Berlin to host two parallel shows or one comprehensive exhibition.

The Berlin gallery regularly hosts solo exhibitions of its artists, often with remarkable large-format paintings or sculptures, in addition to thematic exhibitions such as the group show Keramik in 2023.

The Buchmann Galerie initiated and developed Tony Cragg’s drawing archive and represents it for the artist. In this capacity, the gallery was involved in the artist’s exhibition at the Nordic Watercolour Museum in 2007.

Since 2008 André Buchmann has been a member of the board of the Cragg Foundation Wuppertal.

== Artists ==
The gallery represents international mid-career and established artists with a focus on sculpture and painting.

- Anna & Bernhard Blume
- Daniel Buren
- Pedro Cabrita Reis
- Lawrence Carroll
- Tony Cragg
- Martin Disler
- Alberto Garutti
- Wolfgang Laib
- Jason Martin
- Tatsuo Miyajima
- Wilhelm Mundt
- Bettina Pousttchi
- Fiona Rae
- Joel Sternfeld
- William Tucker
- Clare Woods
