= Wilhelm Wartmann =

Swiss art historian

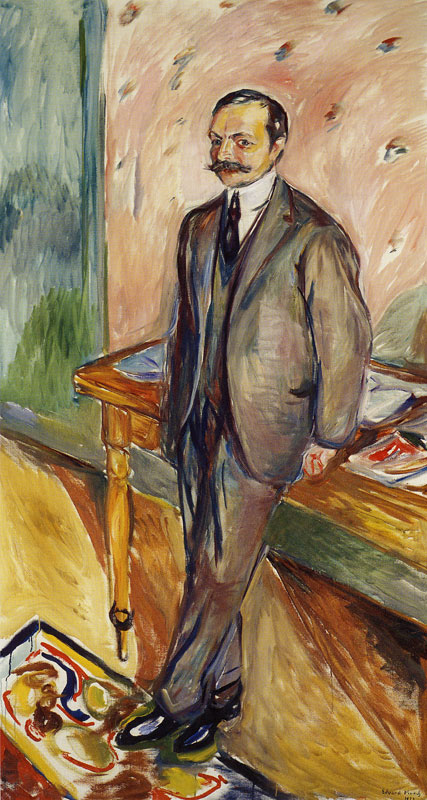
Edvard Munch: Portrait of Wilhelm Wartmann

Jakob Wilhelm Wartmann (20 July 1882 in St. Gallen – 28 July 1970 in Zurich) was a Swiss art historian. He directed the Kunsthaus Zürich from 1909 to 1949.

== Early life ==
Wilhelm Wartmann was born in 1882, the son of the historian Hermann Wartmann (1835–1929) and his wife Louise, née Hochreutiner. He grew up in St. Gallen and attended the Gymnasium of the Kantonsschule am Burggraben there. He then studied classical philology and history at the University of Zurich from 1902. He then continued his studies at the University of Paris and received his doctorate with the thesis Les vitraux suisses au Musée du Louvre on Swiss stained glass in the Louvre.

== Kunsthaus Zurich ==
Wartmann came to the Kunsthaus Zürich in 1909, whose building, designed by the architect Karl Moser, was opened the following year. He started as first secretary of the Zürcher Kunstgesellschaft, and from 1925 he was director of the museum. Wartmann initially concentrated on Swiss art, acquiring works of late Gothic painting and paintings by Johann Heinrich Füssli in addition to contemporary works. Among the important exhibitions of the first decade was a large show of paintings by Ferdinand Hodler in 1917. In the same year, Wartmann was one of the co-founders of the Vereinigung Zürcher Kunstfreunde (Zurich Art Friends Association), which continues to support the Kunsthaus in its acquisitions to this day. In 1920, the collection of Hans Schuler was bequeathed to the Kunsthaus. With paintings by Pierre-Auguste Renoir, Paul Cézanne, Vincent van Gogh and Pierre Bonnard, works of French Impressionism and Late Impressionism could be shown for the first time. Wartmann organized an exhibition of paintings by the Norwegian Edvard Munch in 1922. The Kunsthaus later acquired the largest Munch collection outside Scandinavia, including Munch's portrait "Dr. Wilhelm Wartmann". Wartmann also acquired paintings by other Expressionist painters. He gathered significant works by artists such as Lovis Corinth, Oskar Kokoschka and Ferdinand Hodler.

Wartmann's term of office saw the extension to Karl Moser's design in 1925, enlarging the Kunsthaus' exhibition space. He championed Félix Vallotton, to whom he dedicated exhibitions in 1928 and 1938. He also purchased several works by the artist. In 1929 he showed current artistic trends of surrealism in the exhibition Abstract and Surrealist Painting and Sculpture. Wartmann dedicated the first comprehensive retrospective outside France to Pablo Picasso in 1932.

In 1933 he put on exhibitions with works by Fernand Léger and Juan Gris. Wartmann was a member of the Federal Art Commission from 1939 to 1944. In 1949, shortly before the end of his term, he integrated Leopold Ružička's art collection into the Kunsthaus Zürich, adding 17th-century Dutch works to the collection.

His writings include numerous essays on art history, most of which he published in the monthly journal Das Kunsthaus, which he edited. In 1950 René Wehrli, who had already been his assistant since 1943, succeeded him as director.

Wartmann was married to Anna Hedwig Ruch (1900–1980) and had two daughters. He died in Zurich in 1970.

== Literature ==
- Walter Kern: Zum Rücktritt von Direktor Dr. Wilhelm Wartmann. In: Schweizer Monatsschrift für Architektur, Kunst und künstlerisches Gewerbe, Nr. 37, Bund Schweizer Architekten, Winterthur 1950.
