= Klaus Ottmann =

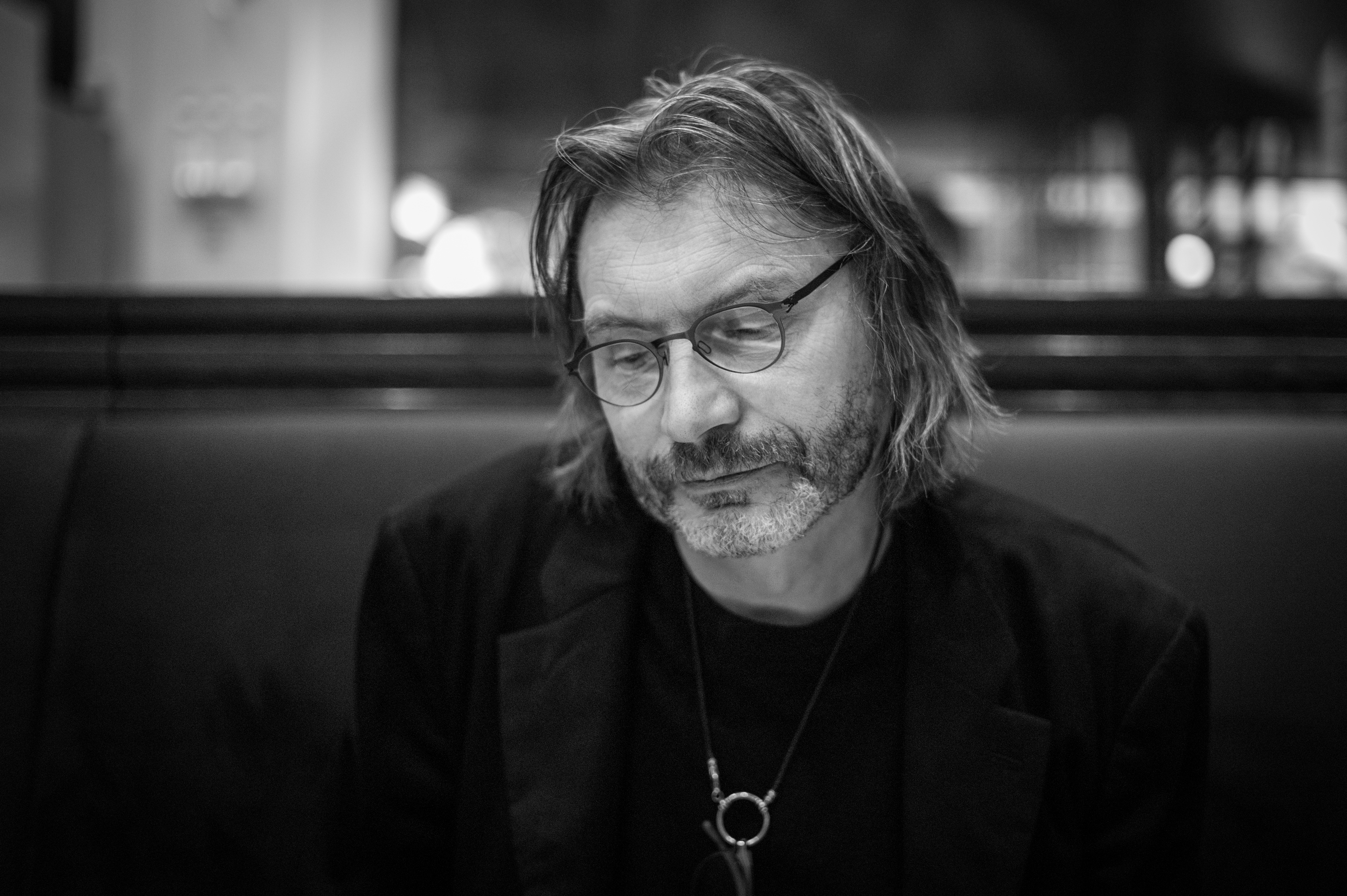

Klaus Ottmann (born 1954 in Nuremberg, West Germany) is a writer, art curator and publisher. He is Chief Curator Emeritus at The Phillips Collection in Washington, D.C. In 2016, Dr. Ottmann was conferred the insignia of Chevalier of France’s Order of Arts and Letters by the French ministry of culture and communication. In 2023, he received the Extraordinary Contribution to The Phillips Collection Award.

== Biography ==
Ottmann received a M.A. in philosophy from the Freie Universität Berlin, Germany, and a Ph.D. in philosophy from the Division of Media and Communications at the European Graduate School in Saas-Fee, Switzerland.

Ottmann is the publisher and editor of Spring Publications, which publishes books on archetypal psychology, symbolic imagination, art and the philosophy of art, phenomenology, the philosophy of psychology, religion, mysticism, and gnosis.

== Books ==
- Wolfgang Laib: A Retrospective, ISBN 3-7757-0944-4
- The Essential Mark Rothko, ISBN 0-8109-5826-0
- James Lee Byars: Life, Love, and Death, ISBN 3-7757-1368-9
- The Genius Decision: The Extraordinary and the Postmodern Condition, ISBN 978-0-88214-575-4
- Thought Through My Eyes: Writings on Art, 1977–2005, ISBN 978-0-88214-578-5
- Overcoming the Problematics of Art: The Writings of Yves Klein, ISBN 978-0-88214-568-6 (translator)
- Your Very Humble and Very Affectionate Servant: The Letters of Nicolas Poussin, 1630–1665, ISBN 978-0-88214-191-6 (translator)
