= Composition with Red, Blue and Yellow =

1930 painting by Piet Mondrian

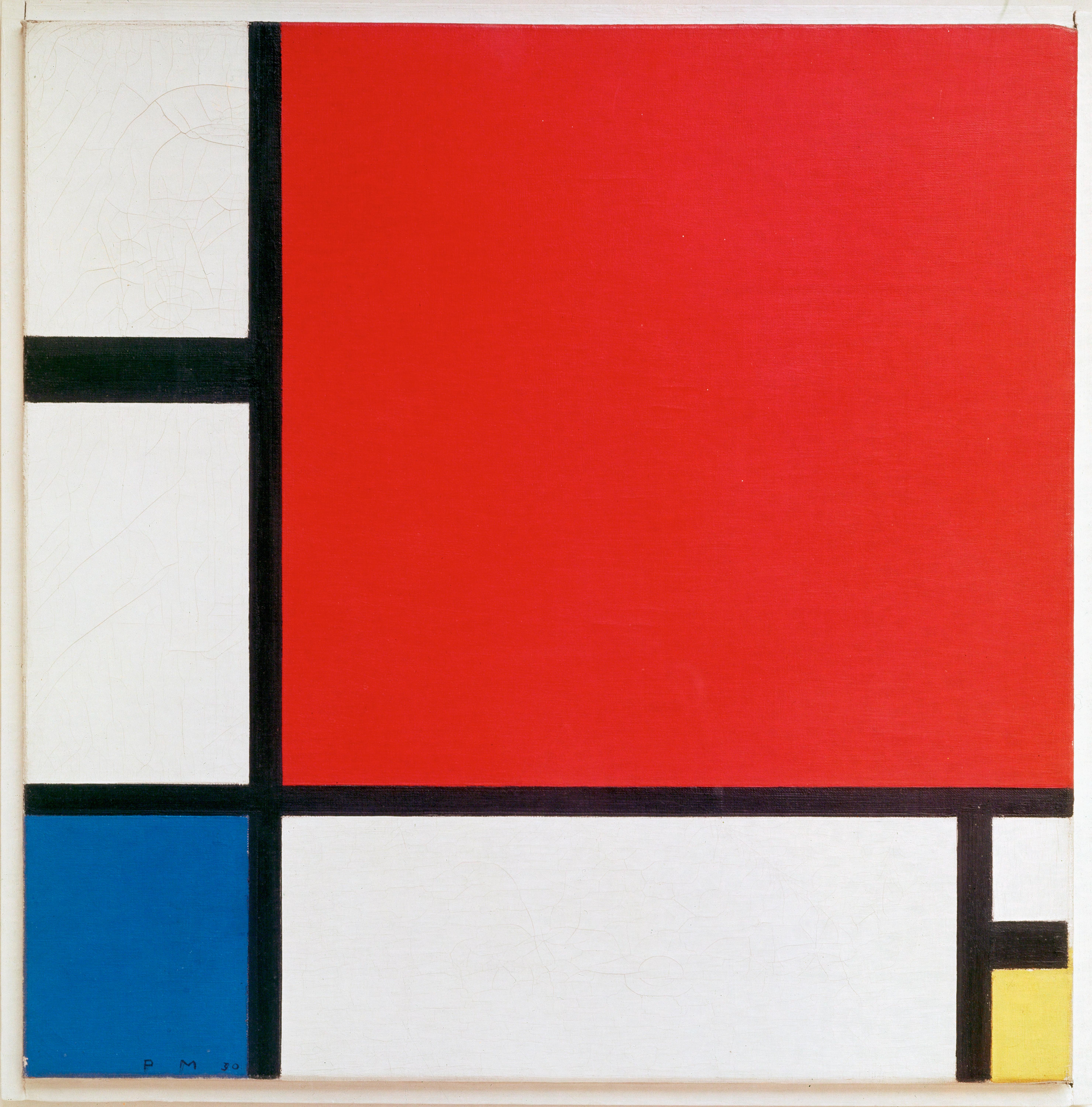
- Artist: Piet Mondrian
- Year: 1930
- Type: Oil on canvas
- Dimensions: 45 cm × 45 cm (17.7165 in × 17.7165 in)
- Location: Kunsthaus Zürich, Zürich

Composition with Red, Blue and Yellow is an oil on canvas painting by Piet Mondrian, from 1930.

== Description and analysis ==
It consists of thick, black brushwork, defining the borders of colored rectangles. As the title suggests, the only colors used in it besides black and white are red, blue, and yellow. The piece is very similar to Mondrian's 1930 Composition II in Red, Blue, and Yellow. According to Stephanie Chadwick, an associate professor of art history at Lamar University, "Mondrian's Composition with Red, Blue, and Yellow demonstrates his commitment to relational opposites, asymmetry, and pure planes of color. Mondrian composed this painting as a harmony of contrasts that signifies both balance and the tension of dynamic forces."

It is currently in the Kunsthaus Zürich, having been donated by Alfred Roth in 1987.
