= Andreas Leo Findeisen =

- Born: 1967 (age 58–59)
- Education: Classical languages, philosophy and composition
- Known for: Media theory, media art, writing, composition
- Awards: DAAD scholarship

Andreas Leo Findeisen (also credited as Leo Findeisen; born 1967) is a Vienna-based media theorist, author and composer. He studied classical languages, philosophy, theology and composition in Germany, Israel and Austria. His work is situated in the fields of media art, media philosophy and cultural theory.

Findeisen was associated with the Institute for Cultural Philosophy and Media Theory at the Academy of Fine Arts Vienna, where he worked in the context of Peter Sloterdijk's chair. He has published on Sloterdijk's work, including an essay on the philosopher's Spheres project.

He is a founding member of the platforms Empty Europe, Serious Pop, Transforming Freedom, X-OP and Future Fluxus. Findeisen has also been a fellow at WORM Rotterdam.

He has served in advisory, pre-jury and jury functions for institutions and festivals including Ars Electronica's Digital Communities category, Europan 6, the Vilém Flusser Theory Award at transmediale and the Lead Awards Hamburg.

== Selected publications ==
- Die Kunst des Verweilens. With Andreas Leo Findeisen and Hemma Schmutz. Edition Ostblick, 2006.
