= Zürcher Kunstgesellschaft =

Nonprofit arts group in Zurich, Switzerland

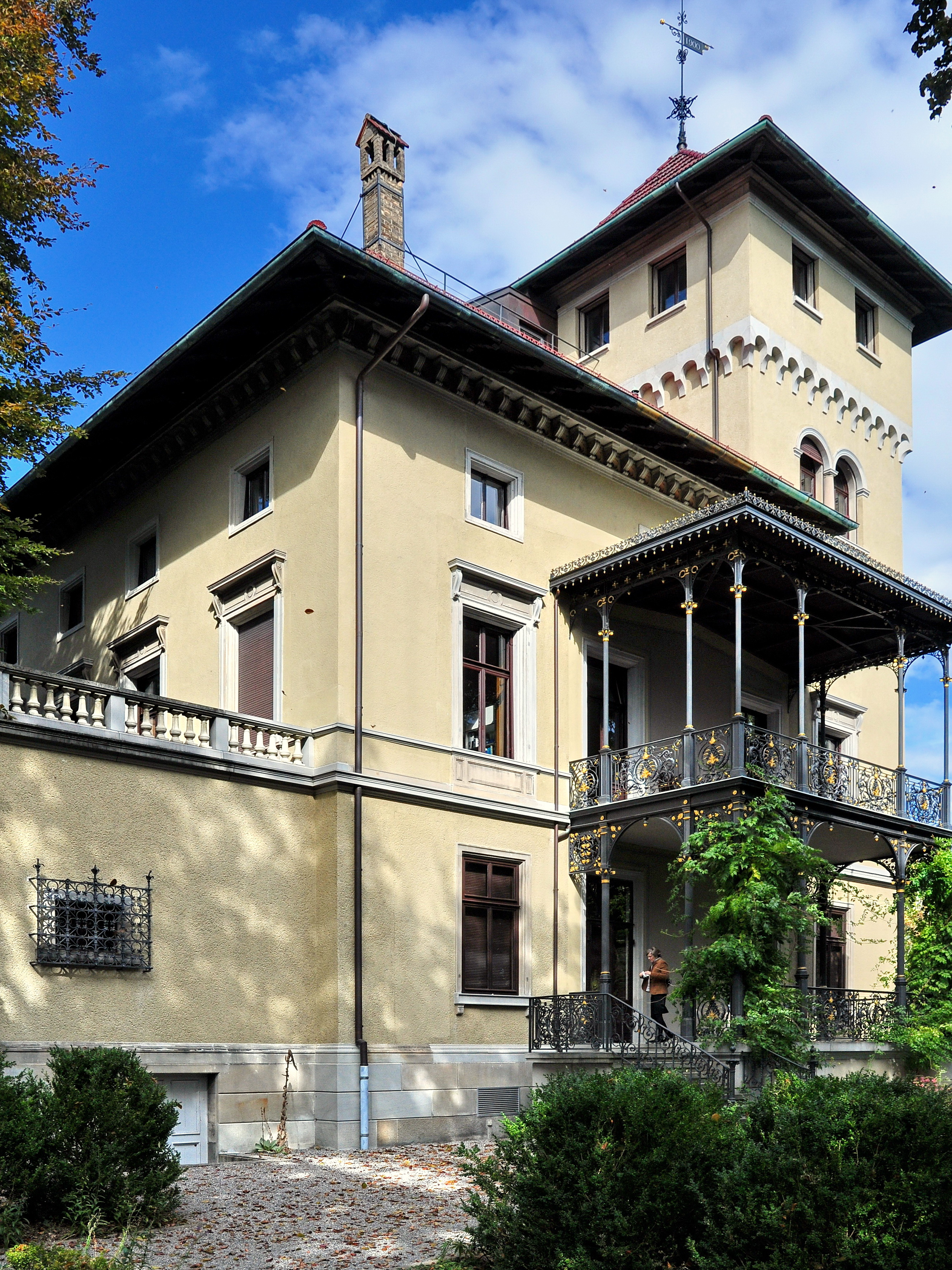
- Headquarters at Villa Tobler
- Formation: June 8, 1911; 115 years ago
- Headquarters: Villa Tobler; Winkelwiese 4; 8001 Zürich, Switzerland
- President: Philipp Hildebrand
- Website: kunsthaus.ch (in German)

Zürcher Kunstgesellschaft (English: Zurich Art Society) is an independent nonprofit organization which operates Kunsthaus Zürich art museum since its formation in 1787 and also acts as the controlling owner of its permanent collection. Officially assembled in 1911, the society currently counts over 24,000 members (2022) and is among the largest art societies in Europe. Since 2022, the society is presided by Philipp Hildebrand, former president of the Swiss National Bank.
