= Kunsthaus Zürich =

Art museum in Zürich, Switzerland

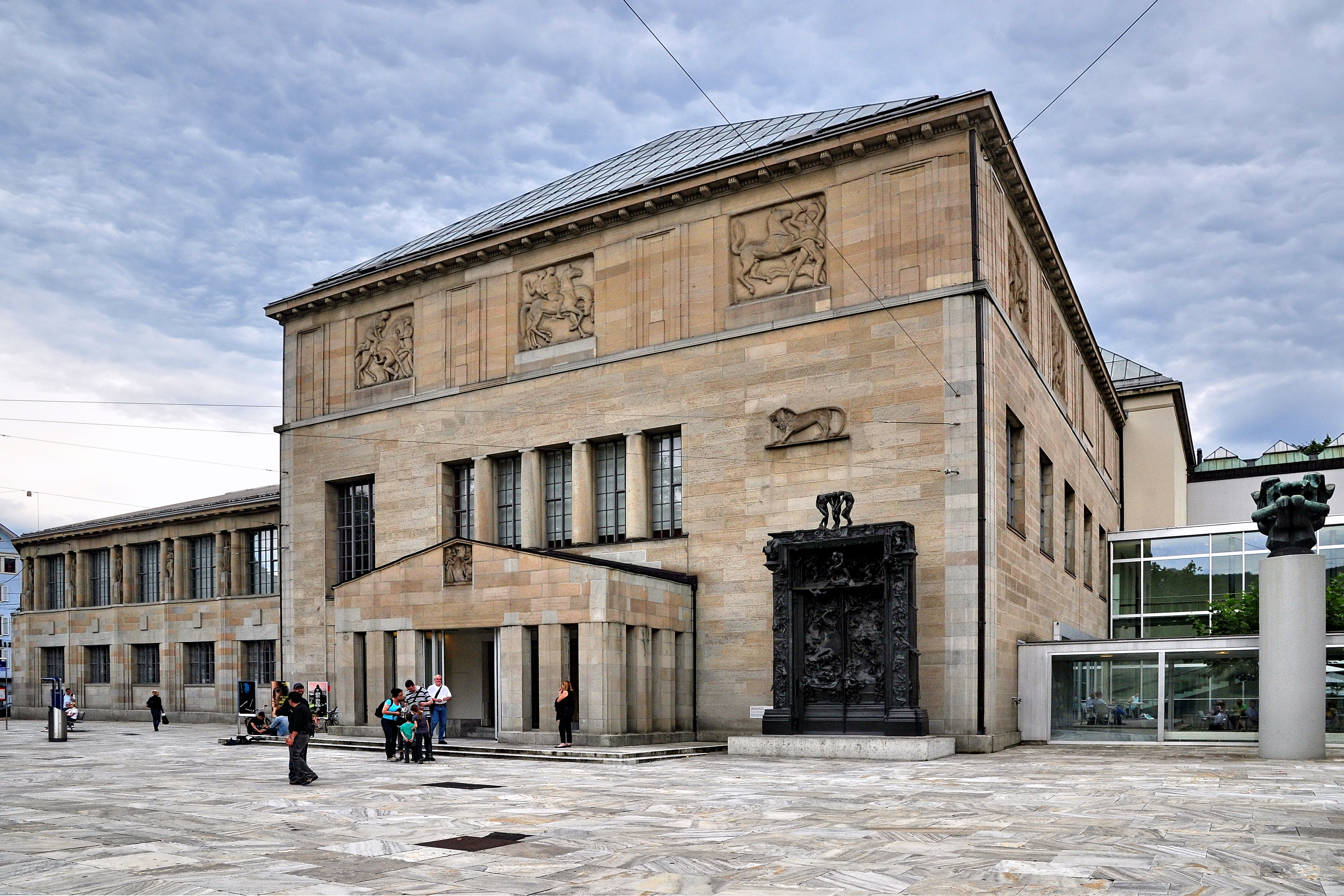
- Kunsthaus Zürich in 2011
- Interactive fullscreen map
- Location: Zurich, Switzerland
- Coordinates: 47°22′13″N 8°32′53″E
- Director: Ann Demeester
- Website: www.kunsthaus.ch

The Kunsthaus Zürich is an art museum in Zurich. It is the biggest art museum in Switzerland by area and houses one of the most important art collections in Switzerland, assembled over time by the Zürcher Kunstgesellschaft, a nonprofit art society. The collection spans from the Middle Ages to contemporary art, with an emphasis on Swiss art.

== Architecture ==
The old museum part was drawn-up by architects Karl Moser and Robert Curjel and opened in 1910. Particularly notable are the several preserved Moser interiors in the original section of the museum, decorated in masterful Neo-Grec version of Secession style. The bas-reliefs on the facade are by Moser's longtime collaborator Oskar Kiefer. The original museum building was extended in 1925, 1958 and 1976.

A $230 million extension by London-based David Chipperfield was opened in 2020. An extension building with a usable area of 13,000 square meters, which corresponds to an increase in the size of the Kunsthaus by more than 80%, began operations on 9 October 2021. Half of the extension's budget came from the city and canton of Zurich, with the other half provided by private donors. Chipperfield's design is a massive rectangular sandstone-covered building. The Kunsthaus will become the largest Swiss art museum, overtaking the Kunstmuseum Basel in the available space but not the collection. The two upper floors will be for art, with facilities at ground level and a basement link under the street to the original museum across the street in Heimplatz.

Lydia Escher (1858–1891), being a prominent Zurich patron of the arts, was honored by the Gesellschaft zu Fraumünster association on the occasion of her 150th anniversary by a commemorative plaque, located at the front of the building. The place was dedicated on 20 August 2008 by the city of Zurich as Lydia Welti-Escher Hof.

== Collection ==
The museum's collection includes major works by artists including Joseph Beuys, Claude Monet (several works including an enormous water lily painting), Edvard Munch, Pablo Picasso, Jacques Lipchitz and the Swiss Alberto Giacometti. Other Swiss artists such as Johann Heinrich Füssli, Ferdinand Hodler or from recent times, Pipilotti Rist and Peter Fischli are also represented. In addition, works by Vincent van Gogh, Édouard Manet, Henri Matisse and René Magritte can be found here.

== Management ==
=== Leadership ===
- 1909–1949: Wilhelm Wartmann
- 1950–1975: René Wehrli
- 1976–2000: Felix Baumann
- 2000–2022: Christoph Becker
- 2022–present: Ann Demeester

=== Attendance ===
In 2021, the Kunsthaus had 382,603 visitors. On Wednesday admission to the Collection is free of charge for all visitors.

== Public transport ==
The gallery is served by a stop on the Zurich tram system, known as Zürich, Kunsthaus. This is located on Heimplatz, between the museum building and the Schauspielhaus Zürich.

== Gallery ==
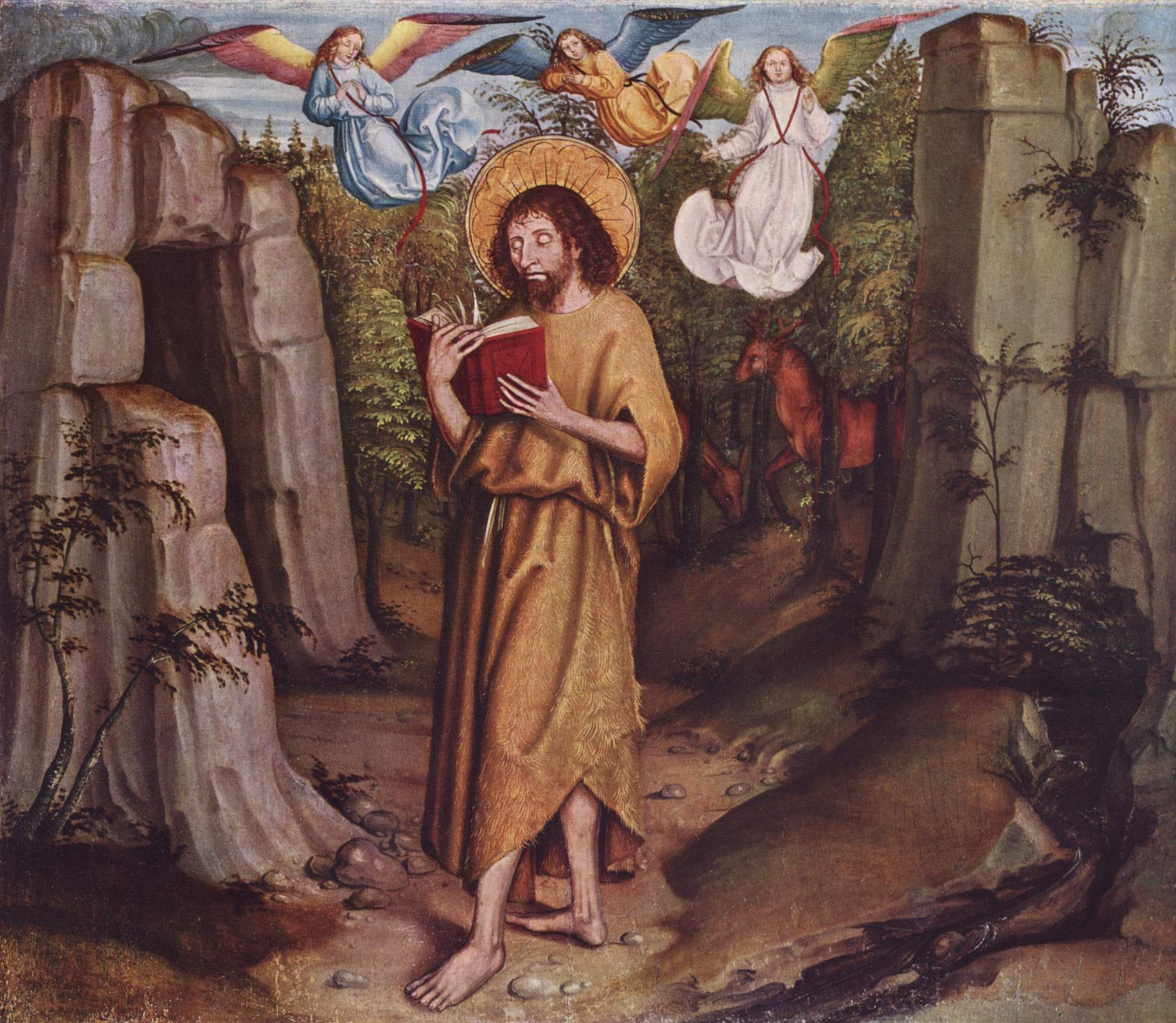
Berner Nelkenmeister, Johannes der Täufer in der Wüste

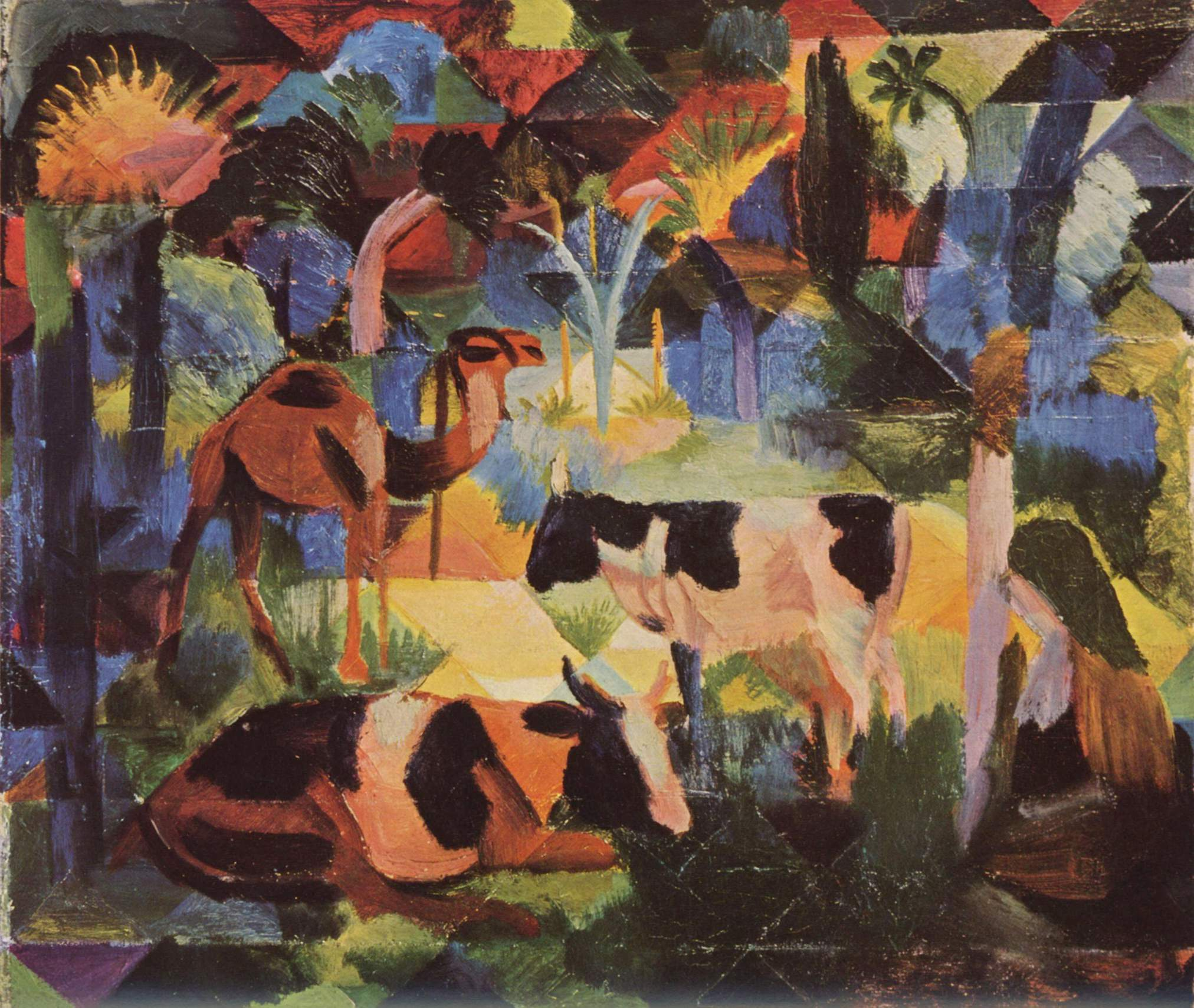
August Macke, Landscape with Cows and Camel

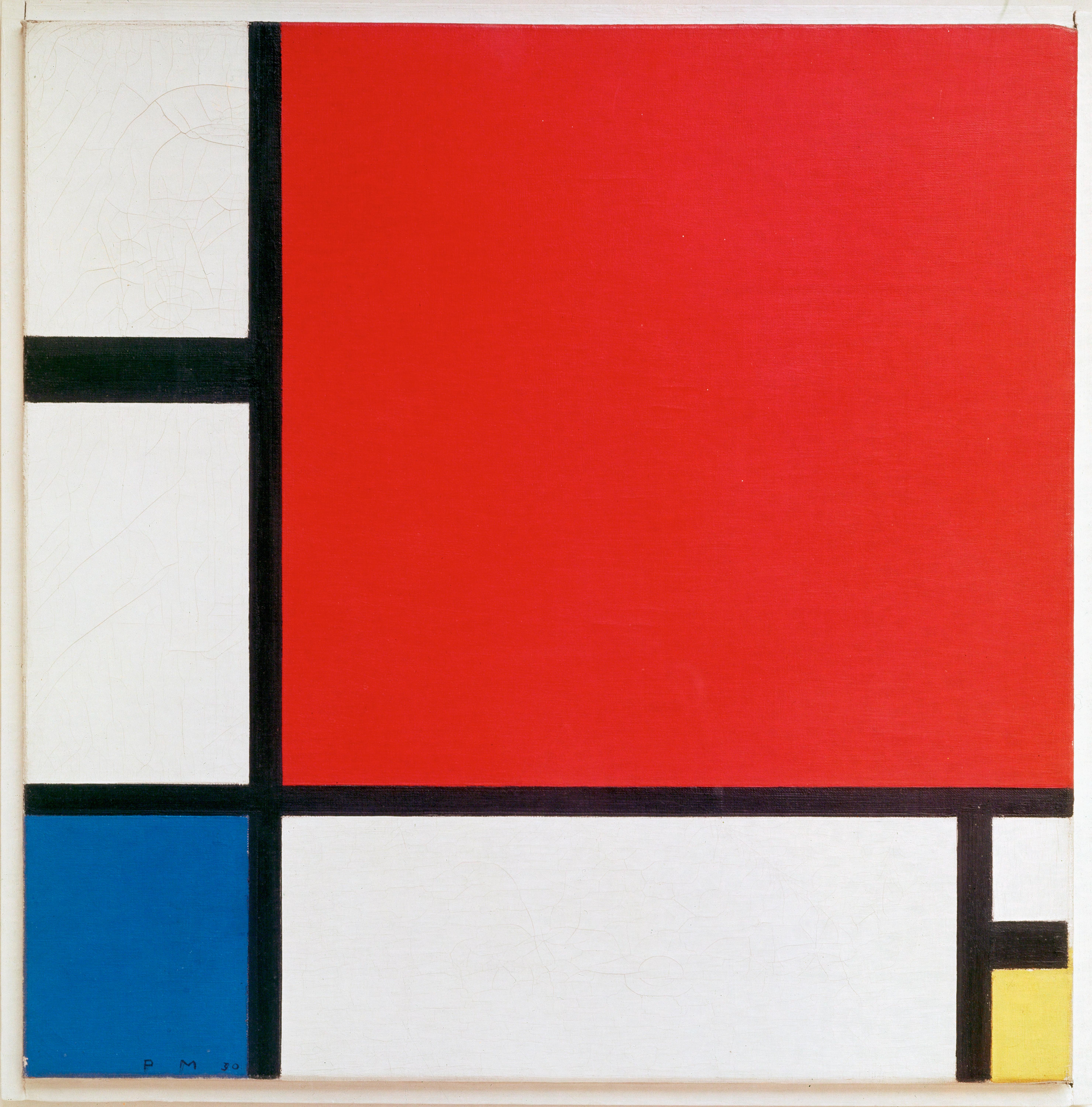
Piet Mondrian, Composition with Red, Blue and Yellow
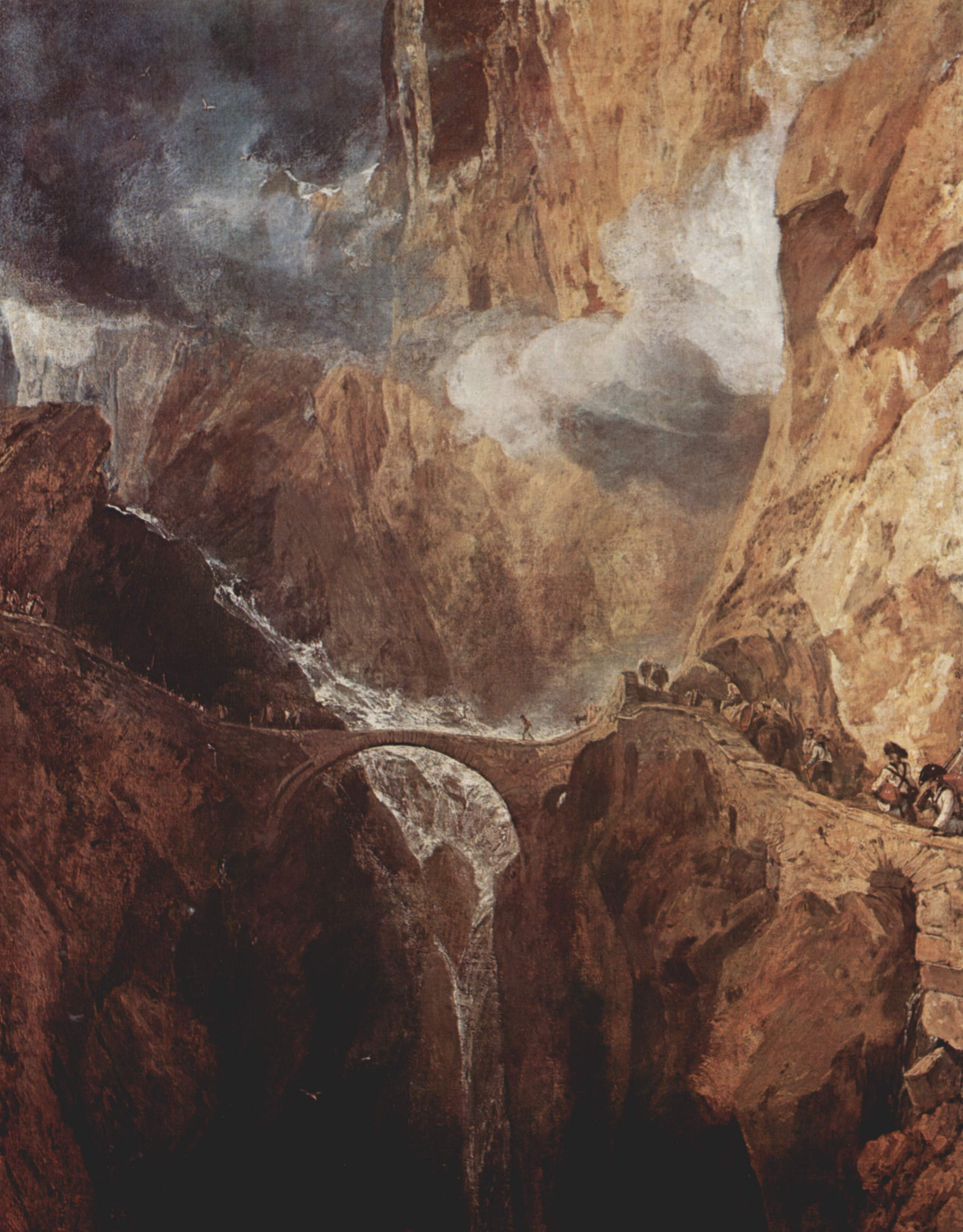
J. M. William Turner, Die Teufelsbrücke St. Gotthard

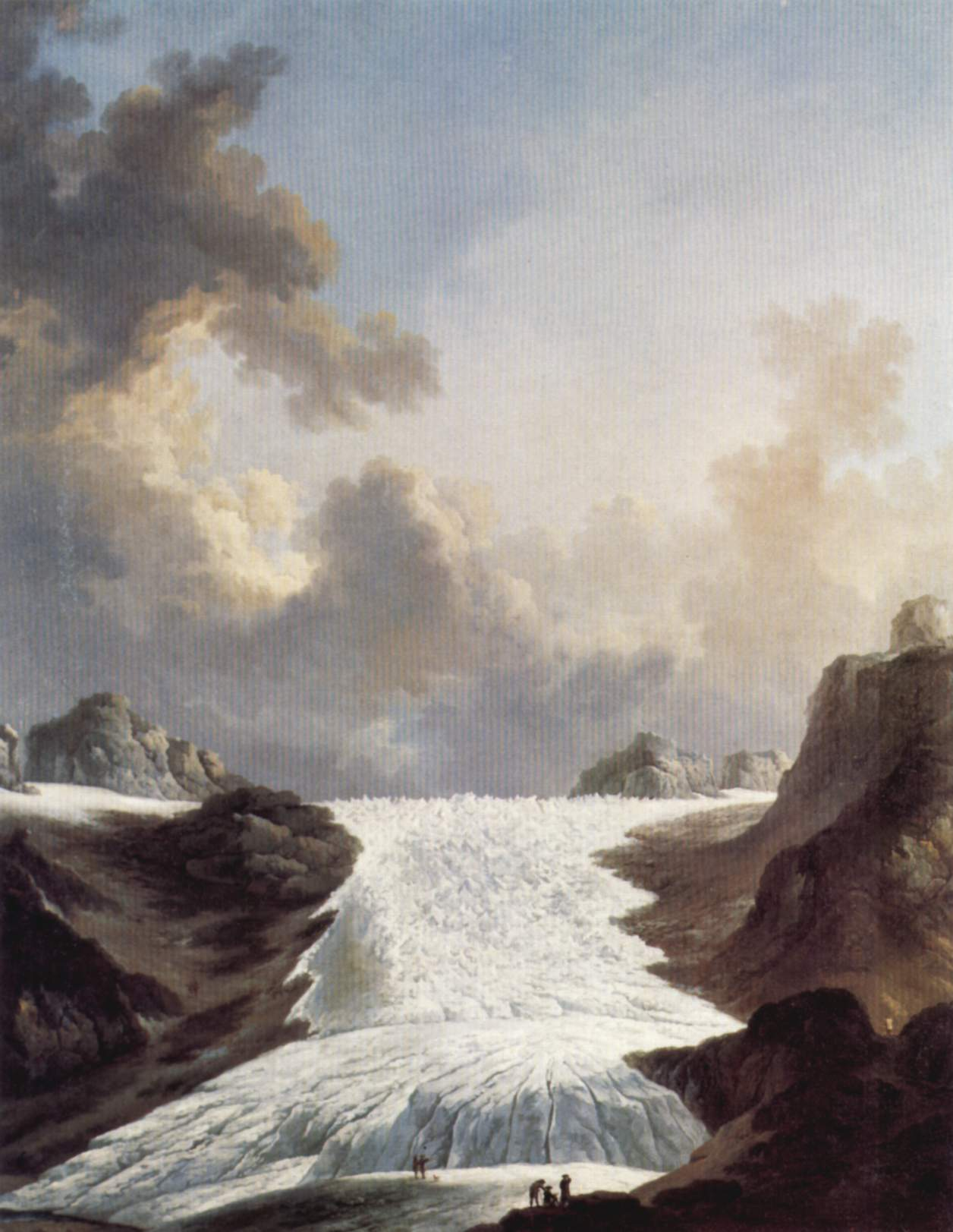
Johann Heinrich Wüest, Der Rhonegletscher

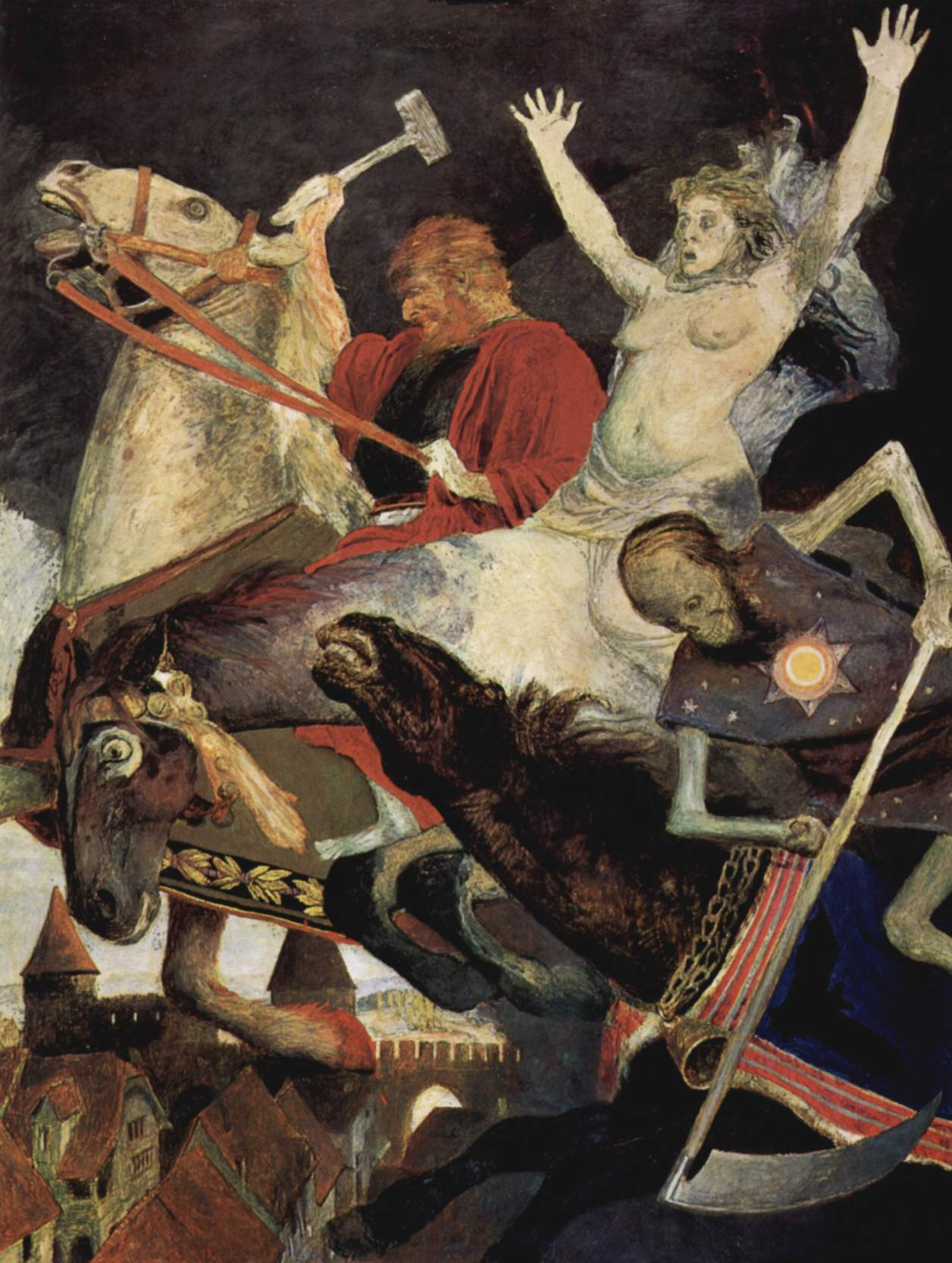
Arnold Böcklin, Der Krieg

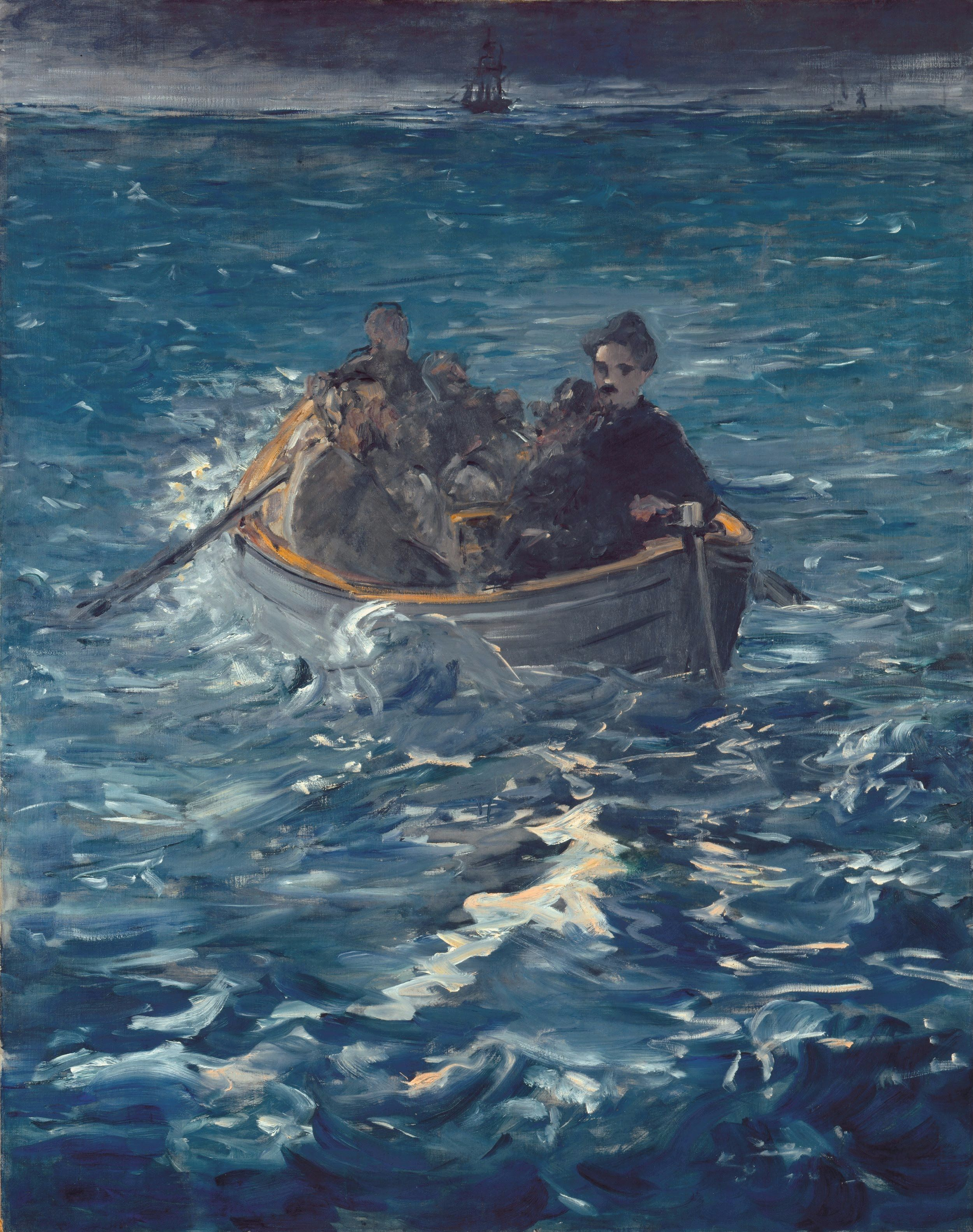
Édouard Manet, Die Flucht des Rochefort

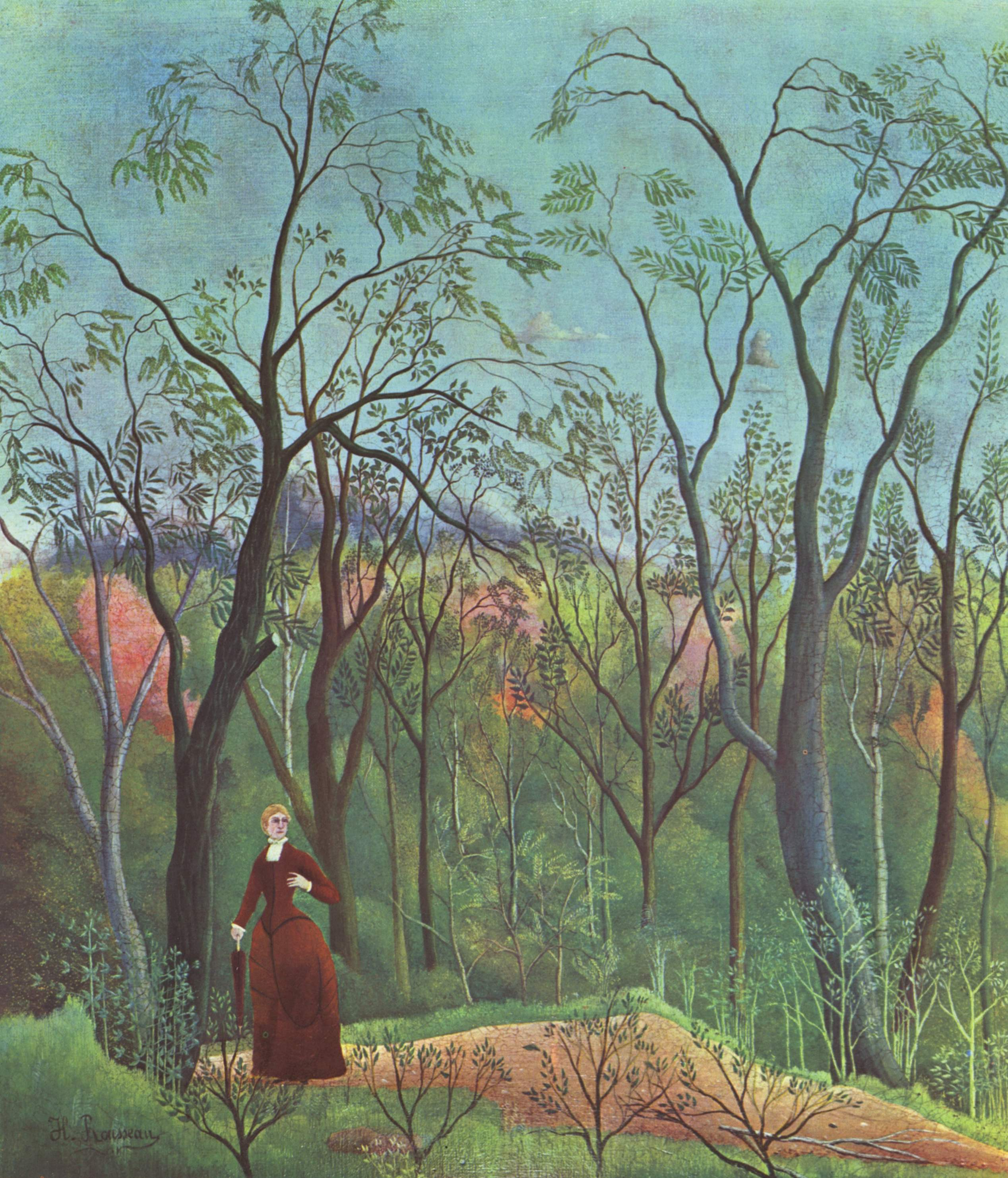
Henri Rousseau, Am Waldrand

== Controversy ==
The integrated artworks from the collection of the arms dealer Emil Bührle has caused discussion and criticism due to concern that some of the artworks may have been sold under duress by Jews persecuted by Nazis during the Third Reich. Critics say that the ownership history of the artworks has not been sufficiently clarified and, in January 2021, a petition was launched to demand access for impartial international researchers. In October 2023, a panel of academics hired to rectify incorrect or misleading Nazi-era provenances resigned in protest over the way the history was presented.

== See also ==
- List of largest art museums
- List of museums in Switzerland
