= Kostis Velonis =

Greek sculptor

Kostis Velonis (born 1968) is a Greek sculptor. He is known for exploring the afterlives of unrealized Modernist and avant-garde projects. Many of Velonis' sculptures explore awkwardness and the slapstick, and he is particularly interested in "stumbling" as an important aesthetic and political category.

== Career ==
Velonis lives and works in Athens/Greece. Most recently, his work has been shown at Kunstverein in Hamburg (Hamburg, 2009), Museum of Contemporary Art (Athens, 2010), Witte de With Contemporary Art Center (Rotterdam, 2011), Palais de Tokyo (Paris, 2013), Museo Tamayo (Mexico City, 2014), Palais des Beaux Arts (BOZAR) (Brussels, 2014), Kunsthalle Athena (Athens, 2014), Whitechapel Gallery (London, 2015), Lothringer13 – Städtische Kunsthalle München (Munich, 2015), Padiglione d'Arte Contemporanea (Milano, 2015), Belvedere 21. Museum of Contemporary Art (Vienna, 2018), Cranbrook Art Museum (Michigan, 2019), Kunsthalle Osnabrück (Osnabrück, 2019), among other places.

== Education ==
Velonis holds an MRes in humanities and cultural studies from the London Consortium. He studied Esthétiques et Technologies des Arts at Université Paris 8 (D.E.A), and earned his PhD from the Department of Architecture, National Technical University of Athens.

== Institutional Support & Exhibitions ==
Velonis work has been supported by the MAK Center (Los Angeles, 2012), the Swedish Arts Council (Malmö, 2012), Casa Maauad (Mexico City, 2016), Akademie Schloss Solitude (Stuttgart, 2016), and the Seeger Center at Princeton University (2018). He has participated in multiple exhibitions, art fairs and residencies internationally.

Kostis Velonis was the NEON City Project 2017 commissioned artist. CITY PROJECT is an initiative for public art and the city, conceived and commissioned annually by NEON to a Greek artist. For this commission Velonis created A Puppet Sun, the largest individual presentation of his work until then. The exhibition mined the rich context of a historical neoclassical residence in the center of Athens, its political, social and cultural history that dates back to the end of 19th century, for narratives and symbols which Velonis both incorporates and invokes in his sculptural works. The exhibition was curated by Vassilis Oikonomopoulos, Assistant Curator, Collections International Art, Tate Modern, London.

== Work ==
According to a recent catalogue, "His work interrogates the ideological orientations of avant-garde movements during the 20th century, which saw art as a practice for social purposes." Velonis’ work reminds us of domestic spaces which were easily dismissed during the heyday of modernism, when it was considered a failed and outdated value system. Apart from historical connotations, the playful narrations and “awkward” craftsmanship of Velonis’ sculptures demythicize the “revolutionary” rhetoric and ideological taboos of contemporary “political art”. Velonis evokes contradictory ideas through the use of simple materials. His work explores the broader contexts around class identity and the beauty of the trivial. He engages concepts that encompass rather than isolate aesthetics and politics.

Velonis' work has been documented in a number of publications, including: ArtPulse Magazine, ArtForum, and ArtReview. According to art historian Daphne Vitale, Velonis "is considered one of the most important Greek artists of his generation."
