= Elisabeth Samsonov =

Austrian philosopher

Elisabeth von Samsonow is an Austrian artist and philosopher. She is the Professor for Philosophical and Historical Anthropology at the Kunst an der Akademie der bildenden Künste, Vienna. She is also a member of GEDOK Munich.

After she studied Philosophy and Theology at the Ludwig-Maximilians-Universität München she worked there from 1987 as a Professor for Renaissance-Philosophy, until 1991 where she was a professor at the University Vienna. Since 1996 she is a professor at the Akademie der bildenden Künste, Wien berufen.

== Publications ==
- Egon Schiele - Sanctus Franciscus Hystericus, Wien: Passagen Verlag 2012
- Egon Schiele - Ich bin die Vielen. Mit einem Nachwort von Peter Sloterdijk, Wien: Passagen Verlag 2010
- Anti-Elektra. Totemismus und Schizogamie, Zürich/Berlin: diaphanes, 2007, ISBN 3-935300-85-9
- Flusser Lectures. Was ist anorganischer Sex wirklich? Theorie und kurze Geschichte der hypnogenen Subjekte und Objekte, Köln: Buchhandlung Walther König, 2005
- Biographien des organlosen Körpers (Hg. mit Éric Alliez), Wien: Turia und Kant, 2003
- Sex-Politik (Hg. mit Doris Guth), Wien: Turia und Kant, 2001
- Chroma Drama. Widerstand der Farbe (Hg. mit Éric Alliez), Wien: Turia und Kant, 2001
- Fenster im Papier: Die imaginäre Kollision der Architektur mit der Schrift oder die Gedächtnisrevolution der Renaissance, München: Fink, 2001
- Telenoia. Kritik der virtuellen Bilder (Hg. mit Éric Alliez), Wien: Turia und Kant, 1999
- Hyperplastik. Kunst und Konzepte der Wahrnehmung in Zeiten der mental imagery (Hg. mit Éric Alliez), Wien: Turia und Kant, 1998
- Die Erzeugung des Sichtbaren. Die philosophische Begründung naturwissenschaftlicher Wahrheit bei Johannes Kepler, München: Fink, 1987
