= Gérard Raulet =

French philosopher

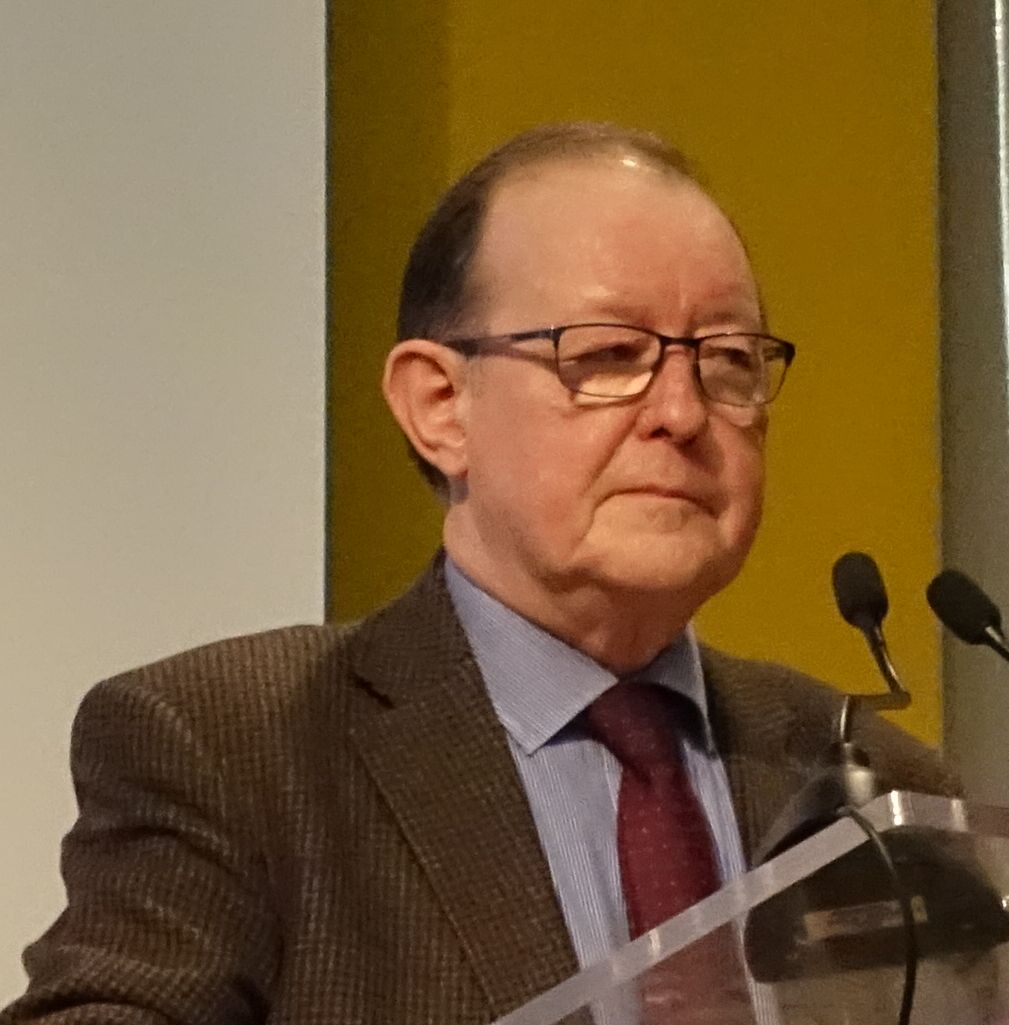
- Raulet in 2018
- Born: 9 August 1949 (age 77); Sceaux, Hauts-de-Seine

Education
- Education: Saint-Cloud École Normale Superieure

Gérard Raulet (born 9 August 1949) is a French philosopher, Germanist, and translator, specializing primarily in the thought of Herbert Marcuse and Ernst Bloch. He is a professor emeritus of German History and Thought at the Paris-Sorbonne University.

== Early life and education ==
Raulet was born 9 August 1949 in Sceaux, Hauts-de-Seine. Raulet studied at Saint-Cloud École Normale Superieure, graduating in 1969. Raulet then qualified as a German instructor in 1973, earned his PhD in 1981, and doctorat d'État in 1985.

== Career ==
A prolific author, Raulet has devoted several works to German philosophers such as Walter Benjamin, Max Scheler, Karl Marx. He is also the author of publications on the culture of Weimar and German political philosophy. He is the translator of the article by Jürgen Habermas called "The Enlightenment, an unfinished project" in response to the postmodernist criticism, on which Raulet himself worked.

Between 1975 and 1987, Raulet was first an instructor and then assistant professor at the Paris-Sorbonne University before joining the university of University of Rennes 2 as a professor in 1987. He then taught at the university of Paris-XII before joining the École normale supérieure de Lyon in 1997. Raulet taught at the École normale supérieure de Lyon until 2003, after which he rejoined the Paris-Sorbonne University where is currently a professor emeritus. From 1981 to 1999, he also oversaw the Weimar Cultural Study Group at the Maison des Sciences de l'Homme in Paris.

=== Herbert Marcuse ===
Raulet has written extensively on the subject of the Frankfurt School, with specific attention to Herbert Marcuse, the subject of his Herbert Marcuse: Philosophie de l'emancipation published in 1992. Raulet argues that the notion of emancipation is central to Marcuse's philosophy, as Marcuse sought to develop a third position between conceptions of utopian emancipation in Soviet Marxism and those of human nature latent in American capitalism. Philosopher Joseph Bien regarded the text as one of the most important works on Marcuse published in the late twentieth century, and Raulet as "one of France's more important, younger, social philosophers."

== Bibliography ==
Selected Articles in English

- "What Good is Schopenhauer? Remarks on Horkheimer's Pessimism." Telos, no. 42 (1979): 98-106. doi: 10.3817/1279042098
- "The Agony of Marxism and the Victory of the Left." Telos, no. 55 (1983): 163–178. doi: 10.3817/0383055163
- "Marxism and the post-modern condition." Telos, no. 67 (1986): 147–162. doi: 10.3817/0386067147
- "The new utopia: communication technologies." Telos, no. 87 (1991): 39–58. doi: 10.3817/0391087039
- "Legitimacy and globalization." Philosophy & Social Criticism 37, no. 3 (2011): 313–323. doi: 10.1177/0191453710389445

Books in English

- Critical Cosmology: On Nations and Globalization: a Philosophical Essay. Lexington books, 2005.
