= Pablo Reinoso =

Pablo Reinoso may refer to:

- Pablo Reinoso (footballer)
- Pablo Reinoso (designer)
