= Reinoso (surname) =

Reinoso is a surname. Notable people with the surname include:

- Alonso de Reinoso (1518–1567), Spanish Conquistador in Honduras, Mexico, Peru and Chile
- Antonio García Reinoso (1623–1677), Spanish painter
- Carlos Reinoso (born 1945), Chilean footballer and current manager of Mexican club Veracruz
- Didier Reinoso (born 2007), Cuban footballer
- Diego de Arce y Reinoso (1587–1665), Spanish bishop
- Fortunato Moreno Reinoso, Mexican artisan from Ixmiquilpan
- Gerardo Reinoso (born 1965), Argentine footballer
- Jair Reinoso (born 1985), Colombian football striker
- Jorge Vinatea Reinoso (1900–1931), Peruvian painter and caricaturist
- José Francisco Reinoso (born 1950), Cuban footballer
- Lázaro Reinoso (born 1969), Cuban wrestler
- Pablo Reinoso (footballer) (born 1985), Chilean footballer
- Pablo Reinoso (designer) (born 1955), Argentine–French artist and designer
- Ricardo Gónzalez Reinoso (born 1965), Chilean footballer

See also

- Reinoso, is a municipality and town located in the province of Burgos, Castile and León, Spain
- Reinoso de Cerrato, is a municipality located in the province of Palencia, Castile and León, Spain
