= Nanqi =

Nanqi may refer to:

- Southern Qi (479–502), a dynasty in southern China during the Northern and Southern Dynasties period
- Nanqi Township (南奇乡), a township in Jingxiu District, Baoding, Hebei, China
- Nanqi Subdistrict (南七街道), a subdistrict in Shushan District, Hefei, Anhui, China

== See also ==
- Nan Qi (artist) (born 1960), Chinese artist
