= Guillaume Bottazzi =

French artist

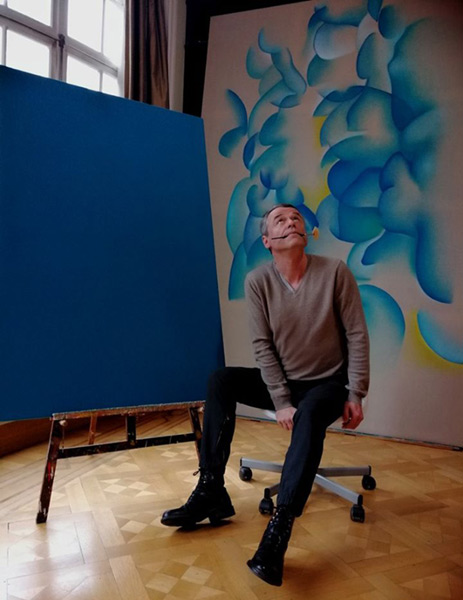
Guillaume Bottazzi in 2020

Guillaume Bottazzi (born in 1971) is a French visual artist.

== Biography ==
Guillaume Bottazzi is a French visual artist, born in 1971. At the age of 17, he decided to become an artist as a single activity. He began to study painting in Italy. Back in France, winner of a competition, he moved into an artist studio given by French Minister of Culture. Soon he imposed himself on the art. Pioneer of neuroesthetic stream, Guillaume Bottazzi has signed more than one hundred artworks in public space. It forms part of an overall consideration, including various contextual elements. He has received orders from different foreign museums, for example from Mori Art Museum.

He exhibited regularly in galleries and museums in several countries in Europe, Asia, USA, including New York City, where he settled in the 2000s. In New-York, his artworks have been shown by the Goldstrom gallery and the White Cube’s Annex Gallery. In 2004, Guillaume Bottazzi moved to Japan. It was both a culture shock and a new source of inspiration for him. In 2010, at the initiative of Tokyo Metropolitan Government, Tokyo Metropolitan Foundation of History and Culture, the National Art Center, Tokyo, Suntory Museum of Art, Tokyo Midtown, Mori Building and Mori Art Museum, Guillaume Bottazzi created an artwork of 3 m high and 33 m wide at Roppongi Hills, in the center of Tokyo.

Another project, realized in 2011, can be seen in Sapporo, Japan, on the facades of the Miyanomori Art Museum, MIMAS, a work of 900 m², a jewel of Contemporary Art in Hokkaido. An exhibition of Guillaume Bottazzi’s work was organized at the same time.

In 2012, following the selection of the Mori Art Museum, Mori building has commissioned art works from French artist Guillaume Bottazzi. They are incorporated into the new high-rise building Ark Hills Sengokuyama: at heart of the rejuvenated Toranomon district in Tokyo.

Still in Japan, Guillaume Bottazzi is represented by the Gallery Itsutsuji, a mayor gallery in Tokyo. Gallery Itsutsuji is well known to have introduced Supports/Surfaces artists like Claude Viallat, Daniel Dezeuze, Jean-Pierre Pincemin and other artists like Simon Hantaï and Pierre Soulages. His paintings are also exhibited in Artiscope Gallery, a mayor gallery in Belgium. This gallery introduced Arte Povera and from Transavantgarde. His works is part of different public collections as the Queen Shorough Collection and the William Whipple Collection in the United States or as the MIMAS, Miyanomori International Museum of Art Miyanomori Art Museum in Japan.

In 2015, a Guillaume Bottazzi's 216 m² painting became part of the artistic path of La Défense in Paris. The greatest artists, from Alexander Calder to Richard Serra, including Joan Miró, have made their mark on the La Défense district. In 2016, Guillaume Bottazzi was invited to participate to the "Le French May" event, organized by the Consulate General of France in Hong Kong and Macau. This 565 square meters'exhibition took place in Hong Kong Central Library and 23 recent paintings have been shown. Between 2016 and 2017, in Brussels, with the city and the European Commission, he created a painting 16 metres high that now forms part of the heritage of Brussels-Capital.

== Artworks ==
In Guillaume Bottazzi's works, diffuse light reflects other spaces beyond their confines, notably through successive transparent, glazed (Glaze (painting technique)) layers of painting. The loose shapes appear to be freed of the laws of weightlessness. Areas disappear into the medium, an integral part of the work, giving an impression of infinity, forming impalpable elements and ethereal shapes. Light is found within space that is uncertain, an impression that is strengthened by the abstract nature of his works. His paintings give an impression of strangeness. His works leads us, the public, to change with them, stimulating our cognitive skills and forcing us to develop our own creative perception. A study that was carried out by scientists Helmut Leder and Marcos Nadal from the University of Vienna proves that Guillaume Bottazzi’s art reduces anxiety in the people who look at it.

== Artworks in public space ==
Coordinated	Location	réalisation	Image	Size
43°17′09″N 5°22′35″E	Marseille – Enamels, three-metre high	2022		3 m^{2} (32 sq ft)
48°47′12″N 2°25′35″E	Grand Paris – Oil on canvas, ten-metre long, Alfortville	2022		10 m^{2} (110 sq ft)
50°43′50″N 3°19′03″E	Hauts-de-France – Enamels, three-metre high glass sculpture, Croix	2021		3 m^{2} (32 sq ft)
48°51′59″N 2°26′20″E	Grand Paris - Emaux, Georges Méliès student residence, Montreuil	2021		12 m^{2} (130 sq ft)
43°32′45″N 6°56′19″E	Côte d'Azur - Enamels, Mandelieu-la-Napoule, to discover during the European Heritage Days	2020		3 m^{2} (32 sq ft)
48°56′06″N 2°33′57″E	Ile-de-France - Enamels, to discover during the European Heritage Days	2020		2 m^{2} (22 sq ft)
45°44′54″N 4°50′20″E	Lyon - Backlit artwork, to discover during the European Heritage Days	2020		2 m^{2} (22 sq ft)
50°36′44″N 3°07′52″E	Enamels, 3.20 meters x 1.10 in Lille, France	2019		3.52 m^{2} (37.9 sq ft)
43°17′25″N 5°22′08″E	Oil on raw linen, 3.00 meters x 0.90 in Marseille, France	2019		2.7 m^{2} (29 sq ft)
45°47′06″N 4°48′36″E	Enamels on glas, 3.55 meters x 1.20 in Lyon, France	2019		4 m^{2} (43 sq ft)
43°24′20″N 5°03′06″E	10 meters x 8 meters'painting in Martigues, France	2018		80 m^{2} (860 sq ft)
50°50′12″N 4°22′53″E	16 meters x 7 meters'painting in Place Jourdan, Brussels, Belgium	2017		112 m^{2} (1,210 sq ft)
43°16′20″N 5°23′16″E	Mural painting, Marseille, France	2017		20 m^{2} (220 sq ft)
	Backlit artworks, Brussels	2016		30 m^{2} (320 sq ft)
48°53′25″N 2°14′52″E	Paris La Défense, artistic path of La Défense	2014		216 m^{2} (2,330 sq ft)
43°11′45″N 5°37′03″E	La Ciotat in the context of "Marseille Provence 2013, European Capital of Culture"	2013		50 m^{2} (540 sq ft)
48°50′57″N 2°18′10″E	Paris - Oil on raw linen, to discover during the European Heritage Days	2012		3 m^{2} (32 sq ft)
	Tokyo Organized by: Tokyo Metropolitan Government, Tokyo Metropolitan Foundation of History and Culture, the National Art Center, Tokyo, Suntory Museum of Art, Tokyo Midtown, Mori Building and Mori Art Museum.	2012		99 m^{2} (1,070 sq ft)
43°03′26″N 141°18′09″E	Miyanomori Art Museum, Sapporo	2011 / 2012		900 m^{2} (9,700 sq ft)
43°42′20″N 7°15′34″E	Nice	2011		200 m^{2} (2,200 sq ft)
45°46′05″N 4°52′48″E	Villeurbanne	2010		16 m^{2} (170 sq ft)

== Gallery ==
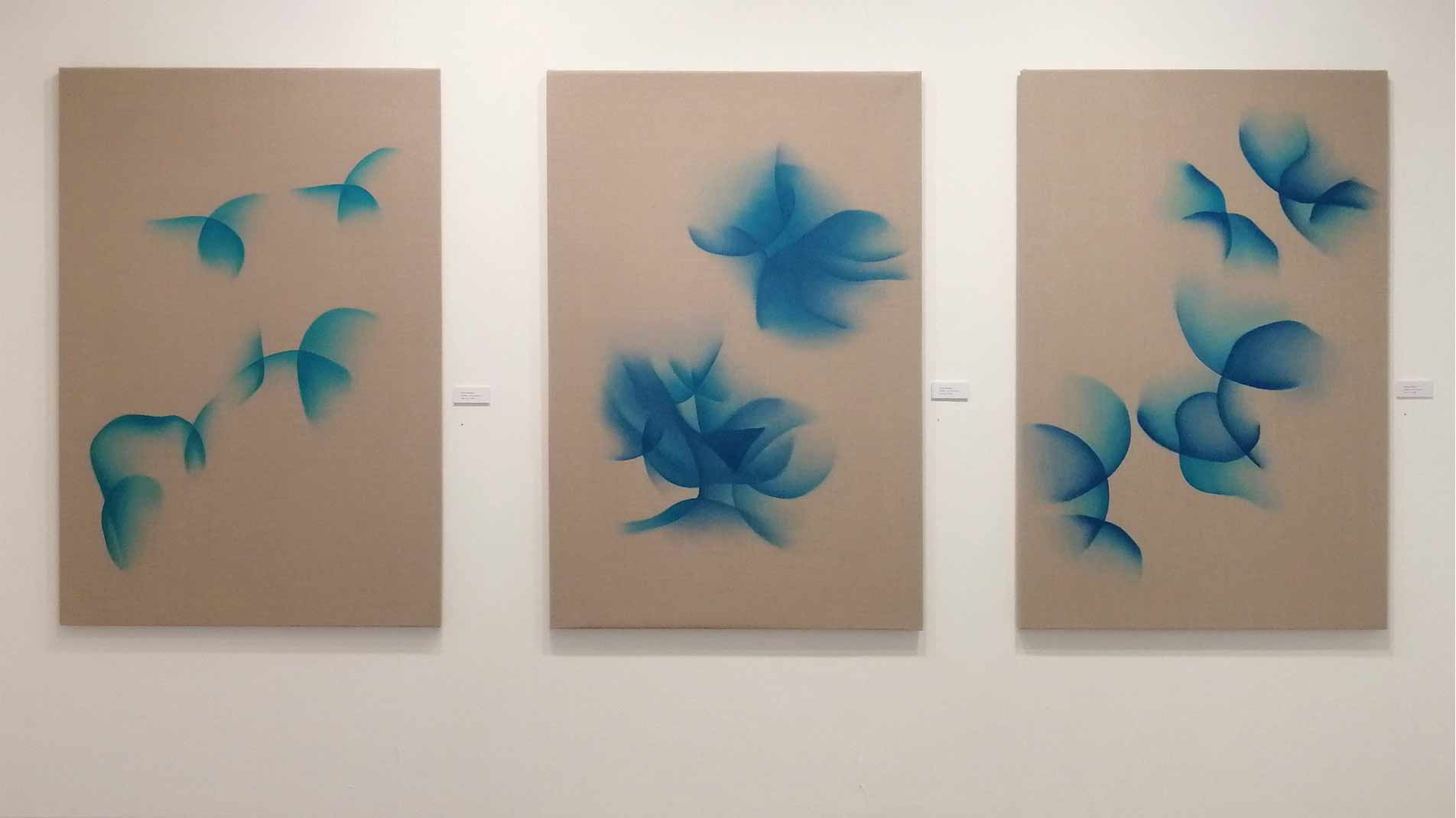

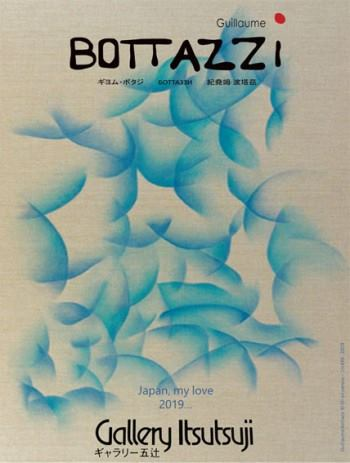

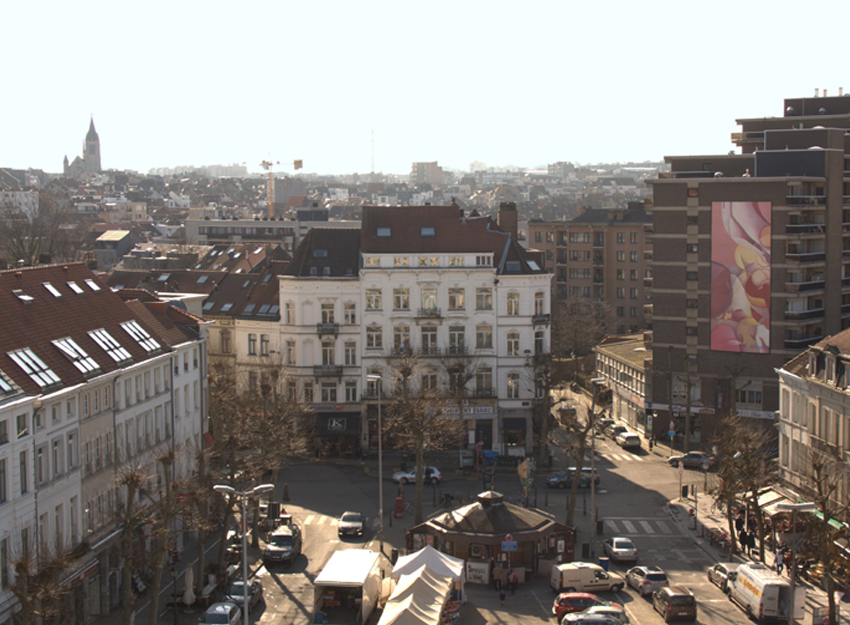

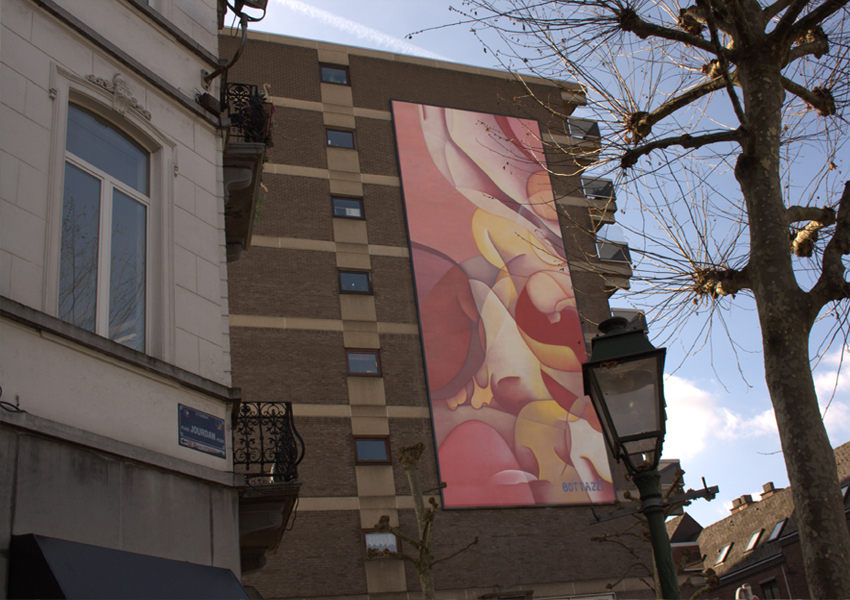

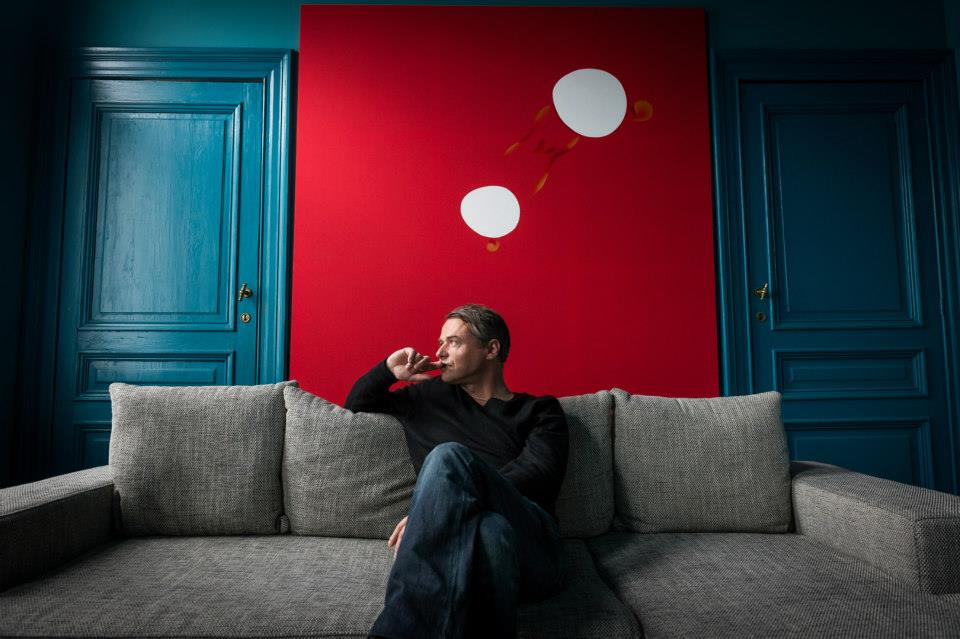

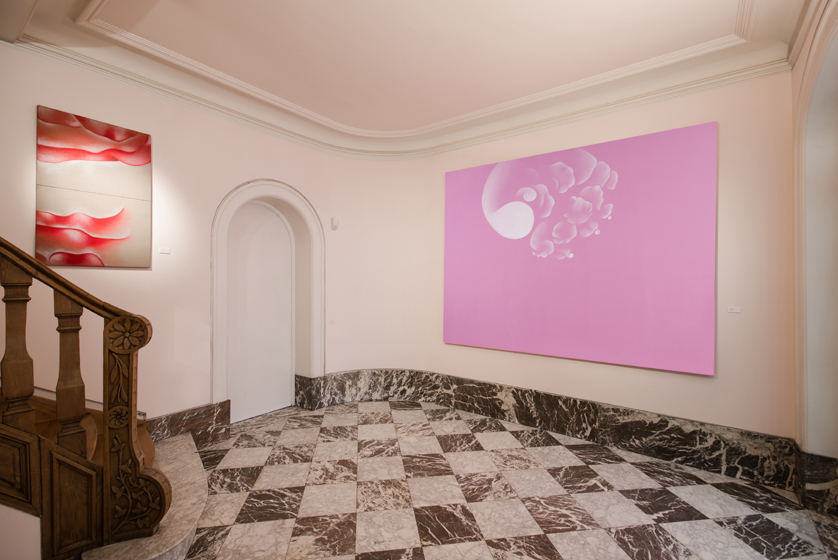

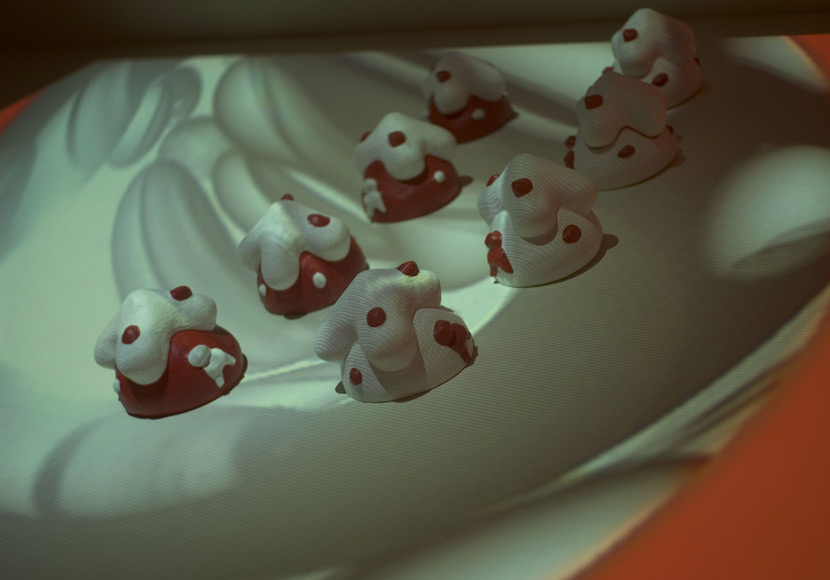

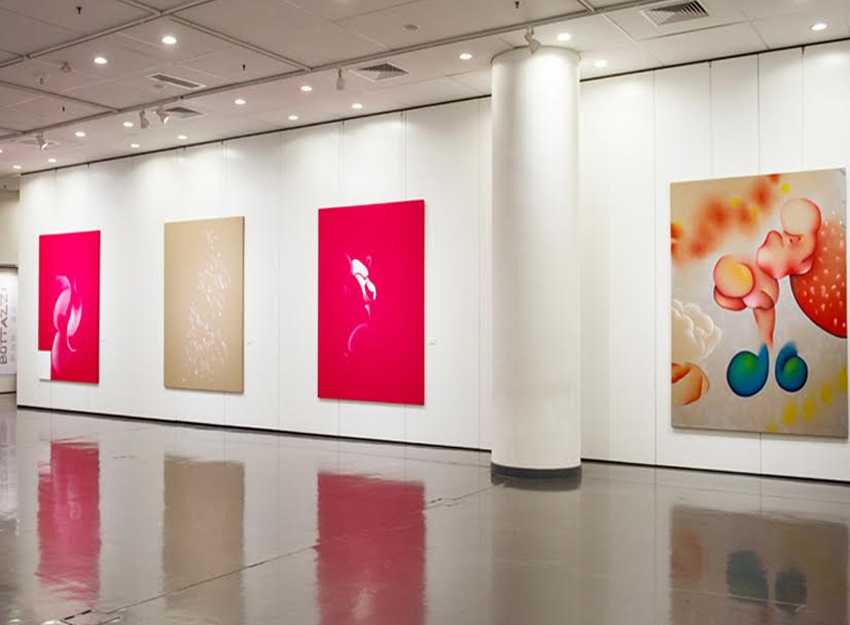

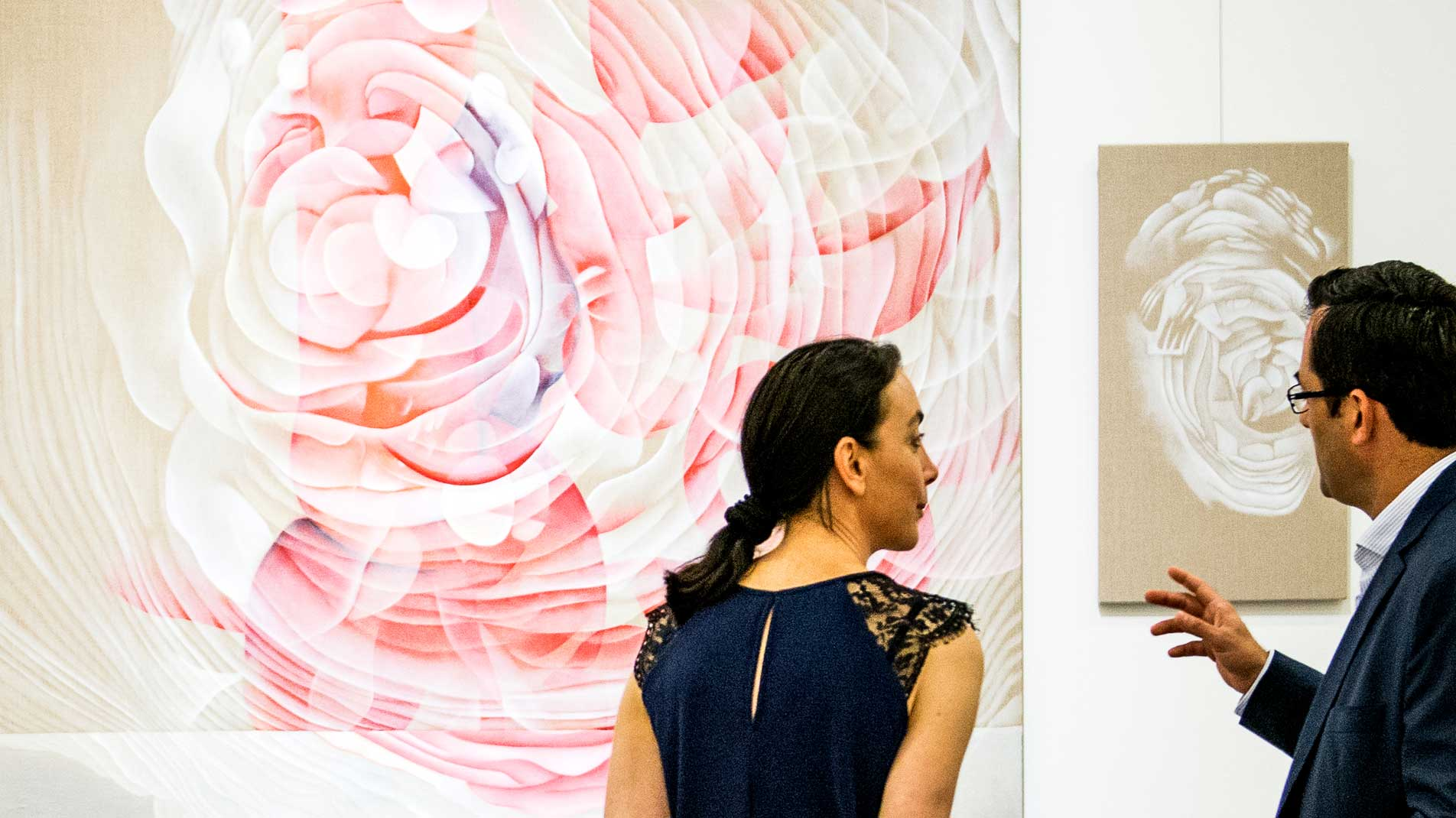

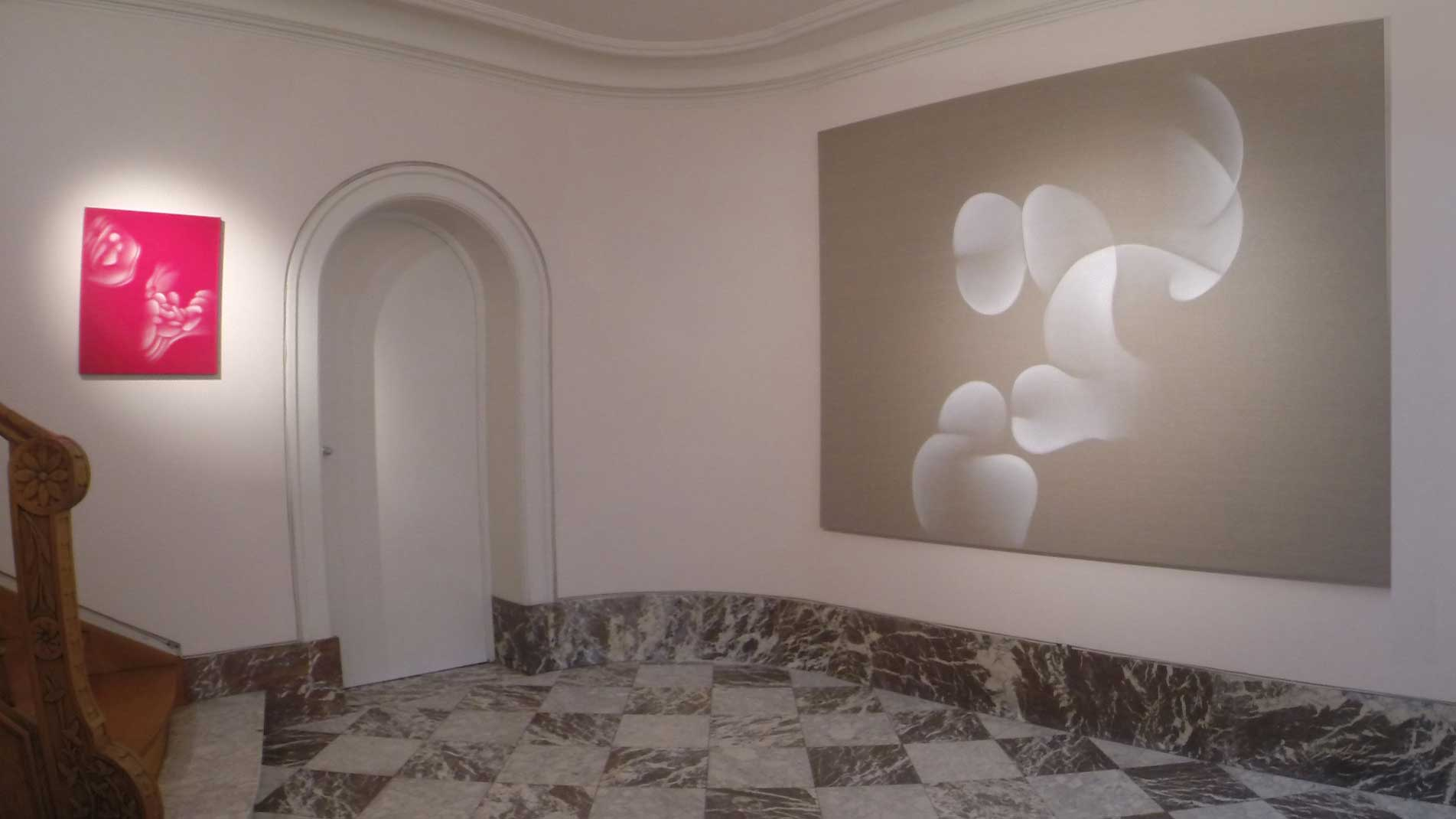

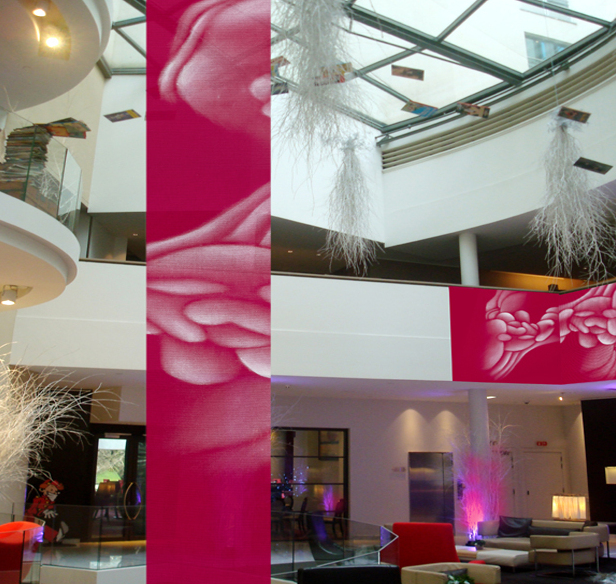

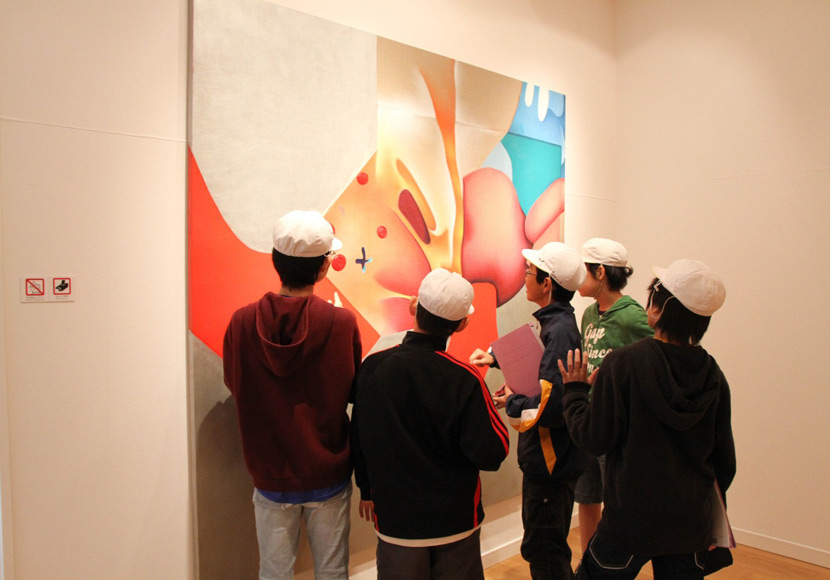

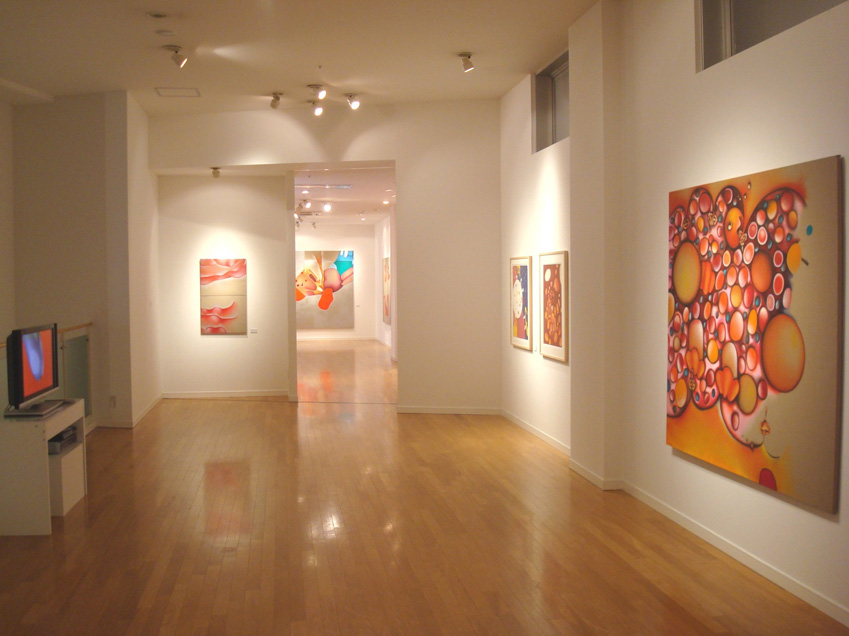

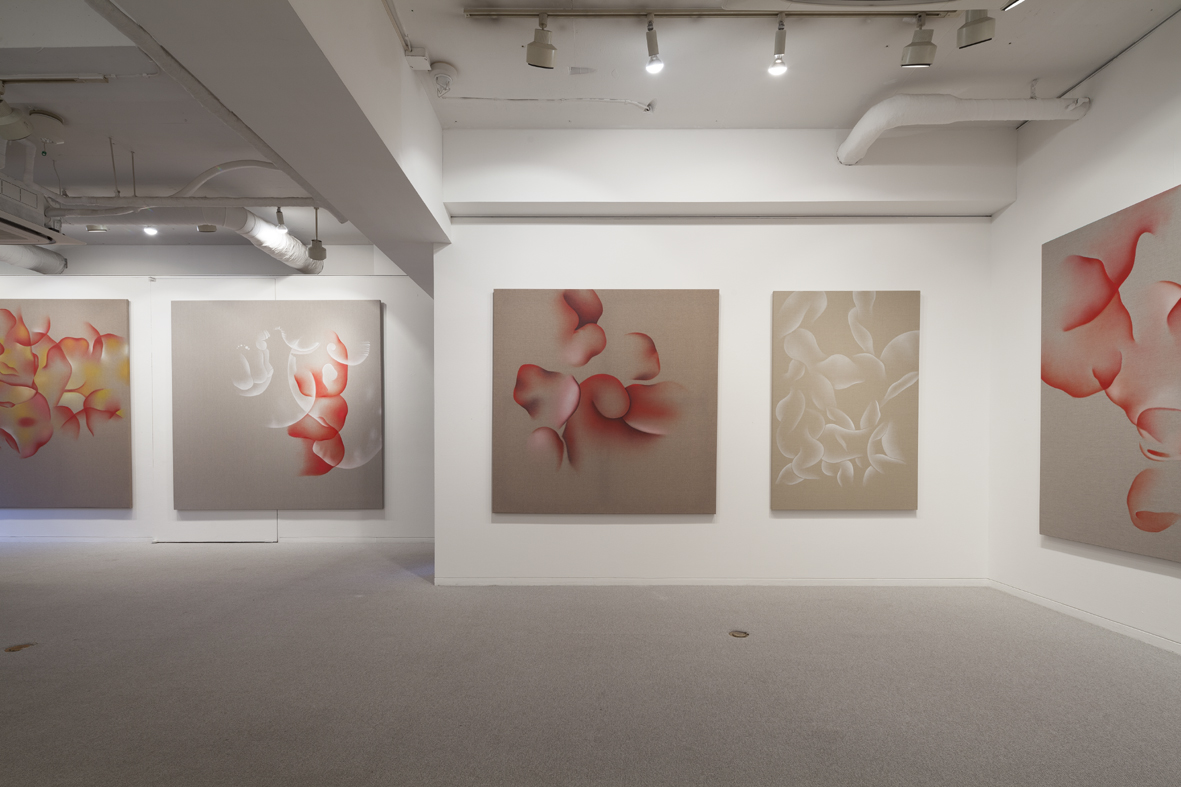

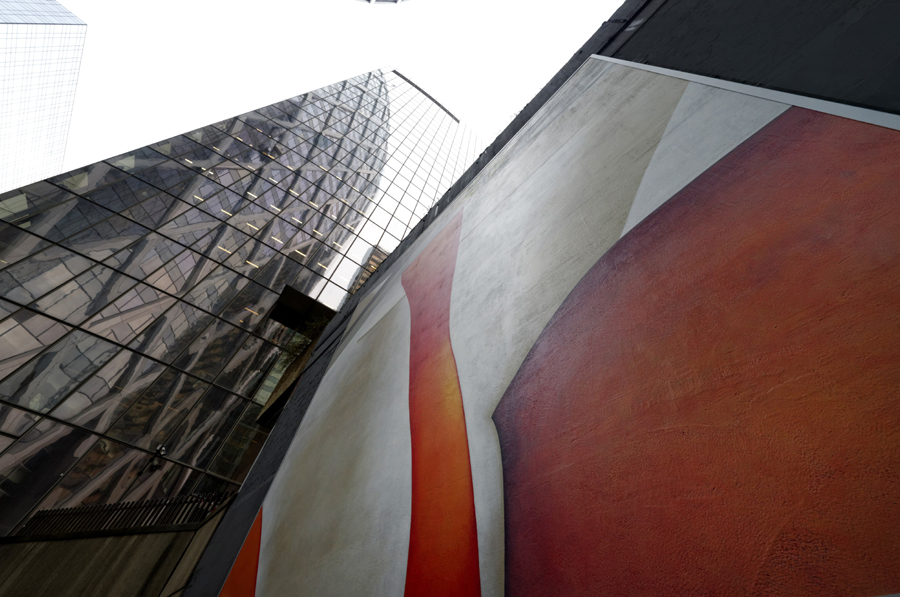

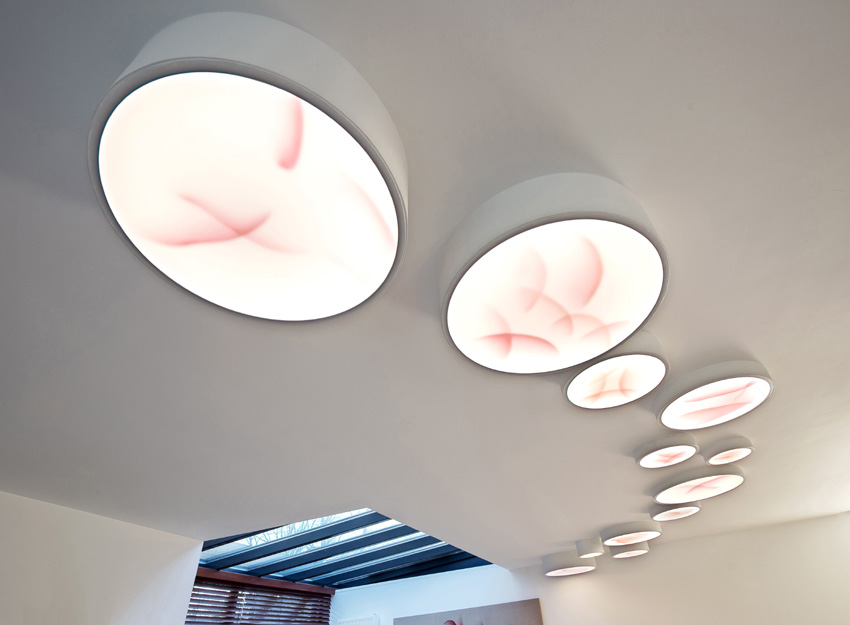
