= Market Arcade, Newport =

Victorian arcade in Newport, Wales

Market Arcade
- Arcdêd y Farchnad
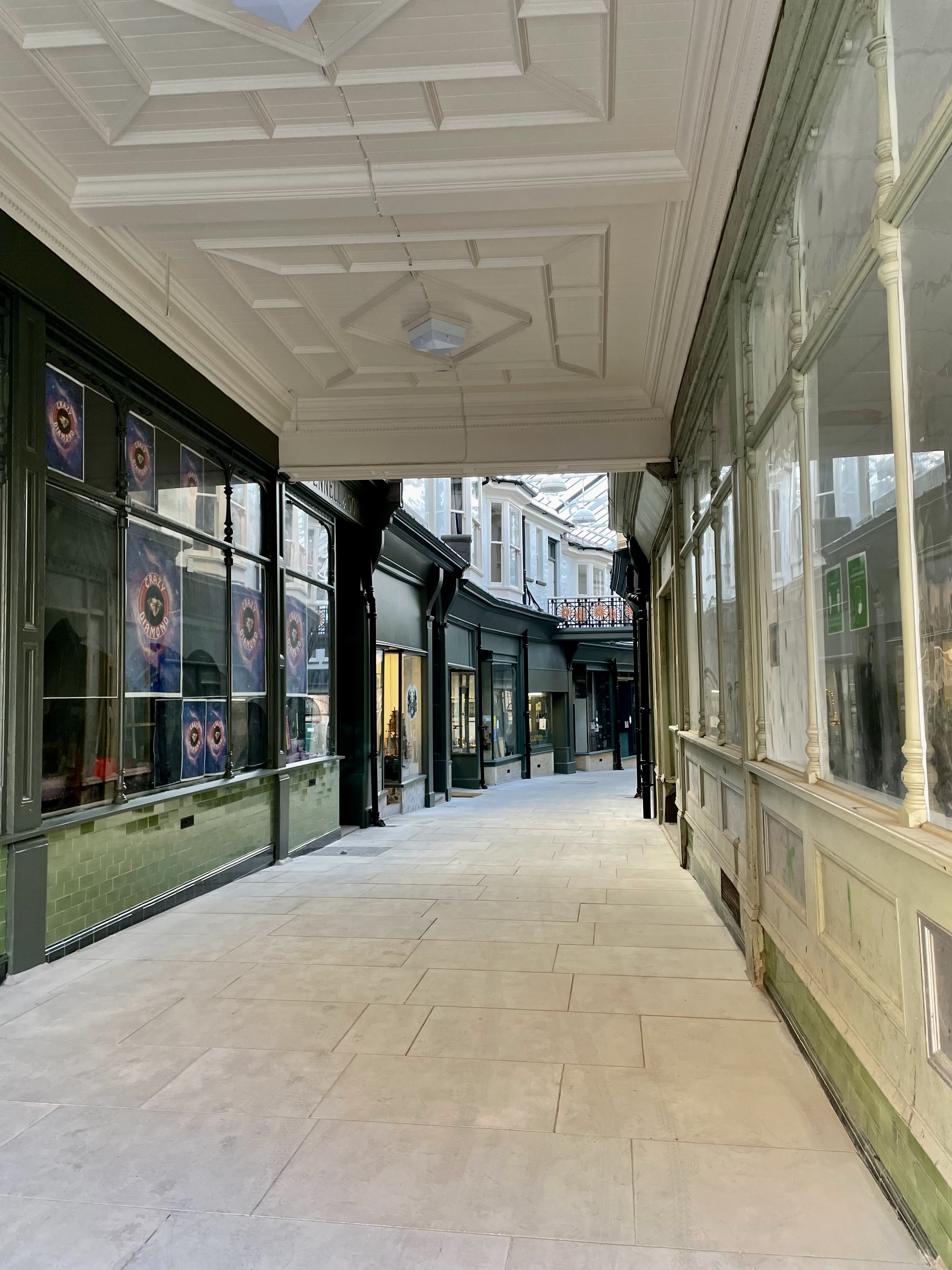
- The High Street entrance to the Arcade, shown post-renovation
- Interactive map of the Market Arcade area
- Former names: Fennell's Arcade; Flower Arcade

General information
- Status: Renovated (2022)
- Type: Arcade
- Architectural style: Victorian
- Classification: Grade II listed building
- Location: Newport city centre, Market Arcade, NP20 1FS, Newport, Wales
- Coordinates: 51.58943°N 2.996657°W
- Opened: 1869; 157 years ago
- Renovated: 1905; 121 years ago 2022
- Renovation cost: £1.1 million

Renovating team
- Architect: Davies Sutton Architects
- Renovating firm: Anthony A. Davies Ltd

Other information
- Public transit: Newport railway station

Website
- Market Arcade site

Market Arcade (Welsh: Arcdêd y Farchnad) is a city centre Victorian shopping arcade in Newport, Wales. It also serves as a pedestrian route between High Street and Newport Market.

It is the second oldest Victorian arcade still in operation in Wales, the oldest in Newport, and one of the oldest in the UK.

== History ==
The Arcade opened in 1869 when it opened as Fennell's Arcade. It became known as Flowers Arcade in the early 20th century, reflecting the businesses that were present. In the 2000s, prior to renovation, the arcade was unlit, in structural decline, and it was the site of regular anti-social behaviour and damage. In November 2020 a public space protection order was put in place to enable police to restrict access at certain times, and issue fines of up to £1,000.

== Renovation ==
Newport City Council obtained National Lottery Heritage funding in 2018 for a £1.1 million renovation of the Arcade. The project was awarded to contractors Anthony A Davies and heritage architects Davies Sutton. The renovation was affected by the COVID-19 outbreak which pushed back work by contractors Anthony A. Davies until June 2020. It began a phased reopening throughout 2021, first with weekday openings and European Heritage Days tours taking place for local schools and community groups. Exterior scaffolding was removed in December 2021 and a completion date was set for January 2022.

== Occupants ==
The Arcade consists of a number of freeholds with separate owners. A number of buildings are leased to occupiers. It is currently set to open as a mix of offices, co-working spaces, and traditional retail units.

== Gallery ==
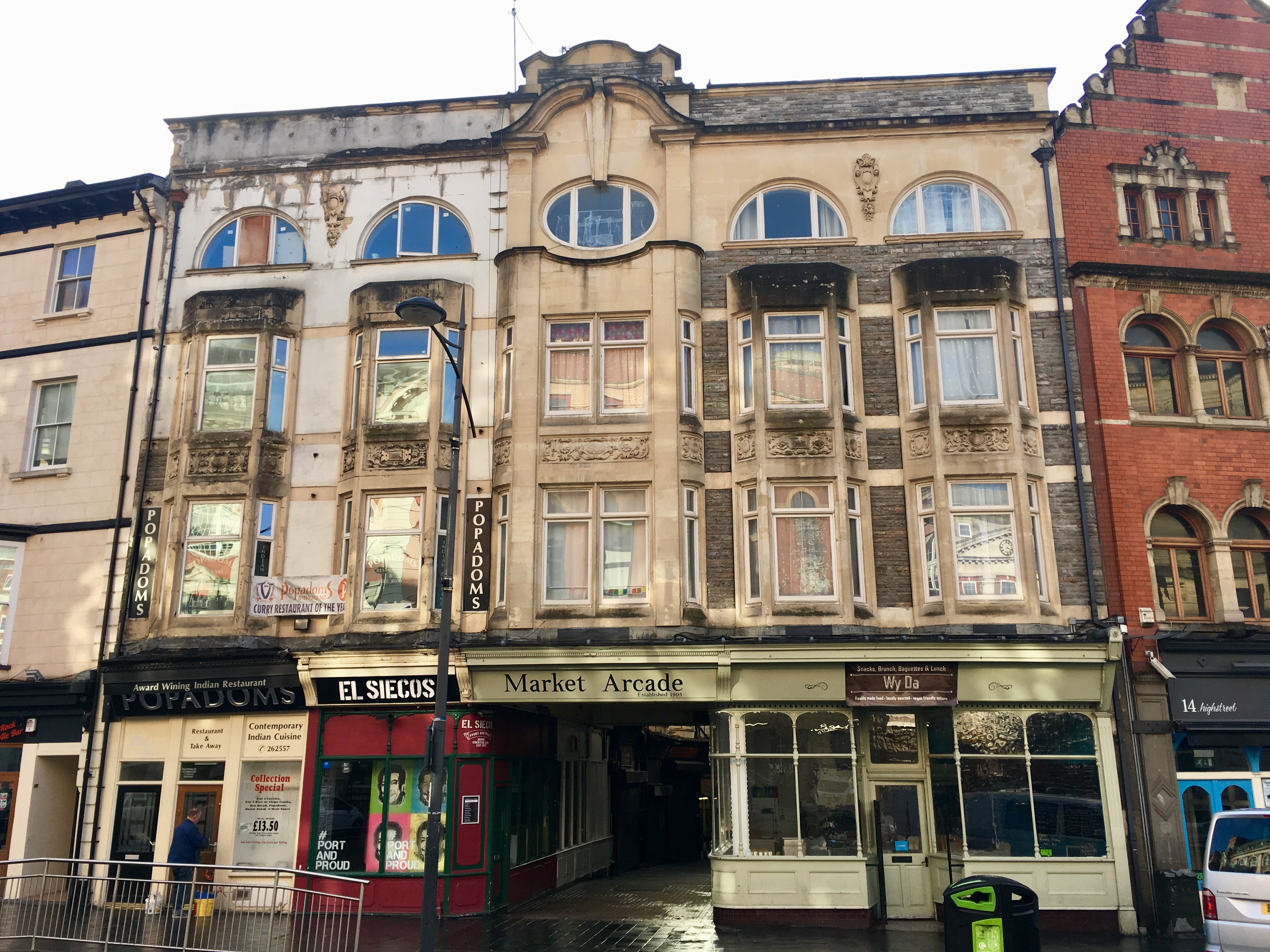
Market Arcade, including entrance blocks in Market Street & High Street

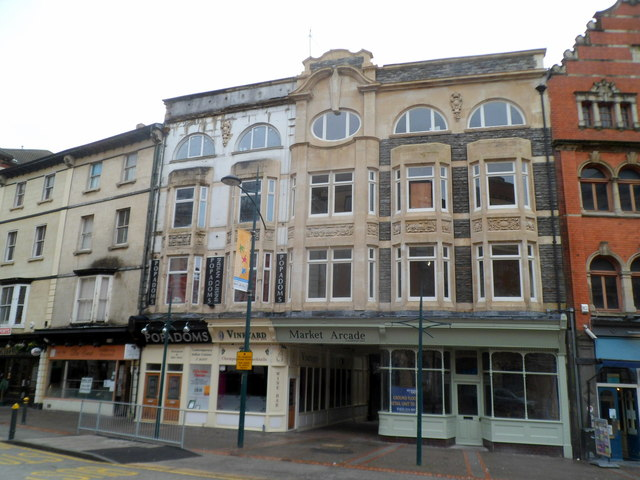
Northern entrance to Market Arcade, Newport

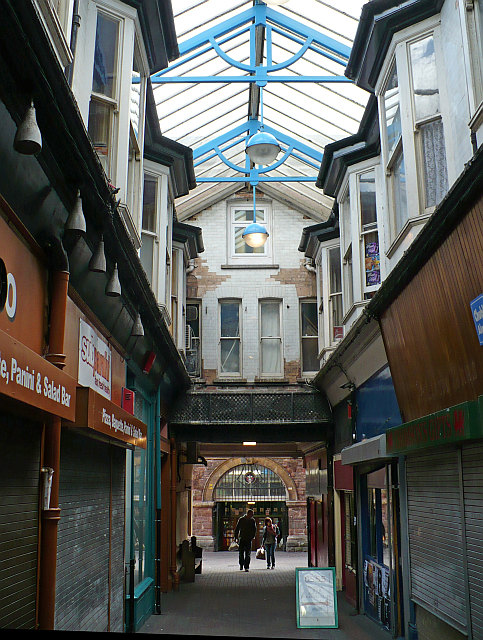
Market Arcade looking towards a side entrance of Newport Indoor Market

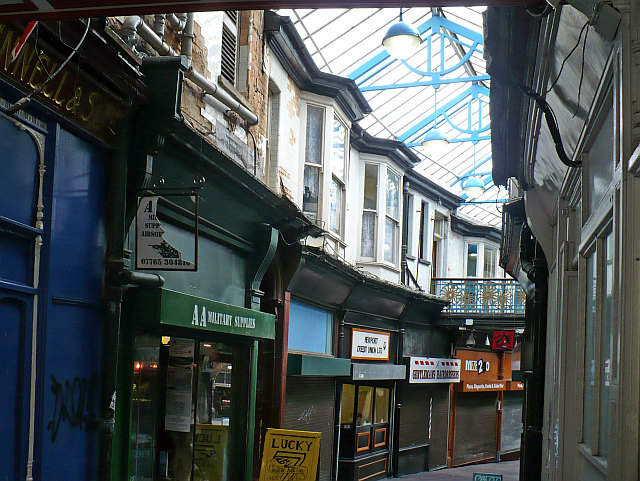
Market Arcade in a run down condition

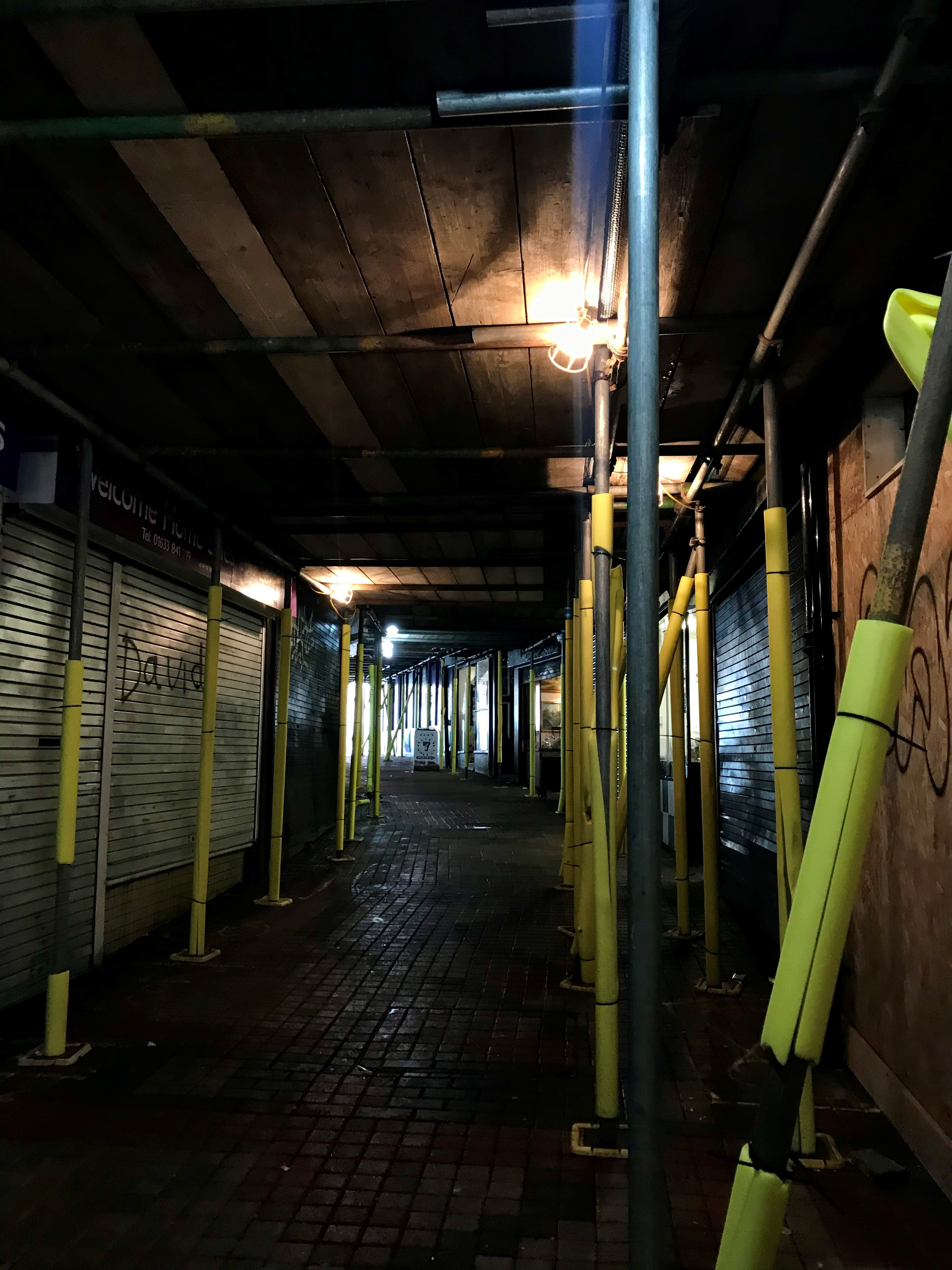
Market Arcade in 2020, when renovation was halted due to the COVID-19 pandemic

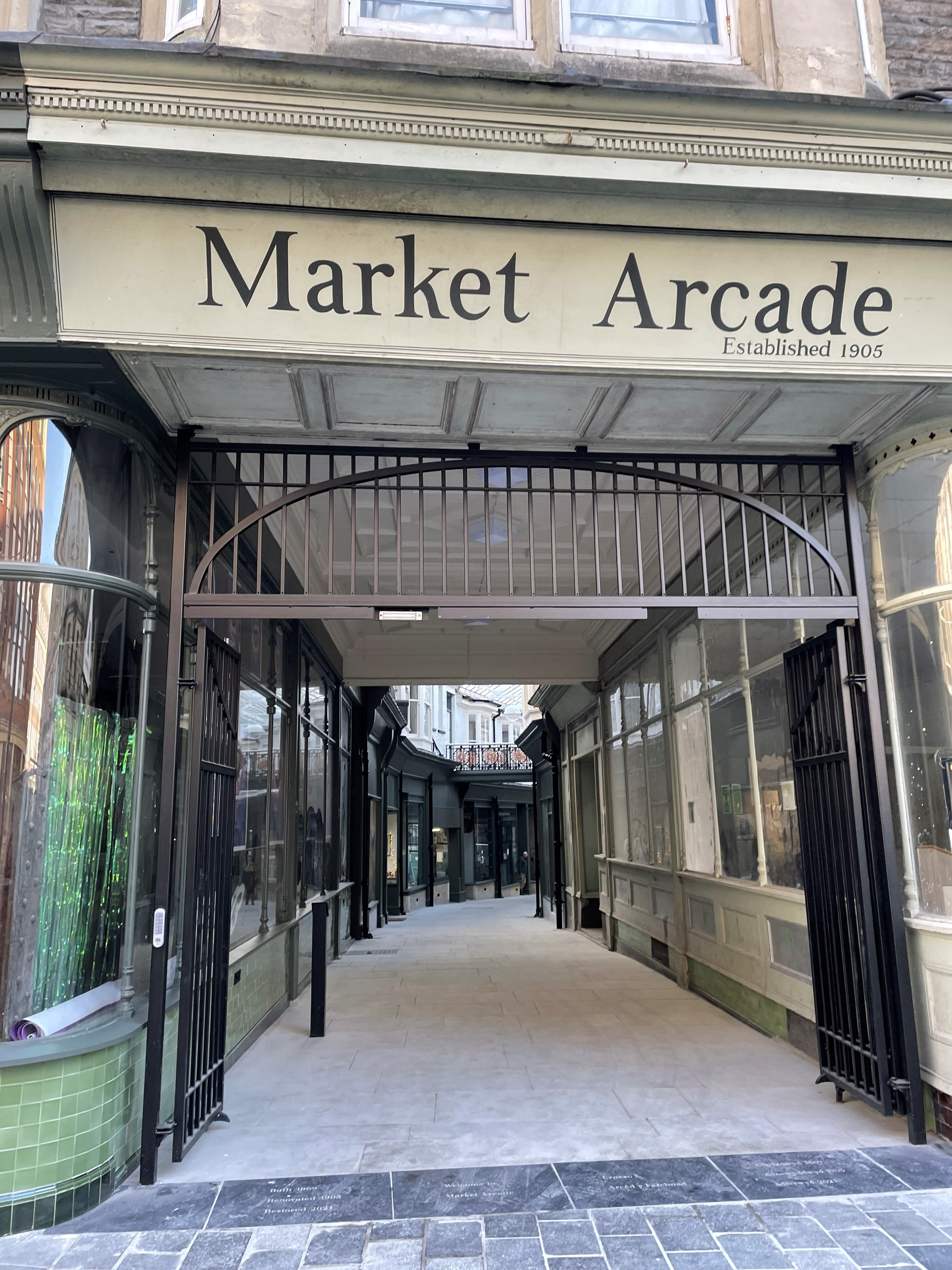
The signage adorning the High Street side entrance in 2022

== See also ==
- Newport city centre
- Newport Market
