= Tatsuo Miyajima =

Japanese artist (born 1957)

- Born: January 16, 1957; Edogawa City, Tokyo, Japan
- Known for: Visual art, conceptual art

Tatsuo Miyajima (宮島 達男, Miyajima Tatsuo; January 16, 1957 –) is a Japanese sculptor and installation artist who lives in Moriya, in Ibaraki prefecture, Japan. His work frequently consists of digital LED counters, and is primarily concerned with the function and significance of time and space, especially within the context of Buddhist influences .

== Early life ==
Miyajima was born in Edogawa City, Tokyo, on January 16, 1957. He graduated from the Oil Painting course in the Fine Arts department of Tokyo National University of Fine Arts and Music in 1984, and completed his MA at the same university in 1986.

== Work ==
Tatsuo Miyajima, C.T.C.S. Tricolore No. 8, 2010, LED, IC, electric wire, mirror, stainless steel, 6.73 x 13.62 x 1.57 inches (17.09 x 34.59 x 3.99 centimeters)

Although Miyajima originally trained as a painter, and briefly considered himself to be a performance artist, the majority of his work now takes the form of installation and sculpture. He has admitted that, in effect, his work now "performs" on his behalf. His core artistic concepts are: "Keep Changing, Connect with Everything, Continue Forever."

=== Early work ===
In 1970s, Miyajima practised performance art. He was initially influenced by the work of Joseph Beuys, Allan Krapow and Christo, and considered his performance work as an "action for society". The desire to create more enduring work - in contrast to the necessarily ephemeral nature of his performance and actions - motivated him to begin working on sculpture and installations.

=== LED works ===
Miyajima made his first LED counter in 1988; this has formed the basis for much of his later work. Typically, a block will display two digits in red or green, and count from 1 to 9. The counters never register zero, because, for Miyajima, the idea of zero is a purely Western concept. He has subsequently linked together different displays so that they can respond to each other; he calls these systems 'regions'.

== Kaki Tree Project ==
On the 9th of August, 1945, an atomic bomb was dropped in Nagasaki. Tens of thousands of people died suffering from the intense blast and heat, and the city of Nagasaki was reduced to ashes. However, there was a kaki tree which miraculously survived while more than half of the trunk was burnt black, and barely standing and about to die at any moment. In 1994, Masayuki Ebinuma, an arborist, started to treat the fragile tree and restored its health as to be able to produce “seedlings” from the bombed tree. Then Ebinuma started to hand out the “saplings” from the survivor tree to children who visited Nagasaki as a symbol of peace. After Miyajima learned Ebinuma's activity, he wanted to support Ebinuma as an artist. So then he displayed the saplings and recruited foster parents at an art exhibition in 1995. They received ten applications and selected the former Ryuhoku Elementary School in Taito-ku, Tokyo as a planting site. Through the process, Miyajima had conceived an art project called “Revive Time: Kaki Tree Project” and launched the executive committee. In 1996, the first planting of the project took place at the former Ryuhoku Elementary School. Miyajima himself conducted a workshop at the tree-planting ceremony. The counters in some of his works, he has explained, represent the lives of anonymous individuals.

== Exhibitions ==
Miyajima's first solo exhibitions include "Human Stone" at Gallery Parergon, Tokyo in 1983, and "Time" at Maki Gallery, Tokyo in 1986. More recently he has shown at Modern Art Museum of Fort Worth (1996), Fondation Cartier pour l'Art Contemporain (1996), San Francisco Museum of Modern Art (1997), Miyanomori Art Museum, Hokkaido (2010), and Ullens Center for Contemporary Art, Beijing (2011).

He has exhibited as part of numerous group exhibitions, notably the Venice Biennale in 1988 and 1999, as well Hiroshima City Museum of Contemporary Art (2008), and Museum of Contemporary Art, Sydney (2012) and the Third Asia-Pacific Triennial of Contemporary Art, Queensland Art Gallery, Brisbane (1999)

In 2020, Miyajima's works will be featured in STARS: Six Contemporary Artists from Japan to the World exhibition in Tokyo. In this exhibition will feature a new work, "Sea of Time – TOHOKU" alongside documentary footage of members of the public helping to set the counter speeds.

== Collections ==
The following museums and institutions have works by Miyajima in their collection:

- National Museum of Modern Art, Kyoto, Japan
- Hara Museum of Contemporary Art, Tokyo, Japan
- Museum of Modern Art, Shiga, Japan
- Nagoya City Art Museum, Nagoya, Japan
- Museum of Contemporary Art, Tokyo, Japan
- FARET Tachikawa, Tokyo, Japan
- TV Asahi building, Tokyo, Japan
- Tokyo Opera City, Tokyo, Japan
- Chiba City Museum, Chiba, Japan
- Group Home Sala in Florence Village, Akita, Japan
- The Museum of Modern Art, Saitama, Japan
- Contemporary Art Museum, Kumamoto, Japan
- Toyota Municipal Museum of Art, Aichi, Japan
- Saitama Prefectural University, Saitama, Japan
- Izumi City Plaza, Osaka, Japan
- Naoshima Contemporary Art Museum, Kagawa, Japan
- Iwaki City Art Museum, Fukushima, Japan
- Hiroshima City Museum of Contemporary Art, Hiroshima, Japan
- M+ Museum, Hong Kong
- Taipei Fine Arts Museum, Taiwan
- Samsung Cultural Foundation, Seoul, Korea
- Leeum, Samsung Museum, Seoul, Korea
- Chinese Telecom, Taipei, China
- Tate Gallery, London, UK
- Deste Foundation for Contemporary Art, Athens, Greece
- Fondation Cartier pour l'art contemporain, Paris, France
- Kunstmuseum Bern, Bern, Switzerland
- Université de Genève, Switzerland
- La Caixa, Barcelona, Spain
- Staatsgalerie Moderner Kunst, Munich, Germany
- Galerie der Stadt Stuttgart, Germany
- Fondazione TESECO per l'Arte, Pisa, Italy
- Chateau La Coste, Aix-en-Provence, France
- Modern Art Museum of Fort Worth, Texas, U.S.A.
- San Francisco Museum of Modern Art, San Francisco, U.S.A.
- Museum of Contemporary Art, Chicago, U.S.A.
- Dallas Museum of Art, U.S.A.
- Denver Art Museum, Denver, U.S.A.
- Dannheisser Foundation, New York, U.S.A.
- National Gallery of Canada, Ottawa, Canada
- Oakville Galleries, Oakville, Canada
- Australian Museum, Sydney, Australia
