= Deutsche Stiftung Denkmalschutz =

Cultural heritage foundation in Germany

- Abbreviation: DSD
- Established: 17 April 1985 (40 years ago)
- Founded at: Cologne
- Types: charitable corporation, nonprofit organization
- Legal status: German foundation under civil law
- Aim: preservation of cultural heritage in Germany
- Headquarters: Bonn
- Country: Germany
- Revenue: 53,373,272 euro (2020)
- Total Assets: 183,387,962 euro (2018)
- Employees: 180 (2020)
- Volunteers: 500 (2021)
- Awards: DZI Seal-of-Approval

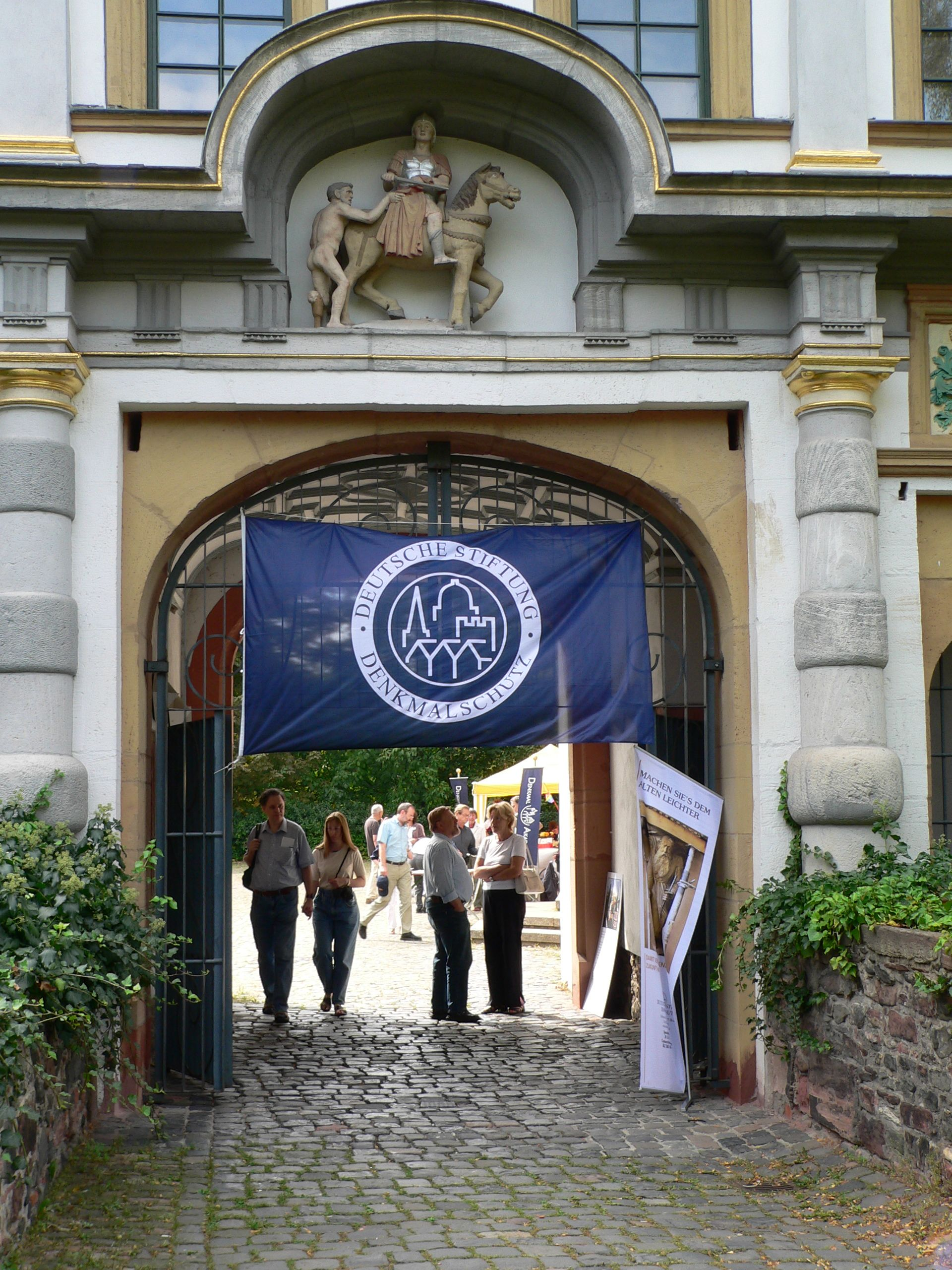
Tag des offenen Denkmals in the Höchster Schloß, 2006

The Deutsche Stiftung Denkmalschutz ("German Foundation for Monument Protection") is a German private initiative founded in 1985 that works for the preservation of cultural heritage in Germany and to promote the idea of cultural heritage management.

== Background ==
Since 1900, when Georg Dehio published his Handbook of German Art Heritage, Germany has not had a central list of National Heritage Sites. Each of the sixteen states keeps its own set of lists and many towns and cities keep their own lists, all based on varying criteria for inclusion.

== Monument protection ==
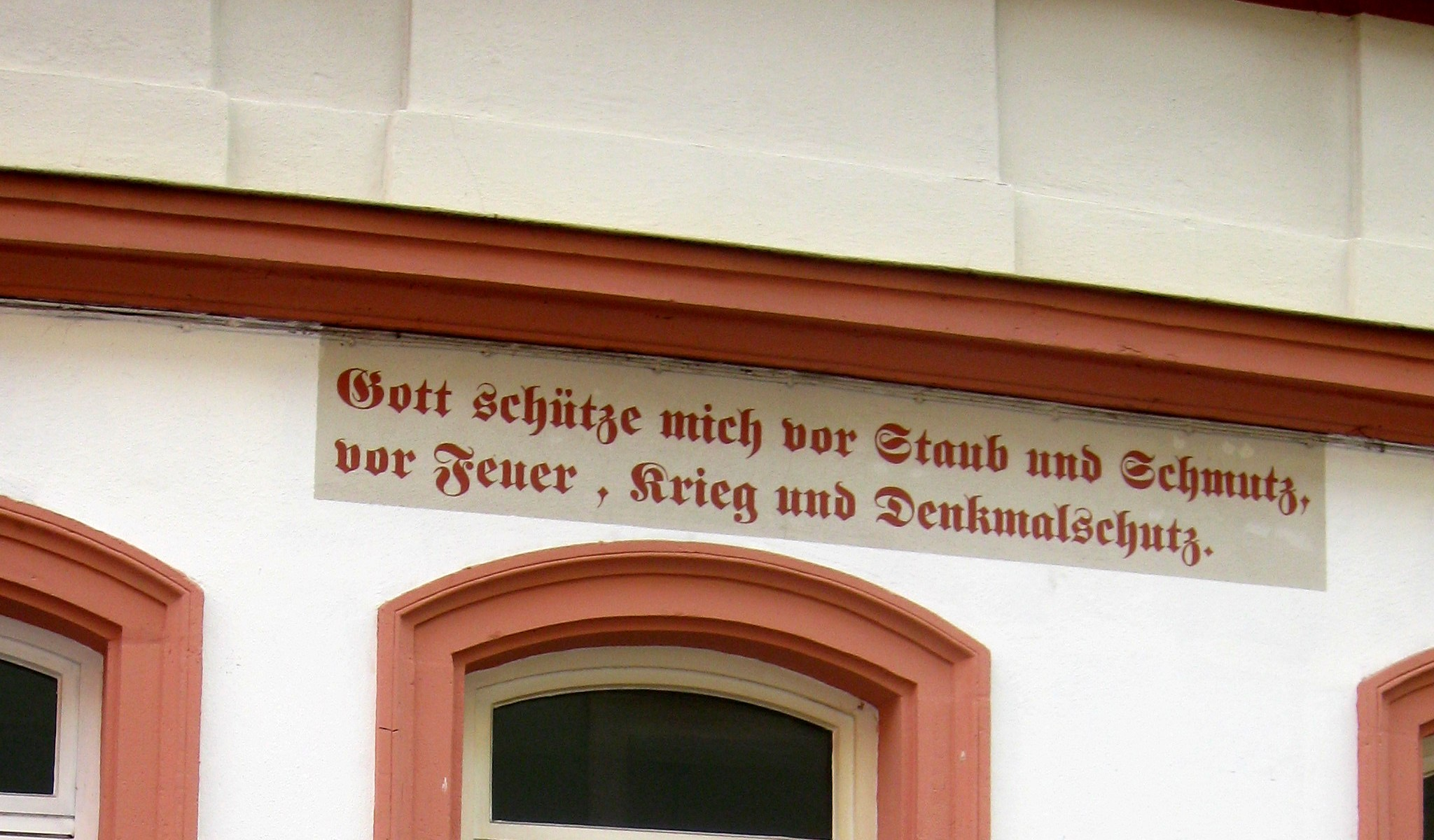
"God save me from dust and dirt, from fire, war, and the Denkmalschutz" on a building in Bamberg

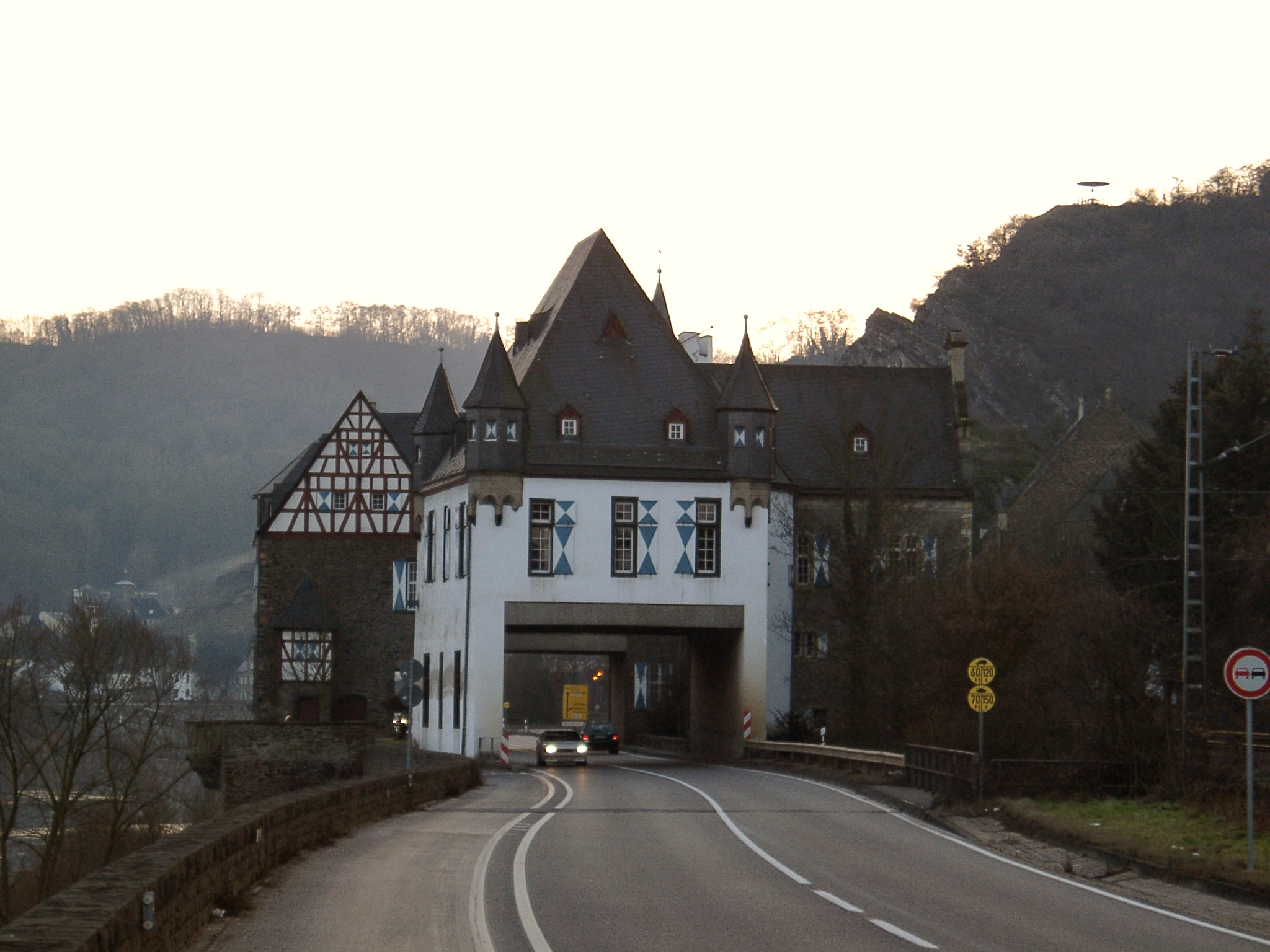
Compromise between conservation of a Heritage Site and economic needs such as a highway, Schloss Gondorf, Kobern-Gondorf, on the Moselle.

Denkmalschutz works to coordinate efforts, promote public awareness, and also to act as a central contact for worldwide organizations such as UNESCO World Heritage. They also organize and fund the European Heritage Days in Germany, which are called Tag des offenen Denkmals. This "open monument day" has been held yearly with a different theme since 1993 on the second Sunday of September. For example, in 2011 on September 11, the theme Romanticism, Realism, Revolution - The 19th Century opened in Trier.

Protecting heritage site homes with a listing in a regional Denkmalschutz list is not always appreciated by everyone, since such a listing may come with legal historic preservation obligations. Other protected sites such as cobblestone streets can be seen as a nuisance for cyclists and wheelchairs. Many sites are marked with a tag according to the Hague Convention of 1954 regarding the protection of cultural heritage in times of armed conflict.

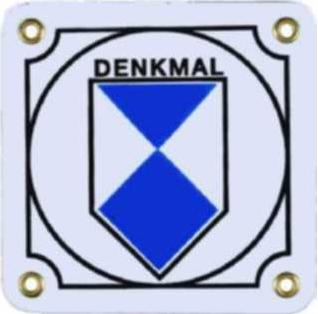
Denkmal plaque marker for buildings in various states, incorporating the symbol of the Hague Convention of 1954.

Denkmal plaque in North Rhine-Westphalia
