= Tag des offenen Denkmals =

Historical preservation event in Germany

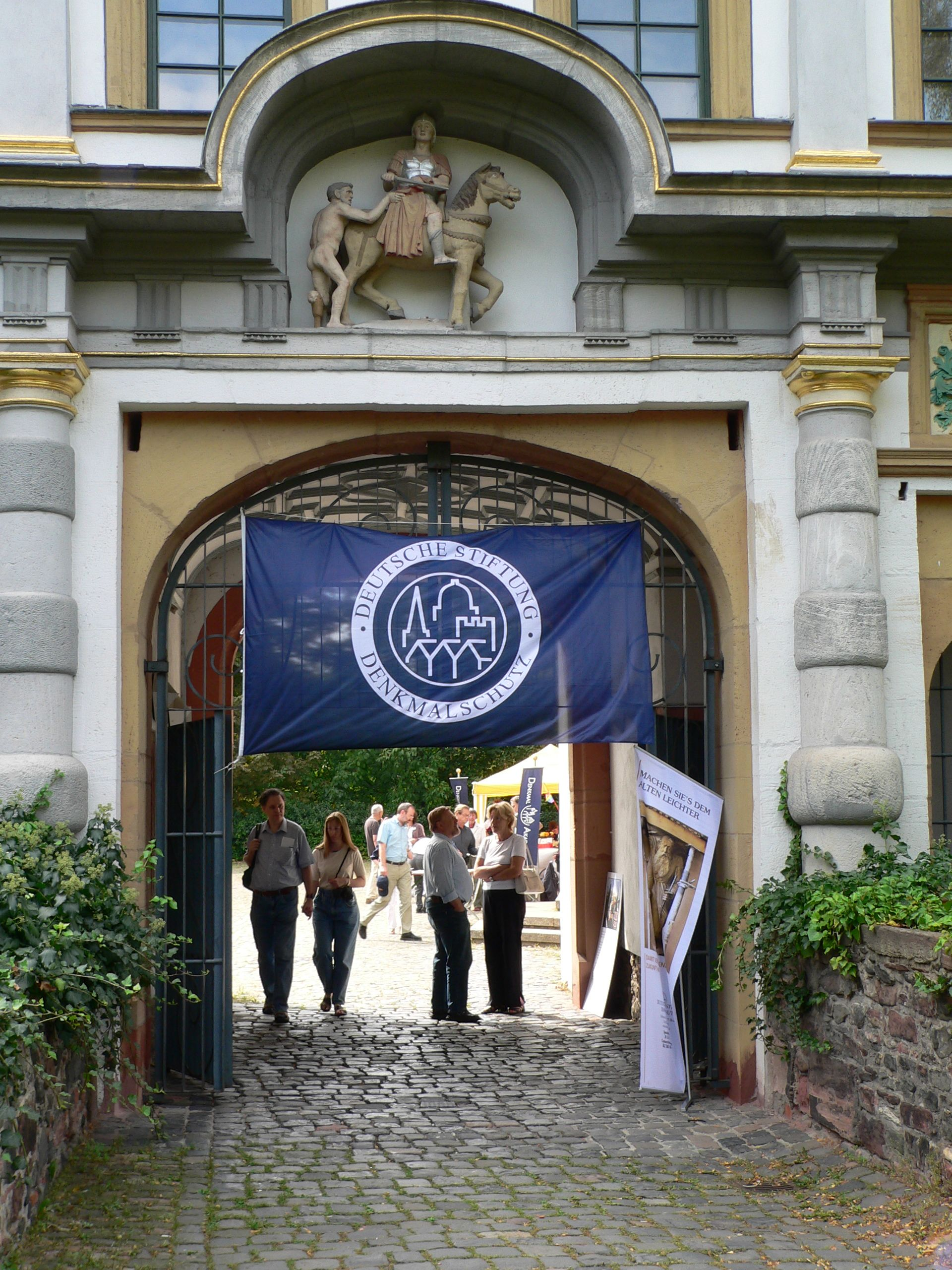
- Tag des offenen Denkmals 2006 in Höchster Schloß, Frankfurt
- Genre: Historic preservation
- Begins: Second Sunday in September
- Frequency: annual
- Location: many locations in Germany
- Inaugurated: 1993; 33 years ago
- Patron: Deutsche Stiftung Denkmalschutz
- Member: European Heritage Days
- Website: www.tag-des-offenen-denkmals.de

The Tag des offenen Denkmals (Day of Open Monuments) is an annual event all over Germany. The day of action has been coordinated by the Deutsche Stiftung Denkmalschutz since 1993. Historic monuments are open to the public free of charge. It takes place on the second Sunday in September and attracts several million visitors each year. The largest cultural event in Germany is the contribution of the country to the European Heritage Days.

== Description ==
The aim of the day of action is to make the importance of the architectural heritage tangible. Organised by the Deutsche Stiftung Denkmalschutz, it is Germany's contribution to the European Heritage Days held throughout Europe. On the day, many monuments that are otherwise inaccessible are opened to the public, often with guided tours. Typically, around 7,000 monuments in more than 2,500 municipalities are open on the day.

== History ==
The idea of a heritage day originated in France. In 1984, the then Minister of Culture Jack Lang launched the Days of Open Doors in Historic Monuments (Journées Portes ouvertes dans les monuments historiques). Due to the great response, other countries followed in the next few years. In 1991, the Council of Europe took up these initiatives and officially founded the European Heritage Days.

In Germany, Gottfried Kiesow, then president of the Landesamt für Denkmalpflege Hessen, began in 1991 an action Tag der offenen Tür (Day of open door) in Hesse. The city of Halle (Saale) followed a year later. Kiesow was a founding member and then deputy president of the Deutsche Stiftung Denkmalschutz. He suggested, that the foundation adopt the cause and coordinate a nationwide day of the open monument. The first Tag des offenen Denkmals was held in 1993, modeled after the Dutch Open Monumentendagen. In the first year, 3500 monuments in 1200 municipalities were opened, and attracting 2 million visitors.

In 1998, an official opening of the German event took place in Quedlinburg. In 2006, the Tag des offenen Denkmals was awarded the distinction "Ausgezeichneter Ort" (Excellent place) of the campaign Deutschland – Land der Ideen (Germany – Land of Ideas). In 2013, around 4 million visitors were recorded.

In 2020, the event was held virtually for the first time due to the COVID-19 pandemic in Germany. Monuments from all over Germany were posted in more than 1200 contributions for virtual visitors.

== Program ==
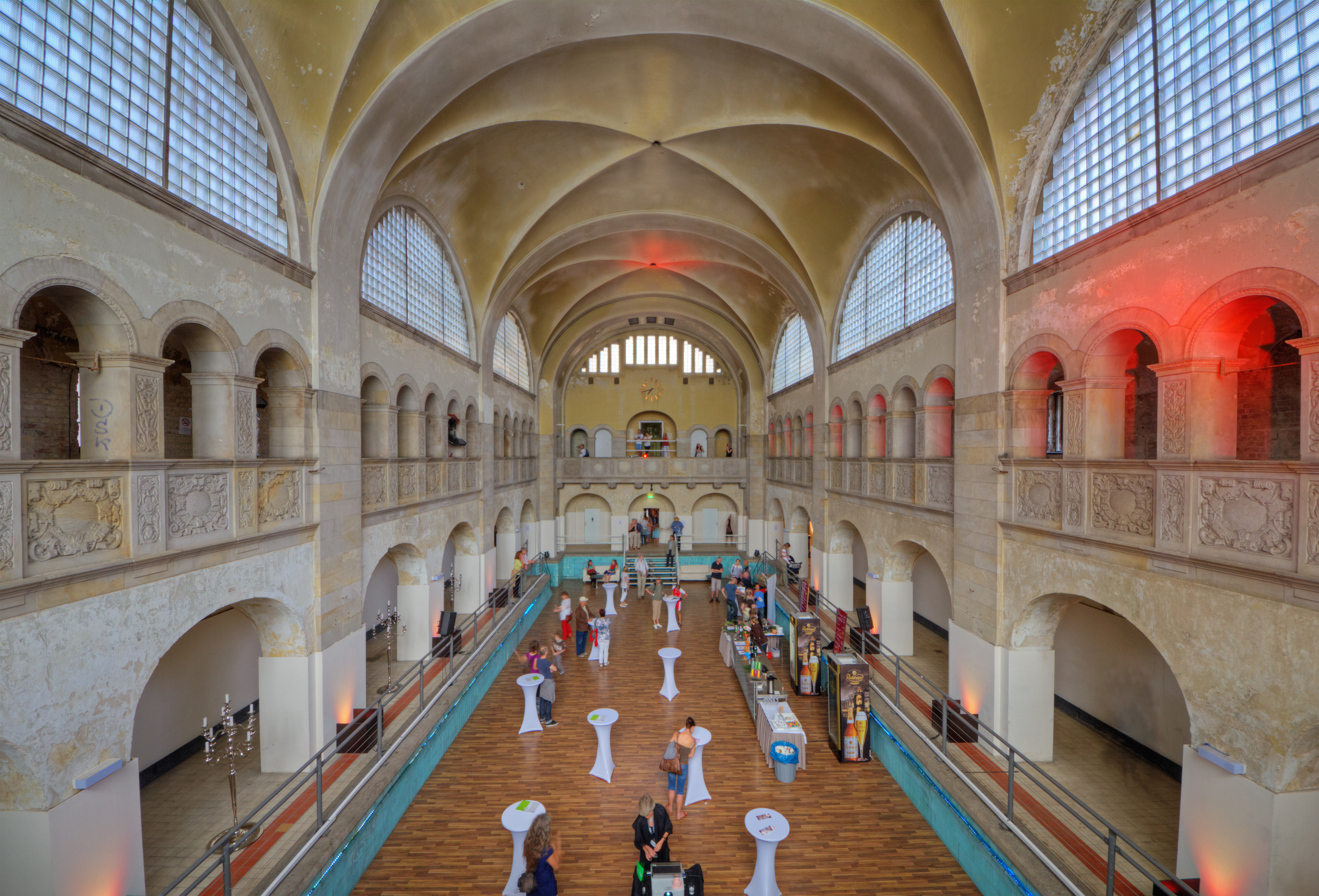
2012 Tag des offenen Denkmals in Stadtbad Oderberger Straße in Berlin

Each year, the action has a different motto, and is opened in a different city. It is supported by several thousand local initiatives and partners – from volunteers to the Landesdenkmalamt (Monument office). In addition to private monument owners, more than 2,600 municipalities participate. They can register their monument with the Deutsche Stiftung Denkmalschutz by 31 May each year. The visit to the monument on the day of action has to be free of charge. The program is published in August.

Until 2017, there was also the youth photo competition "Focus on Monument". Photographers up to age 20 could submit their photos corresponding to the year's motto. A jury of monument experts awarded prizes to the three best photos, each with prize money of 300 euros. Currently, there is the annual "Monument Snapshot" photo campaign.

== Mottos ==
Every year, the Deutsche Stiftung Denkmalschutz chooses a motto to focus on a specific aspect of heritage preservation:

- 1999: Europe – a common heritage
- 2000: Old Buildings – New Opportunities
- 2001: Monument as School – School as Monument
- 2002: A memorial rarely stands alone – streets, squares and ensembles
- 2003: History up close – living in a monument
- 2004: How's it going? – Focus on water
- 2005: War and Peace
- 2006: Lawns, Roses and Borders – Historic Gardens and Parks
- 2007: Places of contemplation and prayer – historical sacred buildings
- 2008: Past Uncovered – Archeology and Building Research
- 2009: Historical places of enjoyment
- 2010: Culture in Motion – Travel, Trade and Transport
- 2011: Romanticism, Realism, Revolution – The 19th Century
- 2012: Wood
- 2013: Beyond the good and the beautiful: Inconvenient monuments?
- 2014: Color
- 2015: Craft, Technology, Industry
- 2016: Preserving monuments together
- 2017: Power and Splendor
- 2018: Discover what connects us
- 2019: Modern: Upheavals in art and architecture
- 2020: Chance Monument: Remember. Obtain. Rethink. (virtual presentation)
- 2021: To be and appear – in history, architecture and monument preservation
- 2022: "A case for preservation of monuments ("Ein Fall für den Denkmalschutz")
- 2023: "Talent Monument"

== Associated commemorative day ==
From 2021, the Deutscher Orgeltag (German Organ Day) will take place at the same time as the Tag des offenen Denkmals (Open Monument Day).

== See also ==
- Doors Open Days
