= National Heritage Week =

Annual cultural event in Ireland

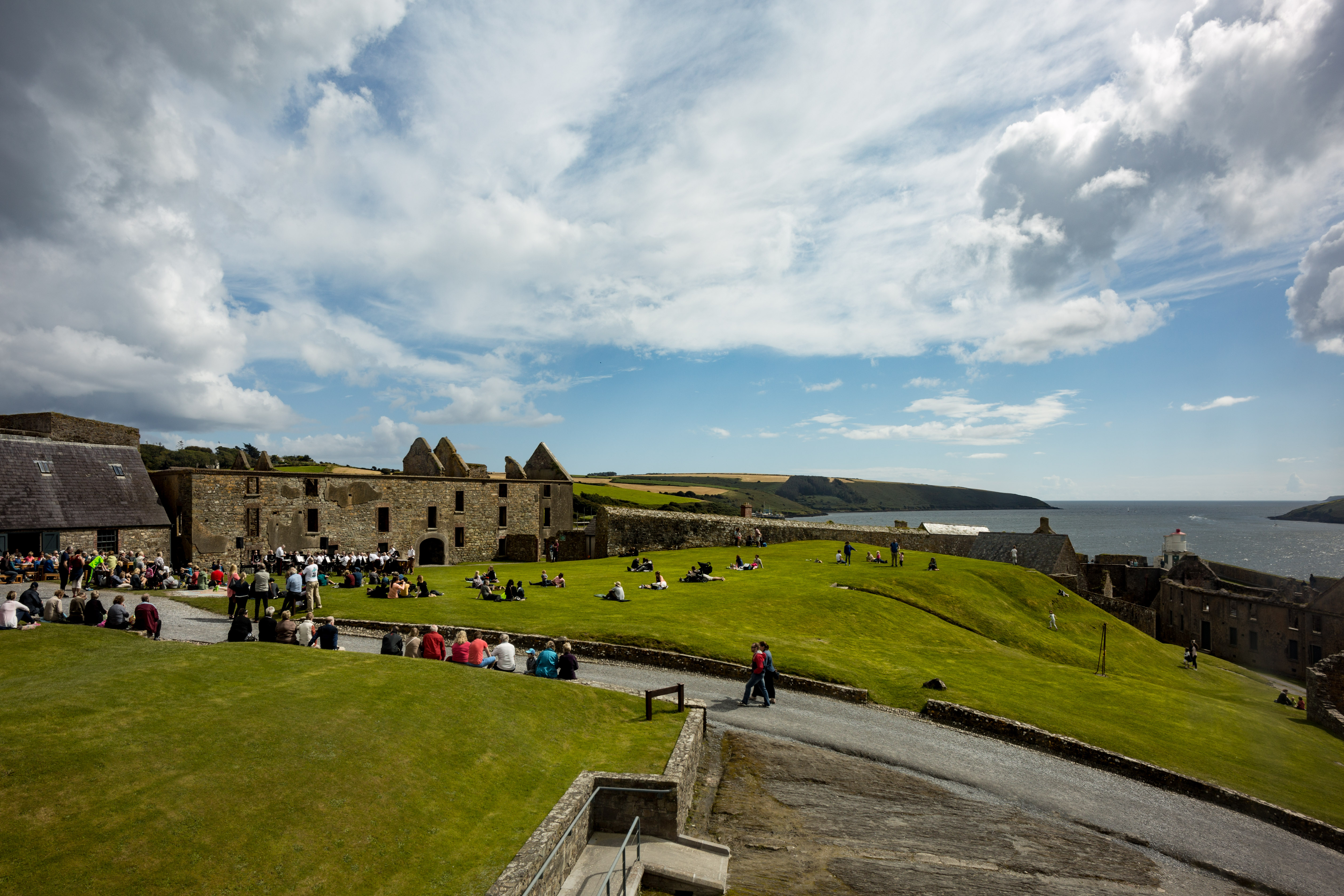
The Band of the 1st Brigade at Charles Fort, Kinsale for Heritage Week 2015

National Heritage Week (Irish: Seachtain Náisiúnta na hOidhreachta) is an annual series of thousands of events, usually held during the last week of August, organised by the Heritage Council of Ireland. It is one of the country's largest cultural celebrations with over 2,400 events taking place nationwide in 2025.

It is a celebration of Ireland's culture, history, gardens, and architecture that gives visitors free entry to landmarks that usually charge an entry fee or are closed to the public. The week's attractions includes tours, events and activities related to history and culture.

National Heritage Week is part of the European Heritage Days, a joint action between the Council of Europe and the European Commission. There is a volunteer programme associated with the organisation of the events.

Event guides are available at tourist offices, libraries, heritage centres, museums, bus stations, and in many hotels. Competitions are held as part of the weeks' activities, and awards – nominated by the public – for the volunteers and organisations who put on the best events.

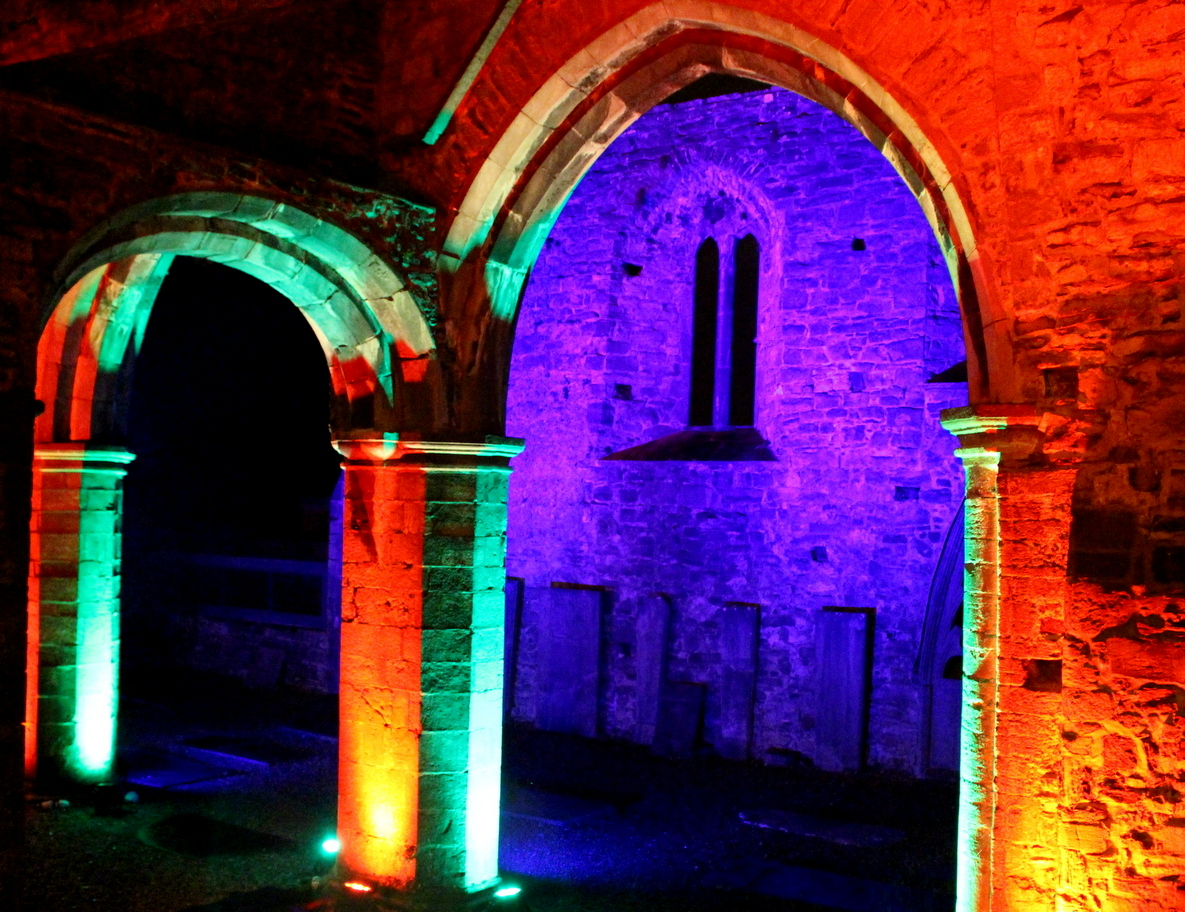
Sligo Abbey lit up for National Heritage Week 2013.

== Awards ==
- Heritage Hero, for a person or organisation
- Hidden Heritage, for lesser known sites
- Reaching Out, for attracting new audiences
- Cool for Kids, for family events

== See also ==
- European Heritage Days
- Heritage Open Days in England
