= Qiu Jie =

- Born: 1961 (age 64–65); Shanghai, China

Qiu Jie (Chinese: 邱节; born 1961) is a Chinese artist working in Switzerland, France and China. He was born in Shanghai, China.

== Style ==
Qiu Jie weaves together Western pop culture and advertising with Chinese iconography to create intricate, internationally acclaimed pencil drawings.

== Exhibitions ==
The solo exhibitions of Qiu Jie include:

- 1985 Palace of Culture, Xu Hui, Shanghai
- 1992 Museum of Fine Arts, Shanghai (with Shen Fan)
- 1992 OP.ERA Gallery, Geneva
- 1994 Andata/Ritorno Gallery, Geneva
- 1998 Crosnier Hall, Palais de l'Athénée, Geneva
- 1998 Martin Krebs Gallery, Bern
- 1999 "UQS 1" arcade space, Zurich
- 1999 "UQS 2" Artamis Stargazer Gallery, Zurich (with Tomas Schunke)
- 2000 Museum of Contemporary Art, Basel (with Ai Wei Wei)
- 2000 The BF15 space for contemporary art, Lyon
- 2004 Martin Krebs Gallery, Bern (with J. F. Luthy and P. Stoffel)
- 2004 Centre d'art en l'île, Geneva
- 2006 Leda Fletcher Gallery, Geneva
- 2013 Art Plural Gallery, Singapore

He has also participated in group shows including:

- 1999 Change Directory: Kunsthalle, Bern
- 1999 Somewhere one: Attitudes - contemporary arts space, Geneva
- 2001 Mai 1968: Museum of Modern and Contemporary Art, Geneva
- 2003 Colours make the wall: Factory Secheron, Geneva
- 2004 Art of Shanghai: Gallery Leda Fletcher
- 2005 Discover-Rediscover: Rath Museum, Geneva
- 2006 Shanghai Biennale: Museum of Contemporary Art, Shanghai

== Education ==
- 1994 École Supérieure des Beaux-Arts, Genève, Switzerland (now HEAD – Genève, Haute école d'art et de design / Geneva University of Art and Design)
- 1981 Shanghai Art Installation School, China
