= Artiscope Gallery =

Art gallery in Brussels, Belgium

Coordinates: 50.83532°N 4.406°E

- Company type: Contemporary art gallery
- Industry: Art gallery
- Founded: 1977
- Headquarters: Brussels, Belgium

Artiscope is an art gallery in Brussels, Belgium, specialized in contemporary American and European artists. Artiscope Gallery has organized exhibitions in collaboration with many museums in Belgium and Germany.

== History ==
Created in 1972 by Zaira Mis, Artiscope introduced many of the frontrunners of the Italian art scene to Belgium, including Arte Povera proponents Alighiero Boetti, Giuseppe Penone, Michelangelo Pistoletto, and Giulio Paolini, as well as members of the Transavanguardia movement, such as Sandro Chia, Francesco Clemente, Enzo Cucchi and Mimmo Paladino.

== Artists ==
Sandro Chia, Enzo Cucchi, Man Ray, Enrico De Paris, Mimmo Paladino, Mauro Staccioli, Gérard Titus-Carmel, Guillaume Bottazzi.

== Collaboration with Museums ==
- Horta Museum, Brussels, exhibition Enzo Cucchi: Scultura, 1988
- Musée Communal des Beaux Arts d’Ixelles, Brussels, exhibition Fabrizio Plessi, 2000
- Royal Museums of Fine Arts of Belgium, Mimmo Paladino, 2003
- Musée Ianchelevici, La Louvière, exhibition Mauro Staccioli : le lieu de la sculpture, 2003
- Atomium, Brussels, exhibition Enrico T. De Paris, Inside, 2007.
- Musee Ianchelevici, La Louvière, exhibition Bernardi Roig, L’œil du connaisseur, œuvres dans les collections belges, 2013, exhibition catalogue ISBN 978-2-930-61703-9.

== Publications ==
- Schwander, Martin (1988). Enzo Cucchi : scultura, 1982-1988. Munich: Zaira Mis & Bernd Klüser. OCLC 39188306.
- Testori, Giovanni (1989). I lini della Veronica. Bruxelles: Artiscope. OCLC 165333055.
- Mis, Zaira (1993). Enzo Cucchi. Idoli. Brussels: Artiscope. OCLC 901253671.
- Gilsoul, Guy; Floorizone, Patrick (1999). Cucchi, Ensor/Enzo. Brussels: Artiscope. OCLC 901524395.
- Peter Blake, catalogue of the exhibition held at Artiscope. Printed by Drifosset, Brussels, 2003.
- Katalin Mollek Burmeister, Mario Bertoni, Paolo Cesarini, Fabrizio Corneli. Micat in vertice, printed by Artiscope, Brussels, 2005, 143 p.
