= Heritage Open Days =

Annual celebration of England's architecture

Coordinates: 51.497358°N 0.147075°W

- Purpose: Public access to historical landmarks
- Headquarters: 20 Grosvenor Gardens, London SW1W 0DH
- Region served: England
- Website: heritageopendays.org.uk

Heritage Open Days (also known as HODs) is an annual celebration of England's history and culture that allows visitors free access to heritage sites and community events that are not usually open to the public, would normally charge an entrance fee, or that are hosting an event for the festival. It takes place in September.

Heritage Open Days was established in 1994 as England's contribution to European Heritage Days, in which 49 countries now participate. It is one of England's biggest voluntary cultural events, attracting some 800,000 people every year and bringing together over 2,500 organisations, 5,000 events and 40,000 volunteers.

The equivalent event in Wales is Open Doors, in Scotland Doors Open Days, and in Northern Ireland European Heritage Days. Open House London is also part of the initiative and takes place in September.

== Impact and Legacy ==
Heritage Open Days has grown significantly since its inception. Each year, over 5,000 events are held, with participation from a wide range of heritage organizations, individuals, and communities. The festival has played a vital role in raising awareness about the importance of preserving England's historic environment and fostering a sense of national pride.

== Related Initiatives ==
Heritage Open Days is part of the broader European Heritage Days programme, which involves over 50 countries. Other UK nations have similar initiatives, including Scotland's Doors Open Days and Wales's Open Doors.

== See also ==
- European Heritage Days
- Heritage Week in Ireland
- Visit My Mosque
- Doors Open Days
