= Nan Qi (artist) =

Chinese artist

Nan Qi (Nan Xi 南溪)
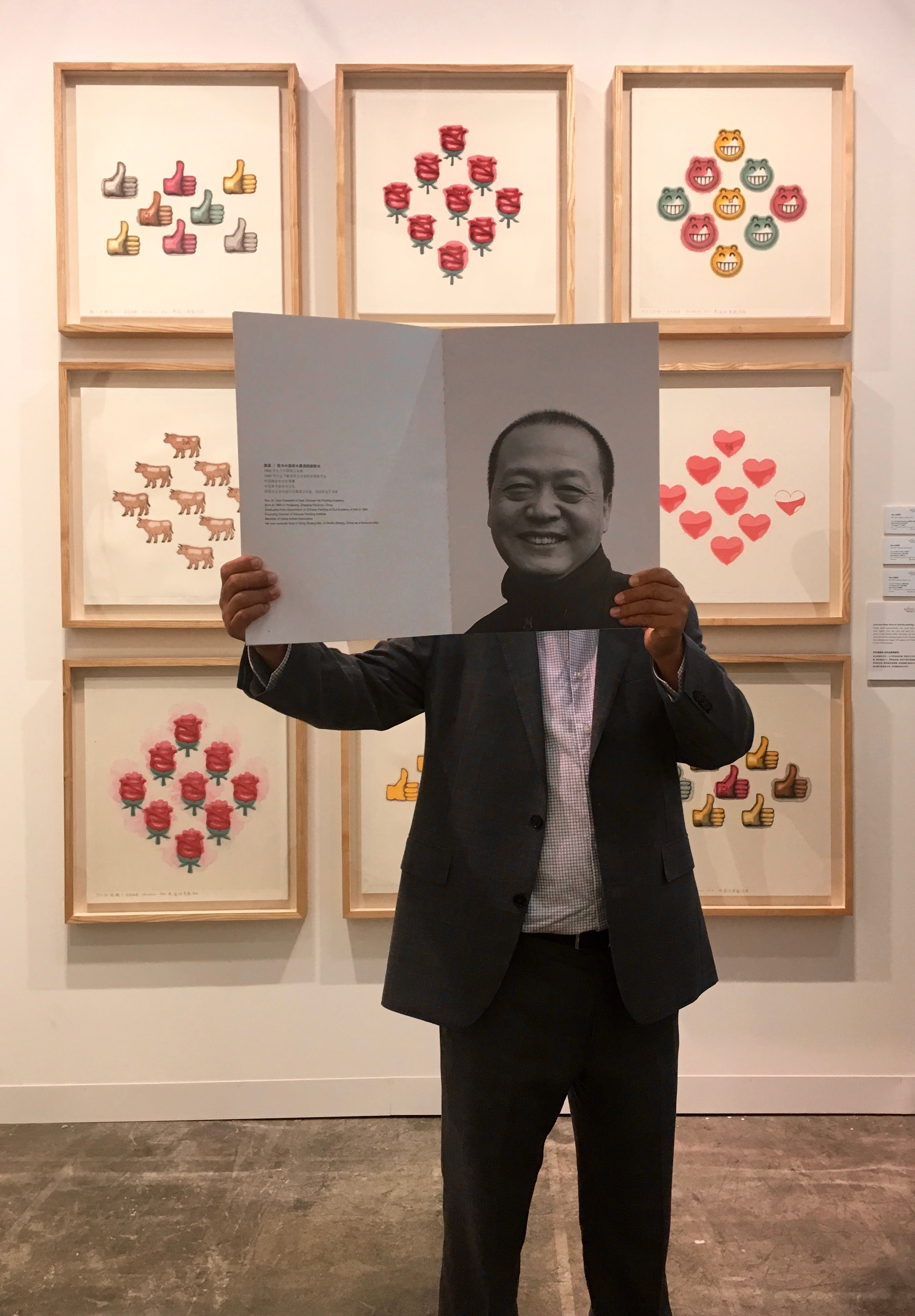
- Nan Qi, 2016
- Born: July 25, 1960 (age 66); Yongkang, Zhejiang, China
- Education: People's Liberation Army Academy of Art
- Known for: Painting, drawing
- Movement: Contemporary Art

Nan Qi or Nan Xi (Chinese: 南溪; born July 25, 1960) is a Chinese artist based in Beijing. He is best known for his "halo dot" paintings which combine traditional Chinese ink painting methodology with modern technology, creating a "Ben-Day" dot-like effect.

== Biography ==
Nan Qi was born to a peasant family in Yongkang, Zhejiang, China in 1960. Having spent his childhood during the upheaval of the Cultural Revolution, Nan experienced extreme poverty as a child and joined the People’s Liberation Army at the age of 18. He graduated from the People’s Liberation Army Academy of Art in 1986, having specialised in traditional Chinese landscape ink painting.

Nan Qi is a contemporary Chinese ink painter depicting a variety of themes, ranging from the human form to landscapes and abstract concentric ink dots, using Chinese ink and xuan rice paper. During his training as a Chinese ink painter, Nan Qi specialised in classical landscapes inspired by Tang, Song, Yuan, Ming, and Qing dynasty artists. Early experimentation with different brush strokes and techniques, varying the dilution of ink and wash, resulted in the distinctive ink “dabs” produced in his early works. During the mid-to-late 1990s, Nan began designing and printing the catalogues for his own exhibitions, and was inspired by the dot matrices used in printing. This gave rise to a progression from ink “dabs” to more and more dot-like brush strokes, culminating in his development of his signature “halo dot” brush stroke in 2004. At this point, the themes and content of Nan’s work were becoming solidly contemporary and modern, moving away from landscapes. Over the next ten years, Nan developed a completely unique repertoire of brush strokes and ink painting techniques, including the “halo dot”, the “Nan Qi Way” for controlling ink flow into highly absorbent rice paper, and the “3D ink” technique, which allows him to create three-dimensional optical illusions by hand.

Nan has two daughters with his former wife Susan, an English lecturer. He currently lives and works in Song Zhuang, an artist's community in Beijing, China.

== Artwork ==
Nan's classical training in traditional Chinese ink painting created the discipline and grounding for his later innovation in pushing the boundaries of his media: ink and xuan paper. His paintings portray women, men, animals, buildings, landscapes, banknotes, and abstract giant "halo dots" in a contemporary and straightforward fashion whilst remaining true to the millennia-long artistic tradition he draws on. The subject matter of his paintings reflects Nan’s desire to hold up a mirror to the shifting political and socio-economic climate in China, whilst playfully drawing his audience into the "halo dots" that make up these images.

=== Early work ===
Nan’s early work emphasises his strong connection to traditional Chinese culture and his fascination with the lyricism of ancient Chinese landscape artists. His mountainous scenes from the late 1980s and early 1990s feature strong, inky brushwork broken up by ink “dabs” which showcase the rugged textures of these rocky landscapes. Small figures, mules, and remote hamlets appear regularly in these early works, reminiscent of his rural upbringing.

His marriage to an English woman in 1989, and their honeymoon at Beidaihe beach, began Nan's forays into producing mesmerising seascapes and pursuing a more contemporary aesthetic. These works retained the strong brushwork of his mountain landscapes whilst moving towards realism in his representation of waves and ocean spray. A year after the birth of his first daughter, Nan holidayed in France and the United Kingdom and was exposed to Surrealism, Modernism, Cubism, and other 20th-Century artistic movements for the first time. This proved to be a career-defining vacation, as his mountain landscapes took on a futuristic, Cubist atmosphere which enhanced the eeriness of lonely mountains in the mist.

=== Halo Dots ===
In the late 1990s, dissatisfied with the quality and cost-effectiveness of printing companies, Nan began designing and printing his own exhibition catalogues in Shenzhen, China. Examining proofs at the printing press and learning how image printing works, Nan developed an interest in the minute dot matrices that make up every print image. This led to a five-year period of experimentation with ink "dabs", which eventually evolved into Nan's signature "halo dot" in 2004. His process of painting single ink dots and carefully controlling the absorption rate of ink into the rice paper creates a concentric layering effect. Nan’s large-scale abstract “halo dot” paintings are reminiscent of Rorschach blots, bringing to mind flowers, vulvas, eggs, or stars. His figurative and landscape dot paintings create a pointillist effect from a distance and, when viewed up-close, reveal a web of almost-touching "halo dots" which are completely unique from each other.

=== 3D Ink Art ===
Nan developed his 3D Ink art technique after unearthing a forgotten copy of a 1970s book of optical illusions in his library at home. Combining modern digital technology and traditional ink painting techniques with his "halo dots", Nan worked for three years in a process of trial and error to produce apparently abstract or corrupted images. By alternately focusing and unfocusing their eyes, viewers are able to bring three-dimensional optical illusions into view, apparently floating above the paintings. These illusions appear and disappear in the blink of an eye, and often viewers are only able to obtain a fleeting glimpse of the image. Nan's 3D Ink Art sparked some controversy among China's ink painting critics when debuted, setting off a debate between Li Xieting and Liu Xiaochun about the nature of contemporary ink painting in China.

== Exhibitions ==
=== Selected solo exhibitions ===
- Ink.Dot.Pop: The Art of Nan Qi, The LUXE Art Museum, Singapore, 2017
- Art Home: Power of Dots Private Viewing, Basel, Switzerland, 2016
- What’s In A Dot? Nan Qi’s Post-Pop Experiment, G-Dot Art Space, MidTown Pop, Hong Kong, 2016
- Nan Qi Solo Exhibition, Art Stage Singapore 2015, Art Plural Gallery, Singapore, 2015
- Art Car: Car, Power, Sex Pop-Up Exhibition, Green Art Asia, Hong Kong, 2015
- Nan Qi: Authority, Sex, Money, Art Plural Gallery, Singapore, 2013
- Digital Ink Images: Art by Nan Qi, Shanghai Art Museum, Shanghai, 2011
- Eerie 3D: 3-D Ink Art by Nan Qi, G-Dot Art Space, Beijing, 2011
- Ink and Sex Series: Works by Nan Qi, Yisulang Art Gallery, Singapore, 2006
- Landscape and Seascape: Nan Qi Ink Painting Exhibition, Hong Kong Arts Centre, Hong Kong, 1998
- Ink Paintings by Nan Qi, Xianggena Gallery, Shanghai, 1997
- Landscape Paintings by Nan Qi, National Museum of Art (Confucius Temple), Beijing, 1987

=== Selected group exhibitions ===
- Art Basel 2017 HK, Alisan Fine Arts, Hong Kong, 2017
- Being and Inking: Documenting Contemporary Ink Art(2001-2016), Redtory Art & Design Factory, Guangzhou, 2016
- The 9th International In Art Biennale of Shenzhen: New Chinese Painting vs. New Ink Painting, Guan Shanyue Art Museum, Shenzhen, 2016
- In Retrospect 2016: Contemporary Ink and Wash Exhibition, G-Dot Art Space, Beijing, 2016
- Like / Not Like. Contemporary Ink Exhibition, Wuhan Art Space, Wuhan, 2015
- Exhibition of Fine Artworks of Contemporary China: Chinese Culture Tour to South Asia, India Habitat Centre, New Delhi and Bangladesh National Museum, Dhaka, 2015
- Western Clouds and Eastern Language, Wuhan Art Museum, Wuhan, 2014
- Ethereal Dimness, Avant-Garde Contemporary Art Centre, Nanjing, 2014
- Water and Ink Methods: Chinese Academic Invitational Exhibition, Today Art Museum, Beijing, 2013
- New Dimensions in Ink·1st Nomination Exhibition of Chinese Contemporary Ink, National Museum of Art, Beijing, 2013
- Freehand Cina: Mostra degli Artisti Nominati Cinacontemporanea dei Quadri ad Inchiostri, Casa dei Carraresi in Italia, Treviso, Italy 2013
- London Olympics 2012: China Art Exhibition, Burlington House, Royal Academy of Art, London, 2012
- 4th Beijing International Art Biennale, National Museum of Art, Beijing, 2010
- Historical Image Chinese Contemporary Art Exhibition, Shenzhen Art Museum, Shenzhen, 2009
- Catharsis Invitational Exhibition, LDX Gallery, Beijing, 2008
- Ink/Not Ink Invitational Touring Exhibition, Shenzhen Art Museum, Shenzhen; Today Art Museum, Beijing; Kimmel Center for the Performing Arts, Philadelphia, USA, 2008
- Waves: Contemporary Chinese Ink and Wash Methods, Tianjin Academy of Fine Arts, Tianjin, 2006
- 2nd Beijing International Art Biennale, National Museum of Art, Beijing, 2005
- 4th Shenzhen International Ink Painting Biennale: Ink/Wash and the City, Shenzhen Art Museum, Shenzhen, 2004
- 1st Beijing International Art Biennale, National Museum of Art, Beijing, 2003
- 2nd Shenzhen International Ink Painting Biennale: Ink/Wash and the City, Guan Shanyue Museum, Shenzhen, 2000
- Exhibition of Chinese Paintings by Liu Dawei and Nan Qi, Changfugong Arts Centre, Beijing, 1990
