= Swiss Information Centre for Cultural Heritage Conservation =

Swiss organisation

The Swiss Information Centre for Cultural Heritage Conservation (Nationale Informationsstelle für Kulturgüter-Erhaltung, abbreviated "NIKE"), is a Swiss association that advocates cultural heritage conservation in Switzerland.

The information centre's offices are located in Bern. The centre represents 36 associations and public organisations represented, in the fields of archeology, folklore and historic preservation. The NIKE organises the "Denkmaltage", the Swiss version of the yearly European Heritage Days, which allows visitors to see National Heritage Sites on the Swiss Inventory of Cultural Property of National and Regional Significance that are not normally open to the public, as well as sites of archaeological and architectural significance. The NIKE also publishes a periodical, the NIKE Bulletin, which appears five to six times a year with a circulation of 2,400 copies.
