= Heritage Council (Ireland) =

Government agency of Ireland

The Heritage Council
- Formation: 10 July 1995; 31 years ago
- Type: Quango
- Headquarters: Church Lane, Kilkenny, R95 X264
- CEO: Virginia Teehan
- Revenue: €13.54m (2022)
- Website: www.heritagecouncil.ie

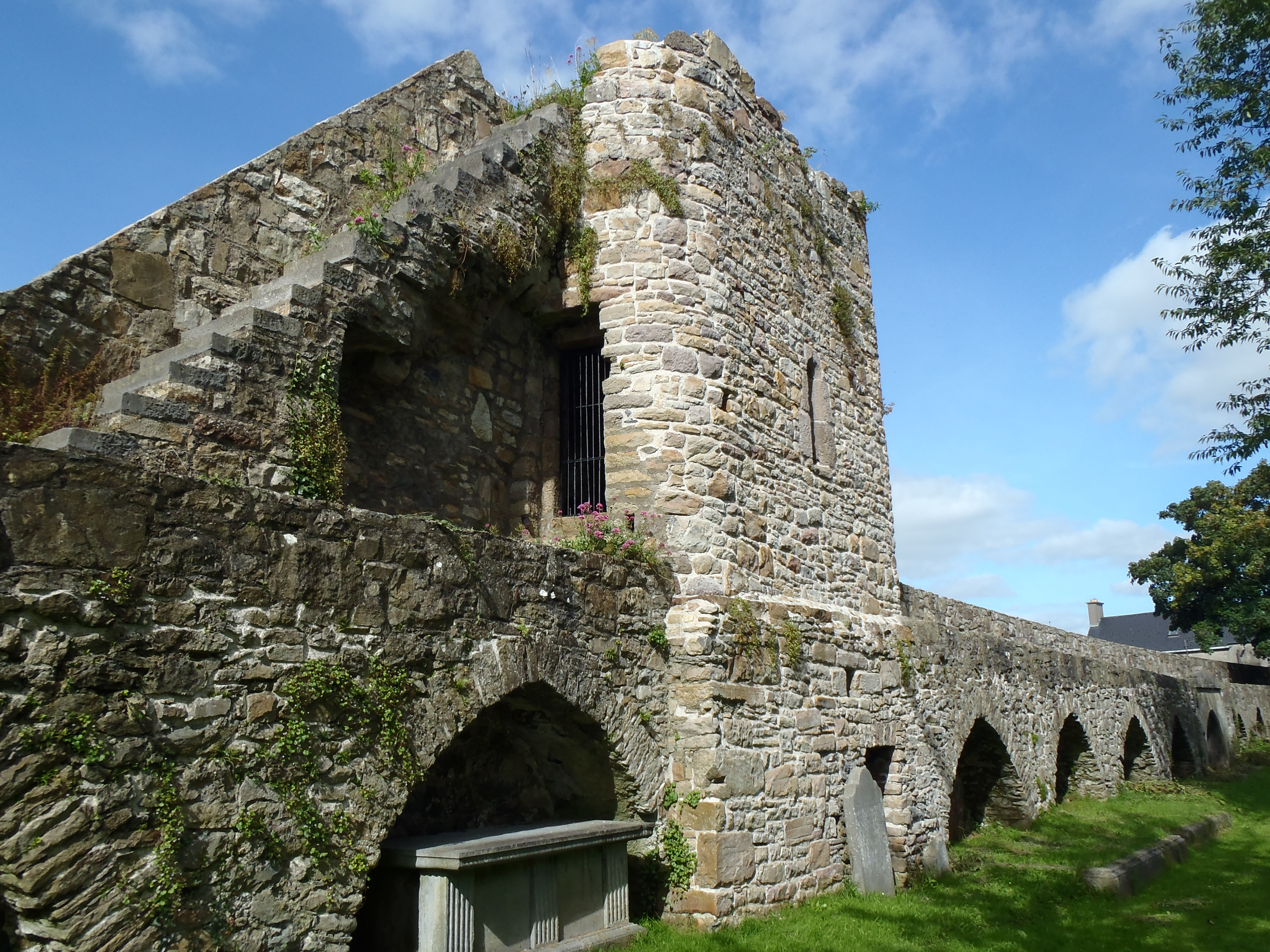
Conserved medieval town walls of Clonmel, Co. Tipperary which were granted funding by the Heritage Council.

The Heritage Council (Irish: An Comhairle Oidhreachta) is an organisation created by the Irish government to "engage, educate and advocate to develop a wider understanding of the vital contribution that our heritage makes to our social, environmental and economic well-being."

The Heritage Council was established under the Heritage Act 1995, which was signed into law on 10 April 1995. On 10 July 1995, Michael D. Higgins TD, the Minister for Arts, Culture and the Gaeltacht "announced the appointment of a new statutory Heritage Council" under the terms of the act.

Its current CEO is Virginia Teehan.

The Council's purview includes monuments, archaeological objects, heritage objects such as art and industrial works, documents and genealogical records, architectural heritage, flora, fauna, wildlife habitats, landscapes, seascapes, wrecks, geology, heritage gardens, parks and inland waterways.

The Heritage Council organizes the annual Heritage Week in Ireland. It also has a grants scheme.

== Initiatives ==
=== Irish Walled Towns Network ===
In 2005, the Heritage Council formed the Irish Walled Towns Network (IWTN). The role of the IWTN is to help the walled towns of Ireland become better places in which to live, work and visit. The network does this through providing grants for medieval town wall repairs, secondly, by providing grants for community festivals and heritage interpretation, thirdly, training community groups on how best to use their place's heritage and finally, by coordinating research and publishing advisory documents. In 2013, the IWTN's education programme won the European Union Prize for Cultural Heritage/Europa Nostra Award.

=== Museum Standards Programme for Ireland ===
The Heritage Council established the Museums Standards Programme for Ireland (MSPI) in 2007, to benchmark and promote professional standards in the care of collections and to recognise through accreditation the achievement of those standards within the Irish museum sector. As of 2020, 43 museums have been fully accredited through the MSPI programme.

== See also ==
- An Taisce
- National Trust, in Northern Ireland
- The Discovery Programme
