= Art Plural Gallery =

Coordinates: 1.29417°N 103.84945°E

- Established: May 2011
- Location: 38 Armenian Street, Singapore
- Type: art gallery
- Director: Frédéric de Senarclens
- Website: http://www.artpluralgallery.com

Art Plural Gallery is an art gallery in Singapore. It shows modern and contemporary art and design. It has been called one of the ten best contemporary art galleries in Singapore and in 2013 was named as one of the world's best new galleries.

== History ==
The gallery was founded in 2011 by a Swiss art dealer, Frédéric de Senarclens. It occupies 1,100 square metres (12,000 sq ft) in a historic Art Deco building on Armenian Street, in the cultural district of Singapore. It opened on 3 June 2011 with "Avant Première", which included works by Marc Quinn, Fernando Botero, Fabienne Verdier, Bernar Venet and Shirin Neshat.

Artists who have exhibited at the gallery include Pablo Reinoso, Ian Davenport, Bernar Venet, Shirin Neshat, Fabienne Verdier, Chun Kwang Young and Qiu Jie.

In early 2012 the gallery started its Emerging Artists programme to promote the work of promising artists at an early stage of their career. The programme offers the selected artist a first solo show in the gallery. Siddhartha Tawadey was the first artist to exhibit under this programme.

By 2013 about 35% of the clients of the gallery were from Singapore; some overseas clients visit the gallery. About 25% of sales are made online.

== Publications ==
Catalogues published by the gallery include:

- Olivia Ludlow (2011). Regards Croisés: A Selection of Asian Contemporary Art.
- Henri-François Debailleux (2012). Pablo Reinoso: Scribbling Power.
- Joséphine Matamoros (2012). Tom Carr: Visualisation de la pensée. Barcelona: Comanegra; Singapore: Art Plural Gallery.
- Michael Stanley (2012). Ian Davenport: Between the Lines.
- Caroline Ward (2013). Chun Kwang Young.
- Michael Peppiatt, Jane A Peterson (2014). Art Plural: Voices of Contemporary Art. Singapore: Gatehouse.
