= Pablo Reinoso (designer) =

Argentine–French artist and designer (born 1955)

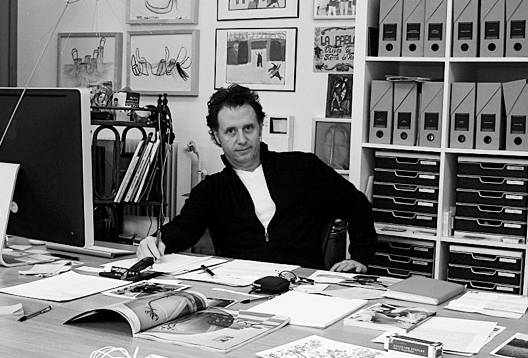
- Pablo Reinoso
- Born: 8 March 1955 (age 71); Buenos Aires
- Known for: Installations; Furniture design Architecture
- Notable work: Spaghetti benches
- Website: pabloreinoso.com

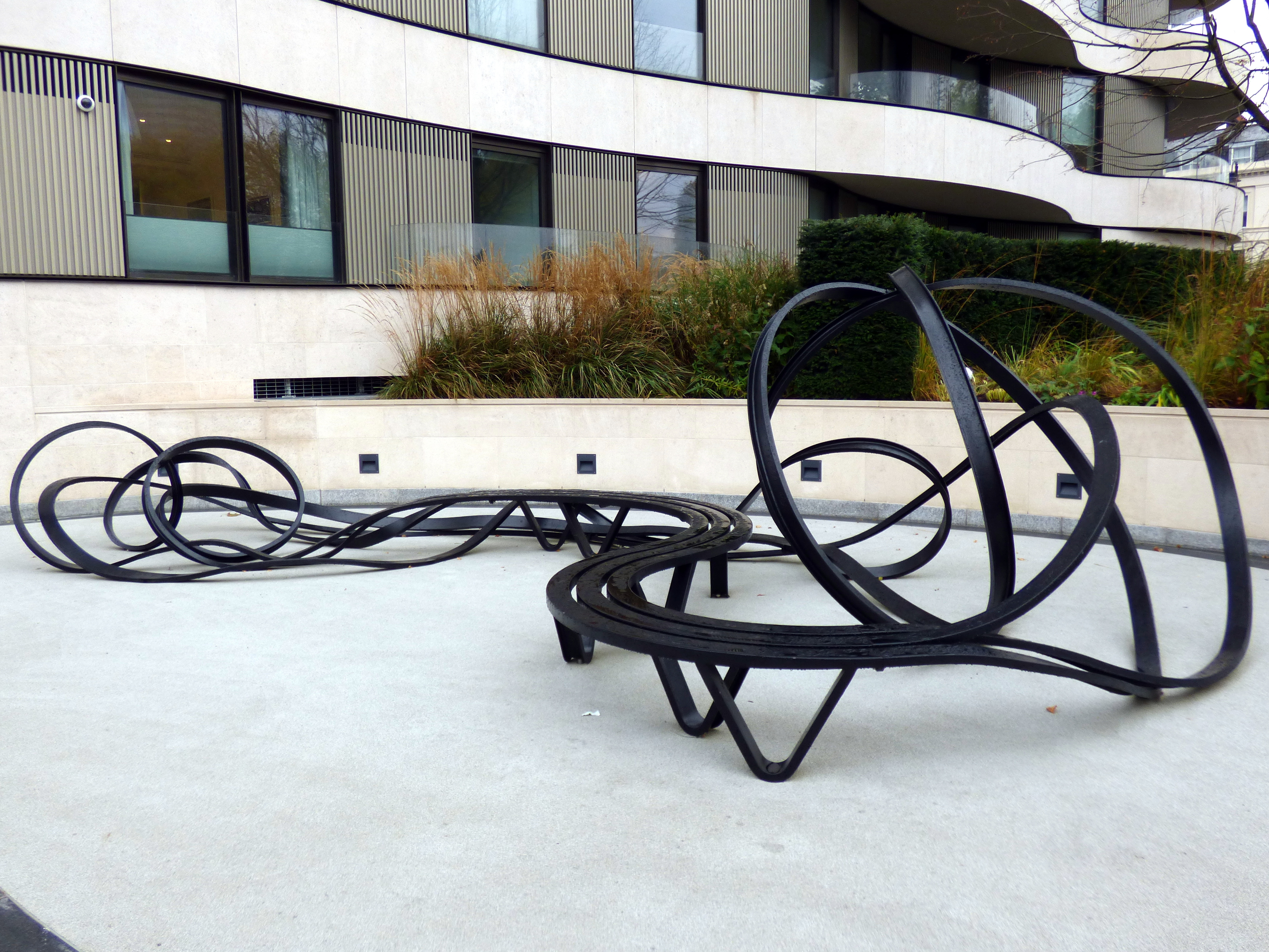
We Watch You Too bench in Millbank, London

Pablo Reinoso (born 8 March 1955, Buenos Aires, Argentina) is an Argentine–French artist and designer who has been working in Paris since 1978.

== Biography ==
Pablo Reinoso was introduced to carpentry by his French grandfather. He made his first chair when he was six years old. He went on to study architecture in University of Buenos Aires and began a career in communications and design.

Reinoso has lived and worked in Paris since 1978. He became known for his public installations and sculptures, created from traditional materials such as metal, stone and wood. After 1995 he began to introduce a wider range of materials, such as cloth in his installations Respirantes, Persistantes and Contractantes. In the late 1990s he broadened his work in a commercial direction to include the design of products, for example perfume bottles. In 2003 he designed a new cup for the French Ligue de Football Professionnel.

In 2012 Reinoso had his first Asian exhibition, at the Art Plural Gallery in Singapore, showing 15 sculptures. That year he won the Konex Award from Argentina in design. Eleven of his works were shown in Macau as part of Le French May in 2013. In 2020 Waddington Custot in London combined a solo digital exhibition with a presentation in the gallery.

In 2022 Débordements, Reinoso's largest solo exhibition to date, was held at the UNESCO World Heritage Site Château de Chambord, France.

The critic Patricia Avena Navarro described Reinoso as a "sensible artist, his work is informed by a complex sphere of relations that include the biographic due to their link with art history and the world of psychoanalysis, which announce the absolute triumph of the image."

Reinoso lives in Malakoff, a suburb of Paris.

== Notable work ==
- Respirantes (1996), Persistantes (1998) and Contractantes – cloth art installations
- Rue Payenne Apartment, Paris – architectural renovation
