= Miyanomori Art Museum =

Museum in Sapporo, Japan

Coordinates: 43°3′25.78″N 141°18′8.82″E

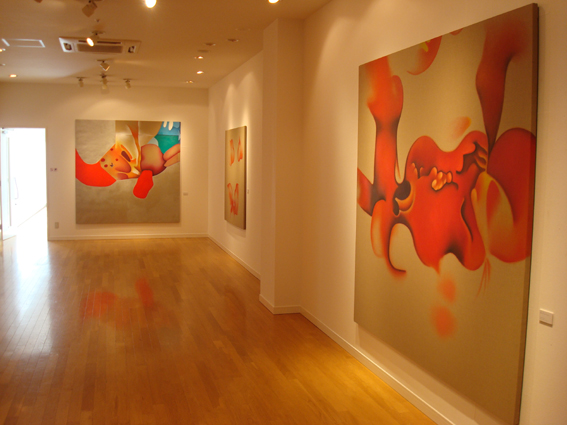
- Established: 2006
- Location: Sapporo, Hokkaido, Japan
- Website: miyanomori-art.jp

Miyanomori Art Museum (宮の森美術館, Miyanomori Bijutsukan) is a museum of contemporary art located in Sapporo, Japan, that was established in April 2006 and is now closed.

== Presentation ==
The Miyanomori Art Museum is the main contemporary art museum in Hokkaido. It presents works from the contemporary international and Japanese art scene.

== Collection ==
The collection features works of Japanese modern and contemporary art from the 1950s to the 1970s. From the Museum's own estimation, it also has the largest collection of works by Christo and Jeanne-Claude in Asia and Oceania. The museum collection also includes about 3000 photographs from the artist Daidō Moriyama, which were taken since the 1950s, as well as works by such artists as Lucio Fontana, Frank Stella, Jasper Johns, Yoshishige Saitō, Lee Ufan, Guillaume Bottazzi, Sadamasa Motonaga, Takeo Yamaguchi, and Kumi Sugai.

== Exhibitions ==
- Christo and Jeanne-Claude — 2006–2007 — Retrospective.
- Kenji Yanobe — 2007 — Exhibition
- ja:榎忠 Chu Enoki — 2008 — Exhibition.
- Daido Moriyama — 2009 — Exhibition
- Guillaume Bottazzi — 2011 — Exhibition and permanent site-specific art work, 900 m² on the museum.

== Editions ==
- MORIYAMA Daido NORTHERN. Production: Miyanomori Art Museum. Editor: Akio Nagasawa Publishing. 2009, single print, 24 pages, limited edition (2,000 exemplary). Size: In-folio (54.5 × 40.5 cm).
- CHRISTO / JEANNE-CLAUDE. Works and Projects 1958–2006. Production: Miyanomori Art Museum, 2006. Editor: SAPA. 52 pages. Size : (21 × 30 × 0.5 cm).
- MORIYAMA Daido NORTHERN2. Production: Miyanomori Art Museum. Editor: Akio Nagasawa Publishing. 192 pages, Size: A4. 2010.
- MORIYAMA Daido NORTHERN3. Production: Miyanomori Art Museum. Editor: Akio Nagasawa Publishing. 2011.
