= Le French May =

French May Arts Festival (Chinese: 法國五月藝術節) is an annual arts festival organized by the Association Culturelle France - Hong Kong Limited to promote French art and culture. Events include visual arts, operas, classical and contemporary dance, music and theatre, circus as well as cinema.

== Exhibitions ==
- Chu The-Chun - University Museum and Art Gallery, Hong Kong (2010)
- Bettina Rheims, Rose, c’est Paris - Hong Kong City Hall (2011)
- Guillaume Bottazzi, Guillaume Bottazzi, wonderland - Hong Kong Central Library (2016)
