= Pablo Reinoso (footballer) =

Chilean football goalkeeper (born 1985)

Personal information
- Full name: Pablo César Reinoso Ojeda
- Date of birth: 18 December 1985 (age 40)
- Place of birth: Llay Llay, Chile
- Height: 1.88 m (6 ft 2 in)
- Position: Goalkeeper

Youth career
- Colo-Colo

Senior career*
Years	Team	Apps	(Gls)
2005–2006	Deportes Puerto Montt	3	(0)
2006	Rayo del Pacífico	–	(–)
2007	San Luis	0	(0)
2008	Trasandino	–	(–)
2009	Naval	21	(0)
2010–2011	Audax Italiano	4	(0)
2012	Unión Española	4	(0)
2012	Unión Española B	11	(0)
2013	San Marcos	7	(0)
2013	Deportes Linares	10	(0)
2014–2017	Ñublense	2	(0)
2019	Independiente Cauquenes	21	(0)
Total		83	(0)
- * Club domestic league appearances and goals

Pablo César Reinoso Ojeda (born 18 December 1985) is a Chilean former footballer who played as a goalkeeper.

== Club career ==
=== Early career ===
Born in Llay Llay, Reinoso traveled to Santiago for began his career ar Colo-Colo football academy at very young age. After years in the academy, he fail to be promoted to the first adult team.

In January 2005, aged 19, Reinoso joined as professional player to the Chilean Primera División club Deportes Puerto Montt as back-up of the first-choice goalkeeper Carlos Espinoza. His opportunities in the team were very limited, playing just three games, due to the good performances of his teammate Espinoza in the goal. Remaining until May 2006 in the city of Puerto Montt, after his bad spell in that club, Reinoso joined Tercera División amateur club Rayo del Pacífico. After spells in San Luis Quillota in the 2007 and Trasandino in the next season, he moved to Naval in January 2009.

=== Audax Italiano ===
On 3 December 2009, Reinoso was signed by Audax Italiano, after of try out with the team. After of his success being accepted as the second-choice keeper of the club, he very proud said that: "It's a very nice challenge for me play in Audax", adding that will learn much next to a referent like Jhonny Herrera.

On 25 January 2010, he debuted for Audax in a match against Ñublense, in where he shot to notoriety for conceding seven goals in his first game with the club. The same game he received goals two goals of Gabriel Rodríguez and one of Sebastián Malandra, Pablo González, José Luis Muñoz and Luis Núñez. Not obstant, he failed to make another appearance for the Primera División Tournament, due to the excellent performances of the first-choice keeper of the club, Jhonny Herrera, playing only that game against Ñublense. Following the departure of Herrera, Reinoso played the first three games of the 2011 Apertura Tournament, until the arrival of the Argentine keeper Alejandro Sánchez against Palestino, Universidad Católica and Cobresal. For the Clausura Tournament, Reinoso not played none match, due to the consecration of Sánchez in the goal.

=== Unión Española ===
On 31 December 2011, Reinoso joined to Audax's rival side Unión Española, due to the lack of keepers in the position, after the departures of Federico Elduayen and Rainer Wirth. He began to training with the team on 3 January 2012.
