= Davida =

Davida may refer to:

== Given name ==
- Davida Afzelius-Bohlin (1866–1955), Swedish mezzo-soprano
- Davida Allen (born 1951), Australian painter, filmmaker and writer
- Ottilie Davida Assing (1819–1884), German-American feminist, freethinker, and abolitionist
- Davida Coady (1938-2018), American pediatrician and international health activist
- Davida H. Comba (born 1928), wife of American astronomer Paul G. Comba, Davidacomba minor planet named after
- Davida DaVito, Marvel Comics character
- Davida Hawthorn (1918–20??), American table tennis player
- Davida Hesse-Lilienberg (1877–1964), Swedish operatic soprano
- C. Davida Ingram, conceptual artist
- Davida Karol (1917–2011), Israeli actress
- Davida Kidd (born 1956), Canadian artist
- Davida McKenzie (born 2006 or 2007), New Zealand actress
- Davida Rochlin (born 1951), American architect
- Davida Teller (1938–2011), American psychology professor
- Davida Williams (born 1986), American actress, singer, dancer, photographer, director, and producer
- Davida Wills Hurwin, American writer
- Davida White (born 1967), New Zealand rugby union player

== Surname ==
- George Davida, American computer scientist and cryptographer
- Osher Davida, Israeli footballer

== Other ==
- 511 Davida, large C-type asteroid
- Davida (NGO), NGO that supports sex workers in Brazil

== See also ==
- David (name)
- Davina
- Dawida (disambiguation)
