= Tetsuya Noda =

Japanese artist (born 1940)

- 野田 哲也
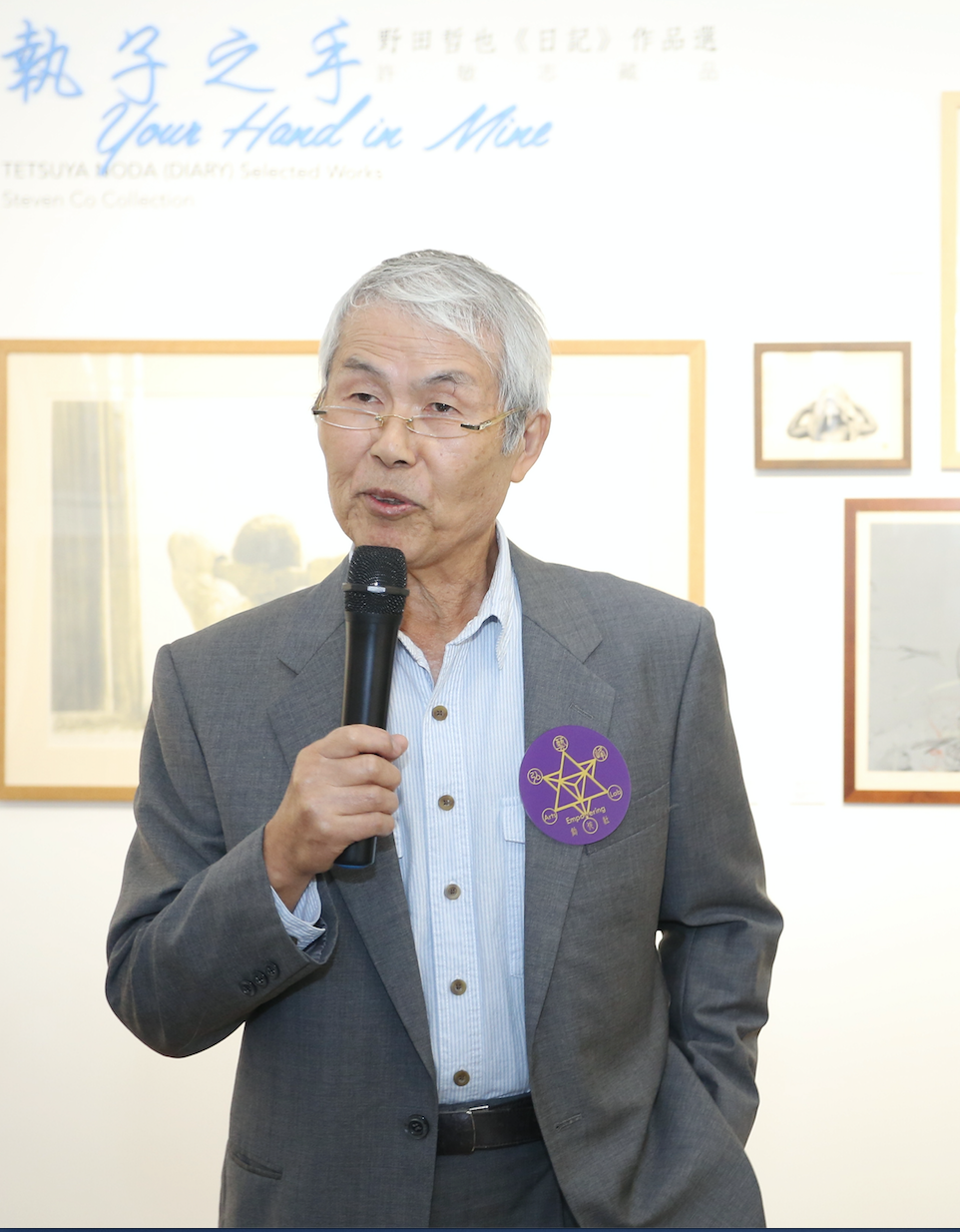
- Noda at opening of Your Hand in Mine
- Born: 5 March 1940 (age 86); Uki, Kumamoto, Japan
- Occupations: Print artist, Professor Emeritus of Tokyo University of the Arts
- Awards: International Grand Prize at 1968 6th International Biennial Exhibition of Prints in Tokyo, Grand Prize at 1977 Biennial of Graphic Art, Ljubliana, 2015 Awarded The Order of the Sacred Treasure, Gold Rays with Neck Ribbon by the Emperor of Japan

Tetsuya Noda (野田 哲也, Noda Tetsuya; born 5 March 1940) is a contemporary artist, printmaker and educator. He is widely considered to be Japan’s most important living print-artist, and one of the most successful contemporary print artists in the world. He is a professor emeritus of the Tokyo University of the Arts. Noda is most well-known for his visual autobiographical works done as a series of woodblock, print, and silkscreened diary entries that capture moments in daily life. His innovative method of printmaking involves photographs scanned through a mimeograph machine and then printed the images over the area previously printed by traditional woodblock print techniques onto the Japanese paper. Although this mixed-media technique is quite prosaic today, Noda was the first artist to initiate this breakthrough. Noda is the nephew of Hideo Noda an oil painter and muralist.

== Early life, family and education ==
Noda was born in the Shiranui Township of Uki, Kumamoto Prefecture, on 5 March 1940. In 1959, he entered the Department of Oil Painting, Faculty of Fine Arts, Tokyo National University of Fine Arts and Music (presently Tokyo National University of Fine Arts and Music), and graduated in 1963. In 1965, Noda completed graduate course at the Tokyo National University of Fine Arts and Music. Noda was a student of Tadashige Ono in the art of woodblock printmaking.

In June 1971, Noda married Dorit Bartur, the daughter of Moshe Bartur, then the Israeli ambassador to Japan. In 1972, their first son Izaya was born in October; and in 1974 their first daughter Rika was born in November.

== Career ==
- 1968 At the age of 28, Noda won the International Grand Prize at the Tokyo International Print Biennale for diptych Diary: August 22, 1968 and Diary: September 11, 1968.
- 1977 Appointed lecturer in the Faculty of Art, Tokyo National University of Fine Arts and Music.
- 1981 Promoted associate professor in the Faculty of Art, Tokyo National University of Fine Arts and Music, Japan.
- 1991 Became professor in the Faculty of Art, Tokyo National University of Fine Arts and Music, Japan.
- 1993 Gave lectures and workshops as a visiting artist at Macau Academy of Visual Arts, China.
- 1996 Appointed international judge at the 10th Seoul International Biennial of Print, South Korea
- 1998 Gave lectures and workshops as a visiting artist at the Columbia University, New York, United States of America.
- 2007 Retired as Professor Emeritus at the Tokyo University of the Arts.

== Awards ==
- 1968 International Grand Prize at the Tokyo International Print Biennale
- 1970 Warsaw National Museum Prize at the Krakow International Print Biennale
- 1972 2nd Prize at the Norwegian International Print Biennale
- 1974 Łódź Museum Prize at the Krakow International Print Biennale
- 1974 2nd Prize at the Norwegian International Print Biennale
- 1976 Prize of the Museum of Modern Art, Hyogo at the Tokyo International Print Biennale
- 1977 Grand Prize at the Ljubliana International Print Biennale
- 1978 Grand Prize at the Norwegian International Print Biennale
- 1980 Łódź Museum Prize at the Krakow International Print Biennale
- 1981 Belgrade Contemporary Museum Prize at the Ljubliana International Print Biennale
- 1981 Exhibition Prize at the Graphica Criativa, Finland
- 1984 Gold Medal at the Norwegian International Print Biennale
- 1986 Friends of Bradford Art Galleries and Museums Prize at the British International Print Biennale
- 1987 Grand Prize of Honor at the Ljubliana International Print Biennale
- 1993 Gen Yamaguchi Memorial Grand Prize, Numazu City
- 2003 Awarded with the Medal with Purple Ribbon by the Government of Japan
- 2015 Awarded The Order of the Sacred Treasure, Gold Rays with Neck Ribbon by the Emperor of Japan

== Major exhibitions ==
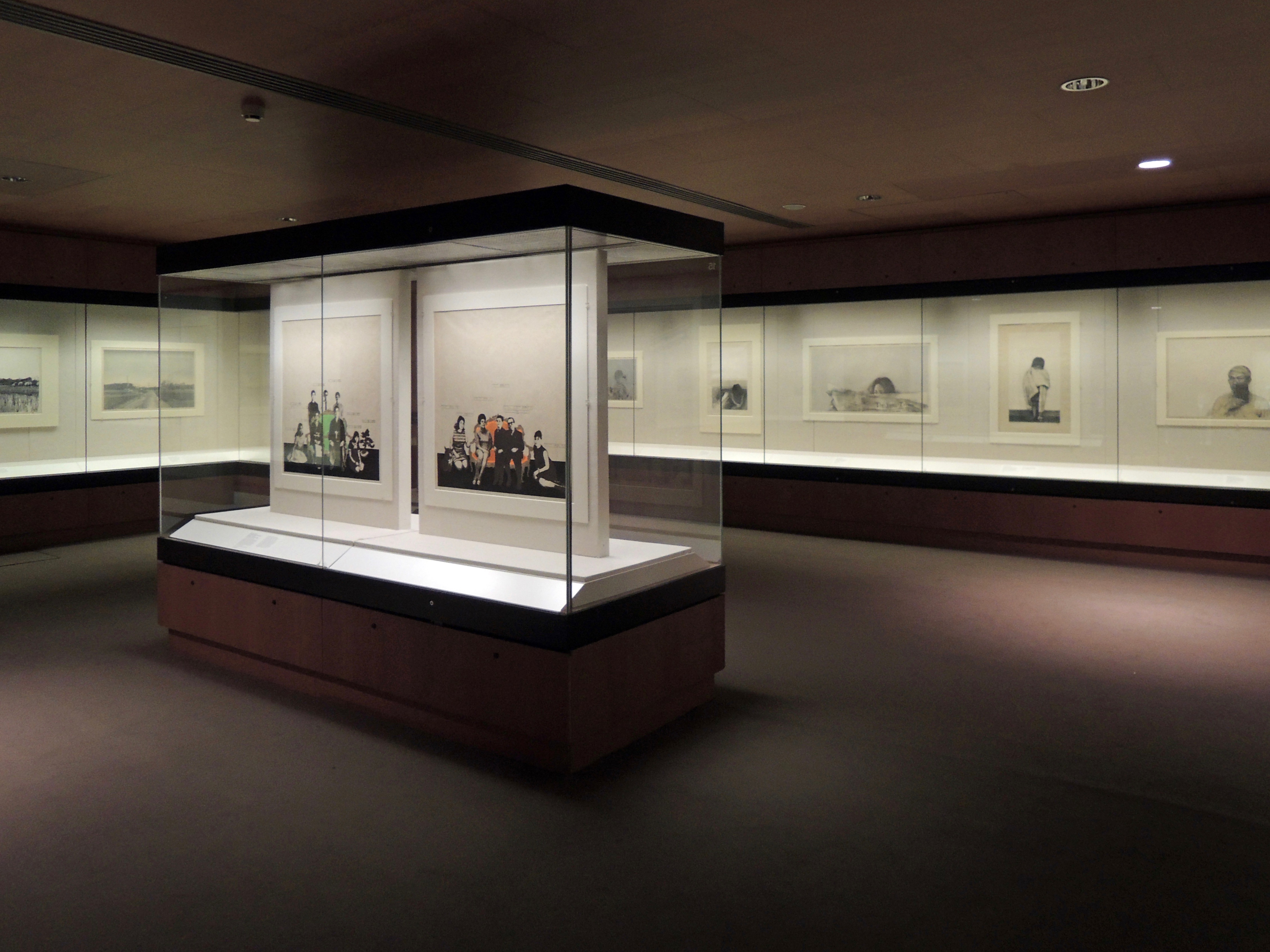
Partial installation view of NODA TETSUYA'S 'DIARY' at the British Museum Japanese Galleries from 5 April - 5 October 2014

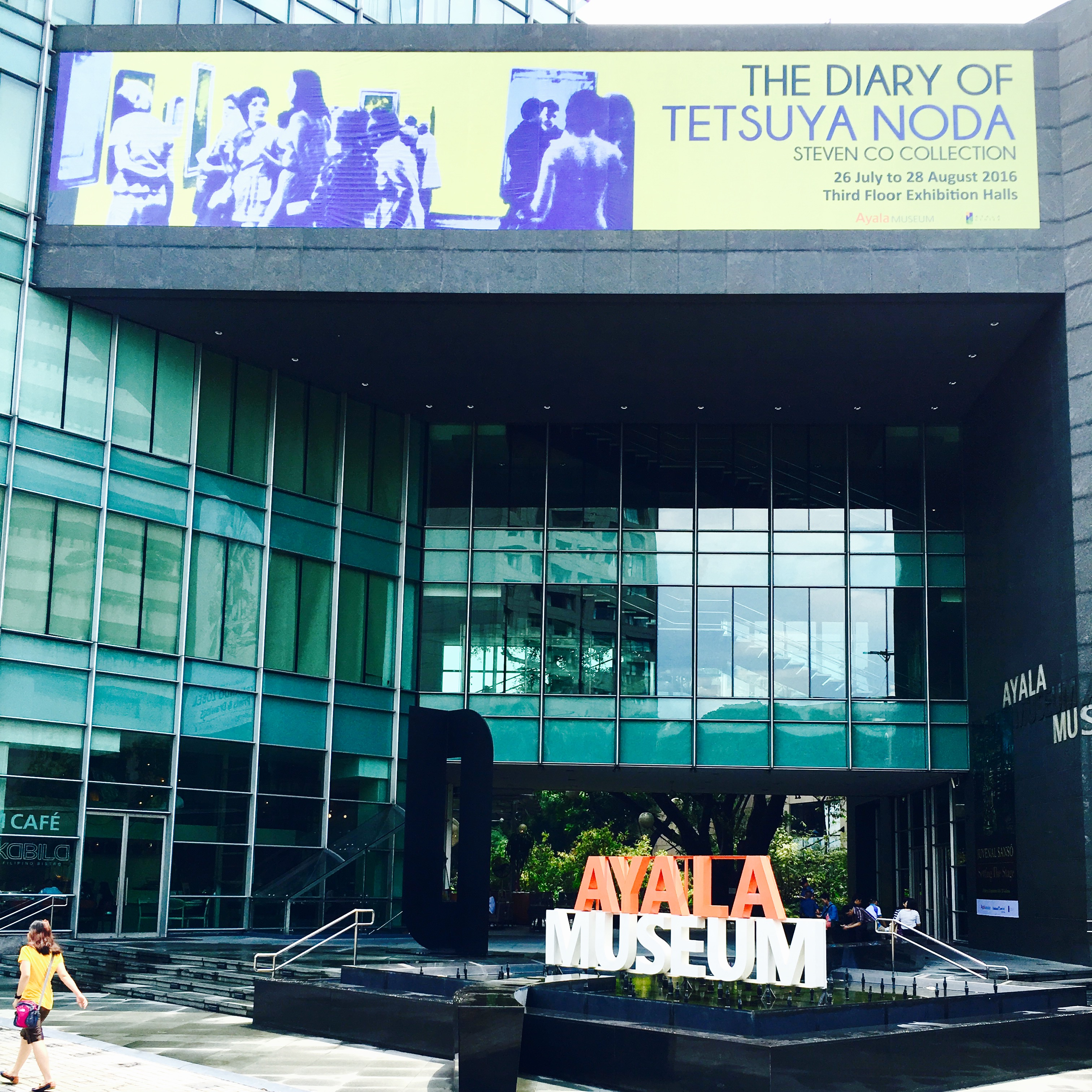
Promotional banner on the exterior of the museum for THE DIARY OF TETSUYA NODA - STEVEN CO COLLECTION at the Ayala Museum from 25 July to 28 August 2016

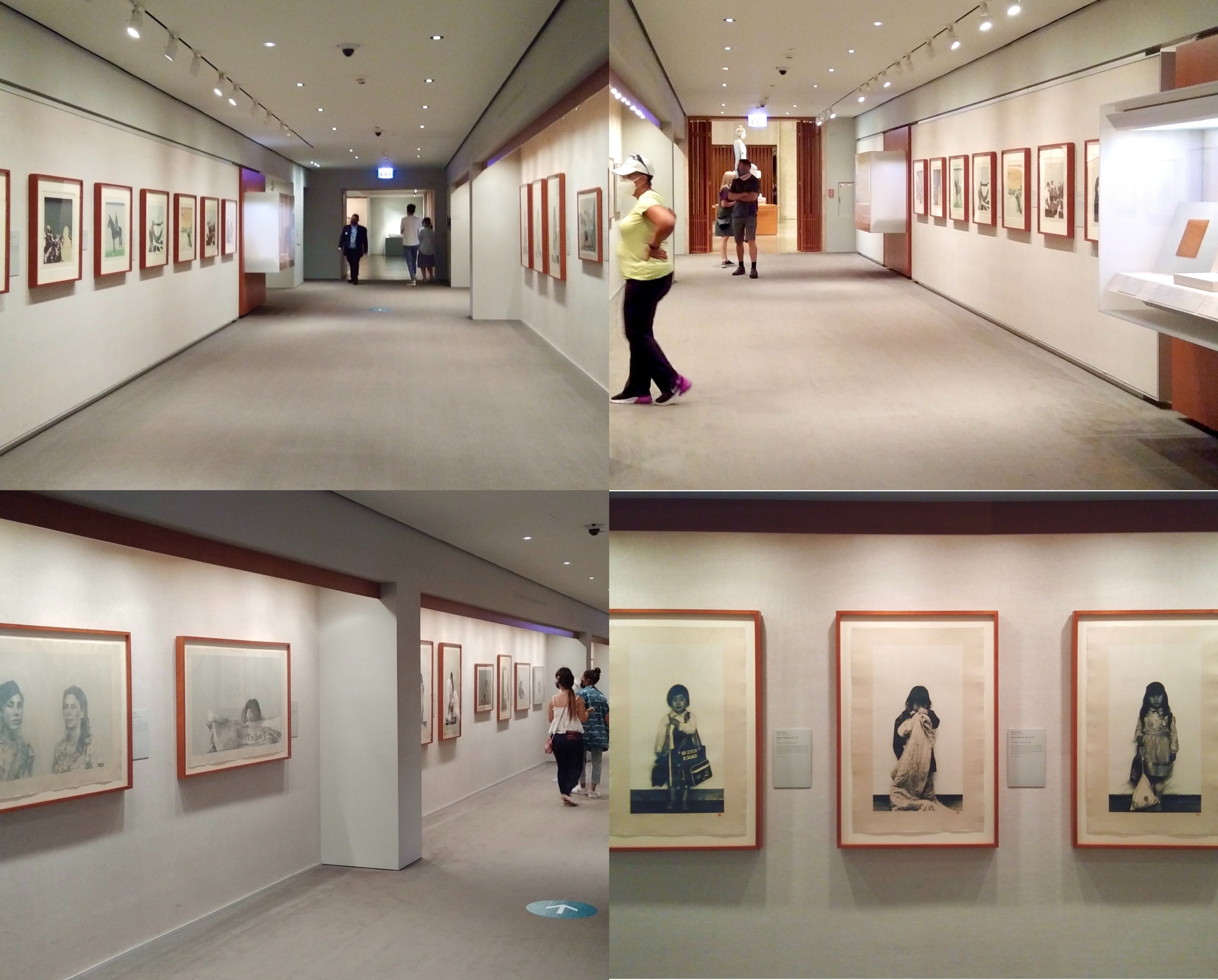
Multiple installation views of NODA TETSUYA: MY LIFE IN PRINT at the Art Institute of Chicago from 29 February to 13 March and 30 July to 16 November 2020

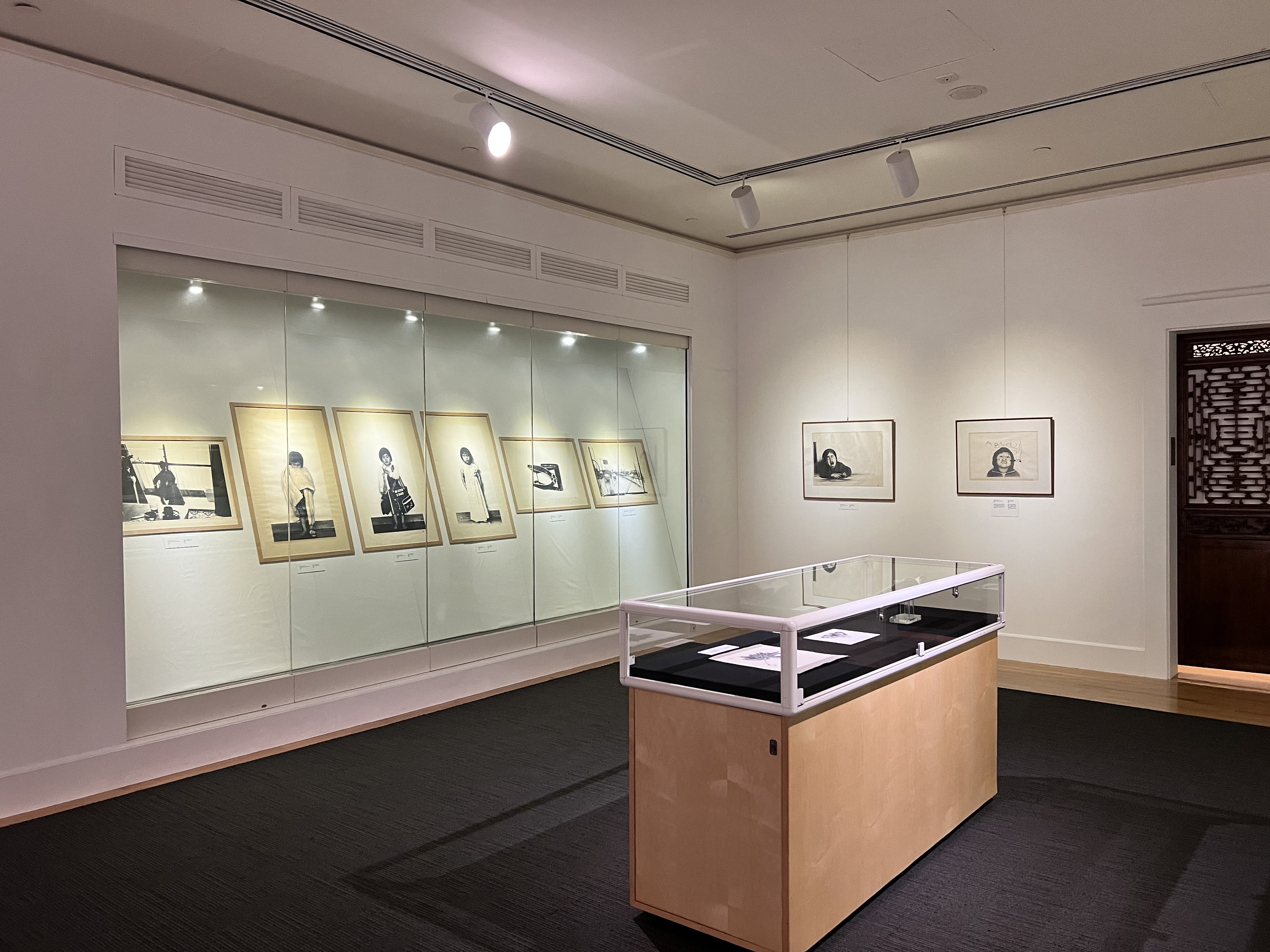
Partial installation view of NODA TETSUYA'S DIARY OF CONTEMPORARY JAPANESE PRINTS at the University Museum and Art Gallery, Hong Kong of the University of Hong Kong from 10 June to 16 October 2022

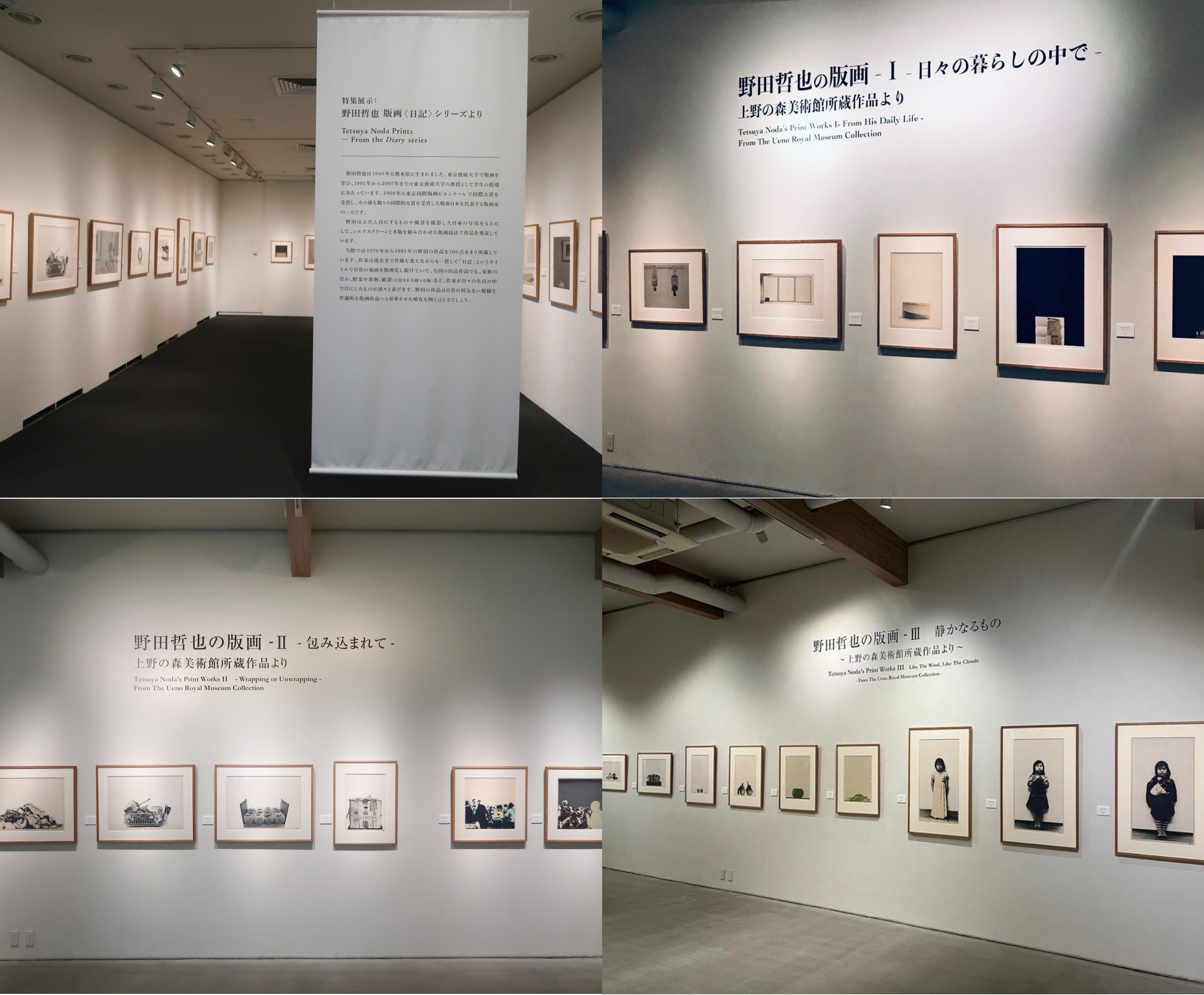
Partial installation views of the 4-year project (2020 – 2023) of The Ueno Royal Museum that started with TETSUYA NODA PRINTS <DIARY> SERIES from 23 July to 10 August (Part 1) and 12 to 30 August (Part 2) in 2020. This was followed by 3 annual thematic exhibitions, namely: TETSUYA NODA’s PRINT WORKS I – FROM HIS DAILY LIFE from 12 to 23 August 2021; TETSUYA NODA’S PRINT WORKS II – WRAPPING OR UNWRAPPING from 19 to 30 August 2022; and TETSUYA NODA’S PRINT WORKS III – LIKE THE WIND, LIKE THE CLOUDS from 10 to 21 August 2023. All works showcased were from The Ueno Royal Museum Collection.

- 1969 (G) Ljubljana International Print Biennale, Yugoslavia
- 1970 (G) British International Print Biennale, United Kingdom
- 1971 (G) Sao Paulo Biennale, Brazil
- 1972 (G) Venice Biennale: Graphic International, Italy
- 1973 (S) Soker-Kaseman Gallery, San Francisco, United States of America
- 1976 (G) Arakawa Shusaka, Ikeda Masuo, Noda Tetsuya (Cincinnati Art Museum), United States of America
- 1976 (G) Frechen International Print Biennale, Germany
- 1978 (S) Fuji Television Gallery, Tokyo, Japan
- 1978 (G) Norwegian International Print Biennale, Norway
- 1979 (S) Foire Internationale d'Art Contemporain, Grand Palais, Paris, France
- 1979 (S) The 13th International Biennial of Graphic Arts - TETSUYA NODA, International Centre of Graphic Arts (Ljubljana)(MGLC), Yugoslavia
- 1979 (G) Contemporary Japanese Art (Beijing & Shanghai), China
- 1979 (S) Soker-Kaseman Gallery, San Francisco, United States of America
- 1980 (S) Ikeda Museum of 20th Century Art, Shizuoka, Japan
- 1980 (S) Marina Dinkler Gallery, Berlin, Germany
- 1980 (G) Printed Art: A View of Two Decades (Museum of Modern Art, New York), United States of America
- 1981 (S) Gallery S. 65, Belgium
- 1981 (G) International Art Biennale, Valparaiso, Chile
- 1983 (S) Gallery 39, London, United Kingdom
- 1983 (G) Japanese Print Since 1900 (British Museum), United Kingdom
- 1984 (S) Tikotin Museum of Japanese Art, Haifa, Israel
- 1985 (G) Japanese Contemporary Art (National Gallery of Modern Art, New Delhi), India
- 1987 (S) Fuji Television Gallery, Japan
- 1988 (S) Old Jim Gallery, Vanderbilt University, United States of America
- 1989 (S) The 18th International Biennial of Graphic Arts - TETSUYA NODA, International Centre of Graphic Arts (Ljubljana)(MGLC), Yugoslavia
- 1990 (S) Australian National University Drill Hall Gallery, Canberra, Australia
- 1990 (G) "Japanese Prints of 20th Century, Reformist and Tradition" (Cincinnati Art Museum)
- 1995 (G) La Serigraphie Au Rendez-Vous (Galerie Dimmers, Bruxelles), Belgium
- 1996 (S) Patrick Cramer, Geneve, Switzerland
- 1996 (S) Don Soker Contemporary Art, San Francisco, United States of America
- 1997 (S) Shiyoda Gallery, Shizuoka, Japan
- 1998 (S) Gallery Goto, Tokyo, Japan
- 1998 (G) Photo Image: Printmaking 60s to 90s (Museum of Fine Arts, Boston), United States of America
- 1999 (S) Gallery Seijo, Sendai, Japan
- 2000 (S) Sakanomachi Museum, Toyama, Japan
- 2001 (S) Museum of Small Dreams, Yonago, Tottori, Japan
- 2001 (S) Aizawa Museum, Niigata, Japan
- 2002 (S) Museum Chiran, Kagoshima, Japan
- 2003 (G) "MOT Annual 2003 - DAYS", Museum of Contemporary Art, Tokyo, Japan
- 2003 (S) "Tetsuya Noda", Central Academy of Fine Arts Museum, Beijing, China
- 2004 (S) "Days in a Life", The Art of Tetsuya Noda, Asian Art Museum, San Francisco, United States of America
- 2005 (S) "Print World of Tetsuya Noda", Uki Municipal Shiranuhi Museum of Art, Kumamoto, Japan
- 2006 (S) "Tetsuya Noda - Diary", Contemporary Center of Graphic Art, Japan
- 2006 (G) "Contemporary Prints, Transformation of Photographic Image"(National Museum of Modern Art, Tokyo), Japan
- 2006 (G) "Connoisseurship of Japanese Prints: Part I" (The Art Institute of Chicago), United States of America
- 2007 (S) "Tetsuya Noda - Diary", University Museum, Tokyo University of the Arts, Japan
- 2008 (S) Ardel Gallery, Bangkok, Thailand
- 2009 (S) Gallery Itsutsuji, Tokyo, Japan
- 2010 (G) Emerging Japanese Print Artists of the 1960s, 70s, and Beyond, The Art Institute of Chicago, United States of America
- 2010 (G) "Contemporary Japanese Printmaking Exhibition" (Zhejiang Art Museum), China
- 2011 (S) Andrew Bae Gallery, Chicago, United States of America
- 2012 (S) "Tetsuya Noda", Museum of Modern Art, Wakayama, Japan
- 2012 (G) "Contemporary Water-Based Woodblock Prints", (Suzhou Museum), China
- 2013 (S) "Print Works by Tetsuya Noda: from the Museum Collection, Kumamoto, Japan
- 2013 (S) "Tetsuya Noda", Hokusai Museum, Kazo, Japan
- 2014 (S) "Noda Tetsuya's 'Diary'", British Museum, United Kingdom
- 2015 (S) "Tetsuya Noda - Diary II", Ardel Gallery of Modern Art, Bangkok, Thailand
- 2016 (S) "Diary of Tetsuya Noda: Steven Co Collection", Ayala Museum, Philippines
- 2017 (G) "Paint By Numbers", Jewish Institute of Religion, New York, United States of America
- 2017 (S) "Tetsuya Noda - Best of 'Diary'", Kashiwa Civic Art Gallery, Japan
- 2017 (G) "Light/Matter: The Intersection of Photography and Printmaking", Grunwald Gallery of Art, Indiana University Bloomington, United States of America
- 2018 (G) "43 Works Reunited", Museo de la Solidaridad Salvador Allende, Santiago, Chile
- 2019 (S) "World According to Tetsuya Noda", Andrew Bae Gallery, Chicago, United States of America
- 2019 (G) "Bientôt déjà hier - Métamorphoses et écoulement du temps", Centre de la Gravure et de l’Image imprimée, La Louvière, Belgium
- 2019 (S) "Tetsuya Noda Exhibition - Retrospective", Gallery Itsutsuji, Tokyo, Japan
- 2019 (S) "Your Hand In Mine - Tetsuya Noda (Diary) Selected Works: Steven Co Collection", organized by Arts Empowering Lab (At Light Gallery), Macau, China
- 2020 (S) "Noda Tetsuya: My Life in Print", The Art Institute of Chicago, United States of America
- 2020 (S) "Tetsuya Noda Print 'Diary' Series", The Ueno Royal Museum, Tokyo, Japan
- 2021 (S) "Tetsuya Noda's Print Works I: From His Daily Life - From The Ueno Royal Museum Collection", Ueno Royal Museum, Tokyo, Japan
- 2021 (G) "Spirit Labor: Duration, Difficulty, and Affect", Garage Museum of Contemporary Art, Moscow, Russia
- 2021-2023 (G) "Human Image: Masterpieces of Figurative Art" (La Imagen Humana: Arte, Identidades Y Simbolismo), in collaboration with the British Museum, La CaixaForum, Madrid, Sevilla, Zaragoza, Palma, Barcelona, Spain
- 2022 (S) "Noda Tetsuya’s Diary of Contemporary Japanese Prints" (Steven Co Collection), University Museum and Art Gallery, The University of Hong Kong, Hong Kong SAR, China
- 2022 (S) "Tetsuya Noda's Print Works II: Wrapping or Unwrapping - From The Ueno Royal Museum Collection", Ueno Royal Museum, Tokyo, Japan
- 2022 (S) "Tetsuya Noda : A Variation of Mimeograph" (Steven Co Collection), Hong Kong Open Printshop, Hong Kong SAR, China
- 2022 (G) "Time Tunnel - Japan and the Jews", Tikotin Museum of Japanese Art, Haifa, Israel
- 2023 (S) "Tetsuya Noda's Print Works III: Like the Wind, Like the Clouds - From The Ueno Royal Museum Collection", Ueno Royal Museum, Tokyo, Japan
- 2024 (S) "'Noda Tetsuya's Diary' Print Exhibition - Steven Co Collection", Qi Fengge Museum of Printmaking History, China Printmaking Museum, China·Guanlan Original Printmaking Base, Shenzhen, China
- 2025 (G) "Three Masters of Contemporary Japanese Printmaking", Echizen Washi Village Paper Culture Museum, Echizen, Fukui, Japan
- 2026 (S) "Tetsuya Noda From the Gallery Collection", Gallery Itsutsuji, Tokyo, Japan

(S) = SOLO EXHIBITION, (G) = GROUP EXHIBITION

== Works ==
In the British Museum Magazine, Timothy Clark, the keeper of Japanese section wrote "In nearly fifty years, Noda has created some 500 further works that continue his mesmerizing ‘Diary’ series, using the unique combination of color woodblock and photo-based silkscreen onto handmade Japanese paper that he has made his own. Personal snapshots are rigorously reworked to become subtle mementos of universal significance: ‘what’s in a life?’ we are constantly prompted to ask."

In the video entitled "Making Beauty: Noda Tetsuya", published by The British Museum on 11 October 2018, Noda and Clark discuss the concept and technique used in achieving the look and feel of the Noda's works. Video on YouTube

=== Concept ===
Since 1968, Noda’s works have been inspired by themes of his own life. It is a visual autobiography and the motif is a comment on his daily life - his family, people he knows, his children’s growth and scenery along his way. He takes photographs of what he sees and likes, then develops and retouches them with pencil or brushes. His works are done using materials close at hand.

On the concept of visual autobiography, Robert Flynn Johnson stated, "To think that one's life is important enough to make it the focus of one's art can be an act of pure folly and egotistical pride or it can involve a humbling and sincere self-examination that draw on observation of small universal truths. It is clear that in a career of nearly forty years of creating an artistic world made at paper and ink, Tetsuya Noda has followed the latter, quieter path."

In the age of social media, some critics are quick to see the parallelism of Noda's visual autobiography and popular social media sites. In 2016, a newspaper pointed out "In this era of social networking, it isn’t unusual for our friends to frequently post photos of the mundane happenings of our lives—a laughing baby, a just-read book, our lunch, a selfie—on Facebook, Instagram, or Snapchat. But for renowned contemporary Japanese artist Tetsuya Noda, documenting the ordinary details of his daily life is something he has done for almost 50 years."

When asked about how he found his theme; "Diary as an opportunity", he replied, "at the university I was not at all satisfied with the assignment of painting nudes, it did not seem the right way to express myself." His independent thinking and determination were highly rewarded. "I started to use a mimeograph cutting machine for the photo images in addition to the woodblock printmaking techniques." In 1968, four years after he graduated from the university, he received the International Grand Prize at the 6th Tokyo International Print Biennale; "for the audacious combination of photography with traditional woodblock print."

=== Development ===
Chieko Tsuzuki of The National Museum of Modern Art, Tokyo described Noda's works as follows, "The diverse expressions of his works up until the mid-1970s, incorporating a myriad of elements and having a slight tendency to be overly explanatory, were gradually narrowed down. In the latter half of the 1970s, his works were centered around a combination of woodcuts and silkscreens. Through this combination, he increasingly produced works that expressed the expansion of space. Specifically, he minimized the use of subject matter; brought out the effect of light and subtle shading; and created a large, empty space on the surface plane, via capturing the subject from a low perspective. Regardless of their minimal images, his works during this period reveal a further deepening of his expression that enriched the viewers' impression and their lingering memory. In the 1980s and the 1990s, such expressions were further developed to depict works with a stronger sense of serenity and lyricism. These works differed from any type of independent painting that became complete via what had been depicted on the plane, or from any talkative kind of painting. Rather, the works of Noda from that era are pictures that utilized printing, with the aim of reaching into the minds and consciousness of the viewers, through their going back and forth between sets of ideas: the usual and the unusual, the individual and the universal, and reality and fiction. The viewer might also perceive a sense of consciousness to interact with the work, an idea which is shared by much of contemporary art."

=== Techniques ===
Each print is created through a unique and multilayered method he himself developed. He begins by selecting a photograph, taken on the day of the title, that he manipulates in various ways. First he adds drawn elements—such as lines or shading—and whites out other aspects of the image. The altered photo is then scanned in an old-fashioned mimeograph machine, a process that creates a stencil of the image. Next Noda takes a sheet of handmade Japanese paper which he uses for all of his prints and applies subtle color through traditional woodblock technique. Finally he silkscreens his manipulated photo over the top and adds his signature, his name along with an inked thumbprint.

=== Photography ===
On the use of photographs, Noda concluded the difference between his approach to photography and that of the Pop artist, "Andy Warhol used photographs of Marilyn Monroe and Jacqueline Onassis (then Kennedy), but notice that the subjects are famous people, and the photographs themselves had already appeared dozens of times in the mass media. I never use photos taken by other people. My photos are all my own." Japanese art critic Yoshiaki Tono (one of the "three greats" of Japanese art criticism) pointed out that "Where the Pop artists are concerned with America, with the iconography of a particular age and culture, with anonymous colloquialisms, Noda deals with something much more personal. His main subject is ordinariness - the ordinariness of individual people. Warhol's "Jackie" is the face of a whole period in American life. Imposed on it is an image of Americana during the convulsive sixties. Noda's 1968 prints are of a different dimension."

=== Education ===
As an educator, April Vollmer, artist and author of "Japanese Woodblock Print Workshop: A Modern Guide to the Ancient Art of Mokuhanga" (2015) wrote, "Today most art training takes place in universities, and two prominent Japanese artists—Tetsuya Noda at Tokyo University of the Arts (Tokyo Geijutsu Daigaku) and Akira Kurosaki at Kyoto Seika University—are largely responsible for the new international wave of Mokuhanga (Woodblock printing in Japan) awareness. Noda headed the woodblock department at Tokyo Geidai from 1991 until his retirement in 2007. Cultural exchange and the promotion of Japanese art forms are both part of the university’s mission, and Noda spearheaded an innovative program in which traditional Ukiyo-e master printers came each year from the Adachi Institute to work with students, providing a link between the traditional workshop system and the modern university. He also nurtured contacts with the West, and his 2004 retrospective at the San Francisco Museum of Asian Art clearly showed the influence of his study of Western art, combining Mokuhanga backgrounds photo-screenprinted scenes of everyday life. In 1998 Noda came to Columbia University’s LeRoy Neiman Center for Print Studies to teach mokuhanga to New York area printmakers. Many of the artists now teaching mokuhanga internationally studied with Noda, including Seiichiro Miida (who has now taken Noda’s place at Tokyo Geidai), Raita Miyadera (also at Tokyo Geidai), Michael Schneider (Austria), Tyler Starr (US), Roslyn Kean (Australia), and others from Turkey to Korea to Pakistan."

== Evaluation ==
Lawrence Smith, formerly Keeper of Japanese Antiquities at The British Museum wrote, "He is a master in at least four artistic genres, all of them closely related to painting. If considered as a printmaker, no Japanese can remotely equal his range of subject… Noda is unquestionably the greatest Japanese printmaker alive. But if considered as a creator of work very close to painting, one has also to ask what living Japanese could be considered his equal… but in my view not one of them can rival his remarkable range of subjects and emotions".

Edward Lucie-Smith, English art critic, curator and broadcaster, on "Japanese artists who have built major international careers", and in the context of Yayoi Kusama’s "distinctively Japanese extension of the Pop sensibility", and Takashi Murakami’s "traditionally Japanese origins of their imagery", situated between them is, "Another well-known Japanese artist who stresses the international, cross-cultural aspect of his work is Tetsuya Noda. Noda’s visual diaries tell the story of his mixed marriage to an Israeli woman, using photo-based imagery. the most obviously Japanese thing about them is their immaculately skillful use of print-making techniques."

Mário Pedrosa, preeminent critic of art, culture, and politics and one of Latin America's most frequently cited public intellectuals, in a letter to Noda, praised, "Since the Bienal (sic) of Prints, when I had the joy of taking contact with your creative work, I always thought of how original and strong was the expression of your art."

Daniel Bell talking about the originality of Noda's prints says, "Noda's distinctiveness lies in three things: the remarkably consistent subject matter of his work, the structure and configurations of his compositions, and the novel techniques, consciously derived from Ukiyo-e, as the means of realizing his intentions."

Robert Flynn Johnson, curator in charge of the Achenbach Foundation for Graphic Arts at the Fine Arts Museums of San Francisco wrote, "it is Tetsuya Noda who stands as the most original, innovative, and thought-provoking Japanese printmaker of his era".

Steven Co, art collector wrote, "Tetsuya Noda’s Diary Series is a visual map of temporal, personal, experiential, and lyrical moments. Noda strives to preserve memory with the objectivity of his camera, but then disrupts the resulting photograph with the subjectivity of his pencils and brushes before committing the memory to a print. As if to ensure that a memory is engraved into his mind, he would repeatedly retreat to that memory with rigor and vigor by personally pulling each print by hand. The result and effect are quiet and understated accounts of memories revisited, reassessed, and repeatedly asserted through this labor-intensive process. Mr. Noda’s works are as much about the process of making them as the pleasingly introspective and sensitive result of a single work or his whole body of works".

Yusuke Nakahara, art critic (one of the "three greats" of Japanese art criticism), wrote on Tetsuya Noda's use of photograph in his works, "Noda has succeeded in capturing the unique quality that had been captured in any other photographic art work before which could only be seen through a camera. This is the special quality that Noda possesses that others have difficulty to realize in their work. That is the recollective quality that a photograph evokes which one must say gives a photograph its unique quality. This recollected quality is none other than the ability that a photograph has, to record an event, that brings out the human emotion, and in Noda's works I feel that these feelings are strongly expressed."

Professor Linda C. Ehrlich, when writing on the relationship of Japanese visual arts and Japanese cinema, stressed not to overlook the influence of the more contemporary "creative print" (sōsaku-hanga) on Japanese films that feature a formalistic playfulness and daringness. Ehrlich stated that, "Noda Tetsuya’s large-scale diary pages based on family photographs, with their seemingly mundane, yet resonant, themes." invokes J. Thomas Rimer’s view on sōsaku-hanga’s sense of "muted realism" and "a sense of craft rooted in instinctive apprehension of the power, the wholeness, of nature itself." And it is this sense of "muted realism," in which "the wholeness of nature and the everyday are joyfully celebrated."

Emmanuel Madec, on his analysis of Tetsuya Noda's work, the photographer and curator wrote, "At first sight, his approach is that of a diarist. In Noda’s case, it is about an enumeration of daily objects, places, events whose banality is counterbalanced by the scale of the works. The status of subjects and objects is reversed. Diary; Feb. 14th '92 shows us an ashtray cluttered with many cigarette butts, which obviously is of great triviality; but the point of view adopted for the photograph makes it graphically remarkable. It is the format of this image (89.6 x 129.5 cm) that gives an aura to this object of which, while so commonplace at first sight, puts it front and centre as a marker of time. The object is now not only an object, it becomes a situation. With Noda, he is first a photographer. Taking pictures serves the need to check on reality. Then, discovering the image always comes from the separation between reality, memory and image, between which we can witness the gaps. But what is most striking here is that the process is transversely extended from engraving and then to screen printing. Extending the photographic image to a second medium is both over-appropriation and over-exploitation of the matter / image to extract possibilities. Noda's images thus pose as hybrids, the fruit of interbreeding between photography and engraving, propitious to probing into the profound essence of existence. Because Tetsuya Noda’s Diary is part of an elaboration of time: time of existence and time of the work that the serial reproduction confirms; therefore a proof and affirmation of the personal history of its author, as imprint of his attempt to take on time."

Joey Ho Chong I, art curator, wrote "Noda's Diary series reminds me of an adapted quote from Qing dynasty poet ZhaWeiren: what used to be the zither, chess, wine and flowers in calligraphy and painting; is now the rice, oil, salt, sauce, vinegar and tea. It is extraordinary that ordinary things in life, under the unique interpretation of Noda, can possess such intelligence and timelessness, making things strange yet intimate. His works allow us to walk through his life and make us feel as if we were part of him or his family. We can silently experience his joys and sorrows, and quietly walk along with him through his life journey. It is his ability to negotiate with that close and distant home in his heart that allows us to understand the meaning of life in the ordinary."

Janice Katz, Associate Curator of Japanese Art at the Art Institute Chicago wrote, "his focus on familiar and personal imagery almost feels like an attempt to stop time. The intensely personal subject matter of his images are in contrast to his printmaking technique, which renders his subjects mysterious and veiled. They are a bit hazy and unclear, creating a distance between the viewer and the image. The loving care that Noda expends on the creation of a print, making it beautiful and detailed, infusing it with mystery and uncertainty, makes me think that he is not preserving memory so much as creating the scene the way it appears in his memory. In the process of creation, he gets to spend more time with each of these moments—the wish of every parent, surely—even as he alters them."

Dr. Florian Knothe, Director of the University Museum and Art Gallery, The University of Hong Kong, wrote "Noda's work is technically accomplished and thematically exceedingly personal. Known for being a representative of the long tradition of printmaking in Japan, and as an innovator for the further development of the long-practiced genre, Noda's work combines photography, traditional Japanese woodblock printing, mimeograph duplication and silkscreen printing in a self-invented and precisely controlled process of layering... Thematically, Noda represents landscapes, domestic scenes and still-lifes, as well as - and more importantly - portraits of himself, family and friends, which are markers of specific moments in time, such as the more recent diary illustrations for March 13th and May 10th, created during the pandemic."

== Public collections ==
Tetsuya Noda's works are widely collected around the world by both generalist museums (national museums, fine art museums, modern art museum and contemporary art museums) and specialist museums (photography, print and graphic art).

- Art Gallery of New South Wales
- Centre de la Gravure et de l'Image imprimée (Belgium)
- Art Gallery of Greater Victoria
- University of Alberta Museums
- Museo de la Solidaridad Salvador Allende, Santiago (Chile)
- Tikotin Museum of Japanese Art, Haifa (Israel)
- National Museum of Modern Art, Tokyo
- National Museum of Modern Art, Kyoto
- National Museum of Art, Osaka
- Tokyo Metropolitan Museum of Photography
- Museum of Contemporary Art, Tokyo
- Museum of Modern Art, Wakayama
- Contemporary Art Museum, Kumamoto
- Ueno Royal Museum, Tokyo
- Gyeonggi Museum of Modern Art (South Korea)
- Muzeum Sztuki in Łódź (Poland)
- The British Museum
- Arts Council of Great Britain
- The Metropolitan Museum of Art, New York
- Museum of Modern Art, New York
- National Museum of Asian Art, Smithsonian Institution
- Museum of Fine Arts, Boston
- The Art Institute of Chicago
- Brooklyn Museum
- Jewish Museum (Manhattan), New York
- Fine Arts Museums of San Francisco
- Los Angeles County Museum of Art
- Asian Art Museum, San Francisco
- Library of Congress
- Cleveland Museum of Art, Ohio
- Des Moines Art Center, Iowa
- Fogg Art Museum, Harvard University
- Georgetown University Library
- Rhode Island School of Design Museum, Rhode Island
- Mead Art Museum at Amherst College
- Jordan Schnitzer Museum of Art, University of Oregon
- Medici Museum of Art
- Smart Museum of Art, University of Chicago
- University of Saint Joseph Art Museum, West Hartford, Connecticut
- Minneapolis Institute of Art, Minnesota
- Samek Art Museum, Pennsylvania

== Books ==
- JAPANESE PRINTS OF THE TWENTIETH CENTURY: IKEDA MASUO, ARAKAWA SHUSAKU, NODA TETSUYA - HOWARD AND CAROLINE PORTER COLLECTION, Kristin L Spangenberg, Cincinnati Museum Association, 1975
- TETSUYA NODA THE WORKS 1964 - 1978, Yoshiaki Tono, Fuji Television Gallery Co., Ltd, 1978
- TETSUYA NODA WORKS 1982 - 1983, Yoshiaki Tono, Fuji Television Gallery Co., Ltd, 1983
- THE WORLD OF TETSUYA NODA: PRINTMAKER'S DIARY, SUMMER 1984 (ʻOlamo shel Ṭeṭsuyah Nodah : yomano shel madpis, ḳayits 1984), Tetsuya Noda, Nehemia Hartuv, Eli Lancman, Pnina Rosenberg, The Tikotin Museum of Japanese Art, 1984
- TETSUYA NODA WORKS 1983 - 1987, Takahiko Okada, Fuji Television Gallery Co., Ltd, 1987
- TETSUYA NODA THE WORKS II 1978 - 1992, Yusuke Nakahara, Fuji Television Gallery Co., Ltd, 1992
- TETSUYA NODA THE WORKS III 1992 - 2000, Daniel Bell, Fuji Television Gallery Co., Ltd, 2001
- DAYS IN A LIFE: THE ART OF TETSUYA NODA, Robert Flynn Johnson, Asian Art Museum – Chong-Moon Lee Center for Asian Art and Culture (San Francisco, United States), 2004 ISBN 978-0939117222
- TETSUYA NODA THE WORKS IV 1999 - 2005, Robert Flynn Johnson, Fuji Television Gallery Co., Ltd, 2005
- TETSUYA NODA: DIARY, Hideyuki Kido, Center for Contemporary Graphic Art, 2006
- TETSUYA NODA COMPLETE WORKS V 2006 - 2013, Lawrence Smith, Andrew Bae Gallery, 2014
- TETSUYA NODA THE WORKS 1964 - 2016, Tetsuya Noda, Yoshiaki Tono, Yusuke Nakahara, Daniel Bell, Robert Flynn Johnson, Lawrence Smith, Abe Publishing, 2016 ISBN 978-4872424300
- THE DIARY OF TETSUYA NODA: STEVEN CO COLLECTION, Ditas R. Samson, Steven Co, Tadayoshi Nakabayashi (中林忠良), Ayala Foundation, 2016 ISBN 978-6218028036
- PAINT BY NUMBER, David Adelson, Laura Kruger, Wendy Zierler, Adriane Leveen, Hebrew Union College - Jewish Institute of Religion, 2016 ISBN 1-884300-53-7
- YOUR HAND IN MINE, TETSUYA NODA (DIARY) SELECTED WORKS - STEVEN CO COLLECTION, Joey Ho Chong I, Steven Co, Arts Empowering Lab, 2019 ISBN 978-99981-914-2-6
- STONES FROM OTHER MOUNTAINS - 2020 INTERNATIONAL OUTSTANDING PRINTMAKING ARTISTS' WORKS COLLECTION, Li Kang, Alicia Candiani, Peter Bosteels, Davida Kidd, Michel Barzin, Orit Hofshi, Ovidiu Petca, Heilongjiang Fine Arts Publishing House, 2020 ISBN 978-7-5593-6445-6
- LA IMAGEN HUMANA - ARTE, IDENTIDADES Y SIMBOLISMO, Fundación La Caixa, 2021 ISBN 978-84990-029-4-1
- TETSUYA NODA: A VARIATION OF MIMEOGRAPH - Steven Co Collection, Yung Sau-mui, Steven Co, Hong Kong Open Printshop, 2022 ISBN 978-988-77335-6-0
- NODA TETSUYA'S DIARY OF CONTEMPORARY JAPANESE PRINTS - Steven Co Collection, Florian Knothe, Kuldip Kaur Singh, Steven Co, University Museum and Art Gallery, The University of Hong Kong, 2023 ISBN 978-988-74707-93
- TETSUYA NODA'S PRINT WORKS 1970 - 1981 FROM THE UENO ROYAL MUSEUM, Tetsuya Noda, Takashi Okazato, Chieko Tsuzuki, Akemi Sakamoto, Michiyasu Itsutsuji, Mamoru Watanabe, The Ueno Royal Museum / The Japan Art Association, 2023

== In popular culture ==
- Noda's work "Diary: Aug 22nd '68" became the cover of Volume 2 1969 issue of La Gravure (季刊版画), a Japanese magazine on print art.
- Noda's work "Diary: Perhaps Sept. 15th last year" appeared as an ad for Xerox's "Men & Civilization" (人間と文明) campaign in 1970.
- Noda appeared in an ad for the motorcycle model called Bobby for the Yamaha Motor Co., Ltd.'s in 1976.
- Noda's work "Diary: April 7th '75" became the poster for Amnesty International Japanese Section in the 80's.
- Noda's work "Diary: Aug 22nd '68" became the cover of Autumn 1990 issue of The Wilson Quarterly, a magazine published by the Woodrow Wilson International Center for Scholars in Washington, D.C.
- Noda's work "Diary: Sept. 2nd '05, in Weed, California" became the cover of Volume 134 2006 issue of Hanga Deijutsu (版畫芸術), a Japanese magazine on print art. ISBN 4872422341
- Zooming in Togliattigrad, an Italian indie band, in their self-titled EP (2015), included a track entitled 野田 哲也 (Noda Tetsuya). The inspiration came when the members (Carlo Maria Toller, Andrea Marazzi and Lorenzo Firmi) saw Noda’s retrospective show at The British Museum. On same EP, the band uses one of Noda's work entitled, "Diary: Sept. 1st '74" for its cover. In 2016, the band was invited to provide a soundtrack to accompany the exhibit The Diary of Tetsuya Noda. The track entitled The Diary of Tetsuya Noda runs 52:49 minutes. In the same year, British artist Feea produced a remix of 野田 哲也 (Noda Tetsuya).
- Noda's work "Diary: Aug. 4th '74" became the cover of the English edition of Mieko Kawakami's novel Sisters in Yellow published by Picador in 2026. ISBN 9781035024131
