= Guy de Rougemont =

French sculptor and painter (1935–2021)

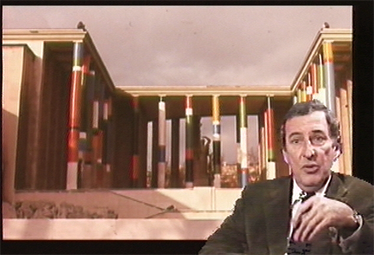
- de Rougemont in 1995
- Born: Guy du Temple de Rougemont; 23 April 1935; Paris, France
- Died: 18 August 2021 (aged 86); Montpellier, France
- Occupations: Sculptor, painter

Guy du Temple de Rougemont, known as Guy de Rougemont, born 23 April 1935 in Paris and died 19 August 2021 in Montpellier, was a French painter, watercolourist, draughtsman and sculptor who spent much of his life between Paris and Marsillargues, in the south of France.

A multi-disciplinary artist, he sought to remove the boundaries between the arts, particularly between sculpture and painting, and worked in everyday places, squares and streets, as well as creating objects and furniture. His famous works include his Cloud table (1970), designed for the interior designer Henri Samuel, his Mise en couleurs d'un musée (1974), a temporary artistic intervention during which he covered the columns of the Musée d'art Moderne de la Ville de Paris with strips of coloured PVC, and his Environnement pour une autoroute, in which he installed urban sculptures over 30 km along the La Veuve-Sainte Ménéhould section of the A4 motorway, France (1977).

A member of the Académie des Beaux-Arts, he was the son of General Jean-Louis du Temple de Rougemont.

== Childhood and family ==
Guy du Temple de Rougemont was born on 23 April 1935 in Paris. His father, Jean-Louis du Temple de Rougemont, was a Cavalry Officer. His mother, Louise Marie Cécile Lejeune, was descended on her father's side from General Baron Lejeune, a battle painter. Guy de Rougemont was the eldest of five children. His brother, François de Rougemont, is a civil engineer and a graduate of Harvard Business School. His sister, Cécile Marie Edith du Temple de Rougemont, Duchess of Lorges, was a pupil of André Chastel at the Institut d'Histoire de l'Art and helped him discover Florence, guided by the illustrious art historian himself. His second sister, Laure, Princesse de Beauvau Craon, was President of Sotheby's in France. Lastly, her younger sister, Anne de Rougemont, was Aimé Maeght's assistant, then attached to the I.C.O.M, and a member of the Association des Amis du Musée Georges Pompidou, before becoming assistant to Madame David-Weill, President of the Union des Arts Décoratifs, a union itself created by Mr Taigny, great-grandfather of Madame Louise Lejeune, the artist's mother.

== Early life ==
Guy de Rougemont was exposed to art from an early age, as his paternal American grandmother introduced him to watercolours in his childhood. After the Second World War, Jean-Louis du Temple de Rougemont was appointed deputy military attaché in Great Britain. Guy de Rougemont spent his holidays there, which gave him the opportunity to visit London museums. He spent five years at boarding school in Normandy, at the Roches Normandie school. In 1957, his father was appointed to the Pentagon as part of the Atlantic Pact, so the whole family moved to Washington for a year, where Guy de Rougemont attended an American school and exhibited his first watercolours. He completed his education at the Cours Bergson in Paris. In 1953, he studied at the École Nationale Supérieure des Arts Décoratifs (ENSAD), in the studio of the painter Bernard Cathelin (1919–2004), rue de la Grande Chaumière. He was admitted to the Arts-Déco in Paris on the 24th of May, 1954 and studied painting - notably in Marcel Gromaire's studio - and soon took part in his first exhibitions, initially abroad. In 1962, he presented his paintings at the d'Arcy Galleries in New York, then at the Ateneo Mercantil gallery in Valencia in 1964. From 1962 to 1964, he studied at the Casa de Velázquez in Madrid on a state scholarship, where he made friends with Jean Canavaggio. He took part at Paris Biennial in 1965 and at the Salon de Mai in 1966, at the invitation of the painter Jean Messagier. He spent 1965 in New York, staying with his friends Jean and Irène Amic, where he met young artists from the New York scene such as Andy Warhol, Robert Indiana and Frank Stella. He was introduced to large-format acrylic painting, and came to appreciate the power of simplified, uncluttered forms and the power of solid colour. His work is often equated with the Pop Art and Minimalism movements, whose forms he draws inspiration from, without claiming to be his own. Arnaud d'Hauterives, Permanent Secretary of the Institut de France, recalled this seminal trip when Guy de Rougemont was received under the dome a few decades later: "This trip will be a revelation for you; you will receive the 'real lesson' of the great French painters you admire, Léger, Matisse, Bonnard, seen through a different eye, in other words, decanted from all appearances. "

== Work ==
=== Geometric abstraction from 1965 onwards ===
After his return from New York, Guy de Rougemont radically changed his artistic practice. From then on, four main periods can be outlined in his career, defined on the basis of the geometric forms he used to compose his works. In 1965, he introduced the ellipse, which he developed on the surface of his canvas. In 1967, at the request of his friend Gérard Gaveau, head of advertising for Fiat cars, he created his first environment in the Fiat hall on the Champs-Élysées in Paris. He placed canvases cut out in the shape of ellipses in the exhibition space, creating a dialogue between art and cars. Following this event, he created his first volume objects. During the 1970s, he used the cylinder, a geometric shape that he saw as the perfect combination of circles and lines. He used it to place his polychrome volumes in space, creating large cylinders, also known as "totems", "columns" or "beacons", which he placed in urban spaces, such as the Place Albert Thomas in Villeurbanne, or in indoor spaces, with smaller sculptures. The Mise en couleurs d'un musée, at the Musée d'Art moderne de la Ville de Paris in 1974, marked the apogee of his use of the cylinder. The artist ephemerally covered the twenty columns of the museum's portico with coloured PVC, playing with boundaries and placing his work between interior and exterior, on the museum's forecourt. At the end of the decade, and particularly during the 1980s, the artist set aside the cylinder in favour of the screened surface. He produced one of his major works in 1986, the coloured marble mosaic that adorned the pavement of the Bellechasse forecourt, in front of the Musée d'Orsay. Finally, from the 2000s until the end of his life, the artist deployed the serpentine line, marking a return to the use of curved forms.

=== Urban sculptures and installations ===
His many projects include the Saint-Louis hospital, the Marne-la-Vallée RER station, the Musée d'Orsay forecourt, the Hakone Open Air Museum in Japan, the Place Albert-Thomas in Villeurbanne, the Hofgarten in Bonn, the Quito metropolitan park in Ecuador, the Nanterre Hospital, where he created a 300-metre-long mural, the sculptures on the A4 motorway between Châlon-en-Champagne and Sainte-Ménéhould, and the 140-metre-long carpet-paving comprising 28 types of coloured marble, known as "le grand ruban " in the Pierre Beregovoy hall of the Colbert building at the French Ministry of Finance in the Bercy district (Paris 12e). Numerous monumental sculptures were also commissioned for private collections in Dubai, Marrakech and Majorca, among other places.

=== Graphic work ===
Guy de Rougemont is a painter and lithographer. During his trip to New York, Guy de Rougemont also learnt the technique of screen printing, originally used by Americans to mark crates of goods using the stencil system, which was later taken up by artists for their graphic research. One of these artists was Andy Warhol, whom Guy de Rougemont met through his flatmate in New York, the painter Marisol. On his return to France, Guy de Rougemont produced a number of silkscreen prints. At the time of the events of May 1968, he was one of the figures who introduced the practice of screen printing to France, at the Atelier populaire des beaux-arts. In 1988, he told Laurent Gervereau how this happened: "On 14 May, it must have been half past nine, ten o'clock in the evening. I came home and there was a general meeting. At this general meeting, I recognised a number of my painter friends who spotted me and waved to me. The Beaux-Arts lithography workshop is printing a poster [...] I speak up and say that I know a quick, easy, inexpensive way of doing it... And my comrades, my friends, make me take responsibility. They say to me: "That's great, now that you know that, tomorrow morning you can bring us the equipment and we can start a silk-screen printing workshop... ". This is how he became the technician at the Atelier Populaire des beaux-arts, but he always maintained that he had not designed any posters himself. For several years, he shared his studio in the Marais, rue des Quatre Fils, in Paris, with his friend Éric Seydoux, with whom he produced silkscreens for other artists and for various social events.

=== Objects and furniture ===
Guy de Rougemont was also a furniture designer. In 1969, for his exhibition at the Suzy Langlois gallery in Paris, he presented his first cardboard "Volumes" and created his first carpet, known as the Tapis de forme libre, which marked the beginning of his research into the third dimension. In 1970, he designed his famous Nuage table ("Cloud" coffee table, in English) for the decorator Henri Samuel, and the same year, he created a cloud-lamp and various utilitarian objects, such as a place mat, with the Galerie Germain in Paris. In 1974, he collaborated with the Manufacture des Gobelins, for whom he created a tapestry, intitled Les 7 Piliers de la sagesse, presented at the 1977 Lausanne Tapestry Biennial.

From the 1980s onwards, he published several sets of furniture with Artcurial: the Transparences furniture, the Mobilier Diderot in 1986 and the Mobilier Du Deffand in 1989, in homage to Madame du Deffand, the famous 18th-century letter-writer who, three centuries earlier, had lived and held her literary Salon in the artist's studio on rue des Quatre-Fils.

== Last years ==
Widowed to actress Anne-Marie Deschodt, he lived mainly in Marsillargues during his final years. He continued to collaborate with the Diane de Polignac gallery in Paris, with whom he produced furniture pieces and exhibitions, as well as with the Galerie du Passage, where he exhibited for the last time in 2017.

== Recognition and posterity ==
A member of the Institut of France, he was elected to the Académie des Beaux-Arts, painting section, on the 17th of December, 1997 in the chair of Jean Bertholle. He was Commander of the Ordre des Arts et des Lettres.

In 2022, he had an exhibition entitled "Hommage à Guy de Rougemont " at the Centre Bouvet-Ladubay in Saumur (Loire Valley), organised with the participation of the Diane de Polignac gallery. His works can also be found in major collections, including the Musée d'Art Moderne in Paris, the Musée des Arts Décoratifs, the Musée Internationale de la Résistance Salvador Allende (Santiago, Chile), the Centre National des Arts Plastiques and the Musée d'Art Moderne et Contemporain in Saint-Étienne.

In the summer of 2024, the artist will once again be honoured with a solo exhibition entitled ‘Incursion dans l'atelier de Rougemont’ at the Pavillon de la Comtesse de Caen in Paris, an exhibition space supervised by the Académie des Beaux-Arts and belonging to the Institut de France. Simultaneously with the exhibition, Norma published the first major monograph devoted to Guy de Rougemont, written by Gay Gassmann, with contributions from Julio Le Parc, Adrien Goetz, Pierre Passebon, Jacques Grange, Diane de Polignac, Hervé Lemoine and Julie Goy. From April to August 2025, the Polaris Art Centre in Istres will showcase Guy de Rougemont's work at the heart of the Magnificence Rougemont exhibition, alongside works by Vincent Bioulès, Claude Viallat, Lucio Fanti and Pierre Bendine Boucar.

Guy de Rougemont had no children. The joint estate formed by his heirs - his brother, his sister Anne and his nephews - is managed by his nephew Laurent de Rougemont and his wife Sophie de Rougemont. Since 2024, Guy de Rougemont's estate has been represented by the Ketabi-Bourdet gallery in Paris, which showed his work in a first solo exhibition entitled ‘Guy de Rougemont, peintre avant tout’ (Guy de Rougemont, painter above all) in October 2024, then at international art and design fairs (TEFAF Maastricht, Maze Design Basel, Frieze Masters London).

Since 2023, the official online "catalogue raisonné" of Guy de Rougemont—an online scholarly project led by the Guy de Rougemont Fund in collaboration with art historian Julie Goy—has been in progress. The project’s mission is to catalog the works created by the artist from 1954 to 2021. It contributes to the understanding and dissemination of his work by providing a comprehensive overview of the artist’s creative output and the techniques he experimented with.

== Exhibitions ==
=== Solo and group exhibitions (selection) ===
- Solo exhibition, Galerie Suzy Langlois, Paris, 1969.
- Group exhibitions, Galerie Karl Flinker, Paris, 1965, 1980.
- Solo exhibitions, Galerie Cupillard, Grenoble, 1974, 1983.
- Solo exhibitions, Galerie Pascal Gabert, Paris, 1987, 1992, 2005, 2007.
- Solo exhibition, Galerie Gamarra y Garrigues, Madrid, 1988, 1989 (FIAC), 1990 (ARCO collective).
- Solo and group exhibition, Galerie Maeght, Paris and Barcelona, 1998, 1999.
- Retrospective Rougemont at the Musée d'Art Moderne de la Ville de Paris, Paris, 1974.
- Retrospective, Rougemont, Espaces publics et Arts décoratifs 1965-1990, at the Musée des Arts décoratifs, Paris, from 22 May to 19 August 1990. On this occasion, texts by Yvonne Brunehammer, Daniel Marchesseau, Bernard Chapuis and Bernard Minoret were published in the exhibition catalogue.
- Solo exhibitions, Galerie du Passage, Paris, 2003, 2010, 2017.
- Solo exhibition, Tribute to Guy de Rougemont, Centre Bouvet-Ladubay, Saumur, 2022.
- Solo exhibition, Incursion into Rougemont's studio, Pavillon de la Comtesse de Caen, Paris, 2024.
- Solo exhibition, Guy de Rougemont, Painter Above All Else, Galerie Ketabi-Bourdet, Paris, 2024.
- Group exhibition, Magnificence Rougemont, Centre d'art Polaris, Istres, 2025.
- Solo exhibition, Guy de Rougemont, La Ligne Serpentine, Galerie Ketabi-Bourdet, Paris, 2026.

=== Participation in fairs and exhibitions ===
- Salon de Mai, Paris, 1966
- Salon de Mai, Havana, 1967
- Salon de la Jeune Peinture, Paris, 1968, 1969, 1970, 1971
- Biennale Internationale de l'Estampe, Paris, 1968
- Tokyo Print Biennial, 1969
- Salon des Réalités Nouvelles, Paris, 1970
- Salon Grands et Jeunes d'Aujourd'hui, Paris, 1975, 1976, 1977
- Lausanne Tapestry Biennial, 1977, 1979
- Salon de Montrouge, 1980, 1981, 1982, 1983, 1987
- Salon des Artistes Décorateurs, 1985
- Retrospective, Pavillon des Arts et du Design (PAD) Tuileries, Paris, Galerie Diane de Polignac, 2013
- Rétrospective, TEFAF, Maastricht, Galerie Ketabi-Bourdet, 2025.
- Rétrospective, Frieze Masters, Londres, 2026.
