= Dafina (disambiguation) =

Dafina may refer to:

- Dafina, also known as cholent or hamin, a traditional Jewish stew
- Dafina Books, an imprint of Kensington Books

== People ==
- Dafina Zeqiri, Kosovo-Albanian singer-songwriter
- Dafina Zeqiri (composer), Kosovo-Albanian composer of orchestral, chamber, and choral music
- Dafina Memedov, Albanian football midfielder

== See also ==
- Davina (disambiguation)
