= Musée d'art moderne et d'art contemporain =

Art museum in Nice, France

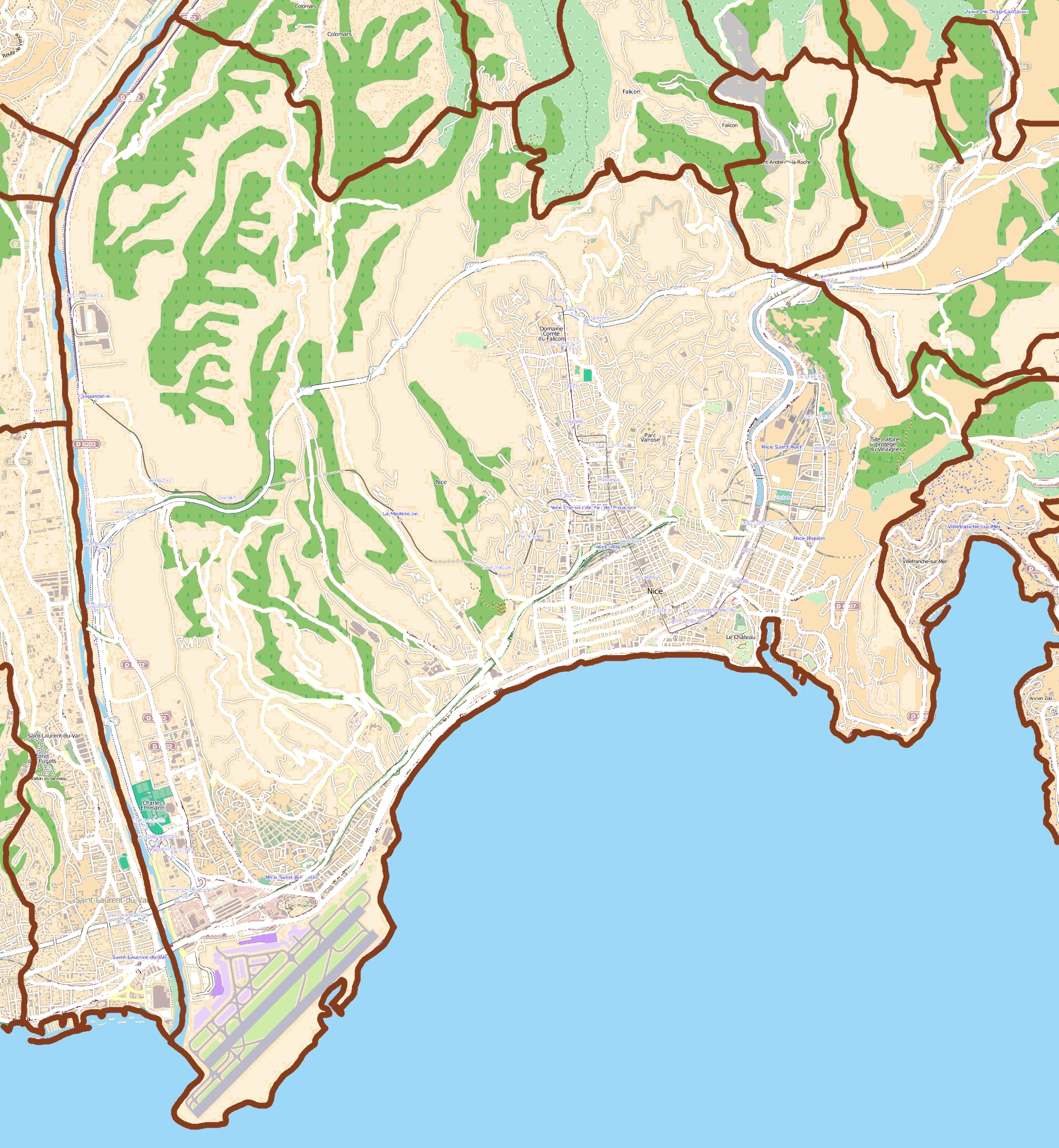
- Location within Nice
- Established: 21 June 1990
- Location: Place Yves Klein - 06364 Nice cedex 4 FRANCE
- Coordinates: 43°42′05″N 7°16′43″E
- Type: Art museum
- Visitors: 135714 per year (2012)
- Website: www.mamac-nice.org

The Musée d'art moderne et d'art contemporain (Museum of Modern and Contemporary Art), also known as MAMAC, is a museum dedicated to modern art and contemporary art. It opened on 21 June 1990, in Nice, France.

== Location ==
The Museum is located near the Place Garibaldi. It was designed by two architects, Yves Bayard and Henri Vidal, and is shaped as a tetrapod arch straddling the course of the Paillon. The monumentality of the project developed to cross the Paillon allows connection through a terrace, called the Promenade des Arts, from the Museum to the Theater. With its square plan, the architecture of the building is inspired by neo-classicism rules. The available area is approximately 4,500 m2, distributed over ten showrooms. The facades are covered with smooth white Carrara marble. The entrance and the shop are located at the level of the esplanade Niki de Saint Phalle, which overlooks the Place Yves Klein. The gallery spaces are devoted to temporary exhibitions on the first floor, and the permanent collections are on the second and third floors. The entrance is free and opens daily from 10.00 am to 6:00 pm, except on Mondays and some holidays.

== Collections ==
The collections present an overview of the artistic creations considered as avant-garde, from the late 1950s to today, which belong to different movements:

- The European New Realists with Arman, Yves Klein, and Martial Raysse, alongside César Baldaccini, Christo, Niki de Saint Phalle, Mimmo Rotella, François Dufrêne, Jean Tinguely, Gérard Deschamps, Daniel Spoerri, Raymond Hains, and Jacques Villeglé
- American Pop art is represented by a collection of works by Roy Lichtenstein, Robert Indiana, Andy Warhol, James Rosenquist, Claes Oldenburg, Tom Wesselmann, and neo-Dadaist assemblages of Rauschenberg
- The School of Nice: Ben Vautier, Sacha Sosno and Robert Malaval is close to several representative works of Fluxus
- The Arte Povera includes artists such as Pier Paolo Calzolari, Michelangelo Pistoletto, Enrica Borghi, and Luciano Fabro
- Supports and Surfaces are represented through Noel Dolla, Marcel Alocco, André-Pierre Arnal, Louis Cane, Daniel Dezeuze, Vincent Bouliès, Marcel Devade, Christian Jaccard, Claude Pagès, and Claude Viallat
- The American minimalism and color field is shown with Morris Louis, Kenneth Noland, Jules Olitski, Ellsworth Kelly, Larry Poons, and Frank Stella.

== Donations and deposits ==
Since the opening, Yves Klein has a room which displays approximately twenty of his works, several of them belonging to the permanent collection of the museum.

In October 2001, Niki de Saint Phalle bequeathed a large part of her collection to the city of Nice for the museum. The donation consists of 170 works including 63 paintings and sculptures, 18 prints, 40 lithographs, serigraphs, and 54 many original documents.

In 2004, artist Albert Chubac gave a hundred works to the Museum.

In 2010, the collector Khalil Nahoul offered 94 art pieces (paintings, drawings, prints).

== Temporary exhibitions ==
Since the opening of the Museum on June 21, 1990, over 213 exhibitions have been presented.

- 3 exhibitions are actually running (May 2013)
- 8 exhibitions were shown at the Galerie des Ponchettes
- 34 exhibitions were shown in the display cabinet
- 89 exhibitions were shown at the Museum's Galery
- 79 exhibitions were shown in the Museum

== Bibliography ==
- Musée d'art moderne et d'art contemporain, Éditions des Arts graphiques, Nice, 1997 (ISBN 2901412785)
