= Claude Viallat =

French contemporary painter (born 1936)

Claude Viallat (born 1936) is a French contemporary painter.

== Biography ==
Born in Nîmes, Viallat grew up in Aubais, a French village with a strong bull-rearing tradition. In 1955, he joined the École des Beaux-Arts (Fine Arts School) in Montpellier, where he met André-Pierre Arnal, Vincent Bioulès, Daniel Dezeuze, Toni Grand, François Rouan, and Henriette Pous, whom he married in 1962.

After doing his military service in Algeria from 1958 to 1961, he joined the École Nationale Supérieure des Beaux-Arts (the National Fine Arts School) of Paris, where he met fellow students Joël Kermarrec, Pierre Buraglio, and Michel Parmentier. He discovered American art in Paris, notably the works of Kenneth Noland, Morris Louis, Sam Francis, and Mark Rothko. By 1963 he had become attracted to abstraction. He was appointed as a teacher in the École des Arts Décoratifs (Decorative Arts School) of Nice in 1964 and decided to create a new formal language questioning the conventions of classical painting. He then started working systematically with one shape affixed on canvas without stretchers. His first personal exhibition took place at Nice's Galerie A in 1966. He also participated in several collective exhibitions that year.

In 1967, he was appointed as a teacher in the École des Beaux-Arts (School of Fine Arts) in Limoges, where he met Raoul Hausmann. In 1968, in Paris, Viallat had his first personal exhibition at the gallery led by Jean Fournier – who remained his gallerist for nearly thirty years. He then participated in an exhibition that arguably originated the “Support/Surfaces” movement at the ARC, in the Modern Art Museum of Paris. His works were in most of the exhibitions of the movement from 1969 to 1971. Although he initiated this group and influenced it aesthetically through his pictorial works, he resigned on May 3, 1971, as he disagreed with the political and theoretical orientations imposed by Louis Cane and Marc Devade.

In 1972, during his first trip to the United States, he discovered Jackson Pollock's paintings and the art of Native Americans. The same year, he participated in the “Amsterdam-Düsseldorf-Paris” exhibition at the Solomon R. Guggenheim Museum of New York, and the “Douze Ans d'Art Contemporain en France” exhibition (Twelve Years of Contemporary Art in France) at the Grand Palais in Paris.

In 1973, he was appointed as an instructor at the École des Beaux-Arts (the Fine Arts School) of Luminy (located at avenue de Luminy, in Marseille), and moved to Marseille. In 1974, the first ever Viallat exhibition in a museum was organised in Saint-Étienne's Musée d'Art et d'Industrie (Museum of Art and Industry). In 1979, Viallat became director of the École des Beaux-Arts (Fine Arts School) of Nîmes. He started collecting objects related to bulls. His collection was the starting point of the Musée des Cultures Taurines (Museum of Bull Tradition) of Nîmes, opened in 1986.

The Centre National d'Art et de Culture Georges Pompidou (the National Modern Art Museum of Paris) hosted a Viallat retrospective in 1982. He represented France at the Venice Biennial in 1988. The same year, he made the stained-glass windows of the Gothic Choir in Nevers Cathedral. In 1991, he became a teacher at the École Nationale Supérieure des Beaux-Arts (National Fine Arts School) of Paris and participated in the Supports/Surfaces historical and retrospective exhibition at the Musée d'Art Moderne (Modern Art Museum) of Saint-Étienne. In 2006, he was awarded with the Fine Arts Academy's Fondation Simone et Cino del Duca (Simone and Cino Del Duca Foundation) prize for painting .

In France he has been represented by Galerie Daniel Templon Paris/Brussels since 1998 and by Ceysson & Bénétière (Paris, Saint-Étienne). Viallat is also represented internationally in Tokyo by Gallery Itsutsuji and in New York by Ceysson & Bénétière.
