= Anne-Marie Deschodt =

French actress and writer

Anne-Marie Deschodt, married name de Rougemont (18 August 1938, Paris – 21 September 2014, Marsillargues), was a French actress and writer.

She was writer Éric Deschodt's sister.

Her first husband was Giancarlo Uzielli, and then, from 1965 to 1967, she was married to French film director Louis Malle. From the 1980s, she was the wife of artist Guy du Temple de Rougemont.

She died at 76 years old.

== Filmography ==
=== Cinema ===
- 1969: La Pince à ongles (Short, by Jean-Claude Carrière) - Marie-Claude
- 1973: The Discreet Charm of the Bourgeoisie (by Luis Buñuel)
- 1973: Shock Treatment (by Alain Jessua) - Lise de Riberolle
- 1974: The Phantom of Liberty (by Luis Buñuel) - Édith Rosenblum
- 1974: La Jeune Fille assassinée (by Roger Vadim) - Éliane
- 1976: Jamais plus toujours (by Yannick Bellon) - l'inconnue
- 1976: Game of Seduction (by Roger Vadim) - La duchesse de Volnay
- 1977: Sorcerer (by William Friedkin) - Blanche
- 1978: La Jument vapeur (by Joyce Buñuel)
- 1978: Utopia by Iradj Azimi - Catherine

=== Television ===
- 1976: Les Cinq Dernières Minutes (téléfilm, Le pied à l'étrier, by Claude Loursais) - Barbara
- 1978: Cinéma 16 (telefilm, La femme rompue, by Josée Dayan) - Noëllie Guérard
- 1981: La Double Vie de Théophraste Longuet (by Yannick Andréi, mini-serial) - L'assistante d'Eliphas (final film role)

== Works ==
- 1978: Les Belles Années, cowritten with Anne-Marie Cazalis, novel, Mercure de France
- 1979: Mariano Fortuny : un magicien de Venise, éditions du Regard
