= Éric Deschodt =

French journalist, writer and translator

Éric Deschodt (born 30 March 1937) is a French journalist, writer and translator. He wrote police novels under the pseudonym Bernard-Paul Lallier.

== Biography ==
Éric Deschodt was Anne-Marie Deschodt's brother.

After graduating from high school and a bachelor's degree in philosophy, he became a journalist for Radio France, then worked in various fields: agricultural machinery salesman, painting representative, art publisher, fish farmer in Camargue. He eventually returned to journalism and worked successively for several publications, including Jours de France, Valeurs actuelles and Le Figaro.

Under the pseudonym Bernard-Paul Lallier, he published Le Saut de l'ange (1968), a detective novel that won that year's Prix du Quai des Orfèvres and was adapted under the eponymous title in cinema by Yves Boisset in 1971. This novel was followed by the sequel L'Ange du paradis, published in 1969. In 1977, Deschodt used the same pseudonym to write the thriller Terreur à Nantes.

Éric Deschodt published essays on French aviation and cigar making under his patronym, 10 or so novels, and biographies of Antoine de Saint-Exupéry, Octave Mirbeau, André Gide, Agrippa d'Aubigné, Gustave Eiffel and Attila. He also wrote translations, including Ceux de Falesa by Robert Louis Stevenson and Mickey Spillane's detective novels.

== Work ==
=== Novels ===
- 1977: Les Demoiselles sauvages, Paris, JC Lattès
- 1979: Le Général des galères, JC Lattès
- 1981: Les Îles captives, JC Lattès
- 1982: La Gloire au Liban, JC Lattès
- 1984: Le Roi a fait battre tambour, JC Lattès
- 1985: Eugénie, les larmes aux yeux, JC Lattès
- 1988: Le Royaume d'Arles, JC Lattès
- 2000: Le Seul Amant, Paris, Éditions du Seuil (in collaboration with Jean-Claude Lattès)
- 2003: Le Scorpion d'or, Paris, La Table Ronde
- 2004: Marguerite et les Enragés: meurtre à Florence, Seuil (in collaboration with Jean-Claude Lattès)
- 2011: Iphigénie Vanderbilt, Paris, Robert Laffont
- 2013: Les Amants du grand monde, Paris, Éditions de Fallois

=== Detective novels signed Bernard-Paul Lallier ===
- 1984: Le Saut de l'ange, Paris, Fayard
- 1969: L'Ange du paradis, Fayard
- 1977: Terreur à Nantes, Paris, Librairie des Champs-Élysées, Le Masque n°1489

=== Essays ===
- 1977: La France envolée: l'aviation et la décadence 1906–1976, Paris, Société de production littéraire
- 1993: Histoire du Mont-de-Piété, Paris, Le Cherche-Midi
- 1996: L'ABCdaire du cigare, Paris, Flammarion, "Art de vivre"
- 1996: Le Cigare, Paris, Éditions du Regard
- 1996: D'un musée l'autre en Picardie, Éditions du Regard
- 2002: So British: Old England, Paris, Éditions du Regard
- 2005: Château Lagrézette, Éditions du Regard, (in collaboration with Alain-Dominique Perrin)
- 2009: Lafite Rothschild, Éditions du Regard

=== Biographies ===
- 1980: Saint-Exupéry, Jean-Claude Lattès
- 1989: Mirbeau, roman d'une terre de France, Jean-Claude Lattès
- 1991: Gide: le « contemporain capital », Paris, Perrin
- 1994: L'Orgueil du guerrier: Claude Barrès, Perrin
- 1995: Agrippa d'Aubigné: le guerrier inspiré, Paris, Robert Laffont
- 2002: Gustave Eiffel: un illustre inconnu, Paris, Pygmalion
- 2006: Attila, Paris, Gallimard, Folio. Biographies n°13
- 2014: Pour Clemenceau, Paris, Éditions de Fallois

== Prizes ==
- 1968: Prix du Quai des Orfèvres for Le Saut de l'ange, novel signed under the pseudonym Bernard-Paul Lallier
- 1981: Prix Roland de Jouvenel for Saint-Exupéry
- 1984: Prix Roland de Jouvenel for Le roi a fait battre tambour
- 1986: Prix des Deux Magots for Eugénie les larmes aux yeux
- 1996: Prix de la biuographie for Agrippa d'Aubigné, le guerrier inspiré

== Cinematographic adaptation ==
- 1971: Le Saut de l'ange, French film by Yves Boisset, with Jean Yanne, Senta Berger and Sterling Hayden

== Sources ==
- Jacques Baudou and Jean-Jacques Schleret, Le Vrai Visage du Masque, Volume 1, Paris, Futuropolis, 1984, p. 273 (Bernard-Paul Lallier).
