= Hideo Noda =

Japanese-American painter

- 野田英夫
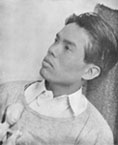
- Born: Noda Hideo (Japanese order); July 15, 1908; Santa Clara, California, United States
- Died: January 12, 1939 (aged 30); Tokyo, Japan
- Education: California School of Fine Arts (San Francisco Art Institute), Art Students League
- Known for: Modernist paintings, modernist murals

Hideo Noda (野田 英夫, Noda Hideo; July 15, 1908 – January 12, 1939), also known as Hideo Benjamin Noda and Benjamin Hideo Noda, was a Japanese-American modernist painter and muralist, member of the Shinseisakuha movement in Japan, student of Arnold Blanch, and uncle of Japanese printmaker Tetsuya Noda, as well as alleged communist spy recruited by Whittaker Chambers.

== Biography ==
=== Background ===
Noda was born on July 15, 1908, in Agnew's Village, as the second son of Eitaro Noda, who had emigrated from a small village in the Kumamoto Prefecture of Japan. He returned for some years to his home prefecture in Kumamoto, where he attended junior high school. Returning to California, he graduated from Piedmont High School in Oakland in 1929.

=== Art ===
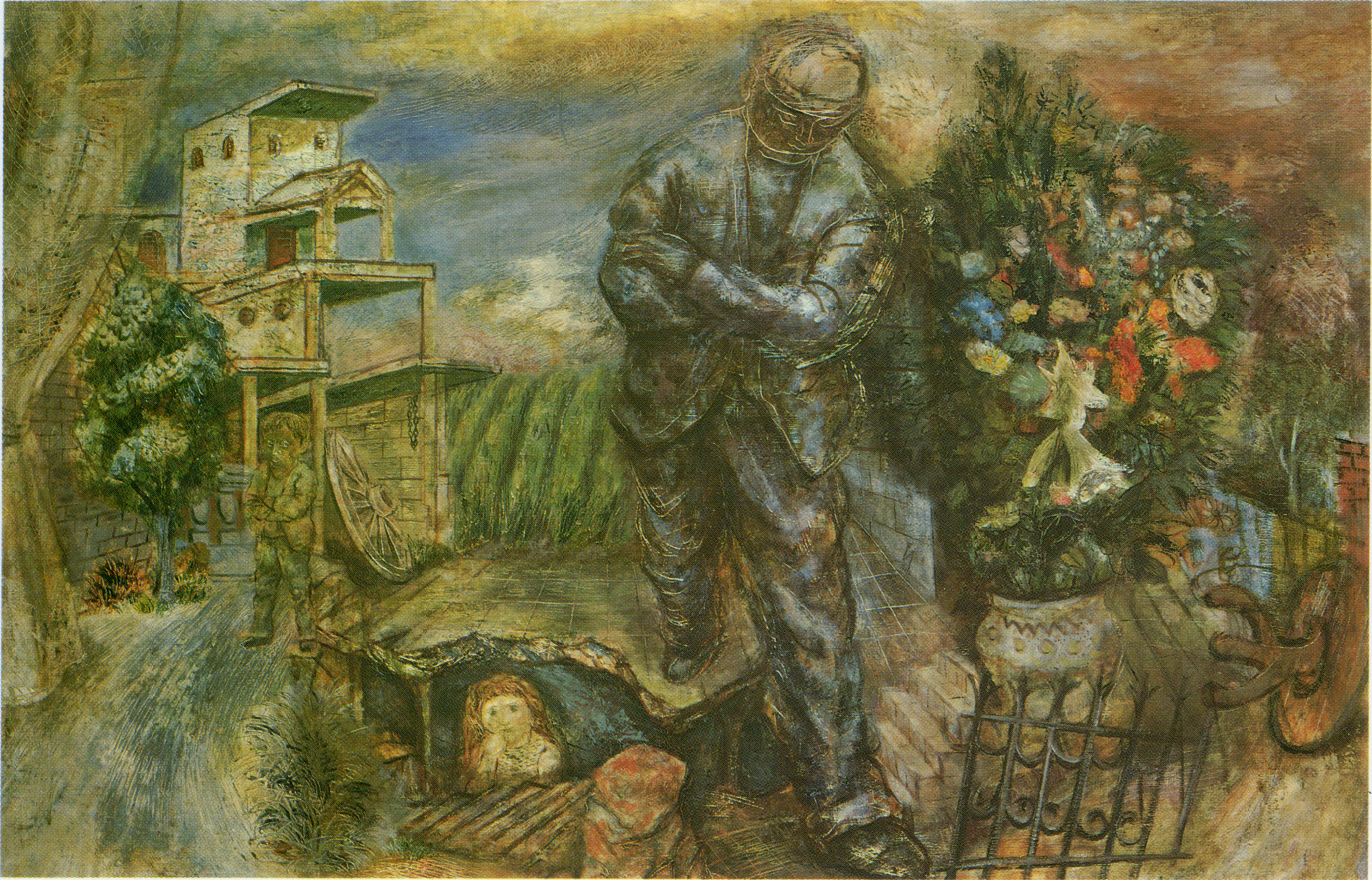
The Way Home (1935)

Noda soon attended the California School of Fine Arts (CSFA—now San Francisco Art Institute. There he met Arnold Blanch, who taught at the Art Students League in New York. Noda saw Diego Rivera paint The Making of a Fresco Showing the Building of a City, April–June 1931, at the school.

Later in 1931, he was studying mural-tempera painting there under Blanch, Yasuo Kuniyoshi, and George Grosz. He lived for a time at the Woodstock Art Village with fellow students Sakari Suzuki and Jack Chikamichi Yamasaki.

In 1932, he won a prize from the Chicago Art Institute and exhibited at the Corcoran Gallery of Washington, DC. He was a member of the Mural Painters Guild and the Woodstock Artists Association

In 1933, Noda became one of several assistants to Rivera on the artist's work for Man at the Crossroads in Rockefeller Center Plaza in New York City. (Other assistants included: Lucienne Bloch, Stephen Pope Dimitroff, Lou Block, Arthur Niendorf, Seymour Fogel, and Antonio Sanchez Flores.)

Photographer Walker Evans knew Noda in New York in 1933. Estelle Hama, wife of painter Art Hama, recalled of 1933-1934 "I met Art in New York at the John Reed Club. They had just formed. He was a protege of the artist Kuniyoshi. I knew Kuniyoshi. Well, everyone knew Yasuo in those days. They were friends Isamu Noguchi, Hideo Noda, and Eitaro Ishigaki."

In 1934–1935, Noda's work appeared in the Whitney Museum's "Second Biennial Exhibition of Contemporary American Painting" along with Kuniyoshi's. According to an entry, "Hideo Noda participates in Whitney Second Biennial; his painting 'Street Scene' is purchased by the museum." The Brooklyn Daily Eagle noted, "Look for Hideo Noda's 'Street Scene.' Noda is a mural painter and a real modern, immensely responsive to the daily sorrows and beauties of people in 1935."

Noda was involved in a conflict over a mural he designed for Ellis Island in 1934–1935. In 1935, Noda's murals lost out to those of Edward Laning for Ellis Island:

It was a great relief to PWA, to the College Art Association, to Architects Harvey Wiley Corbett and Chester Holmes Aldrich and to Edward Laning last week to learn that Commissioner of Immigration & Naturalization Rudolph Reimer at Ellis Island had finally approved Artist Laning's designs for murals for the dining hall at New York's immigrant station. Cheered, Muralist Laning and his two assistants, James Rutledge and Albert Soroka, hustled to get his cartoons on tempera and gesso panels as soon as possible ...
No sooner was Muralist Hideo Noda's cartoon submitted to him than Commissioner Reimer blossomed out as a stickler for artistic detail. The Noda mural was promptly rejected because Negro cotton pickers were shown wearing turtlenecked sweaters and creased trousers, because the creature pulling a poor blackamoor's farm cart seemed to be a full-blooded Percheron stallion. Artist Noda threw up his hands and his job, went back to California.

In 1970, Laning told American Heritage magazine a somewhat different version of events: "Audrey McMahon told me that Hideo Noda, a young Japanese who had been assigned to make sketches for a long wall in the Administration Building at Ellis Island, had disappeared without leaving any word. Hideo, a gentle boy of poetic temperament, had found the resident commissioner of immigration impossible to cope with and in despair had run away. 'The commissioner is difficult,' Mrs. McMahon added, and I thought to myself that if she thought so, he must be a dragon."

Returning to California in 1937, he painted the mural School Life in the Piedmont High School.

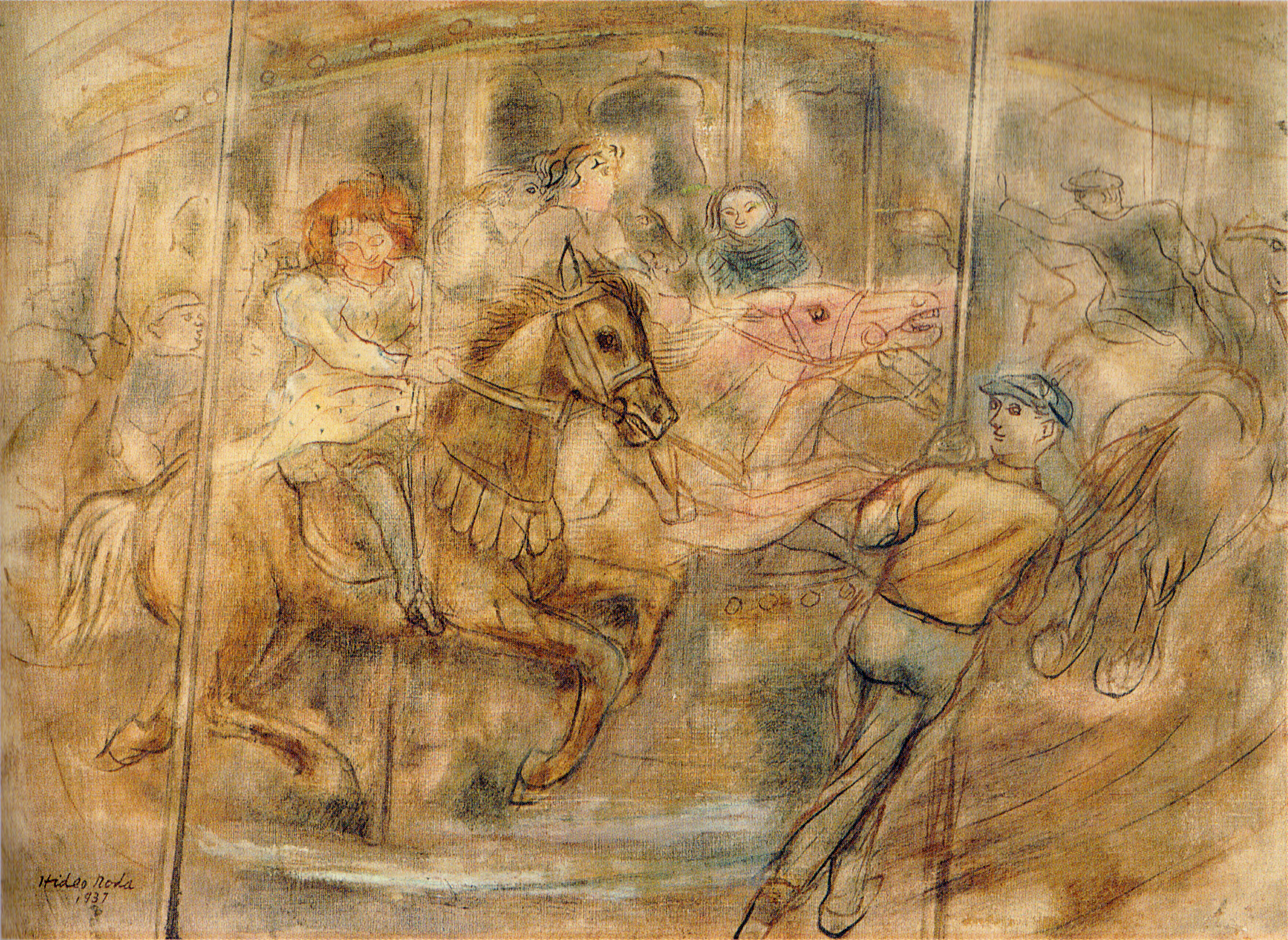
Merry-go-round (1937)

Returning to Japan, he continued his work "in the modern art, art societies, Shinseisakka (ja:新制作協会) and Nikka".

=== Politics and espionage ===
Noda joined the John Reed Club of New York, where Eitaro Ishigaki and "Chuzo Tomatzu" (Chuzo Tamotsu) were founding members. (A fellow student of the Art Students League, member of the John Reed Club, and artist concerned with African-American rights was Esther Shemitz, by 1931 wife of Whittaker Chambers.) In New York, Noda became acquainted with leftist American art historian Meyer Schapiro, a classmate of Chambers at Columbia, and they corresponded between 1934 and 1936.

In his 1952 memoir, Whittaker Chambers claimed to have recruited Noda, who he said was a communist, in late 1934 as translator for the head of a Tokyo spy cell. Helping him were either J. Peters or Meyer Schapiro. Chambers organized the cell from New York City with the help of John Loomis Sherman, who would head the Tokyo cell, and Maxim Lieber, whose literary agency would provide cover for an "American Feature Writers Syndicate". Sherman and Noda spent an unsuccessful year (1935) in Tokyo, at the end of which the cell closed suddenly and both returned to New York.

Chambers provided perhaps the longest description of Noda by a contemporary. He claims he was a member of the American Communist Party. He says he was a relative of one of Japanese premier, Prince Fumimaro Konoe. "He was extremely intelligent, alert, personable and likable." Noda agreed to go to Japan to work for Sherman, who gave him the underground name "Ned". In 1936, upon Noda's return to New York from the failed Tokyo cell, Chambers gave him his next instructions, namely to go to Southern France (Nice or Antibes) and wait until contacted. At that time, Chambers advised him to get out of the underground: Noda reacted by denouncing Chambers as a "Trotskyist wrecker".

Chambers records his last sightings:

Some time in 1937 or 1938, Hideo Noda ... flitted through New York again.
Before Noda had been alert, somewhat as birds are, as if in him mental and physical brightness were one. Now he seemed a little faded and tired.
Our brief meeting was stiff. Perhaps he still considered me a "diversionist mad dog" and was disappointed to find that I had not, after his denunciation of me to the Party, been purged. But I suspect that Noda was so silent because, had he begun to speak, the words that came out would have been: "Oh, horror, horror, horror!" I stood and watched Ned as he walked away, something that I did not often do. I never saw him again.

=== Death ===
Noda died of a brain tumor on January 12, 1939, in Tokyo. According to The New York Times, he had been "visiting Japan for about a year". According to the Brooklyn Daily News, he died on January 11, 1939, at the Imperial University Hospital, Tokyo. Surviving him were his wife, Ruth Noda, in New York, and his parents in Japan. His wife had just returned to New York, and he was to join her shortly. In his 1952 memoir, Chambers "wondered whether, in Ulrich's words, Noda had 'been shot by them or shot by us'".

A 1940 issue of the Bulletin of the New York Public Library notes under "Limited or Other Special Editions" the following entry: "Mrs. Ruth Noda Hulley – No. 120 of a limited edition of 500 copies of Album Hideo Noda, by Shinseisaku-Ha".

== Style ==
In his 1939 obituary, The New York Times declared:

Mr. Noda's art, which was one of the modern school, achieved wide recognition in Japan, where he was considered an important figure in the modern movement known as Shinseisakka. In this country, his work was gaining increasing appreciation as critice noted in it a distinctive "mode," which in his later works approached the surrealism of Paul Klee and Joan Miró.

The Brooklyn Daily Eagle noted, "Noda is a mural painter and a real modern, immensely responsive to the daily sorrows and beauties of people in 1935."

== Japanese-American artists ==
A number of Japanese-American artists involved themselves in Communism during the 1930s:

Both Ishigaki and Noda were members of the communist John Reed Club ... However, as Japan's militarism became threatening to the U.S., Noda was actually "censured" because he was a second-generation Japanese American who had been educated in Japan in his youth

(The "censure" above may include reference to Noda's loss of the Ellis Island mural competition.) Attracting these artists were the plight of African-Americans:

Liberal American artists responded with protest images, again encouraged by the ACA Galleries. Japanese American artists could easily empathize with their black contemporaries, another minority facing discrimination, and they made work that joined them in protest. Among them were Ishigaki, painter Hideo Noda, the young sculptor Leo Amino ... The young Noguchi dramatically suspended a contorted, life-sized figure from a rope in his 'Death (Lynched Figure)' (1934). Outside the West Coast, Japanese expatriate intellectuals formed bonds with African Americans. In New York, Eitaro Ishigaki painted a black history mural for a Harlem courthouse, while he, Isamu Noguchi, and Hideo Noda each produced artworks of lynchings.

== Works ==
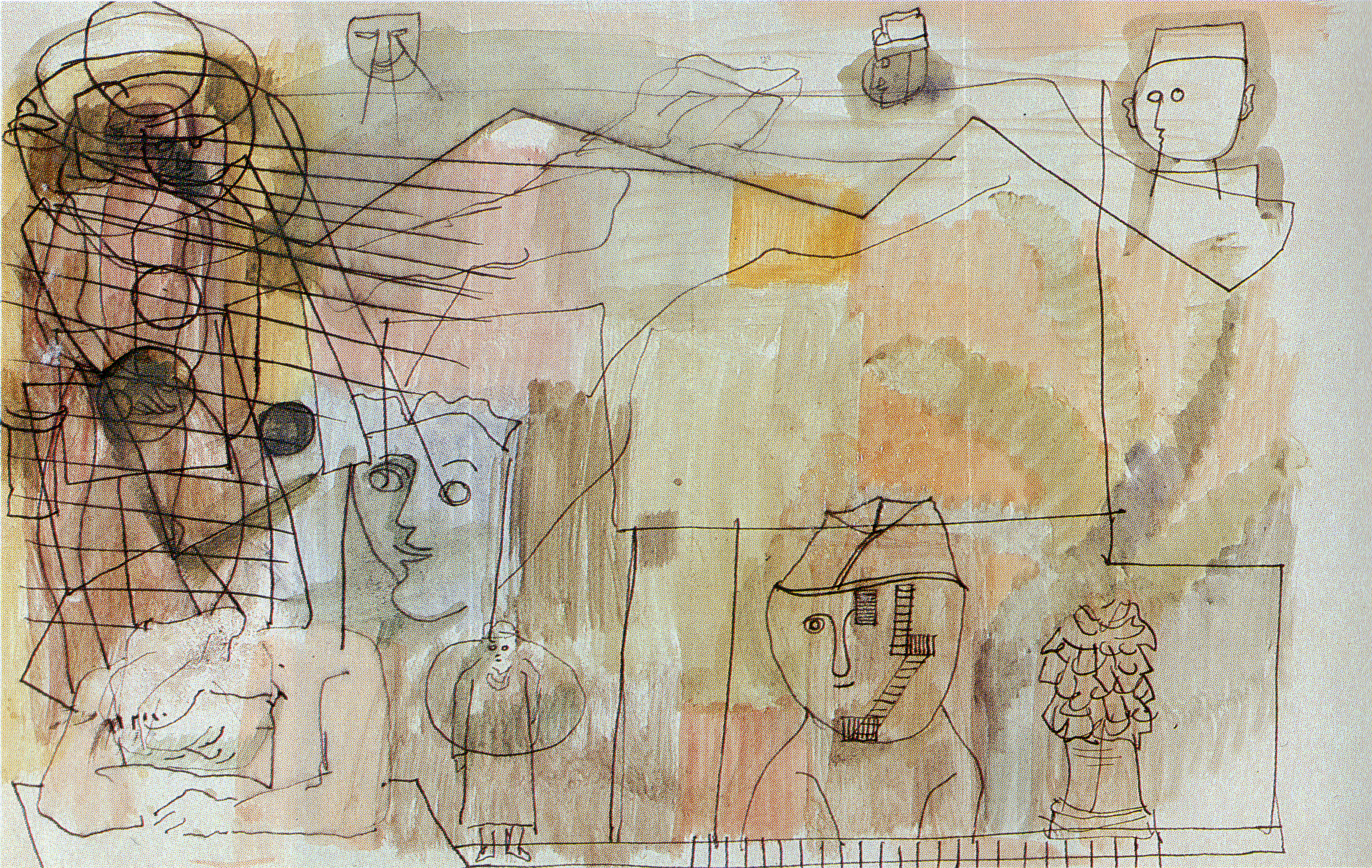
Landscape (1933)

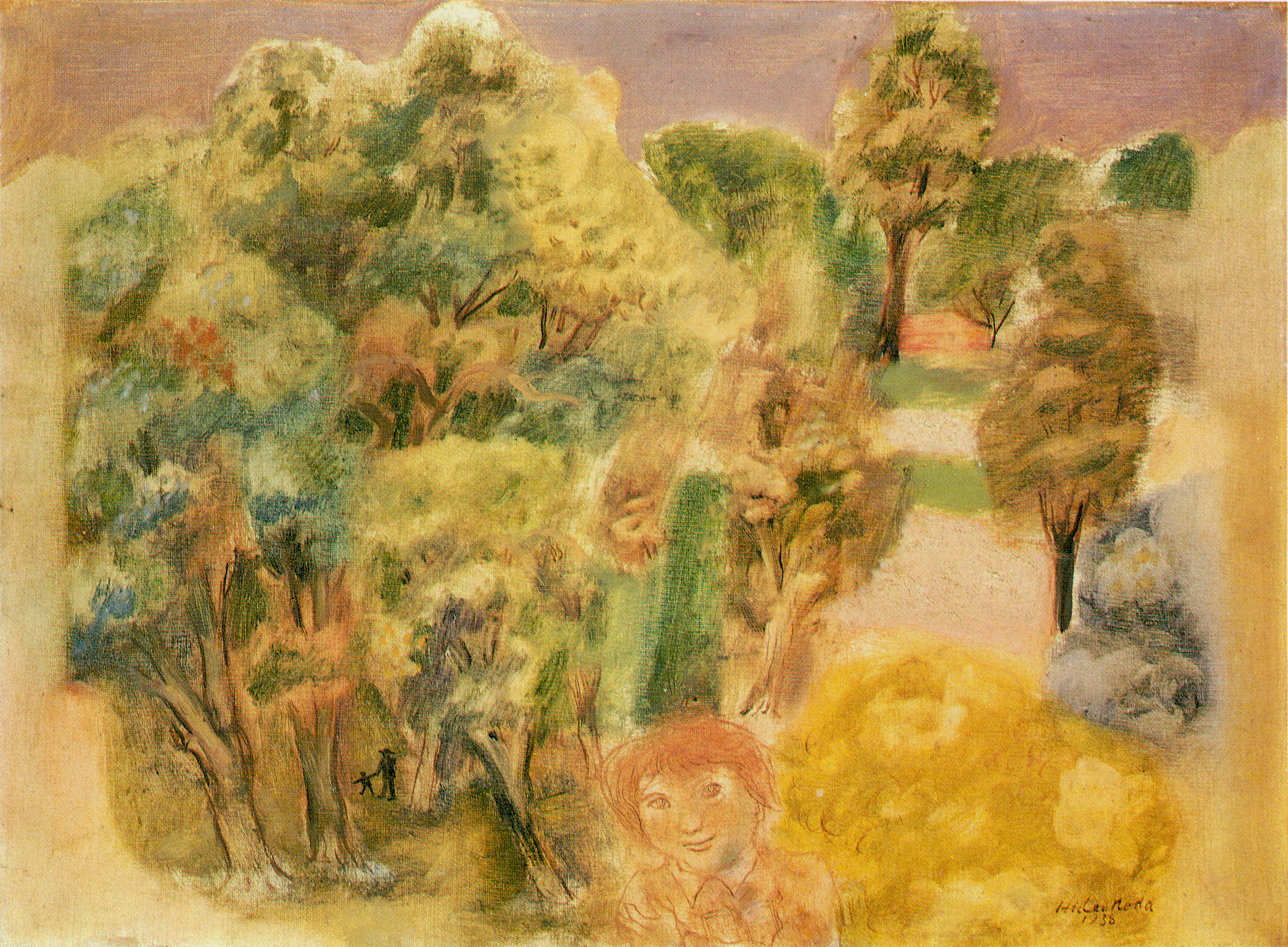
Landscape (1938)

=== Paintings ===
==== Major works ====
According to the Japanese entry of Wikipedia (as of November 28, 2014), the following represent Noda's major works:

- Landscape 1932 (1932) watercolor and paper
- Landscape 1936 (1936) oil on board
- Person, ink
- Person (people of the market), watercolor

==== Murals ====
- Man at the Crossroads (1933), assisted Diego Rivera, Rockefeller Center Plaza
- School Life (Piedmont High School) (1937) fresco (Kumamoto Prefectural Museum of Art, Kumamoto, Japan

Other major works include his 1933 Scottsboro Boys (now in the Shinano Design Museum) and Street Scene (which appeared in the 1934–1935 exhibit at the Whitney).

==== Undated ====
Other works appeared in a 2013 exhibition in Japan, including the 1936 Tokyo Botanical Garden sketch.

=== Collections ===
- Kumamoto Prefectural Museum of Art: Hideo Noda (numerous URLS)
- Okawa Museum of Art

=== Exhibitions ===
- 1931: California School of Fine Arts (now San Francisco Art Institute)
- 1932: Woodstock Art Show: Danger, Keep to the Right and The Agitators
- 1933: Eighth Street Gallery (with Samuel Shane)
- 1933: Art Institute of Chicago
- 1934: American Contemporary Art Gallery (ACA Gallery)
- 1934–1935: Whitney Museum: Second Biennial Exhibition of Contemporary American Painting (November 27, 1934 – January 10, 1935): Street Scene
- 1935: Nika Art Exhibition (Japan)
- 1995: Nerima Kuritsu Bijutsukan: Amerikan shīn no Nihonjin gatatachi ten: Shimizu Toshi, Kuniyoshi Yasuo, Ishigaki Eitarō, Kitagawa Tamiji, Noda Hideo (April 29 – June 4, 1995)
- 2013: Gallery Toki No Wasuemono/Watanuki Inc.: Hideo Noda, Tamiji Kitagawa, Yasuo Kuniyoshi (April 19–27, 2013)

== Legacy ==
Noda receives mention in many books about Rivera that detail the New York mural. This includes The Fabulous Life of Diego Rivera by Bertram Wolfe and Rivera's own Portrait of America with photographs by Walker Evans.

=== Noda Fund ===
The Piedmont High School sold its mural to the Kumamoto Prefectural Museum of Art:

The Noda Fund was established by the Board of Education to use proceeds from the sale of a mural by artist (and former PHS student) Benjamin Hideo Noda to establish a fund from which the interest earned is used for grants to support visual arts at the secondary level. The Noda account is fully funded, and there are no changes to report at the second interim and there are no significant changes in the multi-year projects.

== See also ==
- Relatives: Tetsuya Noda (nephew)
- Mentors: Diego Rivera, Arnold Blanch, Yasuo Kuniyoshi, George Grosz
- Japanese-American Artists: Yasuo Kuniyoshi, Eitaro Ishigaki
- Communist Network: Whittaker Chambers, Meyer Schapiro, John Loomis Sherman, Maxim Lieber, J. Peters
- Sanzō Nosaka
- Hotsumi Ozaki

== External sources ==
- KotoBank: Noda Hideo
- Uki City: Noda Hideo
- Art of Kumamoto Prefecture. Kumamoto Prefectural Museum of Art. 1995.
- Kuboshima (1992). My Love Died Young Painters. Kodansha Gendaishinsho. pp. 171–202.
- Kumamoto Prefecture Encyclopedia. Kumamotonichinichishinbunsha. 1982. p. 647.
- Asano, Toru (1982). Amerika ni Mananda Nihon no Gakatachi: Kuniyoshi, Shimizu, Ishigaki, Noda to Amerikan Shiin kaiga (Japanese Painters Who Studied in America and the American Scene). Tokyo & Kyoto.
- "Guide to the California Asian American Artists Biographical Survey Records". Online Archive of California.
- "Asians in America".
- ShiPu Wang (2017). "We Are Scottsboro Boys: Hideo Noda's Visual Rhetoric of Transracial Solidarity". The Other American Moderns. Matsura, Ishigaki, Noda, Hayakawa. Penn State University Press. ISBN 978-0-271-07773-4.
