= Louis Cane =

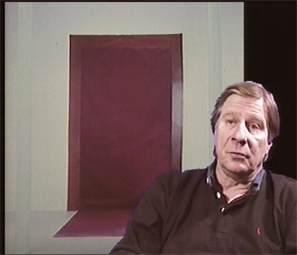
- Cane in 1995
- Born: 13 December 1943; Beaulieu-sur-Mer, Italian-occupied France
- Died: 3 November 2024 (aged 80); Paris, France
- Occupations: Painter; sculptor; furniture designer

Louis Cane (13 December 1943 – 3 November 2024) was a French painter, sculptor, and furniture designer. He was a member of the Supports/Surfaces movement in France, which lasted from 1969 to 1972. Much of his work focused on the concept of deconstruction of the canvas.

== Biography ==
Cane was born on 13 December 1943 in Beaulieu sur Mer, France. He attended the National School of Decorative Arts in Nice then the Superior School of Decorative Arts in Paris in 1961, obtaining a diploma in Interior Architecture.

Cane was a part of the Supports/Surfaces movement in France, which lasted from 1969 to 1972, and co-founded and edited the Peinture, Cahiers Theoriques.

Cane died in Paris on 3 November 2024, aged 80.

== Work ==
Cane focused on the concept of deconstruction of the canvas. For his series, Louis Cane artiste peintre français, he continuously stamped his name on a sheet, exploring the idea of personal branding.

By 1970, Cane transitioned into a series of cut-out paintings, the toiles découpées, which he worked with for several years. His process for paintings was much like Jackson Pollock or Helen Frankenthaler, by painting the unstretched canvas on the ground.

He participated in the second and third exhibition of the Supports/Surfaces group at the Théâtre de la Cité Internationale in Paris.

In 1971, Cane had his first solo exhibition in Paris at the Daniel Templon Gallery, followed by the Yvon Lambert Gallery in 1972. From 1972 to 1972, he produced a series called Sol/Mur as part of the Supports/Surfaces movement.

Cane continued his abstract series until 1975. These canvases were unstretched, spread on the floor, spray painted and folded in half, then cut and staples directly on the wall.

In 1978, Cane returned from abstract painting to figuration. He reflected on the history of pictorial forms. He also started integrating sculpture into his practice. The statues were almost exclusively female occasionally appearing in form of burlesque or baroque expressionism.

Cane was also a furniture designer, which is an important part of his artistic creation.

== Selected exhibitions ==
=== Solo exhibitions ===
- 1971 - Galerie Templon, Paris, France
- 1991 - Musée Municipal de Bellas Artes, Santander, Spain
- 1995 - Museum of contemporary Art, Cambrai, France

=== Group exhibitions ===
- 1979 - Museum of modern Art - A.R.C., Paris, France
- 1991 - Supports/Surfaces, Museum of modern Art, Saint-Etienne, France
- 2002 - Supports/Surfaces, Galerie Dorsky, New York, USA
- 2019 - Unfurled: Supports/ Surfaces 1966-1976, curated by Wallace Whitney, MOCAD, Detroit, USA

== Public Collections ==
- Centre national des arts plastiques, Paris, France
- Musée national d’art moderne - centre Pompidou, Paris, France
- Musée d’Art moderne et d’Art contemporain de Nice, France
- Carré d’Art, Nîmes, France
- Musée d’art moderne de la ville de Paris, France
- Les Abattoirs, Toulouse, France
- Frac Picardie, Amiens, France
- Musée d’art moderne et contemporain, Saint-Etienne, France
- Frac Alsace, Sélestat, France
- Frac Normandie, Caen, France
- Musée de Grenoble, France
- Collection Institut d’art contemporain, Rhône-Alpes, Villeurbanne, France
- Musée d’art de Nantes, France
- Musée d’art contemporain du Val-de-Marne, Vitry-sur-Seine, France
