= Anne-Marie Cazalis =

French actor and writer

- Born: c.1920 Boufarik, Algeria
- Died: 30 July 1988 (aged 67–68); Paris, France
- Occupations: Writer, journalist, actress

Anne-Marie Cazalis (c. 1920 – 30 July 1988) was a French writer, journalist and briefly an actress.

== Biography ==
She was a friend of Juliette Gréco. Briefly, she had an affair with a little-known cellist, Paul Taylor, and both became emblematic personalities of the Parisian nights of Saint-Germain-des-Prés, where she frequented other writers such as Boris Vian and Jean-Paul Sartre. She later became a journalist and, a correspondent for Elle magazine. She travelled all around the world. She also participated in a few films and published several essays and novels. In 1948, she worked with Jean Cau on the screenplay for Ulysse ou les Mauvaises Rencontres, a pochade filmed by Alexandre Astruc.

== Works ==
=== Cinema ===
- 1949: Désordre by Jacques Baratier (short film)
- 1950: Le Château de verre by René Clément : the standardiste
- 1950: Le Quadrille by Jacques Rivette, with Jean-Luc Godard (short film)
- 1966: Le Désordre à vingt ans by Jacques Baratier (documentary)

=== Theatre ===
- 1951: Le Diable et le Bon Dieu, script by Jean-Paul Sartre, directed by Louis Jouvet, Théâtre Antoine

=== Books ===
- Planh, 10 poèmes de Anne-Marie Cazalis, avec un portrait de l'auteur par Valentine Hugo, Paris, Odette Lieutier, February 1944. Written in French, the work was published in Paris in February 1944 by Odette Lieutier. Still under German occupation, the editor issued only 250 hand-made books. A quadrilingual new edition in French, English, Portuguese and Spanish was published in 2012.
- La Décennie, Fayard, 1972 (novel)
- La Tunisie par-ci par-là, Promotion africaine, Tunisia, 1972
- Kadhafi, le Templier d'Allah, Gallimard, 1974
- Le Cœur au poing, La Table ronde, 1976 (novel)
- Mémoires d'une Anne, Stock, 1976
- 1358, La Jacquerie de Paris, le destin tragique du maire Étienne Marcel, Société de production littéraire, 1977
- Les Belles Années, co-written with Anne-Marie Deschodt, Mercure de France, 1978 (novel)

== Awards ==
- 1943, Paul-Valéry award for poetry laureate
