= Gallery Itsutsuji =

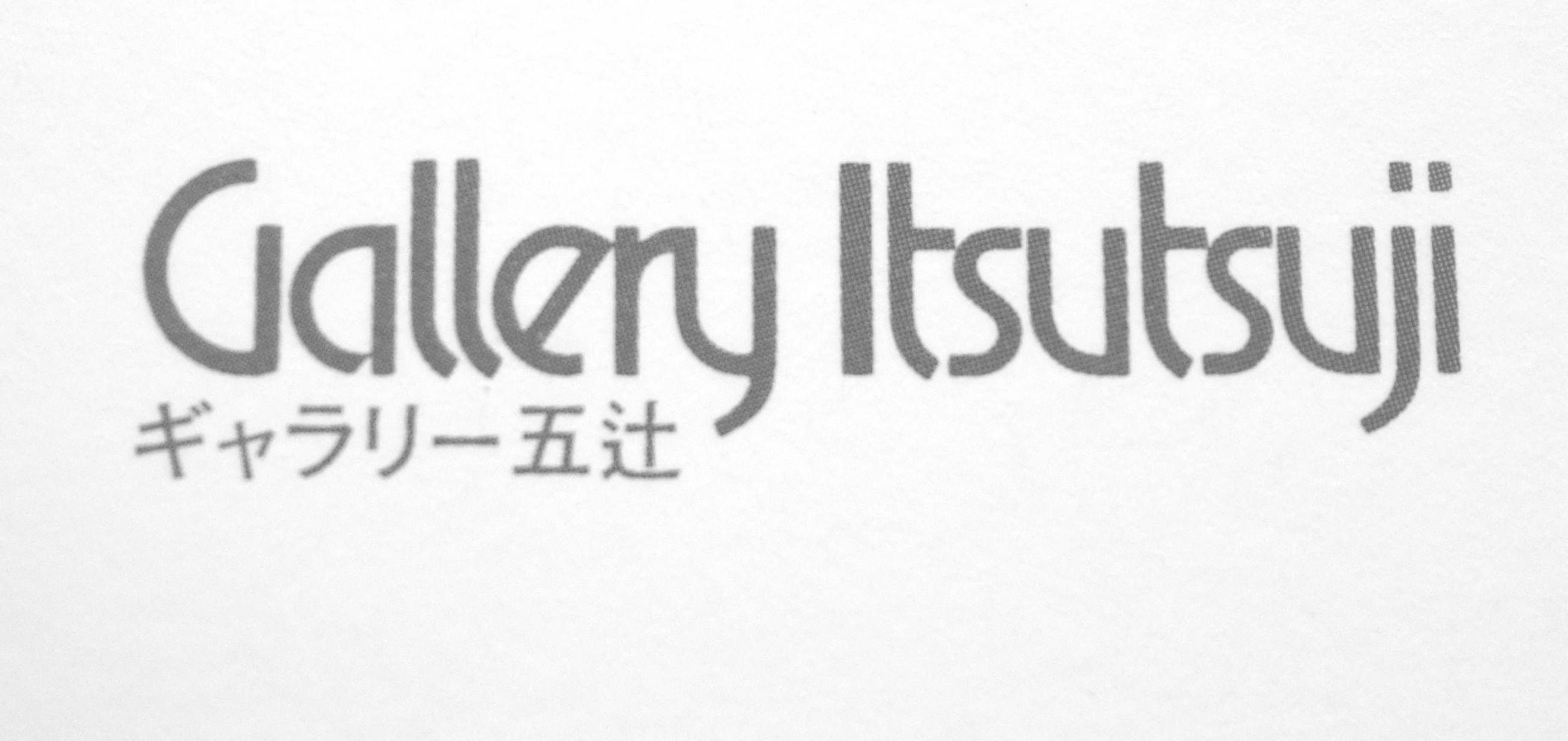
- Company type: Contemporary Art Gallery
- Industry: Art Gallery
- Founded: 1990
- Headquarters: Tokyo, Japan

Gallery Itsutsuji (ギャラリー 五辻, Gyararī Itsutsuji) is a contemporary art gallery founded in 1990 by Michiyasu Itsutsuji.

== History ==
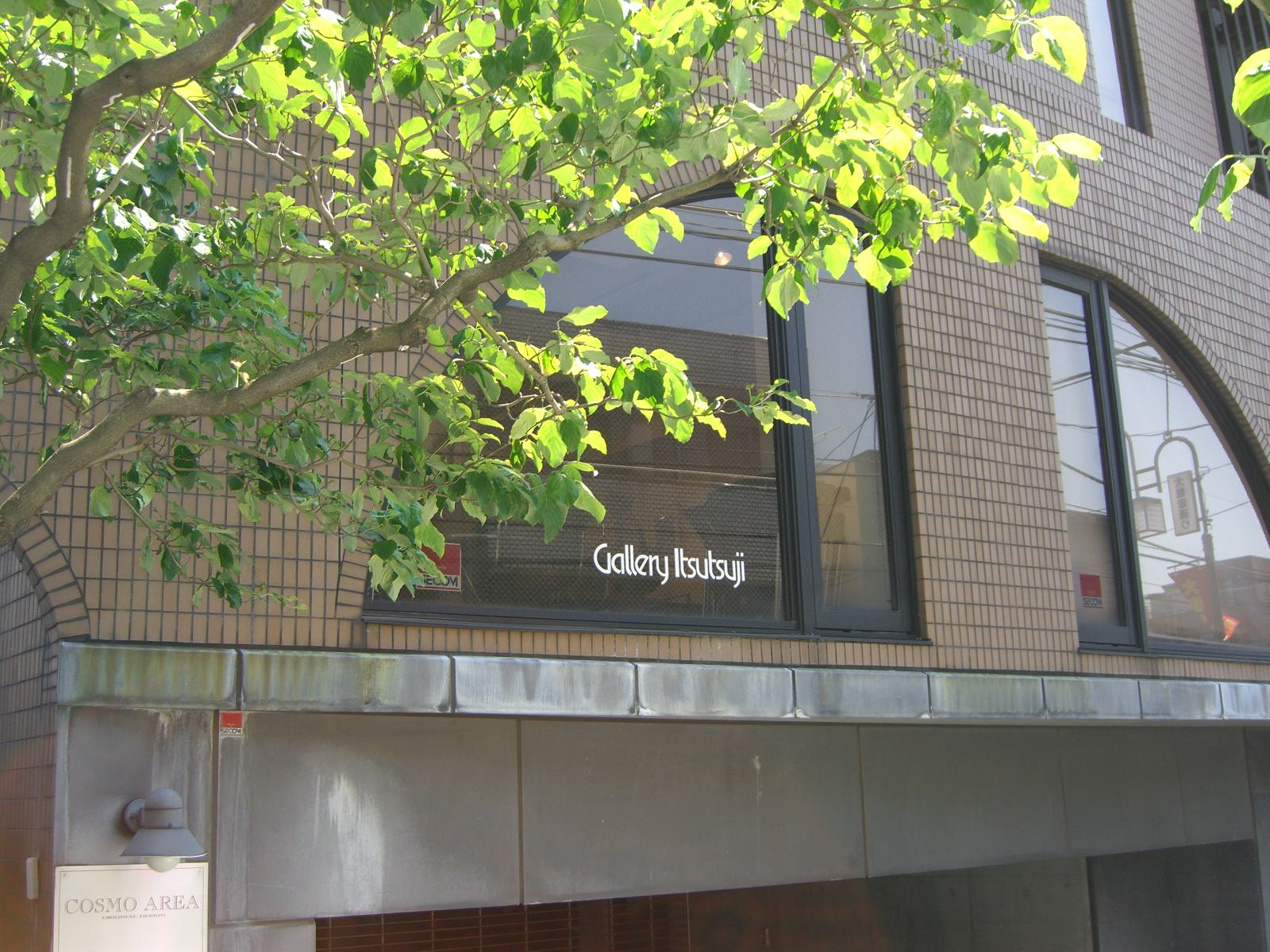

Expanding a tradition built over 20 years from around 1970 to 1990 by Fuji Television Gallery, Michiyasu Itsutsuji founded in the traditional cultural heart of Tokyo (Bunkyo-ku) this contemporary art gallery in 1990 (see Art Museum, notable galleries list). Michiyasu Itsutsuji was made by French Culture Ministry a Knight (chevalier) of Ordre des Arts et Lettres (reputed sponsor Musee du Jeu de Paume's D. Abadie.

When in the mid 60s to 70s the support-surface movement appeared in France, Gallery Itsutsuji was the point of introduction of the movement into Japan, exposing it to museums and private and corporate collections.

For example, Claude Viallat, Louis Cane, Jean-Pierre Pincemin, Daniel Dezeuze, and Jean-Michel Meurice, Gérard Titus-Carmel, Pierre Buraglio.

Currently, while still representing the artist the gallery helped introducing to Japan, the gallery promotes the following younger artists: Guillaume Bottazzi from France, Katsue Sukenari from Japan and others. It also promotes Japanese contemporary artists, Ay-O being one of them.

== Biography ==
Before founding his own gallery, Michiyasu Itsutsuji worked at the Fuji TV gallery. He recently played advisory roles in some exhibits at Fukui City Museum, Miyazaki prefectural art museum.
