= Davida Hesse-Lilienberg =

Swedish operatic soprano

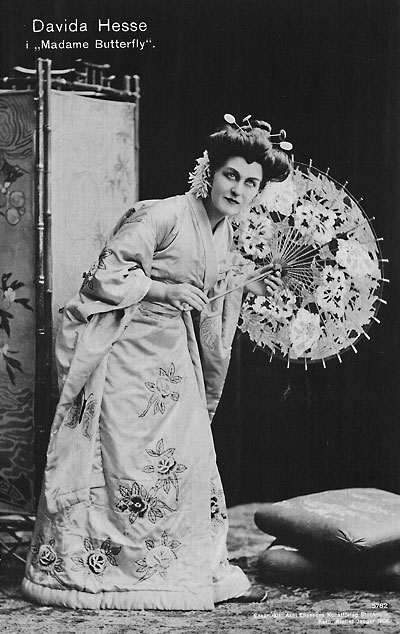
Davida Hesse as Madame Butterfly (1908)

Signe Davida Augusta Hesse-Lilienberg (1877–1964) was a Swedish operatic soprano. She made her debut at the Royal Swedish Opera in 1904 as Zerlina in Mozart's Don Giovanni. Until 1909, she performed leading soprano roles for the company, gaining popularity thanks to her strong, wide-ranging voice and her effective stagecraft. She is remembered in particular for the title role in Puccini's Madame Butterfly which she first performed at the Swedish premiere in August 1908. After her marriage in 1910, she continued to appear occasionally as a guest performer at the opera as well as in recitals. In 1921, she was elected a member of the Royal Swedish Academy of Music.

== Early life, education and family ==
Born in Gävle on 29 January 1877, Signe Davida Augusta Hesse was the daughter of the photographer Johan Oscar Hjalme Hesse and his wife Caroline née Dybeck. After matriculating from the French School in Gävle, Hesse attended the Stockholm Conservatory from 1895 to 1901 studying under Julius Günther. She then studied drama and stagecraft under Signe Hebbe (1902–04). In 1910, she married the high-ranking jurist Bernt Erik Viktor Lilienberg with who she had two daughters: Märta (1911) and Eva (1913). Bernt Lilienberg was deeply involved in local politics and was also active in supporting music.

== Career ==
In accordance with the rules of the times, for her debut at the Royal Swedish Opera in 1904, Hesse appeared in three performances. These were as Zerlina in Don Giovanni, the Princess in Peter Lange-Müller's Vikingeblod, and Susanna in Mozart's The Marriage of Figaro. As a result, she was engaged by the company where she appeared in some 20 leading soprano roles over the next five years. These included Marzelline in Beethoven's Fidelio, Mimi in Puccini's La bohème, Gilda in Verdi's Rigoletto, Zélide in Adolphe Adam's Si j'étais roi, and above all the title role in Madame Butterfly. She first performed this role at the Swedish premiere in August 1908 but soon became closely identified with it.

After retiring from the Royal Opera in 1910, she spent a year in Berlin, studying under the American baritone Arthur Foxton Ferguson. On returning to Sweden in 1912, she gave concerts in Stockholm and Gothenburg, occasionally appearing as a guest at the Royal Opera. Her last public appearance was on 3 January 1928 in connection with the 300th anniversary of Gävle's Trinity Church (Heliga Trefaldighets kyrka). She was a soloist in a cantata by Matheus Lundberg (text) and Olof Wadborg (music).

Davida Hesse-Lilienberg died in Stockholm on 23 June 1964.

== Awards ==
In 1921, Hesse-Lilienberg was elected a member of the Royal Swedish Academy of Music. In 1923, for the contributions to Swedish culture, Hesse-Lilienberg was awarded the Litteris et Artibus in 1923.
