= Daniel Dezeuze =

French painter

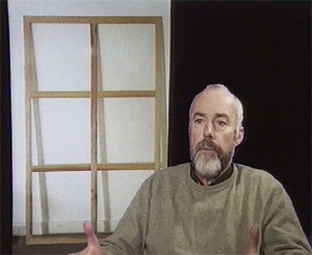
Daniel Dezeuze. 1995

Daniel Dezeuze (born 1942) is a French artist and a founding member of the French group of artists called Supports/Surfaces. This group (made up of Dezeuze, Claude Viallat, Patrick Saytour, Louis Cane, André-Pierre Arnal, Vincent Bioulès, Noêl Dolla, Jean-Pierre Pincemin, André Valensi, Marc Devade, Toni Grand, and Bernard Pagès) started to form in 1966. Their common concern was a desire to deconstruct painting in order to re-examine its history and question its nature. Colour is a fundamental question in many of their works. They frequently used non-traditional materials and referred to other non-western cultures.

== Exhibitions ==
- 1998 Carré d'Art -musée d'Art contemporain, Nîmes
- 2001 La Chaufferie et Musée d'Art moderne et Contemporain, Strasbourg
- 2003 Galerie Fernand Léger (Credac), Ivry-sur-Seine
- FRAC Bourgogne, Dijon
- Espace d'art contemporain du domaine départemental du Château d'O, Montpellier
- 2005 Espace d'art contemporain Gustave Fayet, Sérignan
- 2006 Armes et Scènes de guerre Château de Salses (66) dépôt permanent
- 2008 Galerie Daniel Templon. Kringst-Ernst Gallery, Cologne. Musée Paul Valéry, Sète
- 2017 Daniel Dezeuze - a retrospective, Musée de Grenoble, France
