= George Davida =

American computer scientist (1944–2025)

George I. Davida (August 2, 1944 – August 20, 2025) was an American computer scientist and cryptographer. He was an outspoken proponent of public access to cryptography and an opponent of various National Security Agency (NSA) and US federal government policies and initiatives like the Clipper chip, a stance dating back to his 1977 reception of a gag order from the NSA under the Invention Secrecy Act relating to a patent application for a stream cipher device, using research funded by a National Science Foundation grant.

Davida received his B.S. and Ph.D. degrees in Electrical Engineering and then worked as a faculty at the Department of Electrical Engineering and Computer Science at the University of Iowa. He was director of the University of Wisconsin–Milwaukee's Center for Cryptography, Computer and Network Security, until retiring in 2010. He was a co-founder of the IEEE Symposium on Security and Privacy, a leading conference in this field of research, and in 2010 he got a special recognition at the conference. His publications are listed in the DBLP, and his basic attack on the multiplicative nature of the textbook version of the RSA cryptosystem's signing was reported in the Communications of the ACM in 1984.
