= Davina =

Davina may refer to:

== Given name ==
- Davina (R&B singer) (born 1965), American R&B vocalist and musician
- Davina Ingrams, 18th Baroness Darcy de Knayth (1938–2008), member of the House of Lords
- Davina Kotulski (born 1970), American civil rights activist
- Davina Kumari-Baker, 16-year-old English murder victim
- Lady Davina Windsor (born 1977), British aristocrat
- Davina Duerr (born 1971), American politician
- Davina Oriakhi (born 1994), Nigerian-born singer based in London
- Davina Whitehouse (1912–2002), English-born actress
- Davina Delor (born 1952), French dancer and writer
- Davina Geiss (born 2003), German influencer
- Davina McCall (born 1967), British television presenter, known for hosting Big Brother UK and The Million Pound Drop
- Davina Semo (born 1981), American sculptor
- Davina Hill, alias used by the various guitarists of the band Slady

== Other uses ==
- Davina (talk show), a British talk show hosted by Davina McCall
- Davina the Dolphin (formerly Dave the Dolphin), a dolphin who resided off the coast in the Folkestone and Hythe area of England
