= Marc Devade =

French painter

Marc Devade

Marc Devade (1943–1983) was a French painter. He is well known for his ink paintings and involvement with the Supports/Surfaces movement.

== Biography ==
Marc Devade was a painter and writer.

In 1962 Devade began studying philosophy. He was a member of the editorial board of the journal Tel Quel, co-founder and editor of Painting, Theoretical Notebooks, and was one of the main leaders of the debates on the relationships between practice and theory in the field of visual arts. He initially started out as a poet, with an admiration of philosophy.

The involvement of ink in his work correlate to his interest in China and Maoism.

In 1970, he joined the Supports/Surfaces group in exhibitions and discussions.

The painter's first exhibition opened at the Le Haut Pavé gallery in Paris in 1970. The artist dedicated his practice in the Supports/Surfaces movement to integrating aesthetic, philosophy, and political ideology. The ideas lived in the Peinture, Cahiers Théoriques.

The artist live on dialysis treatments and died at the age of forty.

== Work ==
From 1972 to 1974, were very important years of this artists life.

In 1972, Devade started using Indian ink instead of acrylic paint in his works. He overlapped layers and experimented with the transparency of the ink.

During his brief career, he never gave up his stretched canvas, like many other members of the Supports/Surfaces group. Instead his intention was for the ink and colors to make the canvas forgotten, to put full focus on the dispersion of light and layering.

== Selected exhibitions ==
=== Solo exhibitions ===
1998

Exposition dédiée à l'activité, l'oeuvre et la mémoire de Marc Devade, Galerie Gérald Piltzer, Paris, France

Marc Devade, dessins, Galerie Bernard Jordan, Paris, France

1989

Galerie Jacques Girard, Toulouse, France

=== Group exhibitions ===
2019

Unfurled, Supports/Surfaces 1966-1976, MOCAD

2018

Supports/Surfaces, Galeria Mascota

The Surface of the East Coast: Supports/Surfaces from Nice to New York, Bienvenu Steinberg & Partner

2007

Musée des Beaux-Arts, Le Havre, France

1971

Peinture, cahiers théoriques, n°1, Galerie Yvon Lambert, Paris, France

1970

Supports/Surfaces, Musée d'Art Moderne de la Ville de Paris, A.R.C., Paris, France
