= Vincent Bioulès =

French painter

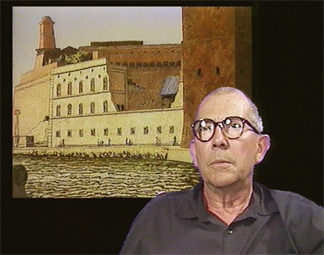
Vincent Bioulès

Vincent Bioulès is a French painter, born on March 5, 1938 in Montpellier, where he lives and works.

== Biography ==
Bioulès was born and continues to live and work in Montpellier.

He has taught at several Fine Art schools including École nationale supérieure des Beaux-Arts in Paris.

== Work ==
In 1966 Vincent Bioulès participated in the “Impact” exhibition in Céret ( Pyrénées-Orientales ).

Vincent Bioulès was one of the founders of the Supports/Surfaces movement in 1968. Unlike many of the other artists of the group, Bioulès never renounced the stretched canvas. His focus in the group was to work the surfaces and accentuate the notion of its extent rather than its materiality.

In 1969, he founded the ABC Productions group with Tjeerd Alkema, Jean Azemard, Alain Clément and Patrice Vermeille.

He left the Supports/Surfaces group in 1972

In the mid-70s, he transitioned from abstraction to figurative painting, through portraiture and landscape. His panoramas come from mnemonic images.

== Selected exhibitions ==
=== Solo exhibitions ===
2006

- Espace et Paysage, 1966-2006, Musée d’Art Moderne de Céret, Céret, France

1992

- Nues, Musée d'Art Moderne, Saint-Etienne, France

=== Group exhibitions ===
2019

- Unfurled: Supports/ Surfaces 1966-1976, curated by Wallace Whitney, MOCAD, Detroit, USA

2018

- ART PARIS ART FAIR, Grand Palais, Paris, France

1998

- Les Années Supports / Surfaces dans les collections du centre Georges Pompidou, Musée du -2000, Jeu de Paume, Paris, France

1970

- Support(s)-Surface(s), ARC, musée d’Art moderne de la Ville de Paris, France

1966

- Jeunes peintres de l’école de Montpellier, musée Fabre, Montpellier, France.

=== Public collection ===
- Centre national des arts plastiques, Paris, France
- Musée d’art moderne de Céret, France
- Frac Occitanie, Montpellier, France
- Musée national d’art moderne - centre Pompidou, Paris, France
- Centre communal d’art contemporain, Marseille, France
- Musée d’Art moderne et d’Art contemporain de Nice, France
- Les Abattoirs, Toulouse, France
- Musée d’art moderne et contemporain, Saint-Etienne, France
- Frac Île-de-France, Paris, France
- CAPC Musée d’art contemporain de Bordeaux, France
- Frac Franche-Comté, Besançon, France
- Frac Provence-Alpes- Côtes d’Azur : Collection, Marseille
- Collection Institut d’Art contemporain, Rhône-Alpes, Villeurbanne, France
- Musée d’art Moderne et contemporain, Strasbourg, France
