= Davida Kidd =

Canadian artist

Davida Kidd (born 1956) is a contemporary Canadian artist who specializes in print media and manipulated photography.

== Life ==
Kidd was born in Edmonton, Alberta. She graduated with a Bachelor of Arts in Visual Communication Design from the University of Alberta in 1984, and a Master of Visual Arts from the University of Alberta in 1988 with a focus on print media. She has been teaching print media at the University College of the Fraser Valley's Visual Arts Department in Abbotsford, British Columbia, Canada, since 1996. Kidd is currently an Associate Professor of Print Media at the University of the Fraser Valley in Abbotsford, British Columbia.

== Career ==
Kidd's professional life is marked by a bold interrogation of the "truthfulness" of the photographic image. Her artistic philosophy challenges the perception that photographs are a direct representation of reality. Instead, she suggests they are constructions of truth and identity, proposing that reality is subject to interpretation and manipulation.

In her practice, Kidd has consistently explored the interplay between text and image. This is evidenced by her portfolio, which includes not only prints but also artist's books and large-scale installations. Her approach often involves the juxtaposition of image and narrative, which invites viewers to engage in a dialogue with the artwork, encouraging a deeper exploration of its meaning.

Throughout her career, Kidd has exhibited both nationally and internationally, with her works being included in numerous public and private collections.

Source: “Between the Sublime and the Subliminial”, ISBN 83-88890-32-8

== Artistic style and influence ==
Kidd's unique style, which incorporates a variety of media and processes, sets her work apart. The results of this multimodal process are frequently works that are both visually arresting and thought-provoking. The text makes references to an intricate layering of visual components that enhance her artwork' narrative richness.

The breadth and intricacy of her work imply that she has had a substantial impact on modern printmaking and digital art; her influence on colleagues and the larger art community, as well as her involvement in collaborative projects, are alluded to but not fully explored in the text that is currently available. She has added to a conversation on the nature of reality in art by challenging the accuracy of photographic representation, which is probably of interest to both the general audience and critics.

== Work ==
Kidd typically combines photography, printmaking, collage, and digital manipulation to create surreal images that blur the line between illusion and, reality. In 2006, a catalogue was published by the International Print Triennial Society, Krakow Poland entitled “Davida Kidd” She uses constructed sets and staged subjects to create large-scale photographic images that include multiple images and views.

The subject matter of her art deals with art history and advertising both contemporary, and historical. Resulting in a satirical commentary on current social issues.

== Awards ==
Kidd was the winner of the Grand Prix at the 2003 International Print Triennial in Krakow, Poland.

== Collections ==
Kidd's work is in the collections of the Alberta Foundation for the Arts, the University of Alberta Permanent Art Collection, the Canada Council Art Bank, and the Surrey Art Gallery, amongst others.

== Select exhibitions ==
- Davida Kidd: Between the Subliminal and the Sublime (solo), International Cultural Centre, Krakow, Poland (2006)
- Debutante: Davida Kidd, Paula Scott, Lisa Hebden, Liz Carter, Two Rivers Gallery, Prince George, Canada (2007-8)
- Arena: the Art of Hockey, Art Gallery of Nova Scotia, Halifax, Canada (2008)
- Desire and Domination: Imagining the Psyche: Davida Kidd and Diana Thorneycroft, Nanaimo Art Gallery, Nanaimo, Canada (2008)
- Who Needs Art When You Have a View Like This (solo), Burnaby Art Gallery, Burnaby, Canada (2010)
- Game On! Art and Hockey, Richard F. Brush Gallery, St. Lawrence University, Canton, New York, USA (2013)
- From Time to Time: 50th Anniversary Print Portfolio, University of Alberta FAB Gallery, Edmonton, Alberta (2015)
- Views From the Southbank III: Information, Objects, Mappings, Surrey Art Gallery, Surrey, Canada (2015)
- High Resolution: Half a Century (1966-2015) of the International Print Triennial in Krakow, MODEM Centre for Modern and Contemporary Arts, Debrecen, Hungary (2016)
- Tales Untold: Chris Reid, Rebecca Chaperon, Davida Kidd, The Reach Gallery Museum, Abbotsford, Canada (2018)
- 9th Annual International Printmaking Biennial, Douro, Portugal (2018)
