= Magsamen =

Magsamen is a surname. Notable people with the surname include:

- Kelly Magsamen, American foreign policy and national security advisor
- Sandra Magsamen (born 1959), American author, artist, art therapist, and designer
- Susan Huganir Magsamen (born 1959), American academic, author, and entrepreneur

== See also ==
- Hillerbrand+Magsamen
