= Suchi Reddy =

Indian-American Architect and Artist

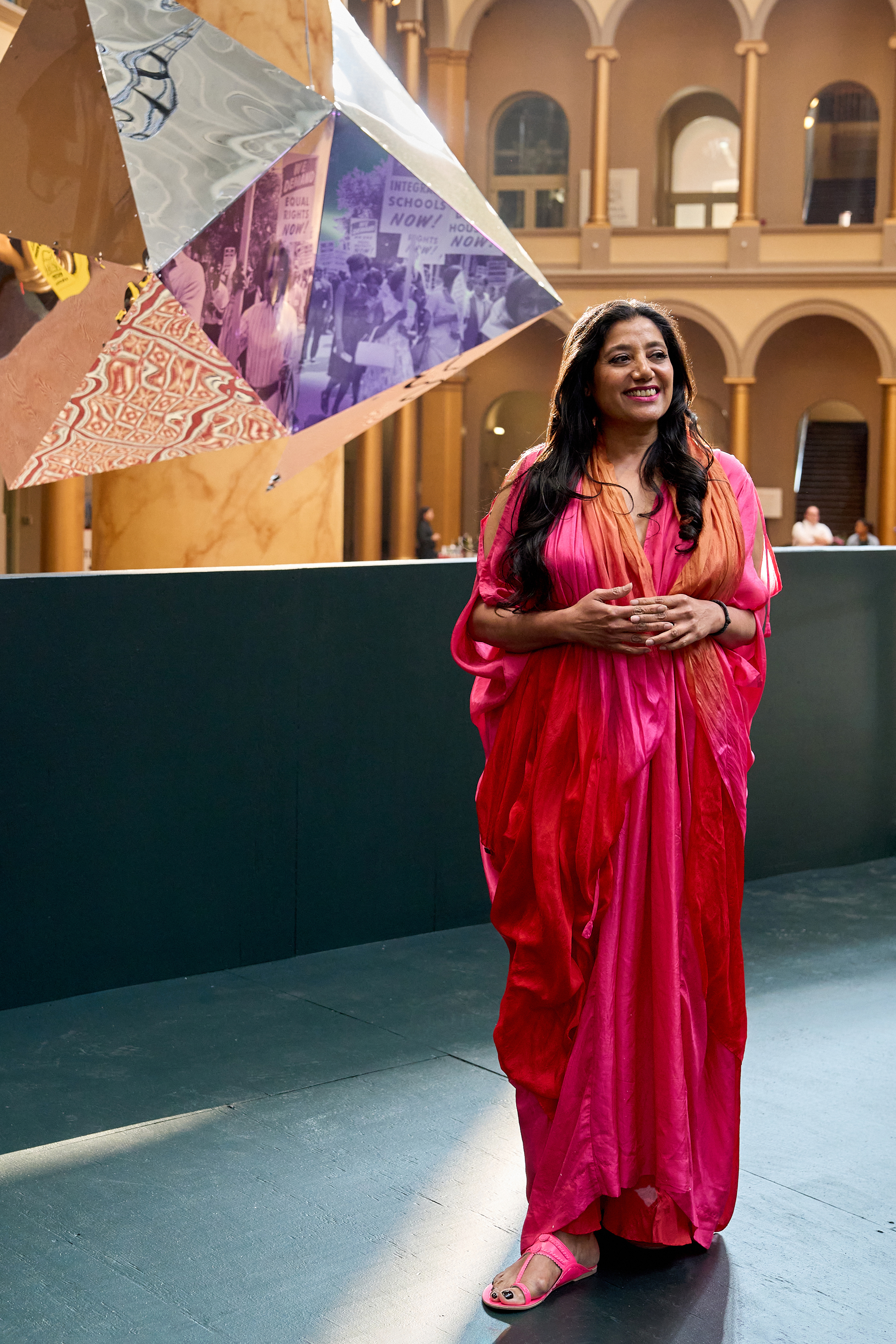
- Suchi Reddy at the National Building Museum in Washington, DC
- Born: Chennai, India
- Education: University of Detroit Mercy
- Occupations: Architect, Artist
- Notable work: Google Store NYC, me + you, The Connective Project, Cherokee Residence
- Awards: Times Square Valentine Heart Design Competition (2019), Architizer A+ Awards (2018), NYCxDesign Awards (2018, 2022)

Suchi Reddy is an Indian-American architect and artist. She is the founder of Reddymade, an architecture, design and public art practice based in New York City. Select projects include "me + you," the Google Store NYC, the Connective Project, the Cherokee Residence, the Salt Point Residence, and the amenities in the Estates at Acqualina.

== Biography ==
Raised in Chennai, India, Reddy studied architecture at Anna Universityin India. She moved to the United States at age 18 and earned her Bachelor of Science in Architecture from the University of Detroit Mercy. She has worked at Arquitectonica, Polshek Partnership, and Gabellini Sheppard.

Reddy founded her firm, Reddymade, in 2002 with a focus on architecture and neuroaesthetics. She has described her mantra as "form follows feeling," which focuses on how design can impact wellbeing.

Reddy teaches at Columbia University's Graduate School of Architecture, Planning and Preservation. In 2019, she was appointed Plym Distinguished Visiting Professor at the architecture school of the University of Illinois School of Architecture.

== Neuroaesthetics ==
Reddy's work is guided by the mantra "form follows feeling," which examines architecture's relationship with the body. She has written and lectured about architecture and neuroaesthetics. In 2019, she designed the installation, "A Space for Being," in collaboration with Google executive Ivy Ross, Muuto, and Susan Magsamen at the International Arts + Mind Lab at Johns Hopkins University for Salone del Mobile in Milan to explore physiological response to the stimuli of our designed environment.

== Select projects ==
- Look Here, summer installation at the National Building Museum, Washington D.C. (2023)
- Shaped by Air, inspired by the Lexus Electrified Sport Concept, ICA Miami sculpture garden, Miami, FL (2022)
- me + you, in collaboration with Amazon Web Services, Smithsonian Arts + Industries Building, Washington, D.C. (2021)
- Google Store NYC, New York (2021)
- Salt Point Residence, in collaboration with Ai Weiwei, Salt Point, NY (2021)
- X is for Love, Times Square New York (2019)
- A Space for Being, in collaboration with Google, Muuto, and Johns Hopkins University, Salone del Mobile Milan (2019)
- The Connective Project, Prospect Park New York (2017)
- Yulman Residence, Sunset Island, Miami Florida (2018)
- Cherokee Residence, Beverly Hills, California (2019)
- Venice Beach Residence, Venice, California

== Awards and honors ==
- 2023 Interior Design Best of Year Award, Exhibit/Installation (Look Here)
- 2022 NYCxDesign Environmental Impact (Google Store NYC)
- 2021 Global Design & Architecture Design Award (Google Store NYC)
- 2019 Times Square Valentine Heart Design competition
- 2018 Architizer A+ Jury and Popular Vote Awards (Cherokee Residence)
- 2018 NYCxDesign Awards for Architectural Installation (The Connective Project)
- 2018 AIA Brooklyn + Queens Design Awards, Excellence Award/Pro Bono (The Connective Project)
- 2018 Excelsior Awards for Public Architecture Award of Merit in Public Art (The Connective Project)
