= AABC =

AABC may refer to:

- Accrediting Association of Bible Colleges
- American Amateur Baseball Congress
- Australian Army Band Corps
- AABC, a pattern of musical phrases forming an incomplete repetition
- aabc, a type of hand based on suit in poker probability
- Arthur Andersen Business Consulting, a unit formed by the accounting firm Arthur Andersen
- Alabama Aquatic Biodiversity Center
- Anger-Aggression Bidirectional-Causation, a psychologic theory by Vladimir J. Konečni
