= Susan Huganir Magsamen =

American academic (born 1959)

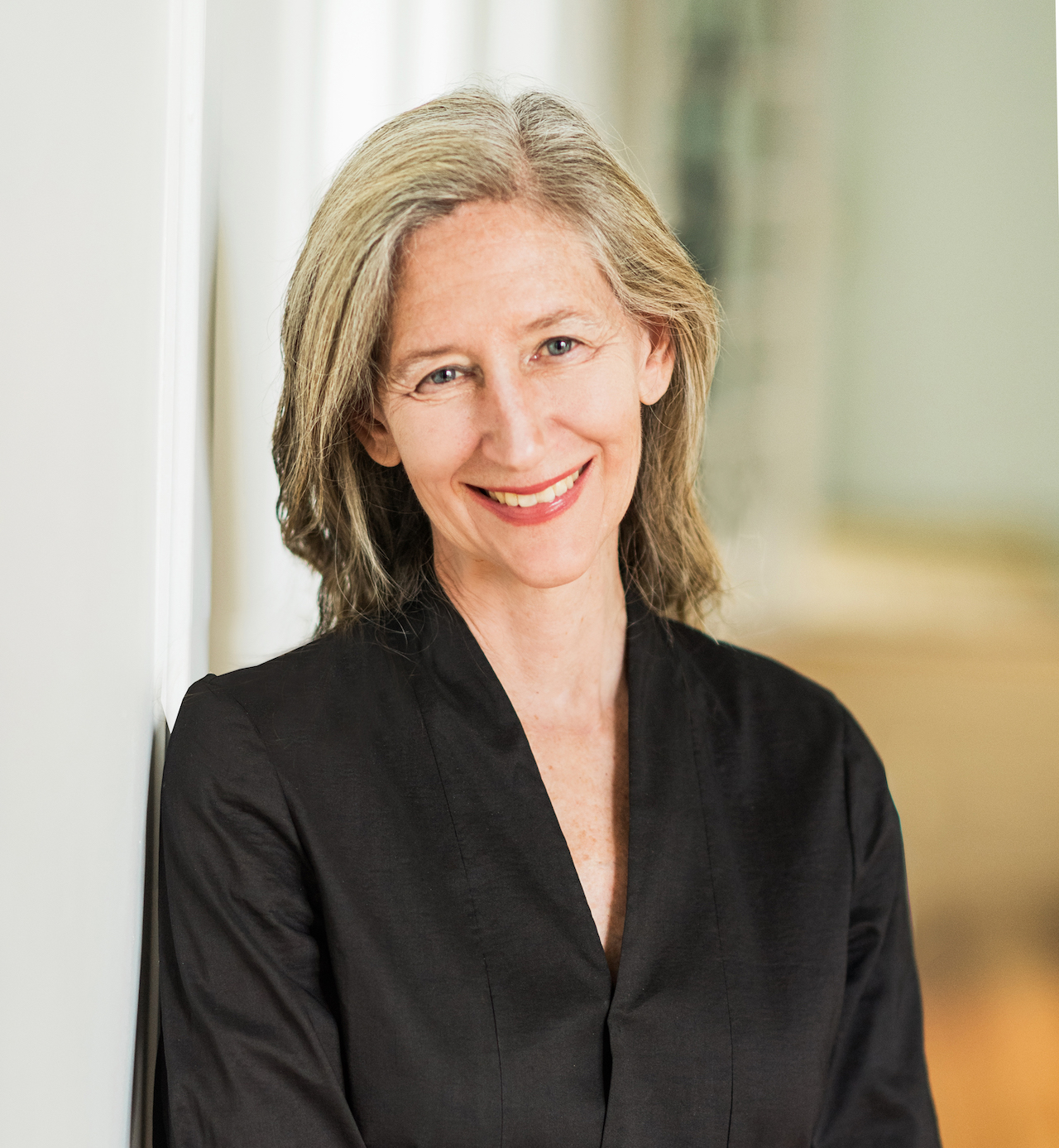
- Magsamen in 2021
- Born: August 22, 1959 (age 67); Baltimore, Maryland, U.S.
- Education: Towson University (BA); Johns Hopkins University (MA)
- Spouse: Richard L. Huganir
- Children: Samuel Stuart Garrett; Benjamin Powell Garrett; Nicole Rambo Huganir; Adam Scott Huganir
- Awards: Fellow of the Royal Society of Arts
- Scientific career
- Fields: Neuroaesthetics; Education and Learning; Art
- Workplaces: Johns Hopkins University

Susan Huganir Magsamen (born August 22, 1959) is an American academic, author and entrepreneur. She serves as executive director of the International Arts + Mind Lab, part of the Brain Science Institute at the Johns Hopkins School of Medicine. She also co-directs the Aspen Institute's NeuroArts BluePrint. She is a Fellow of the Royal Society of Arts and the creator of Impact Thinking, an interdisciplinary research model that combines the arts, science and health. Susan is the co-author of the New York Times bestselling book Your Brain on Art: How the Arts Transform Us with Ivy Ross, which shares the science behind how making and engaging with art amplifies our physical and mental health, helps us to learn, and encourages stronger communities.

== Background ==
Magsamen was born in Baltimore, Maryland, and studied creative arts and therapeutic recreation at Shepherd University from 1977 to 1979. She received a Bachelor of Arts in Communications Studies from Towson University in 1982, and a Master of Advanced Study from Johns Hopkins University in 1986. She has four sisters, one of whom is her twin, the artist and author Sandra Magsamen. Susan has described being drawn to the interaction of art, creativity, health and well-being in the fourth grade, when she observed how painting helped her twin sister recover from a broken leg.

Magsamen is married to Richard L. Huganir, Director of the Department of Neuroscience, Bloomberg Distinguished Professor and co-director of the Brain Science Institute at the Johns Hopkins School of Medicine. They have four children, and live in the Baltimore area.

== Career ==
Magsamen credits her first job, in educational programming with Maryland Public Television, with introducing her to interdisciplinary learning. As she noted in a 2019 interview with Forbes, “collaboration is key. The biggest problems in the world aren’t going to be solved by one discipline—you solve problems by bringing disciplines together and having unique voices at a table, working together against a problem.”

Magsamen is the founder and executive director of the International Arts + Mind Lab (or IAM Lab), a center for applied neuroaesthetics at the Brain Science Institute (BSI), Johns Hopkins School of Medicine, that was first conceived at the BSI's Science of the Arts Symposium in 2010. Officially founded in 2016, the IAM Lab is dedicated to exploring the scientific relationship between aesthetics and the brain, or what Magsamen has called “the study of how our brain and biology change [from exposure to] the arts.” Known as neuroaesthetics, this emerging field was first defined by neurobiologist Semir Zeki in 1999. The IAM Lab also hopes to advance the new field of applied neuroaesthetics through interdisciplinary collaboration, scientific research and support for arts-based solutions to health and learning challenges. Magsamen's Impact Thinking model studies how brain science and interdisciplinary research in the arts, architecture and music can be translated into better practice, or used to solve problems in health, well-being and learning.

In April, 2019 Magsamen collaborated with Google executive Ivy Ross, Christian Grosen and Suchi Reddy to promote awareness of neuroaesthetics through an exhibit at the Salone del Mobile in Milan. A Space for Being explored the physiological effects of spatial design by combining science with art and wellness. Using digital wristbands, it tracked visitors’ responses to three rooms whose furniture, lighting, artwork, music, scent and materials were designed to elicit different moods and sensory experiences. Other initiatives based on Impact Thinking include a 2019 partnership with Drexel University exploring the use of virtual reality in creative art therapies to promote mental health, and another partnership with Johns Hopkins’ Kennedy Krieger Institute to use neuroaesthetics to create multi-sensory pediatric care rooms tailored to individual patients. Magsamen has said that one of her future goals is to help “health care professionals see the value in covering the costs of prescribing arts as medicine. We can change the world if we get folks to see that arts are as important as exercise.”

Magsamen holds a faculty position in the Department of Neurology at Johns Hopkins and directs Interdisciplinary Partnerships at the Johns Hopkins School of Medicine Brain Science Institute In 2019 she became the co-director of the NeuroArts Blueprint, a partnership between the IAM Lab, the Johns Hopkins School of Medicine and the Aspen Institute that aims to demonstrate how the scientific study of art can inform human health and wellbeing.

Magsamen is also the creator of two former learning-based companies that encouraged creativity and hands-on skills in young children: Curiosity Kits (founded in 1988 and discontinued in the 1990s) and Curiosityville (founded in 2012 and retired in the late 2010s) She has argued that “we will not be able to solve big issues in society without playing in the sand and exploring, creating and experimenting.”

== Books ==
- Magsamen, Susan (2023). Your Brain on Art: How the Arts Transform Us. New York: Random House. ISBN 978-0593449233.
- Magsamen, Susan (2010). The Classic Treasury of Childhood Wonders: Favorite Adventures, Stories, Poems, and Songs for Making Lasting Memories. Washington, DC: National Geographic Society. ISBN 978-1426307157.
- Magsamen, Susan (2009). The 10 Best of Everything Families. Washington, DC: National Geographic Society. ISBN 978-1426203947.
- Magsamen, Susan (2007). Family Night! (FamilyStories). New York: Barnes & Noble. ISBN 978-1402748226.
- Magsamen, Susan (2007). Making Spirits Bright (FamilyStories). New York: Barnes & Noble. ISBN 978-1402748257.
- Magsamen, Susan (2007). Tooth Fairy Time (FamilyStories). New York: Barnes & Noble. ISBN 978-1402748233.
- Magsamen, Susan (2007). Nighty Night (FamilyStories). New York: Barnes & Noble. ISBN 978-1402748240.
- Magsamen, Susan (2007). My Two Homes (FamilyStories). New York: Barnes & Noble. ISBN 978-1402748264.

== Public engagement ==
Magsamen has appeared on The Marc Steiner Show, TED ReThinking with Adam Grant, Science Friday, Universe of Art, and BrainStorm. She has given interviews to Forbes, Financial Times, The Washington Post, The Baltimore Sun, and the BBC, among others. She has also been a speaker at the Brookings Institution, the Centre for Conscious Design, the Society for Neuroscience, the BrainMind Summit, and the Commonwealth Club of World Affairs.

== Honors ==
Magsamen is a Fellow of the Royal Society of the Arts. Her books and other educational materials have been recognized by hundreds of educational awards.
