= Applied aesthetics =

Application of the philosophy of beauty

Applied aesthetics is the application of the branch of philosophy of aesthetics to cultural constructs. In a variety of fields, artifacts (whether physical or abstract) are created that have both practical functionality and aesthetic affectation. In some cases, aesthetics is primary, and in others, functionality is primary. At best, the two needs are synergistic, in which "beauty" makes an artifact work better, or in which more functional artifacts are appreciated as aesthetically pleasing. This achievement of form and function, of art and science, of beauty and usefulness, is the primary goal of design, in all of its domains.

== Architecture and interior design ==
Although structural integrity, cost, the nature of building materials, and the functional utility of the building contribute heavily to the design process, architects can still apply aesthetic considerations to buildings and related architectural structures. Common aesthetic design principles include ornamentation, edge delineation, texture, flow, solemnity, symmetry, color, granularity, the interaction of sunlight and shadows, transcendence, and harmony. These aesthetic considerations form one branch of the philosophy of architecture.

Interior designers, being less constrained by structural concerns, have a wider variety of applications to appeal to aesthetics. They may employ color, color harmony, wallpaper, ornamentation, furnishings, fabrics, textures, lighting, various floor treatments, as well as adhere to aesthetic concepts such as feng shui.

== Digital art ==
A new art form struggling for acceptance is digital art, a by-product of computer programming that raises new questions about what truly constitutes art. Although paralleling many of the aesthetics in traditional media, digital art can additionally draw upon the aesthetic qualities of cross-media tactile relationships; interactivity; autonomous generativity; complexity and interdependence of relationships; suspense; and playfulness.

Artists working in this type of art are often forced to justify their use of a computer rather than a traditional medium, leading to, like the debate over Warhol's "Brillo Pad Boxes", a question of what constitutes art.

The criticisms of digital art are many. For example, graphics programs allow perfect shading to be achieved with little to no effort. In other types of programs, there is a sense that because of the variety of tools, filters, distortions, etc., that an artist has a veritable image factory at their disposal. The various criticisms ultimately come down to the issue of "what effort is the artist putting into their work?"

The 3d art community frequently references that while the programs they utilize render and shade the objects, their efforts are more akin to the sculptor or architect, presenting an aesthetically arranged, lighted, and textured scene. The users of the other programs such as Photoshop or Gimp point out that while they may have many tools at their disposal, the art itself must be that much more detailed and imaginative to stand out. In both cases there is the challenge of overcoming the barriers of limited technology and the lack of direct contact with one's medium.

== Education and social sciences ==
Educators are also interested in how aesthetic designs influence the ways that students think and learn. Some historical figures like John Dewey have approached education through aesthetics. More recently, Elliot Eisner and jan jagodzinski have reopened the debate. Other researchers with postmodern or poststructural influences have done the same, these include Cleo H. Cherryholmes and Michel Foucault. Aesthetics in education has been linked to pragmatism as well as other areas of curriculum development and implementation.

== Fashion design ==
Fashion designers use a variety of techniques to allow people to express the truth about their unconscious minds by way of their clothing. To create wearable personality designers use fabric, cut, colour, scale, references to the past, texture, color harmony, distressing, transparency, insignia, accessories, beading and embroidery. It is also used to find the average size of things, to make a product suitable for a high number of customers.

== Film, television, and video ==
Film combines many diverse disciplines, each of which may have their own rules of aesthetics. The aesthetics of cinematography are closely related to still photography, but the movement of the subject(s), or the camera and the intensities, colors, and placement of the lighting are highly important. Sound recording, editing, and mixing are other, highly important areas of film, often closely related with the musical score. As in Theatre, art direction, in the design of the sets and shooting locations also applies, as well as costume design and makeup. All of these disciplines are closely inter-twined and must be brought together by the aesthetic sensibilities of the director.

Montage, or editing is probably the one discipline unique to film, video, and television. The timing, rhythm and progression of shots form the ultimate composition of the film. This procedure is one of the most critical element of post production, and incorporates sound editing and mixing, as well as the design and execution of digital special effects.

In the case of a video installation, the method of presentation becomes critical. The work may be screened on a simple monitor, projected on a wall or other surface, or incorporated into a larger sculptural installation. A video installation may also involve sound, with similar considerations to be made based on speaker design and placement, volume, and tone.

== Industrial design ==
Industrial Design: Designers need many aesthetic qualities to improve the marketability of manufactured products: smoothness, shininess/reflectivity, texture, pattern, curviness, color, simplicity, usability, velocity, symmetry, naturalness, and modernism. The staff of the Design Aesthetics section focuses on design, appearance and the way people perceive products. Design aesthetics is interested in the appearance of products; the explanation and meaning of this appearance is studied mainly in terms of social and cultural factors. The distinctive focus of the section is research and education in the field of sensory modalities in relation to product design. These fields of attention generate design baggage that enables engineers to design products, systems, and services, and match them to the correct field of use.

== Information technology ==
Aesthetics in information technology has focused upon the study of human-computer interaction and creating user-friendly devices and software applications. Software itself has aesthetic dimensions ("software aesthetics"), as do information-technology-mediated processes and experiences such as computer video games and virtual reality simulations. Digital culture is a distinct aesthetic to judge the appeal of digital environments such as Web browsers, websites, and icons, as well as visual and aural art produced exclusively with digital technologies. The notion of cyberspace has sometimes been linked to the concept of the sublime.

Aesthetics in information technology do also apply to the act of designing software itself. Numerous programmers profess to experiencing a dimension of elegance in the functionality and structuring of software at the source code level. For example, a short, powerful expression that clearly expresses the intent of the code can be considered "beautiful" to the poor programmer charged with maintaining said code. This contrasts with code that is (as code all too often is) short, cryptic, unclear, and unnecessarily "clever". In-line documentation, while not strictly code, can be considered something a programmer would need to be good at in order to write beautiful code. Correctly done, documentation can accentuate the effect of beautiful code, when it is clear, concise, explains the intent of the programmer, and expands the understanding that one can gain by simply looking at the code. Comments that are redundant (only explain what the code already explains), cryptic, and overly long or short can detract from beautiful code. Aesthetics in programming can also have a practical level: Under the right conditions, elegant code can run faster and more efficiently, and (most importantly) be less prone to errors.

Critics of this would say that the need to justify "good design" by reference to "cost savings" means that "good design" isn't "art" insofar as art is autonomous, and many aestheticians would have to say that art emerges in applications only in excess of cost savings. In information technology, theorists of "user friendliness" have to justify their "user friendly" applications and often disregard basic statistics when most users like a system, but a significant minority hate it.

That is, they may discard the standard deviation of their data in order to sell a good design for the best price, and this has nothing to do with art insofar as art is a useful signifier (if you cost-justify everything you are a businessman and not an artist).

A folk phenomenon among real programmers is in fact their frequent hatred of practice described in books as best practice and good design. A Marxist theory of industrial "art" would ascribe this to alienation, in which subaltern programmers never produce code they own in any meaningful sense, with the problem that the same sort of alienation, soldiering, and bloody-mindedness appeared, it seems, in Soviet computing shops.

The most sophisticated writings on the topic of aesthetics are to be found in the late Edsger Wybe Dijkstra's corpus of papers and notes on computing: in Dijkstra, the art is real, but Ying with respect to the Yang of applications; Dijkstra seemed to have refused any analysis of programming as other than applied mathematics and, strange to say, never pursued what Adorno (the midcentury theoretician of whom Dijkstra was apparently unaware) called a purely culinary elegance...despite the protests of others that his work was "hard to digest", in Adorno's words not very culinary.

Dijkstra's beauty refused the notion of accessibility as do many "artistic" works ancient and modern: it was hard as is the Grosse Fuge, Beethoven's syncopated and neo-primitive late movement. In fact, no aesthetician makes "user friendliness" canonical and necessary in a work of art, strange to say in an era when supposedly the masses rule through the market; for most art theorists, it is nice if the canaille can enjoy some pretty rondo of Mozart and whistle it on the street, but would deny that this property must be shared by the Masonic prelude and fugue or the Requiem mass.

This makes strange any claim that a programmer making his work "user friendly" to all comers is some sort of artist by virtue of that. For Dijsktra, truth was primary, and beauty the automatic result.

== Landscape design ==
Landscape designers draw upon design elements such as axis, line, landform, horizontal and vertical planes, texture, and scale to create aesthetic variation within the landscape. They may additionally make use of aesthetic elements such as pools or fountains of water, plants, seasonal variance, stonework, fragrance, exterior lighting, statues, and lawns.

=== Environmental Applications ===
Lawn monoculture in the United States was historically influenced by English gardens and manor-house landscapes, but its inception into the American landscape is fairly recent. Aesthetics drove the evolution of the residential green areas, with turfgrass becoming a popular addition to many American homes. Turfgrass is a nonnative species and requires high levels of maintenance. However, the drive for its widespread use primarily came from social pressures. At the local level, governments and organizations have begun to take monocultural practices into their own hands (think Homeowner Associations). Various concerns for maintenance of private property have developed, from maintaining aesthetics to real estate value. In fact, many residents have begun to associate the condition of one’s lawn with one’s character. Disagreements in residential maintenance of weeds, lawns, etc, have resulted in civil cases or even direct aggression against neighbors.

== Literature ==
In poetry, short stories, novels and non-fiction, authors use a variety of techniques to appeal to our aesthetic values. Depending on the type of writing an author may employ rhythm, illustrations, structure, time shifting, juxtaposition, dualism, imagery, fantasy, suspense, analysis, humor/cynicism, and thinking aloud.

== Cartography/Map Design ==
Aesthetics in cartography relates to the visual experience of map reading and can take two forms: affective responses to the map itself as an aesthetic object (e.g., considering a map to be "beautiful," or "interesting," or "frustrating"), and affective responses to the geographic subject of the map (e.g., considering the mapped landscape as "beautiful" or "someplace I want to visit").

Like other forms of design, almost all maps are created to serve a practical purpose: to inform, to explain, to discover, to guide, to convince. To some, aesthetics may seem of secondary concern, especially in the era of Geographic information systems and web mapping, when maps are created by the millions every day, to be used temporarily then discarded. However, it still serves an important, even practical purpose. Map readers are more likely to pick up a beautiful map than an ugly one, and are likely to spend more time using a map that is pleasing to look at. In turn, there is an aesthetic appeal for maps that look authoritative, clear, and well-crafted. Consequently, products such as Google Maps have undergone multiple major revisions to their design to make them not only more accurate and more useful, but more attractive, and thus more competitive.

Cartographers make aesthetic judgments when designing maps to ensure that the content forms a clear expression of the theme(s). Antique maps are perhaps especially revered due to their aesthetic value, which may seem to be derived from their styles of ornamentation. As such, aesthetics are often wrongly considered to be a by-product of design. If it is taken that aesthetic judgments are produced within a certain social context, they are fundamental to the cartographer's symbolisation and as such are integral to the function of maps.

== Marketing ==
As opposed to Industrial Design, which focuses on the aesthetic qualities of consumer products (see above), the use of aesthetics in marketing concerns itself with the "trade dress" of a product, such as its branding, its commercial representation, or the reputation of its producer. Marketing professionals may tickle the consumer's aesthetic appreciation of sophistication, color-harmony, stylishness, catchy jingles, slogans, craftsmanship, or the related perceived experiences associated with product consumption.

== Mathematics ==
The aesthetics of mathematics are often compared with music and poetry. Hungarian mathematician Paul Erdős expressed his views on the indescribable beauty of mathematics when he said "Why are numbers beautiful? It's like asking why is Beethoven's Ninth Symphony beautiful." Math appeals to the "senses" of logic, order, novelty, elegance, and discovery. Some concepts in math with specific aesthetic application include sacred ratios in geometry, the intuitiveness of axioms, the complexity and intrigue of fractals, the solidness and regularity of polyhedra, and the serendipity of relating theorems across disciplines. There is a developed aesthetic and theory of humor in mathematical humor.

== Music ==
Some of the aesthetic elements expressed in music include lyricism, harmony, hypnotism, emotiveness, temporal dynamics, volume dynamics, resonance, playfulness, color, subtlety, elatedness, depth, and mood (see musical development). Aesthetics in music are often believed to be highly sensitive to their context: what sounds good in modern rock music might sound terrible in the context of the early baroque age.

== Neuroesthetics ==
Cognitive science has also considered aesthetics, with the advent of neuroesthetics, pioneered by Semir Zeki, which seeks to explain the prominence of great art as an embodiment of biological principles of the brain, namely that great works of art capture the essence of things just as vision and the brain capture the essentials of the world from the ever-changing stream of sensory input. See also Vogelkop bowerbird.

== Performing arts ==
Performing arts appeal to our aesthetics of storytelling, grace, balance, class, timing, strength, shock, humor, costume, irony, beauty, drama, suspense, and sensuality. Whereas live stage performance is usually constrained by the physical reality at hand, film performance can further add the aesthetic elements of large-scale action, fantasy, and a complex interwoven musical score. Performance art often consciously mixes the aesthetics of several forms. Role-playing games are sometimes seen as a performing art with an aesthetic structure of their own, called RPG theory.

== Two-dimensional and plastic arts ==
Aesthetic considerations within the visual arts are usually associated with the sense of vision. A painting or sculpture, however, is also perceived spatially by recognized associations and context, and even to some extent by the senses of smell, hearing, and touch. The form of the work can be subject to an aesthetic as much as the content.

In painting, the aesthetic convention that we see a three-dimensional representation rather than a two-dimensional canvas is so well understood that most people do not realize that they are making an aesthetic interpretation. This notion is the basis of abstract impressionism.

In the United States during the postwar period, the "push-pull" theories of Hans Hofmann, positing a relation between color and perceived depth, strongly influenced a generation of prominent abstract painters, many of whom studied under Hofmann and were generally associated with abstract expressionism. Hofmann's general attitude toward abstraction as virtually a moral imperative for the serious painter was also extremely influential.

Some aesthetic effects available in visual arts include variation, juxtaposition, repetition, field effects, symmetry/asymmetry, perceived mass, subliminal structure, linear dynamics, tension and repose, pattern, contrast, perspective, 3 dimensionality, movement, rhythm, unity/Gestalt, matrixiality and proportion.

== Urban life ==
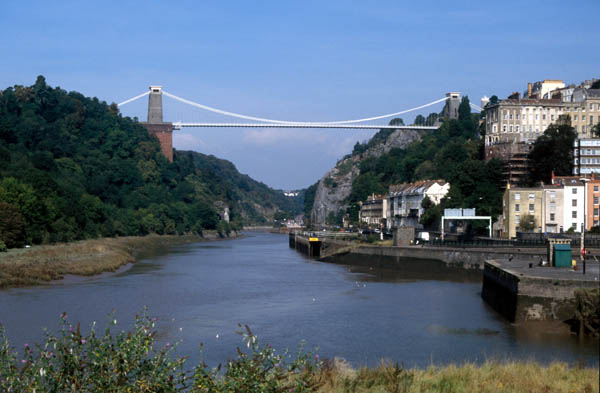
Towns and cities have been planned with aesthetics in mind; here in Bristol (England), 19th century private sector development was designed to appear attractive.

Over half of mankind lives in cities; although it represents a lofty goal, planning and achieving urban aesthetics (beautification) involves a good deal of historical luck, happenstance, and indirect gestalt. Nevertheless, aesthetically pleasing cities share certain traits: ethnic and cultural variety, numerous microclimates that promote a diversity of vegetation, sufficient public transportation, Public art and freedom of expression in the community in the forms of sculpture, graffiti and street art, a range of build-out (or zoning) that creates both densely and sparsely populated areas, scenic neighboring geography (oceans or mountains), public spaces and events such as parks and parades, musical variety through local radio or street musicians, and enforcement of laws that abate noise, crime, and pollution.

== Website design ==
Recent research suggests that the visual aesthetics of computer interface is a strong determinant of users’ satisfaction and pleasure. Exploratory and confirmatory factor analyses found that users’ perceptions consist of different main dimensions. Lavie and Tractinsky found two main dimension which they termed “classical aesthetics” and “expressive aesthetics”.

- Classical Aesthetics – pertains to aesthetic notions that presided from antiquity until the 18th century. These notions emphasize orderly and clear design and are closely related to many of the design rules advocated by usability experts.
- Expressive Aesthetics – created by the designers’ creativity and originality and by the ability to break design conventions.

While both dimensions of perceived aesthetic are drawn from a pool of aesthetic judgments, they are clearly distinguishable from each other. In a recent study Moshagen and Thielsch found four core dimensions of website aesthetics:

- Simplicity
- Diversity
- Colors
- Craftsmanship

Simplicity and diversity have repeatedly been treated as formal parameters of aesthetic objects throughout the history of empirical aesthetics. Colors are a very critical property of aesthetic objects. Craftsmanship addresses the skillful and coherent integration of the relevant design dimensions. While simplicity is highly correlated to classical aesthetics as mentioned by Lavie and Tractinsky, the other three factors could be treated as deeper differentiation of expressive aesthetics.

Best practices for aesthetic website design

- Create visual clues based on groupings; related items or links are grouped together while unrelated items are separated.
- Use headings and subheadings to allow visual scanning of content.
- Use headings, subheadings, font sizes, bold fonts and italic fonts in proportion to the importance of the item.
- Align elements on a page so that they are all visually connected; size all elements on the page to create balance and unity; nothing should look out of place unless you have a specific reason for the effect.
- Choose a font style that supports the site atmosphere and stick to it; limit styles to 2 at the most.
- Use images and photos for visual appeal and to communicate ideas.
- Use one set of design elements across your website.

Website design aesthetics and credibility

Website design influences user's perception of site credibility. One of the factors that influences whether users stay or go on a web page is the page aesthetics. Another reason may involve a user's judgment about the site's credibility. Findings indicate that when the same content is presented using different levels of aesthetic treatment, the content with a higher aesthetic treatment was judged as having higher credibility. We call this the amelioration effect of visual design and aesthetics on content credibility. Holmes suggests that this effect is operational within the first few seconds in which a user views a web page. Given the same content, a higher aesthetic treatment will increase perceived credibility.
