= Vladimir J. Konečni =

Russian and Serbian psychologist

- Владимир Конечни
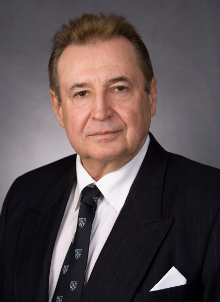
- Konečni in 2008
- Born: October 27, 1944 (age 81); Belgrade, Yugoslavia (now Serbia)
- Citizenship: Serbia and United States
- Education: University of Toronto; University of Belgrade
- Known for: Studies of: judicial decision making; human aggressive behavior; the "golden ratio"; emotion in visual art and music; peak aesthetic experiences
- Awards: John Simon Guggenheim Fellowship (1979); Deutscher Akademischer Austauschdienst (DAAD, 1987)
- Scientific career
- Fields: Psychology, Social psychology, Emotion, Cognitive psychology, Legal psychology, Aesthetics, Psychology of art, Psychology of music
- Workplaces: University of California, San Diego; University of Belgrade
- Doctoral advisors: Daniel E. Berlyne, Anthony N. Doob, Anatol Rapoport

Vladimir J. Konečni (born October 27, 1944) is an American and Serbian psychologist, aesthetician, poet, dramatist, fiction writer, and art photographer, currently an Emeritus Professor of Psychology at the University of California, San Diego.

In psychology, he has carried out influential work in several distinct areas, related to each other by strong methodological concerns. Konečni has conducted laboratory and field studies of human emotion and (physical and verbal) aggression, as well as of altruistic behavior, which have been cited in numerous social psychology textbooks.

Decision-making has been another major research area in which Konečni has been heavily involved (in close collaboration with Dr. Ebbe B. Ebbesen, a long-time colleague at the University of California, San Diego). Most of their work has been devoted to judicial decisions in the criminal justice system, but they have also conducted a number of frequently cited studies of drivers' decisions in real-world settings.

Finally, Konečni has for some forty years worked in the multi-faceted interdisciplinary domains of empirical aesthetics, psychology of art, and music psychology. Notable groups of his studies in these areas have addressed the highly specialized and technical problems of the "golden ratio" (or "golden section") in visual art, the significance of macrostructure in music, peak aesthetic responses, and the relationship between music and emotion.

== Biography ==
Vladimir Konečni grew up in Belgrade (then the capital of Yugoslavia, now of Serbia). His parents were Dora D. Konečni (née Vasić), an economist and banker, and Josip J. Konečni, M.D., a Professor of Medicine at the University of Belgrade.

Konečni is of Serbian, Czech, and Austrian descent.

Konečni is married and has two sons. He lives in San Diego (California, US), Amsterdam (Netherlands), Tallinn (Estonia), and Belgrade (Serbia).

== Career ==
Konečni received his Bachelor of Arts degree in experimental and clinical psychology, and philosophy, from the University of Belgrade in 1969; as an undergraduate, he published three refereed articles.

In 1970, he began graduate studies in experimental and social psychology at the University of Toronto, Canada, receiving an M.A. degree in 1971 and a Ph.D. in 1973. The title of his dissertation was "Experimental Studies of Human Aggression: The Cathartic Effect." Also in 1973, Konečni was appointed Assistant Professor and thus began his 35-year-long uninterrupted association with the Department of Psychology at the University of California, San Diego (Associate Professor in 1978; Professor in 1982; Emeritus Professor in 2008).

In the period after 1973, he was at various times a Visiting Professor at a number of renowned universities outside the United States, including the London School of Economics, Sydney University, Hebrew University Jerusalem, University of Cape Town, Universiteit van Amsterdam, and Freie Universität Berlin. In the course of his career so far, Konečni has given colloquia on his research at some 150 universities on all continents.

=== Negative emotions, physiological arousal, and aggressive behavior ===
In the period 1972 to 1984, Konečni carried out, in parallel, field experiments on altruistic behavior, and laboratory and field studies on human physical and verbal aggression.

With regard to aggression, on the basis of experimental findings, Konečni distinguished among physical, verbal, play, fantasy and other types of aggression, and proposed the existence of bidirectional causation (behavioral and psychophysiological) between the degree of anger (high arousal antagonistically labeled) and the amount of expressed physical aggression.

This theoretical model, which emphasized previously unacknowledged feedback loops, seems to resolve the classical issue of "catharsis". By means of definitional clarity and experimental precision, the model shifts the debate to the many implications of the theoretically sound and empirically observable "cathartic effect", replacing unfocused appeals to sources as diverse as Aristotle's Poetics, Kleinian play therapy, and Albert Bandura's social learning theory. This Anger-Aggression Bidirectional-Causation (AABC) theoretical model parsimoniously accounts for hundreds of experimental findings in the literature. These ideas have also been applied to the role of aversive events in the development of intergroup conflict. Subsequently, Konečni's writing on aggression was extended to the concept of revenge and the expression of anger and violence on the stage and in literature.

=== Legal psychology and judicial decision-making ===
From 1973 to 2011 (the year of Emeritus Professor Ebbe B. Ebbesen's passing), Ebbesen and Konečni worked on judicial decision-making in the criminal justice system. Using quantitative methods, they studied how various participants in the system – judges, prosecutors, defense attorneys, police officers, perpetrators, and others – combine the information available to them into decisions that then become information items for other decision-makers in the system.

This work has been very influential and has been described as "arduous" and "pioneering".

One of its major features has been the comparison of data from experimental simulations to those obtained from archival records and court hearings, often involving the same participants or the same classes of participants (even Superior Court judges participated in the simulations). After their much-cited first article, in 1975, comparing judges' bail-setting decisions in a simulation to those they made in the courtroom, Ebbesen and Konečni published a number of critical methodological articles on the key issue of external validity at many points in the existing research on the legal process, with special reference to jury simulations. This led both to resistance and critiques of the resistance.

In 1982, Konečni and Ebbesen edited a book (dedicated to Egon Brunswik and Kurt Lewin), The Criminal Justice System: A Social-Psychological Analysis, to which they contributed five chapters that outlined their theoretical and methodological viewpoint and addressed several major empirical issues.

One of the chapters presented the results of a large project (over one thousand cases) on judicial sentencing for felonies in California; among other findings, it included a causal analysis that eliminated several popular views of sentencing and highlighted the decisive role of probation officers.

Konečni and Ebbesen, with several students, also conducted empirical investigations of "mentally disordered sex offenders", child-custody decisions, and other issues of societal importance.

They also published extensive critiques of what they believed were mistaken, yet entrenched, views on another major issue in legal psychology, namely, the probative value of prior eyewitness memory research in general, and, specifically, the probative value of psychologists' testimony on eyewitness issues in the cases of exonerations by DNA evidence.

Finally, while working in Konečni's laboratory, G. Kette, an Austrian psychologist, coauthored two articles with Konečni on communication channels and the decoding and integration of cues in judicial decision-making.

=== Empirical aesthetics ===
Throughout his career, Vladimir Konečni has conducted numerous experiments in diverse areas of empirical aesthetics – a field dominated by scientifically oriented psychologists and thus often referred to as psychological or (psycho-) aesthetics (distinct from "aesthetics", which usually refers to philosophical aesthetics). In his first article (1976) in psycho-aesthetics, Konečni, influenced by Daniel Berlyne (one of his graduate-school mentors), successfully combined work on physiological arousal with his own prior work on the "cathartic effect" to study music preference (as a dependent variable). A broad and innovative empirical approach to the study of emotional, mood, and personality antecedents of aesthetic preference and choice in both visual art and music resulted in a number of publications with several American and European graduate students and in various languages. Konečni also wrote two widely cited theoretical articles that addressed (a) the social, emotional, and cognitive determinants of aesthetic preference and (b) the measurable psychological consequences of exposure to aesthetic stimuli, resulting in his formulation of the "Model of Aesthetic Episode" (MAE), which he continued to refine over many years.

==== Visual art ====
Various problems in the area of visual art have been frequently and to this day investigated by Konečni. There have been articles, inspired by MAE, on the interactive effects of visual art and music on emotion and mood, culminating recently (2010, 2015) in two theoretical articles. In addition, he is one of very few psychoaestheticians who has been able to study the creative process in vivo – in his experimental study of portraiture. Konečni has also written about the politics and social ecology of architecture – specifically in Stalin's Soviet Union and Hitler's Germany – and he has recently addressed the aesthetic and social issues regarding new museums, public sculptures, and parks in China, Serbia, and Japan.

==== The "golden ratio" ====
For about ten years (1995–2005), Konečni did a great deal of experimental and theoretical work on the "golden ratio" (or "golden section"). He has repeatedly emphasized the need for distinguishing among the numerous facets of this classical problem in aesthetics and art: Objects in nature vs. objects in art and architecture; the known presence vs. absence of artist's intention in utilizing the ratio; the degree of perceivers' awareness of the ratio in an object and the influence of that awareness, if any, on the object's aesthetic appeal. In his work on paintings, Konečni used many different measures, including the dimensions of the rectangle (frame); the vertical and horizontal bisections of a painting; and the dimensions of significant depicted objects within the painting. He considered the analysis of this variety of measures indispensable and developed several methodological innovations, as well as refinements of the classical Fechnerian ones. Konečni has described the golden ratio as "elusive but detectable", and more likely to influence the results of carefully conducted experiments as part of higher-order interactions than as a main effect; its "contextuality and configurality" make it, he has suggested, comparable to concepts in Zen aesthetics.

==== Neuroaesthetics ====
This new, 21st century, area of research has been considered a branch of empirical aesthetics. Konečni has described its main characteristics, and has critically analyzed some of the claims made by several prominent practitioners, arguing that these claims are exaggerated.

=== Music psychology ===
Konečni has been heavily involved in many aspects of music psychology. In addition to the experimental and theoretical articles on the effects of a variety of factors (including high arousal and other forms of stress) on music preference and choice (for example, among melodies differing in complexity), he developed a new methodology to investigate the theoretically interesting question of "hedonic effects of development vs. chance in resolved and unresolved aural episodes". Furthermore, he contributed to topics of interest to musicians, such as a two-part article that presented a psychological analysis of J. S. Bach's St. Matthew Passion, and another on mode and tempo in Western classical music of the common-practice era. In addition, Konečni wrote about the (Latin) Requiem by the Russian composer Vyacheslav Artyomov and about the playing style of the Canadian pianist Glenn Gould. There are also his three contributions to Music in the Social and Behavioral Sciences: An Encyclopedia by SAGE and a highly technical review of Steven Jan's book The Memetics of Music: A Neo-Darwinian View of Musical Structure and Culture.

==== Macrostructure in music ====
In 1984, Konečni published an article with five experiments on the "elusive effects of artists' 'messages,'" in which "messages" were defined broadly to include, in the two experiments devoted to music, the macrostructure of the pieces, such as the original ordering of the movements in Beethoven's piano sonatas and string quartets. Surprisingly, and contrary to strongly held musicological conventions, even drastic reordering of the movements produced negligible decrements in listeners' enjoyment. Follow-up experiments produced analogous results; a variety of highly esteemed and diverse music pieces were used as research stimuli in this work, including J. S. Bach's Goldberg Variations (diverse ordering of the variations) and Mozart's Symphony in G minor, K. 550 (reordering of the key structural parts of the first movement). These and related experiments were further discussed by Konečni and Karno in 1994, at which time they also summarized the previous debate with musicologists Robert Batt and Nicholas Cook about this research.

==== Music and emotion ====
Konečni has been very active in this area since about 2002. There have been reports of laboratory experiments, extensive theoretical articles in psychology and philosophy journals, and detailed reviews of important books in music-psychology and philosophical-aesthetics journals. Konečni has taken a strong and elaborate – albeit minority – stance against what he regards is an avalanche of insufficiently substantiated claims regarding the relationship between music and emotion, and specifically against the thesis that music causes emotion. In a recent book review, he wrote: "The authors never clearly state something very simple and almost certainly true: some music may, sometimes, in some people, under some circumstances, elicit some psychobiological emotions, but never nearly as powerful as the correspondent emotions in social life." Konečni has based this view on a careful examination of the literature in both music psychology and philosophical aesthetics; on the Prototypical Emotion-Episode Model (PEEM, which he had developed over many years); on his own experimental findings and theoretical work regarding music and emotion; and on what he perceives as widespread neglect of definitional precision and sound methodology in this multidisciplinary field, including in numerous highly cited research articles.

==== Anti-"emotivism" ====
Konečni has written that there is ample evidence to view the majority position about the relationship between music and emotion as an aspect of the socio-culturally prevalent "emotivism", which he distinguished from emotivism in ethics, and defined as "the propensity for excessive insertion of emotion and 'feeling' into both lay and scientific theories of mental life, motives, needs, and daily behavior, in matters artistic and non-artistic". He has suggested that the proclivity for emotional and quasi-emotional excess is related to the prevalent anti-narrative social climate, which often ignores evidence and reason.

Konečni recently published a theoretical article on emotion in the domain of painting and art installations and discussed emotivism in this context also.

=== Peak aesthetic experiences ===
This issue is one in which philosophical aesthetics and psycho-aesthetics are intertwined – in general and in Konečni's extensive work in the past decade. In 2005, he published a theoretical article outlining his "aesthetic trinity theory" (ATT), in which "trinity" refers to a tripartite hierarchical organization of peak aesthetic responses consisting of: (a) physiological thrills (or chills), the most frequent and transient response, and the least pronounced, yet the object of most experimental work; (b) the state of "being moved", considered to be intermediate in depth and duration (the linguistic representation and conceptual structure of this state have recently been empirically investigated by Kuehnast et al., 2014); and (c) aesthetic awe, conceptualized as the peak aesthetic response, exceedingly rare and memorable, and similar to the fundamental emotions in terms of physiological fluctuation, but, unlike them, characterized by existential safety, controllability of danger, and the ease with which it can be "switched off". In ATT, aesthetic awe is viewed as the prototypical response to the "sublime stimulus-in-context" that is external to the perceiver (unlike some positions in philosophy), defined independently of aesthetic awe, and characterized by physical grandeur, great rarity, extraordinary beauty, and novelty, among other criteria). Many aspects of ATT are testable and the results would speak to both philosophical and psychological aestheticians.

=== Work in literature and the arts ===
Vladimir Konečni has for a long time been a prolific poet, dramatist, short-story writer, and art photographer. He has published literary works in English, French, and Serbian. His plays have been performed in a number of countries in North America and Europe, under his direction on two occasions. In addition, he participated in many group art-photography shows in California, and had solo exhibitions in U.S.A. and Serbia. Konečni's work in all of these areas can be accessed gratis at his website.
