= Helmut Leder =

Psychology professor

- Born: 19 December 1963 (age 62); Germany
- Known for: Model of aesthetic appreciation
- Scientific career
- Fields: Psychology
- Workplaces: University of Vienna

Helmut Leder (born 1963 in Bardenberg, Germany) is a Professor of Empirical Aesthetics in Psychology at the Faculty of Psychology of the University of Vienna, in Austria and he is the Head of the Cognitive Sciences Research Hub. He received his Degree Diploma in Psychology in 1990 from the RWTH Aachen University, with a minor in art history, and his Ph.D. in Psychology in 1996 from University of Fribourg and a habilitation from FU Berlin in 2001. His research within the field of experimental aesthetics has aimed to clarify the psychological processes involved in the appreciation of art and aesthetics. From 2014 until 2018, he was the president of the International Association of Empirical Aesthetics.

== Early career and research ==
Leder held diverse positions and was visiting researcher at several institutions, including the University of Stirling for his PhD with a grant from SNF, the Freie Universität Berlin, the Advanced Telecommunication Research Institute International, Kyoto 1997, the University of Vienna in 2003, and shorter research visits at the University of Michigan (Ann Arbor), USC, Los Angeles and at UCSD, San Diego, California and CUNY N.Y and Swinburne University of Technology, Melbourne. He was Visiting Professor in Philosophy of Aesthetics at the Université Paris I - Panthéon-Sorbonne, Paris, France, Sept-Oct. 2017, in 2018, he was Visiting Professor at Keio University, Tokyo; from September to December 2018 he was a Fellow of the Italian Academy of Advanced Studies of America at Columbia University, New York. In spring 2023, he was visiting fellow at Waseda University, Tokyo.

His early research was focused on the perceptual processes that underlie the perception and recognition of human faces, especially the processing of configural and relational information. Within this general domain, he developed a research line into the factors that contribute to evaluating facial attractiveness. As a more applied research topic, he studied the aesthetics of Design on evaluation and usability.

In December 2023 he was co-Editor of a theme issue compiled and edited by Jacopo Frascaroli, Helmut Leder, Elvira Brattico and Sander Van de Cruys on "Art, aesthetics and predictive processing: theoretical and empirical perspectives" in Philosophical Transactions of the Royal Society B: Biological Sciences.

== Current position and research ==
Since 2004 Leder has been a Full Professor at the University of Vienna, and he has been the Head of the Department of Basic Psychological Research and Research Methods from 2004-2020. In 2017 he became the Head of the university`s interdisciplinary Cognitive Sciences Research Hub.

In 2004 he also established the Research Focus on Psychological Aesthetics, the EVAL (Empirical visual Aesthetics research lab, since 2022 EVAlabs) through which, in addition to continuing his prior research lines, he has developed a broad research program on the psychology of aesthetics and the arts. This program was introduced as a cognitive model of the appreciation of art in a paper published in the British Journal of Psychology. This model has served to frame many studies on the cognitive foundations of art, neuroaesthetics, product design, and web design, among other fields. A citation analysis reveals that it is among the most cited of all papers published in the British Journal of Psychology in 2004 and the second most cited since its publication. Leder had (and has) funded research projects to study facial attractiveness, appreciation of art, the brain on art, art interventions in public space, comparative aesthetics, joint research projects with art history at the University of Vienna (Prof. Rosenberg) with Cognitive Biology (Prof. Fusani) with Urban Ethology (Dr. Oberzaucher) and University of Applied Arts, Vienna. His team has also published a number of museum studies, in collaboration with the Museum Belvedere, the Musa, and the Albertina, with Galerie Raum mit Licht, Vienna, and with other international institutions. Part of his research was also featured in the 2018-19 Exhibition Beauty by Sagmeister & Walsh, first in the MAK in Vienna, later in Frankfurt, Hamburg and Bregenz.

== Awards ==
Leder’s research record has been recognized with awards from some of the main professional associations in psychological aesthetics. In 2002 he received the Alexander-Gottlieb-Baumgarten-Award of the International Association of Empirical Aesthetics. In 2004 he received the Daniel E. Berlyne Award of the American Psychological Association (APA), Division 10: Society for the Psychology of Aesthetics Creativity and the Arts. In 2008, he was awarded an International Fellowship of the International Association of Empirical Aesthetics. In 2020 he was awarded the Arnheim Award of the APA American Psychological Association, Div.10, for Outstanding Achievement in Psychology and the Arts. In 2024 he received the Fecher Award of the International Association of Empirical Aesthetics (IAEA) for Outstanding Contributions to Empirical Aesthetics.

== Selected publications ==
- Leder, H. and Bruce, V. (2000). When inverted faces are recognized: The role of configural information in face recognition. Quarterly Journal of Experimental Psychology Section A-Human Experimental Psychology, 53: 513-536.
- Leder, H., Belke, B., Oeberst, A. and Augustin, D. (2004). A model of aesthetic appreciation and aesthetic judgements. British Journal of Psychology, 95: 489-508.
- Leder, H., Goller, J., Forster, M., Schlageter, L., & Paul, M. A. (2017). Face inversion increases attractiveness. Acta Psychologica, 178(July 2017), 25–31. DOI: 10.1016/j.actpsy.2017.05.005
- Pelowski, M., Markey, P., Lauring, J., & Leder, H. (2016). Visualizing the impact of art: An update and comparison of current psychological models of art experience. Frontiers in Human Neuroscience, 10, 160. doi: 10.3389/fnhum.2016.00160
- Leder, H., & Nadal, M. (2014). Ten years of a model of aesthetic appreciation and aesthetic judgments: The aesthetic episode – Developments and challenges in empirical aesthetics. British Journal of Psychology. 443-464. DOI: 10.1111/bjop.1208.
- Pelowski, P., Markey, M., Forster, M., Gerger, G., & Leder, H. (2017). Move me, astonish me… delight my eyes and brain: The Vienna Integrated Model of top–down and bottom–up processes in Art Perception (VIMAP) and corresponding affective, evaluative, and neurophysiological correlates. Physics of Life Reviews.
- Specker, E., Arató, J., & Leder, H. (2023). How are real artworks and reproductions judged? The role of anchoring in empirical investigations of the genuineness effect. Journal of Experimental Social Psychology, 108, 104494
- Leder, H., Hakala, J., Peltoketo, J.-T., Valuch, C., & Pelowski, M. (2022). Swipes and Saves: A Taxonomy of Factors Influencing Aesthetic Assessments and Perceived Beauty of Mobile Phone Photographs. Front. Psychol., 28 February 2022 | https://doi.org/10.3389/fpsyg.2022.786977
- Frascaroli, J., Leder, H., Brattico, E. and Van de Cruys, S. (2023). Aesthetics and predictive processing: grounds and prospects of a fruitful encounter. Philosophical Transactions of the Royal Society B: Biological Sciences, vol. 379, no. 1895.
- Knoll, A., Barriere, T., Weigand, R., Jacobsen, T., Leder, H. & Specker, E. (2024). Experiencing Beauty in Everyday Life. Scientific Reports. 9463. https://doi.org/10.1038/s41598-024-60091-w
- Mikuni, J., Spee, B.T.M., Forlani, G., Leder, H. Scharnowski, F., Nakamura, K., Watanabe, K., Kawabata, H., Pelowski, M., & Steyrl, D.(2024). Cross-cultural comparison of beauty judgments in visual art using machine learning analysis of art attribute predictors among Japanese and German speakers. Scientific Reports, 14, 15948. https://doi.org/10.1038/s41598-024-65088-z.
