= Ello Creation System =

Construction toy manufactured by Mattel, Inc. from 2002 to 2004

- Type: Construction set
- Invented by: Richard Manville
- Company: Mattel, Inc.
- Country: United States
- Availability: 2002–2004
- Slogan: How do you Ello?

Ello Creation System ("Ello") was a construction toy manufactured by the American toy-company Mattel, Inc. between the years 2002-2004. The toy set was created by the American designer Richard Manville. The Ello Creation System was a breakthrough toy created to engage girls in construction play.

== History ==
Ello original play set and parts

Mattel Girls-Division President, Adrienne Fontanella, and Senior VP of Worldwide Girls Design, Ivy Ross, were looking for and exploring new opportunities for girls outside of dolls and traditional doll play-patterns.

In 2001, with the intent to find an opportunity in non-traditional play patterns for girls, Ivy Ross created an in-house think tank (later named Project Platypus). The think tank consisted of a variety of volunteer Mattel employees from inside and outside of the product development department. The think tank's goal was to create a toy that would successfully engage girls in construction play.

Over a series of weeks the think tank divided into a collection of teams and individuals who developed competing concepts for a series of focus group testing and selection by girls and their parents. A concept named Ello created by former Barbie Packaging Creative Director Richard Manville received enthusiastic praise from both girls and parents alike.

Described as a "creation system", the Ello concept (targeted primarily to girls ages 5 to 14) incorporated some traditional elements of craft (including beading and graphic customization), shapes and panels in unique color palettes, a variety of themes, and a flexible intuitive building process. The toys variety and potential combination of parts gave children an opportunity to create characters, jewelry, building structures, decorative accessories, or whatever they could imagine.

Manville began the development of the toy in 2001, working with engineers Jim Mills-Winkler and Armen Danielian to perfect the core construction elements. Designer Stella Jung, inventor/engineer James Molina joined the team in 2002 to develop and expand the line.

The Ello product line won several Oppenheim platinum best toy awards for educational toy excellence in its short three-season life span. However, development of the toy ceased in 2004.

No official explanation exists for the demise of the line.
