= International Association of Empirical Aesthetics =

Organization in France

- Established: 1965; 61 years ago
- Purpose: Aesthetic experience
- President: Oshin Vartanian
- Website: iaea-aesthetics.org

The International Association of Empirical Aesthetics (IAEA) is a psychological organization founded to scientifically investigate the nature of aesthetic experience and aesthetic behavior. The group has members in over 25 countries. IAEA was founded at the first international congress in Paris in 1965 by Daniel Berlyne, Robert Francés, Carmelo Genovese, and Albert Wellek.

== Background ==
Although IAEA has been active for half a century, the domain of experimental aesthetics is much older. It is the second-oldest branch of scientific psychology, traditionally dating from 1876, the year Gustav Theodor Fechner (1801-1887) published his Vorschule der Aesthetik (Preschool of Aesthetics). Fechner, who also is credited with founding psychophysics, established methods for examining aesthetic response to a variety of visual forms, including an exploration of the venerable Golden Section hypothesis. Since the inception of IAEA in 1965, research on empirical aesthetics has continued to progress, with many pioneers prominent in its membership: witness, for instance, such classic books such as Daniel Berlyne's (1971) Aesthetics and Psychobiology, Colin Martindale's (1990) The Clockwork Muse: The Predictability of Artistic Change, or a variety of more recent contributions from IAEA's current members.

== Current situation ==
The International Association of Empirical Aesthetics (IAEA) is an organization of researchers who use scientific methods to investigate aesthetic experience and aesthetic behavior in a wide variety of domains, including encounters with beauty, visual art, music, literature, film, theater, philosophy, and museum behavior. Membership includes individuals from psychology, neuroscience, sociology, museology, art history, philosophy, musicology, and other domains.

Currently, the officers of IAEA are President Oshin Vartanian (Toronto), Secretary Edward Vessel (City College of New York) and Treasurer Rebecca Chamberlain (London). IAEA organizes bi-annual conferences. IAEA is closely associated with the journal Empirical Studies in the Arts. IAEA gives several awards to recognize excellence in empirical research on aesthetics and creativity:

- The Gustav Theodor Fechner Award for Outstanding Contributions to Empirical Aesthetics;
- The Margaret Floy Washburn Award for Outstanding Contribution to Empirical Aesthetics by a Mid-Career Scientist;
- The Alexander Gottlieb Baumgarten Award for Outstanding Contributions of Young Scientists;
- The Robert Francès Award for Most Outstanding Student Research Contribution.

== Former presidents ==
- Robert Francés (1965-1969)
- Daniel Berlyne (1970-1971)
- Irvin Child (1973-1975)
- Pavel Machotka (1983-1985)
- François Molnar (1985-1990)
- Gerald Cupchik (1990-1994)
- Colin Martindale (1994-1998)
- Dean Keith Simonton (1998-2000)
- Paolo Bonaiuto (2000-2004)
- Paul Locher (2004-2008)
- Holger Höge (2008-2012)
- Anjan Chatterjee (2012-2014)
- Helmut Leder (2014-2018)
- Thomas Jacobsen (2018-2022)
