= Ivy Ross =

American business executive and designer

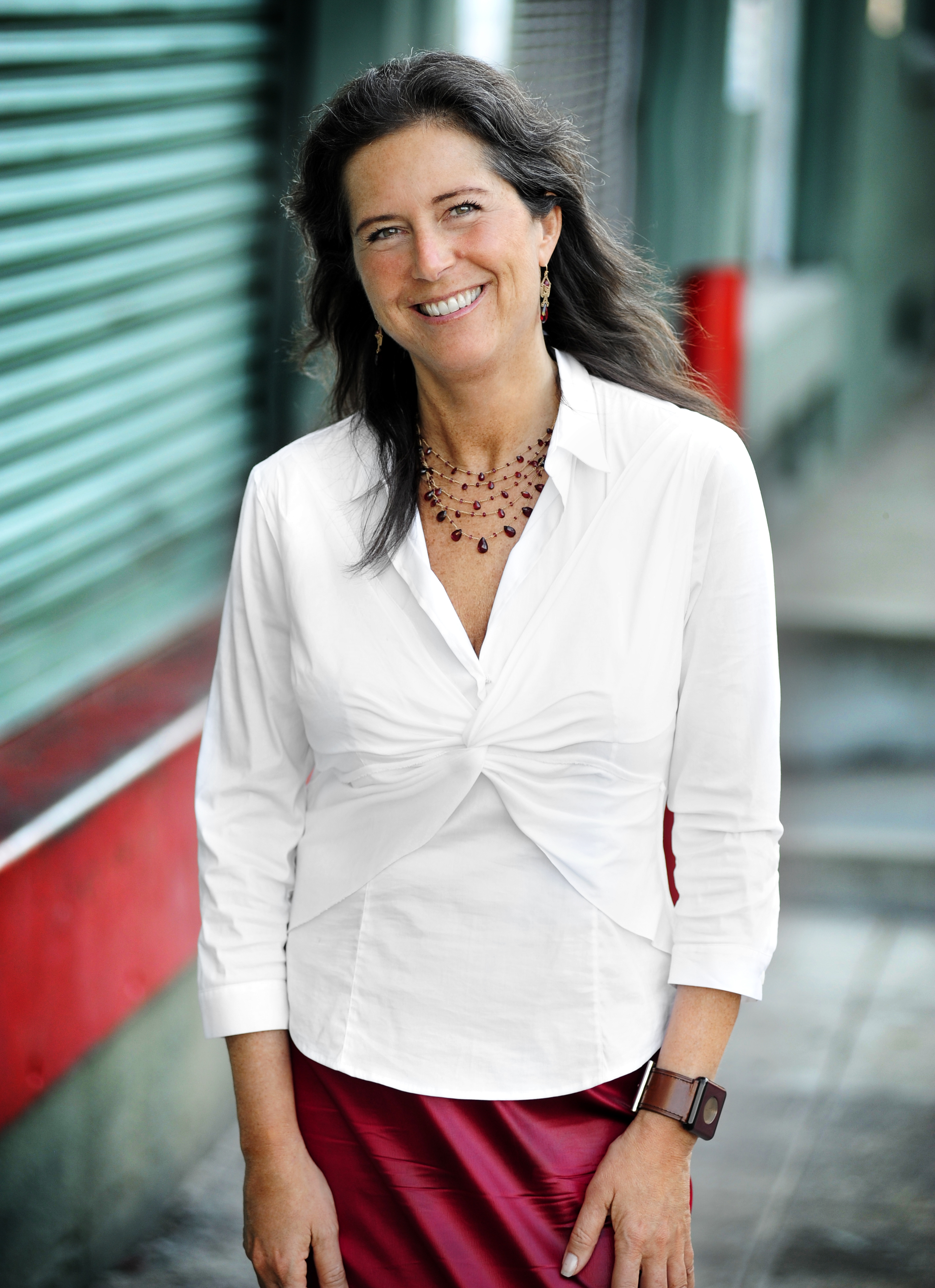
- Born: 1955; Yonkers
- Occupation: Designer, jewelry designer, manager, artistic profession
- Employer: Google
- Spouse(s): Robert Ebendorf
- Position held: chief design officer

Ivy Ross (born 1955) is an American business executive, designer, and the Chief Design Officer for Consumer Devices at Google. She has worked at Google since May 2014; prior to being appointed Chief Design Officer, she led the Google Glass team at Google X.

Ross's metal work in jewelry design is in the permanent collections of 12 international museums, including the Smithsonian in Washington D.C. Ross has crossed into the business world and is a keynote speaker, a member of several boards, and has been called a “creative visionary”.

In February 2019 she was named one of the 15 Most Powerful Women at Google by Business Insider. In July 2019 she was named #9 on Fast Company's 100 Most Creative People in Business. Ivy is the co-author of the New York Times bestselling book Your Brain on Art: How the Arts Transform Us with Susan Huganir Magsamen. This book shares the science behind humanities birthright - to make and behold art and its power to amplify physical and mental health, learning and build stronger communities.

== Background and education ==
Ross was born in Yonkers, New York, and grew up in Riverdale. She credits her father, an industrial engineer who worked for the Raymond Loewy studio that created the Studebaker Hawk automobile, for influencing her choice of careers. Ross attended the High School of Art and Design in New York City, with a major in fine art and minor in psychology. She later attended the Syracuse University School of Design and the Fashion Institute of Technology in New York City with a major in jewelry design. She went on to complete the Professional Management Development Program at Harvard Business School in 1994. In 2016, she gave the keynote speech at the Fashion Institute of Technology and was presented with an honorary Doctor of Humane Letters degree.

== Career ==
Ross began her professional career as a designer. After college she launched a jewelry design business in 1978 called Small Wonders. Until the mid-‘80s, Ross worked as a designer for Avon Products Inc. She oversaw product development for Swatch Watch and worked as an accessories designer for Liz Claiborne before moving on to direct design and product development for Outlook Eyewear (Bausch and Lomb), Coach, and Calvin Klein.

During Ross's tenure at Mattel (1998 to 2004) as senior vice president of worldwide product design & brand image for The Girls Division, she was charged with developing a new toy for the pre-teen girls segment. Ross conceived of an experiment in multi-disciplinary design dubbed “Project Platypus”, which resulted in Mattel's highly successful Ello Creation System.

Whilst at Mattel, Ross also failed to see the shift in consumer preferences of the "tween" segment: i.e. girls between the age of 9 to 12 years old. This caused a U.S. toy company named MGA Entertainment Inc. to launch a competitive series of dolls named Bratz. After the introduction of Bratz in 2001, sales of Barbie declined rapidly, whereby Bratz outsold Barbie for the first time in December 2003. From that moment, Bratz became had number one marketshare position. As a consequence of the significant drop in sales of Barbie, Mattel had to take drastic measures to be able to further lose marketshare. Ross left Mattel just after Barbie lost its number one market position.

After leaving Mattel, Ross joined the Gap Inc. as executive VP of product design & development for Old Navy from 2004 to 2007. While there, Ross created an in-house blog called "Culture Feed" with insight culled from the Internet and curated by trend-hunter Jody Turner. She left to become Senior VP and chief creative officer for the Disney Stores of America (owned by the Children's Place), a position she held for one year before returning to the Gap Inc. in 2008. As executive vice president of marketing for the Gap Inc. Ross was responsible for the launch of the 1969 denim line of jeans. In July 2011, Ross joined Art.com where she served as chief marketing officer until her move to Google X in 2014.

At Salone Internazionale del Mobile di Milano in April 2019, Ross led the Google Hardware Design Studio in building A Space for Being: a 6000 square foot installation based on the concepts of neuroaesthetics. The exhibit was created in partnership with Reddymade Architecture, Susan Magsamen and the International Arts + Mind Lab at Johns Hopkins University, and Muuto Furniture Design.

== Jewelry ==
Ross was one of the first jewelers to use titanium, tantalum, and niobium, metals that reveal a spectrum of colors when they are charged with electricity. By age 26, Ross had some of her jewelry designs included in the permanent collections of 10 museums, including the Smithsonian, the Victoria and Albert Museum in London, the Museum of Arts and Design, the Schmuckmuseum, in Pforzheim, Germany, the Cooper-Hewitt, National Design Museum in New York City and the Montreal Visual Arts Center. Ross is a recognized American craft artist and has had her work exhibited globally. In 1984 Ross and then-husband Robert Ebendorf won a Formica design competition through the exploration of a new product called ColorCore™.

== Boards ==
Ross is on the board of directors for Destination XL Group Inc, Willow, ArtCenter College of Design, and the Cooper Hewitt Smithsonian Design Museum. Previously, she was on the design board for Procter & Gamble and the Institute for Play.

== Honors and awards ==
Ross was given the Juror, Industrial Design Excellence Awards (IDEA) competition in 2006. Additionally, she presented as a business storyteller for BIF-2, a collaborative innovation summit sponsored by the Business Innovation Factory, that same year. In 2003, Ross was one of nine executives chosen by Fast Company magazine for the “Who's Fast 2003” issue. In 2008, she was named a Fashion Design Mentor for Otis College of Art & Design. In 2017, Ross was featured as one of 200 Women who will change the way you see the world in both a book and a touring exhibition. Surface magazine featured Ross in The Boundaries Issue on barrier-breaking figures in 2019.

== Podcast appearances ==
Ross has been featured as a guest on several podcasts, including Meet the Creatives, Time Sensitive, Clever, The Vergecast, and Design Milk.
