= Sandra Magsamen =

American writer (born 1959)

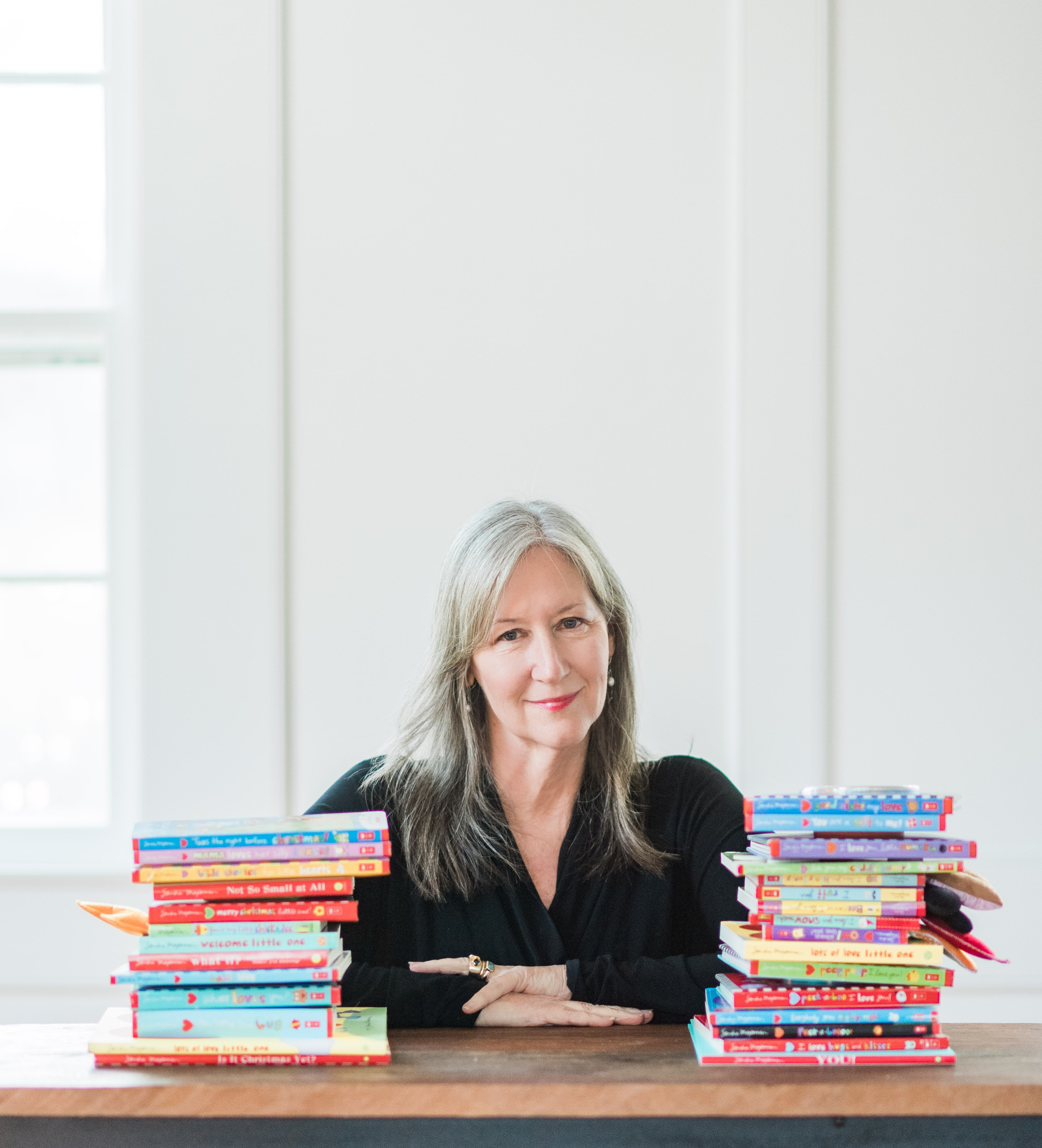
- Born: August 22, 1959 (age 67); Baltimore, Maryland, U.S.
- Education: Swain School of Design (BA); Goucher College (MA)
- Occupations: Author, illustrator, designer
- Writing career
- Years active: 1988-present
- Genre: Children’s picture books

Sandra Magsamen is an American author, artist, art therapist, and designer. She has published over 60 children's books with publishers Scholastic, Sourcebooks and Little Brown and has worked with national department stores, mid-tier, specialty and mass market through her national lifestyle brands From the Studio of Sandra Magsamen, Messages from the Heart, Wishes & Kisses and Treasured to design custom collections. Magsamen has proudly partnered with retailers such as Walmart, JCPenney, Hallmark, Studio-e-fabrics, Bamboozle Homewares and 1-800-Flowers.

== Background ==
Sandra Lee Magsamen was born in Baltimore, Maryland. Magsamen's maternal great-grandfather and great-uncle, William Fuld and Isaac Fuld, were early 1900s inventors who devised the Ouija board. Sandra has four sisters, one of whom is her twin, the scholar and author, Susan Huganir Magsamen. She received a Bachelor of Fine Arts degree from the Swain School of Design in New Bedford, Massachusetts in 1981 and a Master's in Art Therapy from Goucher College in 1984. Magsamen first became interested in the arts and the interaction of art, creativity, health and well-being in as a child when she was severely injured in a farming accident and spent a year in home and hospital school where she spent her days painting and drawing. Magsamen is married to painter Mark Barry. Together, they have one daughter, Hannah.

== Publishing ==
Magsamen is a best-selling and award-winning author of over 60 adult and children's books and has sold over 5 million copies to date. Her children's books consistently rank as best-sellers at Barnes & Noble, Target, Amazon and Walmart and are additionally sold nationally at wholesale clubs, specialty markets, independent booksellers and online retailers. Magsamen's work with publishers Scholastic and Sourcebooks have made her well known. Notable titles include: “Welcome Little One”, “You!” and “I Love You Honey Bunny”.

== Career ==
In 1987, Magsamen began creating her own art in her kitchen to commemorate the varied experiences and inspirations embedded in everyday life. She created a collection of pottery for her newborn daughter as a gift of life lessons. This gift became the essence of her life work.

In response to a growing demand for her handmade originals, Magsamen founded Table Tiles, Inc., her handmade gift company in 1991, which, in less than a decade, expanded into a multi-million dollar gift business.

In 1997, she began licensing her work. Since then, she has designed successful collections for national department stores, mid-tier, specialty and mass market through her national lifestyle brands From the Studio of Sandra Magsamen, Messages from the Heart, Wishes & Kisses and Treasured.

In 2003, Magsamen's book “The Gift” (published by Glitterati Books) was selected as the inspiration for Saks 5th Avenue's annual Christmas window display. In partnership with Save The Music. The display shared the story of “The Gift” with the help of A-list musicians like Beyonce, Sheryl Crow, Darius Rucker, B.B. King, Gloria Estefan, Ashanti and Jewel.

Beginning in 2013, Magsamen began a partnership with online retailer 1-800-Flowers to design exclusive collections for their customers. Magsamen has said of the collaboration, "1-800-Flowers wants to help connect people and so do I, so our partnership is one of deep understanding and shared commitment.".

In 2015, Magsamen began a partnership with Studio E Fabrics and, through this partnership, has created over 30 “sew your own” fabric book kits. Also in 2015, Magsamen began working with Bamboozle Homewares to create a line of sustainable dinnerware for children made from 100% recycled bamboo fibers.

In 2017, Magsamen partnered with Chick-fil-a to design a signature collection of children's board books for the Chick-fil-a Kid's Meal program.

== In the media ==
Magsamen has been featured on The Big Idea with Donny Deutsch, In Style Magazine, O Magazine, Women's Wear Daily, In Touch, Us Weekly, The Baltimore Sun Publishers Weekly, WYPR's Midday with Tom Hall, The Children's Book Review and Life & Style.

She is a featured columnist on Oprah.com with 200+ articles.

Magsamen's signature lifestyle book, Living Artfully, which was accompanied by the television special, "Living Artfully with Sandra Magsamen," premiered on PBS stations nationwide in December 2006.(PBS) published by Free Press.

In 2007, Magsamen designed the decorations and guest gift baskets for the baby shower of Tori Spelling and Dean McDermott using her “Messages From the Heart” baby collection with JCPenney.

Magsamen appeared on a 2014 episode of the OWN Show (the Oprah Winfrey YouTube Channel) to share creative gifting ideas.
