= Daniel Berlyne =

British/Canadian psychologist (1924–1976)

Daniel Ellis Berlyne
- Born: April 25, 1924; Salford, Greater Manchester, England
- Died: 1976; Toronto, Ontario, Canada
- Education: Trinity College, Cambridge (BA, MA); Yale University (Ph.D)
- Scientific career
- Fields: Psychology
- Workplaces: University of St. Andrew's, University of Aberdeen, Boston University, University of Toronto
- Thesis: Some Aspects of Human Curiosity (1953)
- Doctoral advisor: Carl I. Hovland

Daniel Ellis Berlyne (April 25, 1924 – November 2, 1976) was a British and Canadian psychologist. Berlyne worked at several universities both in Canada and the United States. His work was in the field of experimental and exploratory psychology. Specifically, his research focused on how objects and experiences are influenced by and have an influence on curiosity and arousal.

== Biography ==
Berlyne was born in Salford, Greater Manchester, England on April 25, 1924. There he attended Manchester Grammar School and Trinity College, Cambridge. From there he received his bachelor's degree in 1947 and master's degree in 1949. From there he went to Yale University where, while teaching full-time at Brooklyn College in New York City, he earned his PhD in 1951. In 1953 Berlyne was forced to leave the United States because of problems with his visa. He worked in Scotland as a professor until his return to the United States in 1957.

=== Awards and recognition ===
Berlyne held fellowships at the Royal Society of Canada, the British Psychological Society, and at several other American and Canadian psychological associations. He also served as president of the Canadian Psychological Association from 1971 to 1972 and of the General Psychology and Psychology and Arts departments of the American Psychological Associations from 1973 to 1974. That year, 1974, he was co-president of the XVIIIth International Congress of Applied Psychology in Montreal, vice president of the Canadian and American departments of the Interamerican Society of Psychology, and as president of the International Association of Empirical Aesthetics.

== Work ==
=== Academic and teaching ===
Berlynes first academic teaching position was at St. Andrew's University in Scotland while he was still a student at Cambridge. He then worked at Brooklyn College while pursuing his PhD at Yale University. During his return to Great Britain, Berlyne worked at the University of Aberdeen for four years, from 1953 until 1957. He was also a resident member at the Centre International d'Epistemologie Genetique in Geneva, Switzerland from 1958 to 1959, and a visiting scientist and the National Institute of Mental Health in Maryland from 1959 until 1960. He worked as an associate professor at Boston University until 1962, when he was hired as a professor of psychology at the University of Toronto, where he remained until his death in 1976.

=== Writing ===
Berlyne has published seven books, including: Conflict, Arousal and Curiosity (1960), Humor and its Kin (1972), Invited Commentary: B.F. Skinner's Beyond Freedom and Dignity (1972), and Behaviorism? Cognitive Theory? Humanistic Psychology?— To Hull with Them All (1974). He has also authored hundreds of articles and chapters such as 'Interest' as a Psychological Concept in 1949, an article which he claims to have introduced the concept of curiosity into psychological literature.

=== Research ===
Berlyne is often considered the heir to C.L. Hull's Hullian School of behavior. Thus, most of Berlyne's work focused on the effects of and reactions to curiosity and arousal, rather than focus on the ideas as states of being. His work focused on "why organisms display curiosity and explore their environment, why they seek knowledge and information". He believed that objects impact on three levels, psychophysical, environmental, and collative. The last of these was a term coined by Berlyne which attempted to describe the hedonic levels of arousal fluctuation through stimuli such as novelty, complexity, surprisingness, incongruity. Ultimately, he believed that arousal was best and most effective when at a moderate level and influenced by the complexity and novelty of the arousing object.
