= Semir Zeki =

British neurobiologist (born 1940)

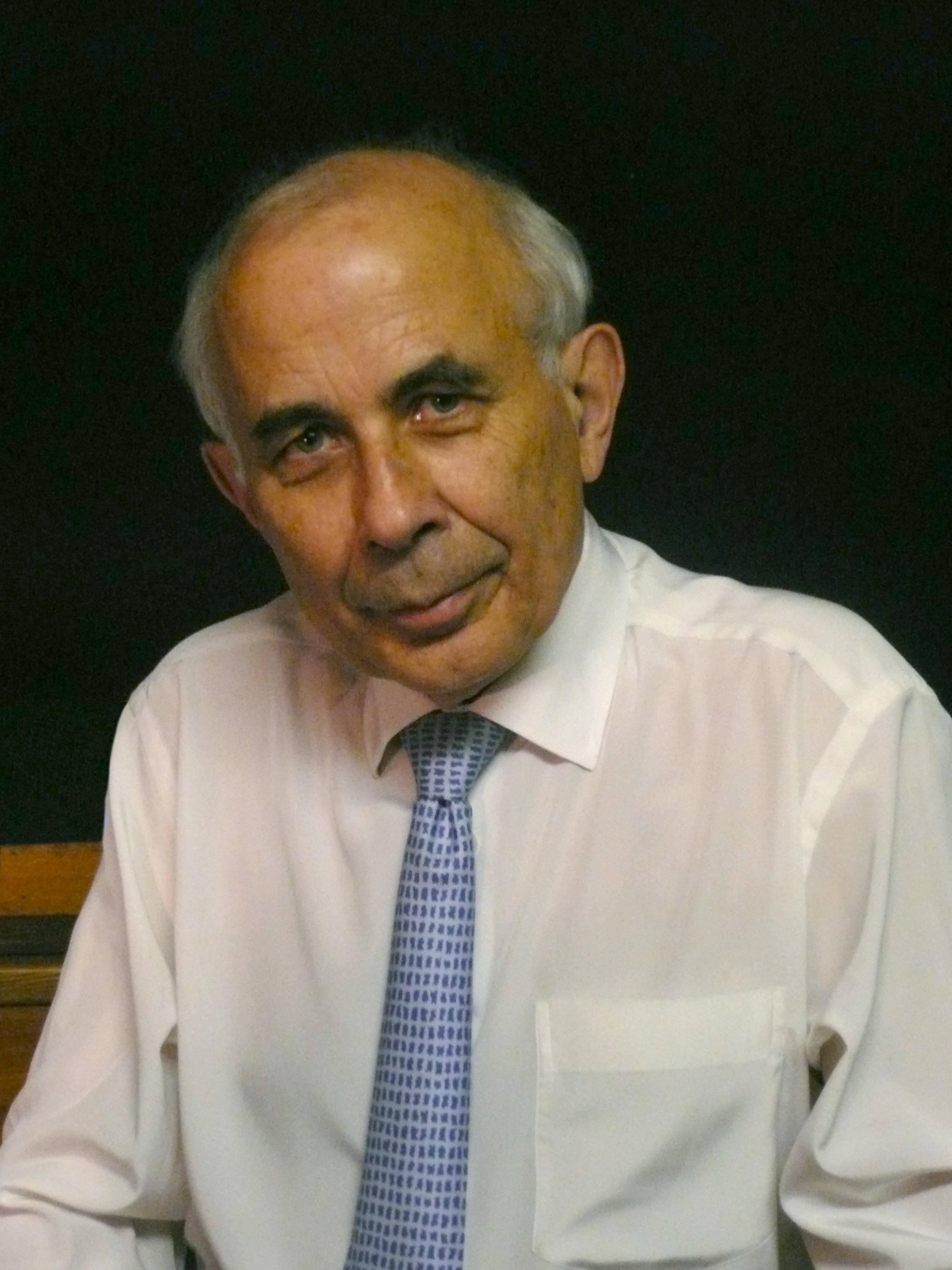
Semir Zeki (2016)

Semir Zeki (born 8 November 1940) is a British and French neurobiologist who has specialised in studying the primate visual brain and more recently the neural correlates of affective states, such as the experience of love, desire and beauty that are generated by sensory inputs within the field of neuroesthetics. He was educated at University College London (UCL) where he was Henry Head Research Fellow of the Royal Society before being appointed Professor of Neurobiology. Since 2008 he has been Professor of Neuroesthetics at UCL.

== Early work ==
Zeki's early work was mainly anatomical in nature and consisted in charting visual areas in the primate (monkey) brain by studying their connections, leading him to define several visual areas lying anterior to the primary visual cortex (area V1) of the brain. This was followed by recording from single cells in these areas, which led him to the view (a) that there is a functional specialisation in the visual cortex, with different visual areas undertaking different visual tasks, such as the processing of colour, motion and form and (b) that the visual brain processes these different attributes in parallel.

== Time at University College London ==
He later showed, using brain imaging techniques, that the same principles apply to the organisation of the human visual brain. In recent work he has shown that parallel processing appears to extend beyond the mere processing of visual signals to their grouping in parietal cortex. His work on colour vision was influenced by the work and methods of Edwin H. Land, whose techniques he employed in his physiological and brain imaging experiments, and which led him to the view that colour is constructed by the brain and that a specialised visual area, area V4, is critical to this process.

These findings raised the question of how the signals processed in these separate visual areas are integrated to give a unified picture of the visual world. In psychophysical experiments undertaken with colleagues, he showed that we perceive, and become aware of, different visual attributes at different times, with colour preceding motion by about 80 ms and form (orientation) by about 40 ms, leading to the view that there is a temporal asynchrony in vision which is the result of different processing speeds for different attributes. This in turn led him to suggest that visual consciousness is not unified; rather there are many visual micro-consciousness which are distributed in time and space, and that activity in each visual area can acquire a conscious correlate without the necessity of reporting to another cortical area, though acknowledging that there must be other enabling systems, possibly located in the reticular formation. Thus, functional specialisation manifests itself in the temporal sequence with which we see different attributes such as colour

More recently he has also studied the brain reaction to affective states generated by sensory inputs, such as the experience of love and hate. His studies of the experience of visual and musical beauty has led him to suggest that a specific part of the emotional brain, field A1 of the medial orbito-frontal cortex, is critical for such experiences.

== Public engagement ==
He has lectured widely across the world, giving over 60 named lectures, including the Ferrier Lecture (Royal Society 1995); The Philip Bard Lecture (Johns Hopkins University, 1992); The Woodhull Lecture (Royal Institution, London, 1995); The Humphry Davy Lecture (Académie des Sciences, Paris, 1996); The Grass Foundation Forbes Lectures (Marine Biological Laboratory, Woods Hole, USA 1997; Carl Gustave Bernhard Lecture (Royal Swedish Academy of Science, Stockholm, 1996; and the Tizard Lecture (Westminster School, London, 2004) among others.

He has published three books, A Vision of the Brain (Blackwell, Oxford 1993 – translated into Japanese and Spanish), Inner Vision: an exploration of art and the brain (OUP, 1999); Splendors and Miseries of the Brain (Wiley-Blackwell, Oxford 2009) and co-authored La Quête de l'essentiel, Les Belles Lettres, Archimbaud, Paris, 1995 (with Balthus, Count Klossowski de Rola) and La bella e la bestia, 2011, Laterza, Italy (with Ludovica Lumer).

He held an exhibition of his own art work at the Pecci Museum of Contemporary Art in Milan in 2011 (Bianco su bianco: oltre Malevich).

== Posts, honours and awards ==
He was Editor of the Philosophical Transactions of the Royal Society (B) from 1997 to 2004.

He has been a Trustee of Fight for Sight, a Guarantor of the neurological journal Brain, a member and then Chairman of the Wellcome Trust Vision Panel and a member of the National Science Council of France (1998–2002).

He has been a Visiting Fellow or Professor at the University of St Andrews; LMU Munich; Duke University, USA, University of California, Berkeley, among other institutions. He has conducted a number of public dialogues with writers, artists and art historians, including Dame Antonia Byatt, Balthus, Hans Belting, Peter Sellars, Michelangelo Pistoletto and Tetsuo Miyajima.

He is a Fellow of the Royal Society (1990), Member of the Academia Europaea (1991), Member of the European Academy of Sciences and Arts (Salzburg) (1993), Foreign Member of the American Philosophical Society (1998), Founding Fellow of the Academy of Medical Sciences (1998), Fellow of University College London (2000), Honorary Member of the Physiological Society (2013), and International Honorary Member, American Academy of Arts and Sciences (2024).

D.Sc. (honoris causa) from Aston University, University of Aberdeen, Aristotle University of Thessaloniki and an MD (honoris causa) from the National and Kapodistrian University of Athens.

Prizes include The Golden Brain Award (1985), Prix Science pour l'art (1991), Rank Prize in Opto-Electronics (1992) (jointly with A. Movshon and T. Adelson), Zotterman Prize (1993); Koetser Foundation Prize (1997), Award in Electronic Imaging (2002); King Faisal International Prize in Biology (2004), Erasmus Medal (Academia Europaea, 2008), Aristotle Gold Medal (2011), Rome Prize (Atena Onlus) (2012) and the BMI-Kaloy Prize (Kaloy Foundation) 2015. He received the 38th TS Srinivasan Endowment Oration Award 2018, during the TS Srinivasa NIMHANS Conclave. The conclave coincides with the 11th International Congress of the International Neuropsychiatric Association.

== Scientific achievements ==
Zeki's scientific achievements include:

- Discovery of the many visual areas of the brain and their functional specialisation for different visual attributes such as colour, motion and form.
- Finding neurons in a part of the monkey visual system that would respond only when a particular colour, rather than a particular wavelength, was in their receptive fields. For example, he showed that a red-sensitive neuron would continue to respond to a red stimulus, even when it was illuminated mainly by green light. This was the first study relating colour perception to single cell physiology in the brain.
- Showing that processing sites in the visual brain are also perceptual sites.
- Showing that we see different attributes of visual input at different times.
- Charting the activity of the brain in time and showing that different visual areas have different activity time courses.
- Studying the neural correlates of subjective mental states, such as love and beauty, and more recently, hate.
