= Neuroesthetics =

Neuroscientific approaches purposed under the scope of applied aesthetics

Researchers are looking to neuroscience for answers behind why the human brain finds artistic works like DaVinci's Mona Lisa so alluring.

Neuroaesthetics (or neuroaesthetics) is a sub-discipline of applied aesthetics. Empirical aesthetics takes a scientific approach to the study of aesthetic experience of art, music, or any object that can give rise to aesthetic judgments. Neuroesthetics is a term coined by Semir Zeki in 1999 and received its formal definition in 2002 as the scientific study of the neural bases for the contemplation and creation of a work of art. Anthropologists and evolutionary biologists alike have accumulated evidence suggesting that human interest in, and creation of, art evolved as an evolutionarily necessary mechanism for survival across cultures and throughout history. Neuroesthetics uses neuroscience to explain and understand the aesthetic experiences at the neurological level. The topic attracts scholars from many disciplines including neuroscientists, art historians, artists, art therapists and psychologists.

== Overview ==
Neuroaesthetics is a field of experimental science that aims to combine Neuroscience (Neuro-Psychology) research with aesthetics by investigating the "perception, production, and response to art, as well as interactions with objects and scenes that evoke an intense feeling, often of pleasure." The recently developed field seeks, among other things, the neural correlates of aesthetic judgment and creativity, and how these help humans communicate and connect. It is argued that visual aesthetics, namely the capacity of assigning different degrees of beauty to certain forms, colors, or movements, is a human trait acquired after the divergence of human and other ape lineages, rendering the experience of beauty a defining characteristic of humankind.

One core question for the field is whether art or aesthetic preferences are guided by a set of scientific laws or principles. Additionally, the evolutionary rationale for the formation and characteristics of these principles are sought. It is believed that identification of the brain circuitry involved in aesthetic judgments (e.g., by using through the use of brain imaging) can help pinpoint the origin of these responses. Many scholars, including neuroscientists, remain skeptical of the reductive approach adopted by neuroaesthetics.

The subfield of Computational Neuroaesthetics has aimed to utilize machine learning algorithms in conjunction with neuroimaging data to predict what humans would find most aesthetically pleasing. This field was pioneered by Fechner and Birkhoff in 1933; however it was years later that technology caught up enough to test, and prove, their hypotheses that aesthetics could be measured in a mathematical way. Real world applications of these models include recommending products via online advertisement. However, modeling serves the broader purpose of building scientific understanding and understanding the mechanisms guiding decision making and other cognitive processes by simulating the involved neural architecture.

== Approaches of study ==
Researchers who have been prominent in the field combine principles from perceptual psychology, evolutionary biology, neurological deficits, and functional brain anatomy in order to address the evolutionary meaning of beauty that may be the essence of art. Involvement from both the rewards center of the brain and the Default Mode Network, once believed to only play a part in daydreaming, have been implicated in why humans derive pleasure from viewing and creating art. It is felt that neuroscience is a very promising path for the search for the quantified evaluation of art. With the aim of discovering general rules about aesthetics, one approach is the observation of subjects viewing art and the exploration of the mechanics of vision. It is proposed that pleasing sensations are derived from the repeated activation of neurons due to primitive visual stimuli such as horizontal and vertical lines. In addition to the generation of theories to explain this, such as Ramachandran's set of laws, it is important to use neuroscience to determine and understand the neurological mechanisms involved.

Neuroaesthetics approaches can be either descriptive or experimental. Descriptive neuroaesthetics refers to the practice of mapping properties of the brain onto aesthetic experiences. For example, if color is important to the experience of Fauvist art, then it is likely that areas of the brain that process color will be engaged when looking at such art. The claims of descriptive neuroaesthetics are regarded as hypothesis-generating and are typically qualitative in nature. Experimental neuroaesthetics, like any experimental science, produces data that are quantitative and vetted statistically. Experimental neuroaesthetics tests hypotheses, predicts results, and invites replication or falsification. The typical experimental methods used are those of cognitive neuroscience: fMRI, ERP, TMS, TDCS, and neuropsychology. Critics of neuroaesthetics typically target descriptive and not experimental neuroaesthetics.

The link between specific brain areas and artistic activity is of great importance to the field of neuroesthetics. This can be applied both to the ability to create and interpret art. A common approach to uncover the neural mechanisms is through the study of individuals, specifically artists, with neural disorders such as savant syndrome or some form of traumatic injury. The analysis of art created by these patients provides valuable insights to the brain areas responsible for capturing the essence of art.

The aesthetic enjoyment of individuals can be investigated using brain imaging experiments. When subjects are confronted with images of a particular level of aesthetics, the specific brain areas that are activated can be identified. It is argued that the sense of beauty and aesthetic judgment presupposes a change in the activation of the brain's reward system.

In 2004, Helmut Leder has developed a broad research program on the psychology of aesthetics and the arts. This program was introduced as a cognitive model of the appreciation of art in a paper published in the British Journal of Psychology. This model has served to frame many studies on the cognitive foundations of art, neuroaesthetics, product design, and web design, among other fields.

A crucial aspect of research lies in whether aesthetic judgment can be thought of as a bottom-up process driven by neural primitives or as a top-down process with high level cognition. Neurologists have had success researching primitives. However, there is a need to define higher level abstract philosophical concepts objectively with neural correlates. A phenomenon called embodied cognition allows art viewers to mentally place themselves inside the artwork, and feel not only as if they were there but feel how the creator of the art may have felt [1a]. Embodied cognition is a theory that suggests sensory experiences, motor actions, and the environment play significant roles in shaping how we think, reason, and understand the world; our material world is just that, not a projection created by the mind. It is suggested that aesthetic experience is a function of the interaction between top-down, intentional orientation of attention and the bottom-up perceptual facilitation of image construction. In other words, because untrained persons automatically apply the object-identification habit to viewing artworks, top-down control to reduce this habit may be necessary to engage aesthetic perception. This suggests that artists would show different levels of activation than non-artists.

Aesthetic responses to different types of art and techniques has recently been explored. Cubism is the most radical departure from Western forms of art, with the proposed purpose of forcing the viewer to discover less unstable elements of the object to be represented. It eliminates interferences such as lighting and perspective angle to capture objects as they really are. This may be compared to how the brain maintains an object's identity despite varying conditions. Modern, representational, and impressionistic art has also been studied for the purpose of explaining visual processing systems. Yet aesthetic judgments exists in all domains, not just art.

== Subcategories ==
=== Neuroarchitecture ===
Sitting at the intersection of neuroscience, cognitive psychology, and spatial design, Neuroarchitecture was pioneered by the Academy of Neuroscience for Architecture (ANFA) starting in 2003. Neuroarchitecture follows the theory that architectural design influences occupants physiologically and psychologically, arguably playing a role in human cognition, emotions, spatial navigation, and overall well-being. The built environment encompasses an array of possible stimuli that our brain, and subsequently our bodies, engage in a cyclic relationship with. Such stimuli can include visual, auditory, tactile, and olfactory perceptions. Depending on the perceived environmental stimulus, individual responses can vary in intensity and in whether they have positive or negative effects. A study done by Trujillo and colleagues measured stress levels of participants in 20 different waiting rooms showed that the architecture of a waiting room could impact individuals stress response to be either lower or higher. Research such as this can serve the argument that compositions of aesthetics such as architecture have a direct link to our neurophysiology. Evidence for this has been shown in testing different mechanisms in response to different environment, Joel Martínez-Soto and colleagues showed that exposure to restorative environments, such as structures with natural component led to activation of the middle frontal gyrus, middle and inferior temporal gyrus, insula, inferior parietal lobe, and cuneus linking these reactions to increased relaxation. Moreover, a study measuring stress response showed that the waiting room with a window versus without a window triggered less of a stress response, measured by physiological reactions of this stress state consisted of both heightened and prolonged spikes in salivary cortisol. it's unknown what exact components of architecture create more calm or stress responses in participants, or via which mechanisms they may be interacting with the nervous system to either elicit calm or stress responses, however this research serves to show how aspects we already widely accept to be restorative and calming, such as windows, natural light or vegetation can impact us on a neurophysiological level. Research on how this varies from individual to individual along with personal style is where future research is headed in this field.

== Frameworks ==
=== Aesthetic triad ===
Aesthetic experiences are an emergent property of interactions among a triad of neural systems that involve sensory-motor, emotion-valuation, and meaning-knowledge circuitry. Understanding that much of the research done on neuroaesthetics utilizes the aesthetic triad. The aesthetic triad are the components of the neural system utilized in an aesthetic experience and in research method, these components include sensory-motor, knowledge meaning and emotional valuation. The sensory- motor aspect is our automatic response to the recognition of objects and our engagement with said objects through our natural embodied reactions, while knowledge meaning establishes the understanding that our experience depends on the context and content present within the experience as shown in studies on neuroaesthetics, lastly the emotional valuation of these experiences is the component of our emotional response of either anger, fear, elation, or awe in these settings. Exploring the different subtopics of neuroaesthetics and the research being done aligns with this aesthetic triad.

The visual brain segregates visual elements like luminance, color, and motion, as well as higher order objects like faces, bodies, and landscapes. Aesthetic encounters engage these sensory systems. For example, gazing at Van Gogh's dynamic paintings evokes a subjective sense of movement and activates visual motion areas V5/MT+. Portraits activate the face area in the fusiform gyrus (FFA) and landscape paintings activate the place area in the parahippocampal gyrus (PPA). Beyond classifying visual elements, these sensory areas may also be involved in evaluating them. Beautiful faces activate the fusiform face and adjacent areas. The question of how much and what kind of valuation takes place in sensory cortices is an area of active inquiry.

Looking at paintings that depict actions also engages parts of people's motor systems. This engagement taps into the extended mirror neuron system. Mirror neurons, first discovered in monkeys, are neurons that respond to both the execution and perception of actions. A similar system exists in humans. This system resonates when people infer the intent of artistic gestures or observe the consequences of actions such as in Lucio Fontana's cut canvases. This subtle motor engagement may represent an embodied element of our empathetic responses to visual art.

The pleasure that people derive from looking at beautiful objects automatically engages general reward circuitry. For example, attractive faces activate the FFA and parts of the ventral striatum even when people are not thinking explicitly about the attractiveness of these faces. The orbito- and medial-frontal cortex, the ventral striatum, anterior cingulate and insula respond to beautiful visual images and the medial orbitofrontal cortex and adjacent cingulate cortex respond to different sources of pleasures including music and even architectural spaces.

Kirk and colleagues investigated the effects of expectations on neural responses. People rated abstract "art-like" images as more attractive if labeled as being from a museum than labeled as generated by a computer. This preference was accompanied by greater neural activity in the medial orbitofrontal and ventromedial prefrontal cortex. Thinking an image was a museum piece also produced activity in the entorhinal cortex, suggesting that people's expectations draw on memories that enhance (or probably also diminish) visual pleasure. Similarly, Lacey and colleagues found that people's ventral striatum and parts of the orbitofrontal cortex were more responsive to the "art status" than to the actual content of visual images. Huang and colleagues found that people have different neural responses when told that they are looking at an authentic or copied Rembrandt portrait. Authentic portraits evoked orbitofrontal activity, whereas copies evoked neural responses in the frontopolar cortex and the right precuneus.

Alternatively, according to the Neo-Kantian approach, "aesthetic pleasure arises from the fitting of predictive representations to sensory experiences". When our predictive representations align well with our sensory experiences, it results in a sense of aesthetic pleasure. This alignment might involve things like finding coherence, harmony, or resonance between what we expected and what we actually perceive.The implication of these studies is that context and knowledge beyond the sensory qualities of visual images demonstrably affects people's neural activity in aesthetic experiences.

=== Semir Zeki's laws of the visual brain ===
Semir Zeki, professor of neuroesthetics at the University College of London, views art as an example of the variability of the brain. Thus a neurological approach to the source of this variability may explain particular subjective experiences as well as the ranges of abilities to create and experience art. Zeki theorizes that artists unconsciously use techniques to create visual art to study the brain. Zeki suggests that

"...the artist is in a sense, a neuroscientist, exploring the potentials and capacities of the brain, though with different tools. How such creations can arouse aesthetic experiences can only be fully understood in neural terms. Such an understanding is now well within our reach."

He proposes two supreme laws of the visual brain:

==== Constancy ====
Despite the changes that occur when processing visual stimuli (distance, viewing angle, illumination, etc.), the brain has the unique ability to retain knowledge of constant and essential properties of an object and discard irrelevant dynamic properties. This applies not only to the ability to, for example, always see a banana as the color yellow but also the recognition of faces at varying angles.

Comparatively, a work of art captures the essence of an object. The creation of art itself may be modeled off of this primitive neural function. The process of painting for example involves distilling an object down to represent it as it really is, which differs from the way the eyes see it. Zeki also tried to represent the Platonic Ideal and the Hegelian Concept through the statement: forms do not have an existence without a brain and the ability for stored memory, referring to how artists such as Monet could paint without knowing what the objects are in order to capture their true form.

==== Abstraction ====
This process refers to the hierarchical coordination where a general representation can be applied to many particulars, allowing the brain to efficiently process visual stimuli. The ability to abstract may have evolved as a necessity due to the limitations of memory. In a way, art externalizes the functions of abstraction in the brain. The process of abstraction is unknown to cognitive neurobiology. However, Zeki proposes an interesting question of whether there is a significant difference in the pattern of brain activity when viewing abstract art as opposed to representational art.

=== Ramachandran's eight laws of artistic experience ===
Vilayanur S. Ramachandran and his fellow researchers including William Hirstein, developed a highly speculative theory of human artistic experience and the neural mechanisms that mediate it. These "laws" combine to develop underlying high order concepts of the human artistic experience. Although not all encompassing as there are undoubtedly many other principles of artistic experience, the theorists claim that they provide a framework for understanding aspects of visual art, style and design. Although testing of these principles quantitatively may provide future evidence for specific areas of the brain responsible for one kind of aesthetic appeal, the theory faces substantial philosophical and historical objections.

==== Peak shift principle ====
This psychological phenomenon is typically known for its application in animal discrimination learning. In the peak shift effect, animals sometimes respond more strongly to exaggerated versions of the training stimuli. For instance, a rat is trained to discriminate a square from a rectangle by being rewarded for recognizing the rectangle. The rat will respond more frequently to the object for which it is being rewarded to the point that a rat will respond to a rectangle that is longer and more narrow with a higher frequency than the original with which it was trained. This is called a supernormal stimulus. The fact that the rat is responding more to a "super" rectangle implies that it is learning a rule.

This effect can be applied to human pattern recognition and aesthetic preference. Some artists attempt to capture the very essence of something in order to evoke a direct emotional response. In other words, they try to make a "super" rectangle to get the viewer to have an enhanced response. To capture the essence of something, an artist amplifies the differences of that object, or what makes it unique, to highlight the essential features and reduce redundant information. This process mimics what the visual areas of the brain have evolved to do and more powerfully activates the same neural mechanisms that were originally activated by the original object.

Some artists deliberately exaggerate creative components such as shading, highlights, and illumination to an extent that would never occur in a real image to produce a caricature. A significant portion of the experience of art is not self-consciously reflected upon by audiences, so it is not clear whether the peak-shift thesis has any special explanatory power in understanding the creation and reception of art.

==== Isolation ====
Isolating a single visual cue helps the organism allocate attention to the output of a single module, thereby allowing it to more effectively enjoy the peak shift along the dimensions represented in that module. In other words, there is a need to isolate the desired visual form before that aspect is amplified. This is why an outline drawing or sketch is sometimes more effective as art than an original color photograph. For example, a cartoonist may exaggerate certain facial features which are unique to the character and remove other forms which it shares such as skin tones. This efficiency prevents non-unique features from detracting from the image. This is why one can predict that an outline drawing would be more aesthetically pleasing than a color photograph.

The viewer's attention is drawn towards this single area allowing one's attention to be focused on this source of information. Enhancements introduced by the artist more carefully noted resulting in the amplification of limbic system activation and reinforcement.

==== Grouping ====
Perceptual grouping to delineate a figure from the background may be enjoyable. The source of the pleasure may have come about because of the evolutionary necessity to give organisms an incentive to uncover objects, such as predators, from noisy environments. For example, when viewing ink blots, the visual system segments the scene to defeat camouflage and link a subset of splotches together. This may be accomplished most effectively if limbic reinforcement is fed back to early vision at every stage of visual processing leading up to the discovery of the object. The key idea is that due to the limited attentional resources, constant feedback facilitates processing of features at earlier stages due to the discovery of a clue which produces limbic activation to draw one's attention to important features. Though not spontaneous, this reinforcement is the source of the pleasant sensation. The discovery of the object itself results in a pleasant 'aha' revelation causing the organism to hold onto the image.

An artist can make use of this phenomenon by teasing the system. This allows for temporary binding to be communicated by a signal to the limbic system for reinforcement which is a source of the aesthetic experience.

==== Contrast ====
Extracting contrast involves eliminating redundant information and focusing attention. Cells in the retina, the lateral geniculate body or relay station in the brain, and in the visual cortex respond predominantly to step changes in luminance rather than homogeneous surface colors. Smooth gradients are much harder for the visual system to detect rather than segmented divisions of shades resulting in easily detectable edges. Contrasts due to the formation of edges may be pleasing to the eye. The importance of the visual neuron's varying responses to the orientation and presence of edges has previously been proven by David H. Hubel and Torsten Wiesel. This may hold evolutionary significance since regions of contrast are information rich requiring reinforcement and the allocation of attention. In contrast to the principle of grouping, contrasting features are typically in close proximity eliminating the need to link distant, but similar features.

==== Perceptual problem solving ====
Tied to the detection of contrast and grouping is the concept that discovery of an object after a struggle is more pleasing than one which is instantaneously obvious. The mechanism ensures that the struggle is reinforcing so that the viewer continues to look until the discovery. From a survival point of view, this may be important for the continued search for predators. Ramachandran suggests for the same reason that a model whose hips and breasts are about to be revealed is more provocative than one who is already completely naked. A meaning that is implied is more alluring than one that is explicit.

==== Generic viewpoint ====
The visual system dislikes interpretations which rely on a unique vantage point. Rather it accepts the visual interpretation for which there is an infinite set of viewpoints that could produce the class of retinal images. For example, in a landscape image, it will interpret an object in the foreground as obscuring an object in the background, rather than assuming that the background figure has a piece missing.

In theory, if an artist is trying to please the eye, they should avoid such coincidences. However, in certain applications, the violation of this principle can also produce a pleasing effect.

==== Visual metaphors ====
Ramachandran defines a metaphor as a mental tunnel between two concepts that appear grossly dissimilar on the surface, but instead share a deeper connection. Similar to the effects of perceptual problem solving, grasping an analogy is rewarding. It enables the viewer to highlight crucial aspects that the two objects share. Although it is uncertain whether the reason for this mechanism is for effective communication or purely cognitive, the discovery of similarities between superficially dissimilar events leads to activation of the limbic system to create a rewarding process.

Support for this view is highlighted by the symptoms of Capgras delusion, where sufferers experience reduced facial recognition due to impairments in the connections from the inferotemporal cortex to the amygdala, which is responsible for emotions. The result is that a person no longer experiences the warm fuzzy feeling when presented with a familiar face. A person's "glow" is lost through what is suggested as due to the lack of limbic activation.

==== Symmetry ====
The aesthetic appeal of symmetry is easily understandable. Biologically it is important during the detection of a predator, location of prey, and the choosing of a mate as all of these tend to display symmetry in nature. It complements other principles relating to the discovering of information rich objects. Additionally, evolutionary biologists suggest that the predisposition towards symmetry is because biologically, asymmetry is associated with infection and disease, which can lead to poor mate selection. However, departures from symmetry in visual art are also widely considered beautiful, suggesting that while symmetry may explain the judgment that a particular individual's face is beautiful, it cannot explain the judgment that a work of art is beautiful.

== Areas of the brain linked to the processing of visual aesthetics ==
Aesthetic perception relies heavily on the processing by the visual centers in the brain such as the V1 cortex. Signals from V1 are distributed to various specialized areas of the brain. There is no single area where all specialized visual circuitry connect, reducing the chances of determining a single neural center responsible for aesthetics, rather a neural network is more likely. Therefore, the visual brain consists of several parallel multistage processing systems, each specialized in a given task such as color or motion. Functional specializations of the visual brain are already known.

Physiological phenomenon can explain several aspects of art appreciation. Different extrastriate areas of the visual cortex may have evolved to extract correlations of different visual features. The discovery and linking of various visual stimuli is facilitated and reinforced by direct connections from these areas to limbic structures. Additionally, art may be most appealing if it produces heightened activity in a single dimension rather than redundant activation of multiple modules, restricted by the allocation of attentional resources. In experimentation to determine specific areas, many researchers allow the viewer to decide the aesthetic appeal prior to the use of imaging techniques to account for the varying perceptions of beauty. When individuals contemplate the aesthetic appeal, different neural processes are engaged than when pragmatically viewing an image. However, processes of object identification and aesthetic judgment are involved simultaneously in the overall perception of aesthetics.

=== Prefrontal cortex ===
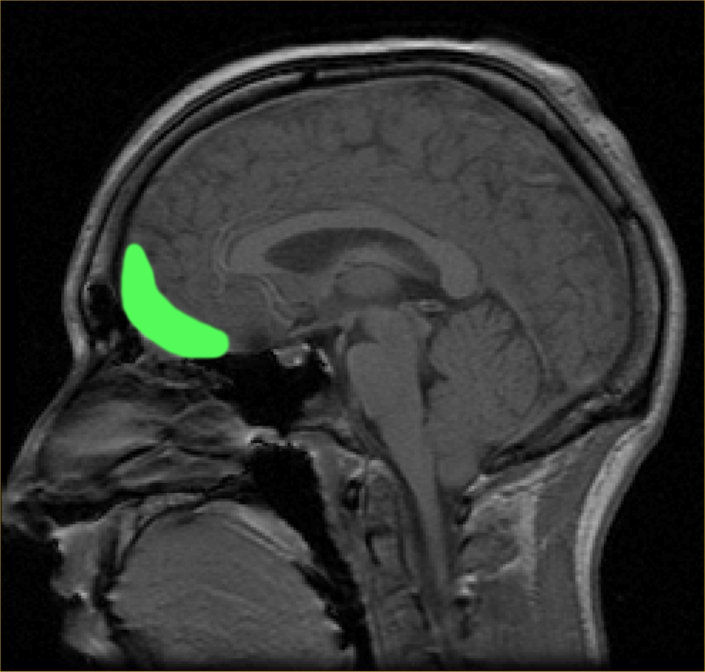
Location of the orbito-frontal cortex shown through MRI

The prefrontal cortex is previously known for its roles in the perception of colored objects, decision making, and memory. Recent studies have also linked it to the conscious aesthetic experience because it is activated during aesthetic tasks such as determining the appeal of a visual stimuli. This may be because a judgment is needed, requiring visiospatial memory. In a study performed by Zeki and Kawabata, it was found that the medial orbito-frontal cortex (mOFC) is involved in the judgment of whether a painting is beautiful or not. There is high activation in this region when a person views paintings which they consider beautiful. Other evidence shows that this same area is active during the experience of beauty derived from different sources, including musical beauty and moral beauty, and even mathematical beauty. Experience of the sublime, as opposed to the beautiful, results in a different pattern of brain activity; moreover, where it comes to judgment, although aesthetic and perceptual judgments leads t activity in the same brain areas, the pattern of activity is also different between the two, one of the most marked differences being the involvement of mOFC in aesthetic, but not in perceptual, judgments. Surprisingly, when a person views a painting which they consider ugly, no separate structures are activated. Therefore, it is proposed that changes in the intensity of activation in the orbito-frontal cortex correlate with the determination of beauty (higher activation) or ugliness (lower activation).

Conversely, activity in the motor cortex showed the opposite pattern. Additionally, the medial OFC has been found to respond aesthetics in terms of the context of which it is presented, such as text or other descriptions about the artwork. The current evidence linking the OFC to attributed hedonistic values across gustatory, olfactory, and visual modalities, suggests that the OFC is a common center for the assessment of a stimulus's value. The perception of aesthetics for these areas must be due to the activation of the brain's reward system with a certain intensity.

Prefrontal cortex is highlighted in orange. Location of Brodmann's areas indicated by numerical tabs.

Additionally, the prefrontal dorsalateral cortex (PDC) is selectively activated only by stimuli considered beautiful whereas prefrontal activity as a whole is activated during the judgment of both pleasing and unpleasing stimuli. The prefrontal cortex may be generally activated for directing the attention of the cognitive and perceptual mechanisms towards aesthetic perception in viewers untrained in visual arts. In other words, related directly to a person viewing art from an aesthetic perception due to the top-down control of their cognition. The lateral prefrontal cortex is shown to be linked to higher order self-referential procession and the evaluation of internally generated information. The left lateral PFC, Brodmann area 10, may be involved in maintaining attention on the execution of internally generated goals associated with approaching art from an aesthetic orientation.

Broca's Area, also in the Prefrontal cortex is impaired in many individuals with Post Traumatic Stress Disorder (PTSD). Dysfunction in this area leads to deficits in speech production; in this case the inability to verbally process a traumatic event(s). The process of making art allows those affected to "access pre-language areas of the brain" by creating their own symbolic imagery and connecting with others through this. Directing attention towards aesthetics may have evolutionary significance.

=== Additional areas ===
Emotions play a large role in aesthetic processing. Experiments designed specifically to force the subjects to view the artwork subjectively (by inquiring of its aesthetic appeal) rather than simply with the visual systems, revealed a higher activation in the brain's emotional circuitry. Results from these experiments revealed high activation in the bilateral insula which can be attributed to the emotional experience of viewing art. This correlates with other known emotional roles of the insula. However, the correlation between the insula's varying states of activation and positive or negative emotions in this context is unknown. The emotional view of art can be contrasted with perception related to object recognition when pragmatically viewing art. The right fusiform gyrus has been revealed to show activation to visual stimuli such as faces and representational art. The neuroaesthetics of facial recognition hold particular importance, as being drawn to faces likely increased sociability, allowing tribal environments to grow, resulting in greater protection and more availability of mates. This is likely involved in genetic fitness of offspring and child-rearing as well.

This holds importance in the field because as Ramachandran also speculated, object recognition and the search for meaning can evoke a pleasant emotional response. The motor cortex was also shown to be involved in aesthetic perception. However, it displayed opposite trends of activation from the OFC. It may be a common correlate for the perception of emotionally charged stimuli despite its previously known roles. Several other areas of the brain were shown to be slightly activated during certain studies such as the anterior cingulate cortex, previously known for its involvement in the feeling of romance, and the left parietal cortex, whose purpose may be to direct spatial attention.

Different artistic styles may also be processed differently by the brain. In a study between filtered forms of abstract and representation art, the bilateral occipital gyri, left cingulate sulcus, and bilateral fusiform gyrus showed increased activation with increased preference when viewing art. However, activation in the bilateral occipital gyri may be caused by the large processing requirements placed on the visual system when viewing high levels of visual detail in artwork such as representational paintings. Several areas of the brain have been shown to respond particularly to forms representational art perhaps due to the brain's ability to make object associations and other functions relating to attention and memory. This form of stimuli leads to increased activation in the left frontal lobe and bilaterally in the parietal and limbic lobes. Also, the left superior parietal lobule, Brodmann's area 7, has been shown to play a role in active image construction during the viewing of art specifically containing indeterminate forms such as soft edge paintings. Bottom up processes such as edge detection and the exploration of visual stimuli are engaged during this type of aesthetic perception. These roles are consistent with previously known parietal lobe responsibilities in spatial cognition and visual imagery.

== Criticism ==
There are several objections to researchers' attempts to reduce aesthetic experience to a set of physical or neurological laws. It is questionable whether the theories can capture the evocativeness or originality of individual works of art. Experiments performed may not account for these theories directly. Also, current experimentation measures a person's verbal response to how they feel about art which is often selectively filtered. Ramachandran suggests the use of galvanic skin response to quantify the judgment associated viewing aesthetics. Overall, it can be argued that there is lack of proportion between the narrow approach to art taken by researchers versus the grand claims they make for their theories.

Additional research carries the assumption that our emotions are engaged when viewing or interacting with something related to aesthetics such as architecture, fashion or art however, the argument has been made by Alexis Makin, a researcher on visual neuroscience, that we can not yet encapsulate the neuroscience and psychological experience that occurs when having an aesthetic experience. Thus insinuating that we can not attribute our experience of aesthetics to that of something on the neurophysiological level. In negation to this, Skov and his colleagues make the argument that he emotional response elicited and the perceptual cues engaged in aesthetic experiences is enough evidence to ascertain the existence of empirical aesthetics.The majority of studies on neuroaesthetics have measured neural responses to traditional and Western art styles. One journal suggested rerunning these experiments using "traditional Chinese painting, Tang poetry, Chinese courtyard landscapes". Limiting the scope of cultural stimuli creates bias in results because factors such as familiarity may affect participant responses.

== Future directions and related fields ==
Since 2005 the notion of bridging brain science and the visual arts has blossomed into a field of increasing international interest. In his 2008 book, Neuroarthistory: from Aristotle and Pliny to Baxandall and Zeki, Professor John Onians of the University of East Anglia considers himself to be at the forefront of the field of neural scientific biased art historical research, although such a "history" is much shorter than Onians would have us believe. Many historical figures he deals with as precursors for neuroarthistory (Karl Marx, for example) have very little to do with modern neuroscience as it is understood today. Contemporary artists like Mark Stephen Smith (William Campbell Gallery, US), Guillaume Bottazzi and others have developed extensive bodies of work mapping the convergence of brain science and painting. Smith's work explores fundamental visual analogies between neural function and self-expression in abstract art. The past decade has also seen a corresponding growth in the aesthetics of music studied from neuroscientific approaches. Psychological and social approaches to art help provide other theories of experience.

Art and music therapy are two proposed clinical applications for neuroaesthetics. Individuals with a variety of conditions including, but not limited to, Traumatic Brain Injury (TBI), and Neurodegenerative conditions such as Parkinsons, have shown symptom improvement after many types of art therapy and art exposure.

The advancements of biotechnology over time should allow neurophysiological responses to be recorded outside of the laboratory setting. Future directions should measure these responses while participants take part in immersive exhibits, especially those involving immersive multimedia exhibits such as TeamLab Planets TOKYO.

Interior design represents another applied direction for neuroaesthetics research. Environmental psychology research suggests that interior elements such as spatial scale, color, and the presence of natural light can produce measurable effects on mood, stress, and cognitive performance in occupants. A growing body of research examines how specific interior design choices, including material selection, spatial arrangement, and biophilic elements, relate to healing and wellbeing outcomes, particularly in healthcare environments.

== See also ==
- Aesthetic cognitivism
- Neuroaesthetics (Neidich)
- Processing fluency theory of aesthetic pleasure
