= Nöel Dolla =

French artist (born 1945)

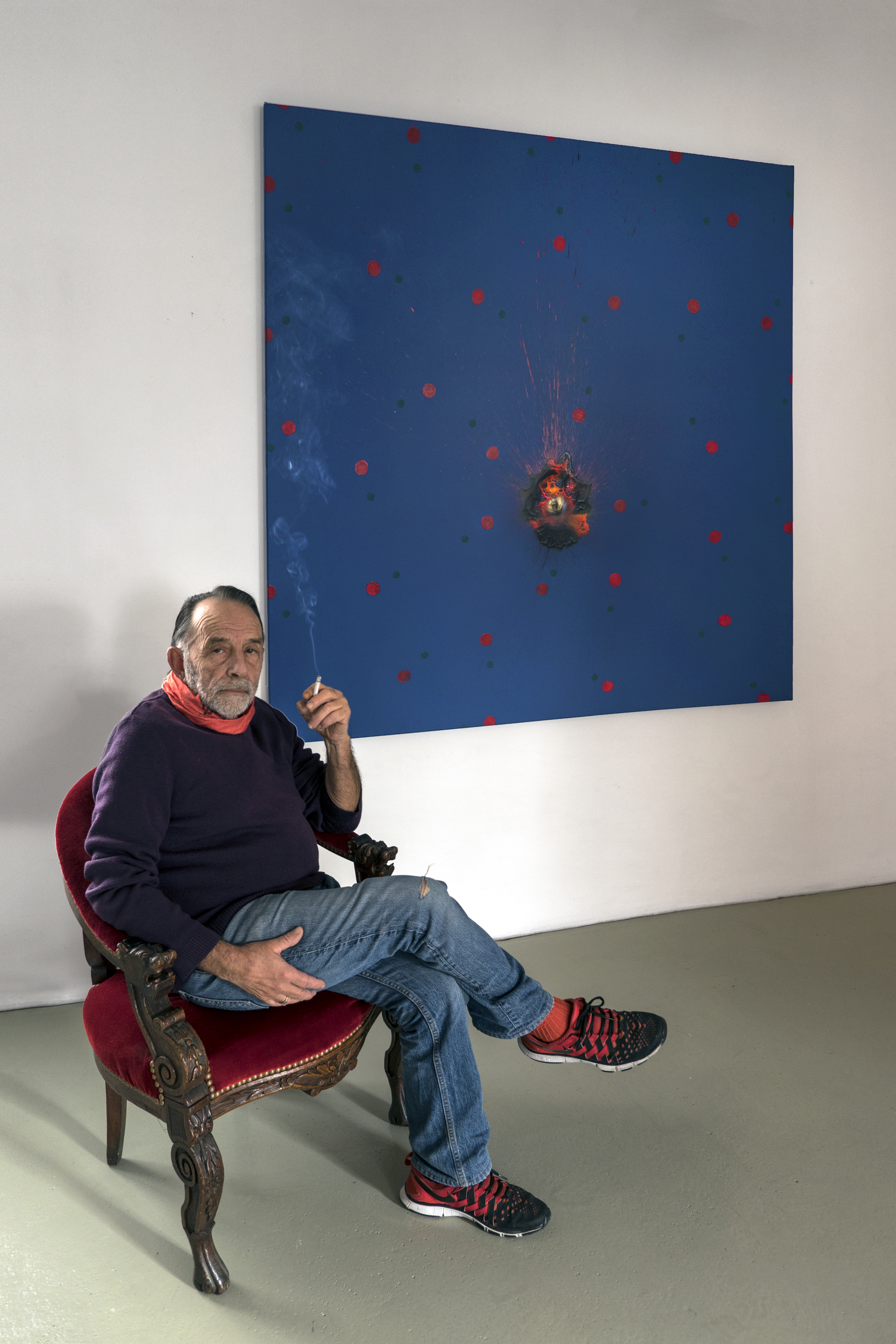
Noël Dola

Noël Dolla (born May 5, 1945) is a French Postwar painter. He was the youngest member of the Supports/Surfaces group, which emerged in the late 1960s in France. Since the late 1960s, the artist has had many exhibitions including international exhibitions. Some solo exhibitions include Ceysson Gallery in Geneva, Luxembourg, and Paris, Galerie des Multiples in Paris, Bourgoin-Jallieu Museum in France, MAMCO in Geneva, Contemporary Art Space Gustave Fayet in France, Museum Moderner Kunst Stiftung Ludwig in Vienna, Cultural Institute Italo-French in Bologna, among many others. He also exhibited work in 1971 at the Paris Biennale.

== Biography ==
Noël Dolla was born in 1945 in Nice.

Starting in 1963, Dolla attends Théâtre Total at the Théâtre de l'Artistique hosted by Ben Vautier. He attends many events organized at Théâtre de l'Artistique.

He began studying at School of Decorative Arts in 1963 in Nice, France. Between 1964 and 1966, Nöel Dolla was a student of Claude Viallat at the Nice School of Art. Dolla worked as a house painter in order to finance his education.

In 1966, after a strike and other events, Dolla and six of his friends were kicked out in June with no diploma.

In 1967, he applies for the Prix de Rome, encouraged by Claude Viallat. While in Paris, he discovers texts from the BMPT group. In November, Ben Vautier invites him to show in the exhibition "La bouteille er l'assiette" (The bottle and the plate).

January 3, 1968, he begins his military service in Briançon, France. He produced many self-portraits on cardboard, most have disappeared today. After three months, he discharged from the army on medical grounds.

The Supports/Surfaces group formed in 1969, where Dolla was the youngest member.

From 1969 until today, he works with landscapes titled "Space Restructuring."

In 1974, Dolla receives his DNSEP (degree in plastic arts) from the Ecole des Beuax-Arts fine arts school of Marseille. He then passes the "concours" exam to become the directing professor of research in plastic arts at the École nationale des Arts Décoratifs in Nice at Villa Arson.

In 1978, he opens a non-profit exhibit dedicated to contemporary art in Nice; La Caisse.

Dolla opens a farming shop in 1984 to give work to his two younger brothers, Serge and Patrick, in hopes to fight their addiction.

Throughout the 1990s, Dolla is invited to exhibit his works from the Supports/Surfaces era, as well as other exhibitions independent from Supports/Surfaces.

== Work ==
Noël Dolla's first paintings were strongly influenced by Claude Viallat's work.

During the Supports/Surfaces movement (1969-1972) Noël Dolla's works focused on the deconstruction of painting and the use of familiar objects that appear in everyday life. He used materials like dishtowels, pillowcase, muslin, and handkerchiefs in place of a canvas This is part of a greater concept explored in the Supports/Surfaces movement.

He did much research on medium and material of an artwork, investigating the possibility of painting at the scale of nature. He started working with rolls of tarlatan cloth, where he soaks the strips in paint concoctions before unfolding them in space.

Noël Dolla leaves this comment on the origins of the dot that appears in most of his works:

"The dot research came from a text by BMPT that I read while in Paris, in 1967. In 1968, I created a triptych wherein each stretch of fabric consisted of two distinct parts: one red, the other almost black. It was a relatively simple pictorial gesture. So I wondered what I should do next: vary the colors ad infinitum? Enlarge the shape? In the end, I reduced the shape to a line. Then, I decided to reduce this line to the origins of the line, which is a dot. And so I put a dot on each stretch of fabric and multiplied the dot on the same surface: three points like a complex number, like a sign of identification, like leaving my own mark as a subject."

This artist has explored other styles of working like finger-painted monochromes, land-art involving colored dots on beaches and mountains, minuscule fishing-lure sculptures, and complex installations using yards of unrolled muslin fabric.

In 1972, Alexandre de la Salle dedicates a solo exhibition to Dolla's work in his gallery at Saint Paul de Vence.

Starting with his series Croix and Tarlatanes in 1975–76, color becomes more of a focus. He experiments with wooden beams, allowing him to create large volume paintings that he calls Caissons. By 1979, he continues to create body-based drawings and exhibits them for the first time at the Foundation Katia Pissaro in Paris.

He develops his works so the fabric no longer rolls from the ceiling to the ground, but folded and then hung on the wall. The tarlatan continues to be dyed through hand-soaking, but the folds accentuate the moiré effect. Restructuraion spatiale n°5 is an extension of the work begun in February 1970 in the Authion mountains. On the pebble beach below the Promenade des Anglais, the artist has three craters dug, each measuring thirty meters in diameter and a meter and a half deep. The circles extend from the shore to the seawall. He and his assistants paint the circles using natural pigments.

Dolla takes an entire year to prepare for a performance that he executes on August 5, 1983, at the Cimiez Arena. Restructuration spatiale n°6 subtitled "Body/Building/Painting", is a performance where visual arts and opera intersect.

In 1985, he creates his first steel sculptures, influenced by fishing lures.

He painted a series called Tchernobyl in 1985, in reference to his brothers. He says, "A misleading title, as a denial of the pain my brothers were going through. Abstract art heals nothing."

In 1997, Dolla creates his first Dessins de leurres (Drawings of Lures). They are drawings of digital photos of lures that he makes for fishing.

From 2012 to 2013, he works on a series of wax pieces.

== Selected exhibitions ==
=== Solo exhibitions ===
2021

Visite d'atelier - Sniper, Musée Matisse, curator: Claudine Grammont, Musée Matisse, Nice, France

1996

Peintures, 14/12/1967 - 25/12/1968, Musée des Beaux-Arts de Nice, Nice, France

1969

Propos neutre n°2, Restructuration Spatiale, Cime de l'Authion, France

=== Group exhibitions ===
2019

Unfurled: Supports/Surfaces 1966–1976, Galerie Ceysson & Bénétière

2018

Group show, Galeria Mascota

Cosmogonies, au gré des éléments, Musée d'Art Moderne et d'Art Contemporain

1971

Supports/Surfaces, Théâtre de Nice, Nice, France

1970

Max Charvolen, Noël Dolla, Musée d'art moderne, Céret, France
