= Musée d'Art Moderne de Céret =

Coordinates: 42°29′09″N 2°44′52″E

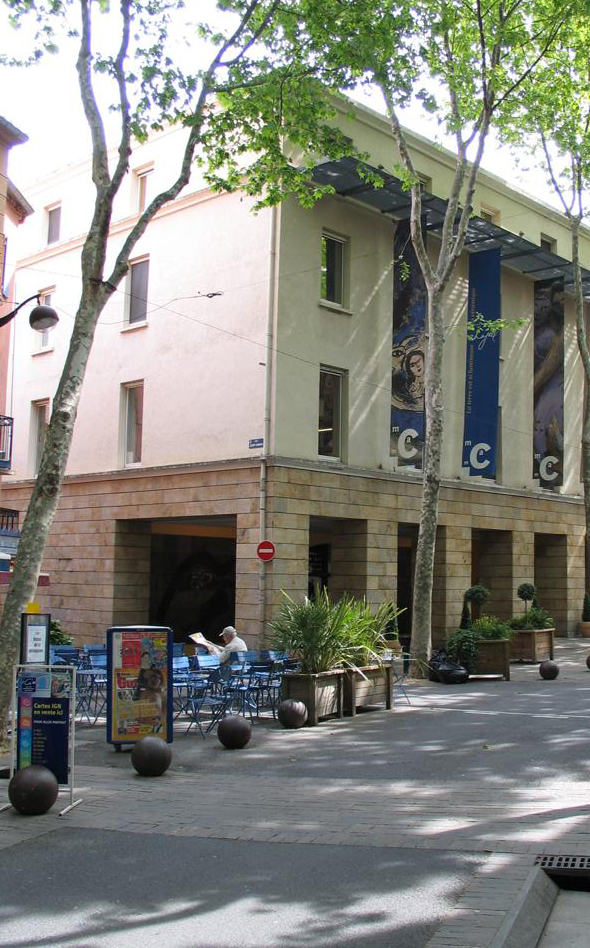
- Established: 1950
- Location: Céret, France
- Type: Art museum
- Visitors: 80,000 (2006)
- Director: Joséphine Matamoros
- Public transit access: Céret Train Station / Céret Bus Station
- Website: www.musee-ceret.com

Le Musée d'Art Moderne de Céret is a modern art museum in Céret, Pyrénées-Orientales, France, created by Pierre Brune and Frank Burty Haviland in 1950 with the personal support of their friends Pablo Picasso and Henri Matisse who were involved in its creation.

== Présentation ==
The Musée d’art moderne houses a permanent collection of both internationally famous and local artists, including 78 pieces by Pablo Picasso – 57 of which were gifts from the artist himself. From Cubism to the School of Paris, from Nouveau réalisme to Supports/Surfaces, the collections of the Museum show the intense relationship between the city of Céret and some of the major artists of the twentieth century: Georges Braque, Juan Gris, Chaïm Soutine, Marc Chagall, Raoul Dufy, Auguste Herbin, Henri Matisse, Miró, Antoni Tàpies, Claude Viallat, and Toni Grand.

== Céret, "the Mecca of Cubism" ==
=== Cubism in the Pyrénées ===
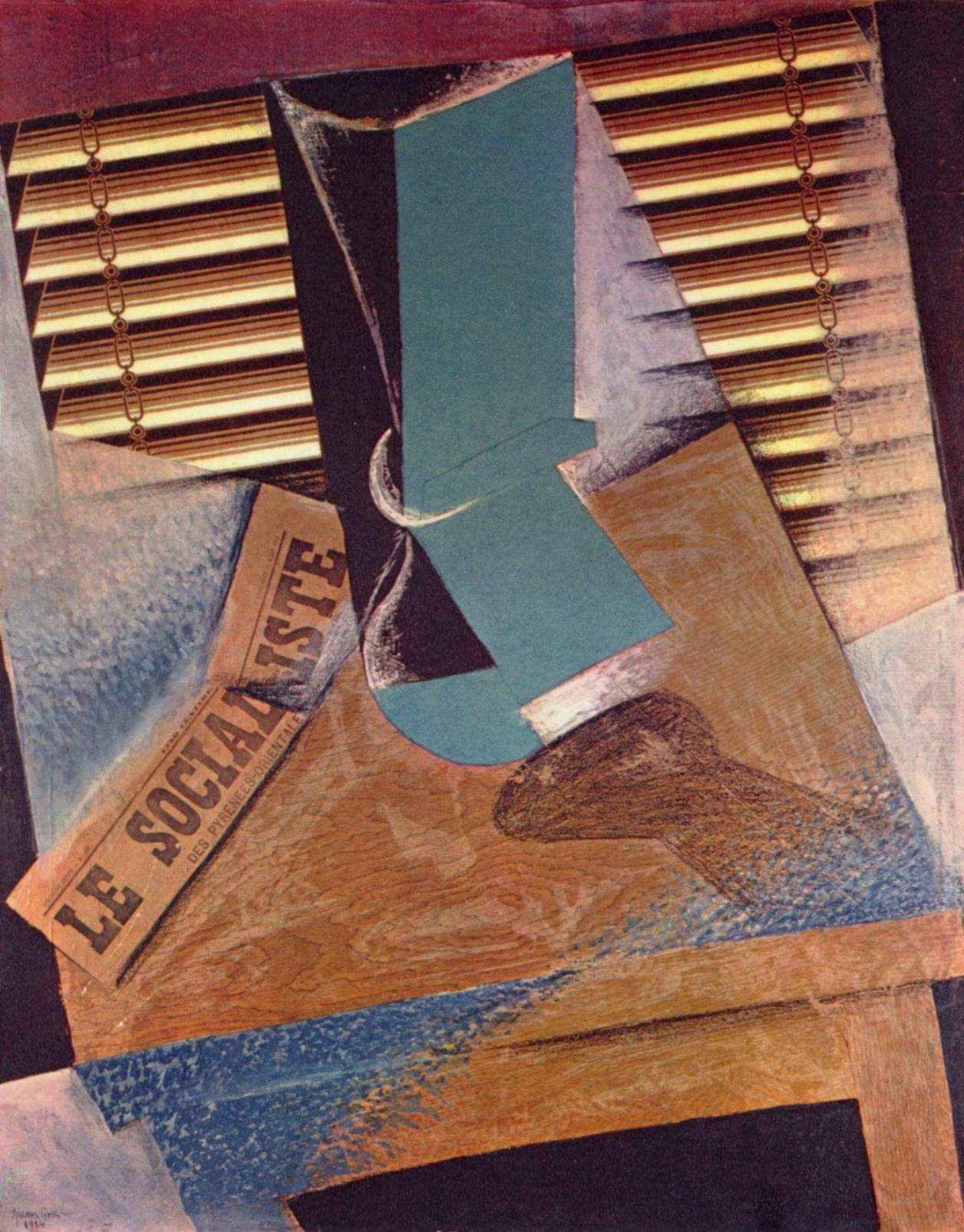
La Jalousie (The Sunblind) (1914) by Juan Gris

In January 1910, the Catalan sculptor Manolo Hugué convinced the painter Frank Burty Haviland and the composer Déodat de Séverac to settle in Céret, a small Catalan village of the Pyrénées-Orientales near the border with Spain. They invited their friends from Montmartre to move in, and from 1911 to 1913, in the midst of Cubism. Pablo Picasso discovered Céret in the summer of 1911 and invited his model and lover Fernande Olivier, and Georges Braque, also a friend of Manolo Hugué, to join him. In 1913, 1914 and 1915 his new lover Eva Gouel also stayed with Picasso and modelled for him in Céret.

André Masson, Auguste Herbin, Max Jacob, Juan Gris, Jean Marchand also moved to Céret, and soon a community of artists was established there. Some, such as Othon Friesz, Albert Marquet, Raoul Dufy and Jean Cocteau returned after the First World War, and were joined later by a new wave of artists from Montparnasse.

=== Soutine in Céret ===
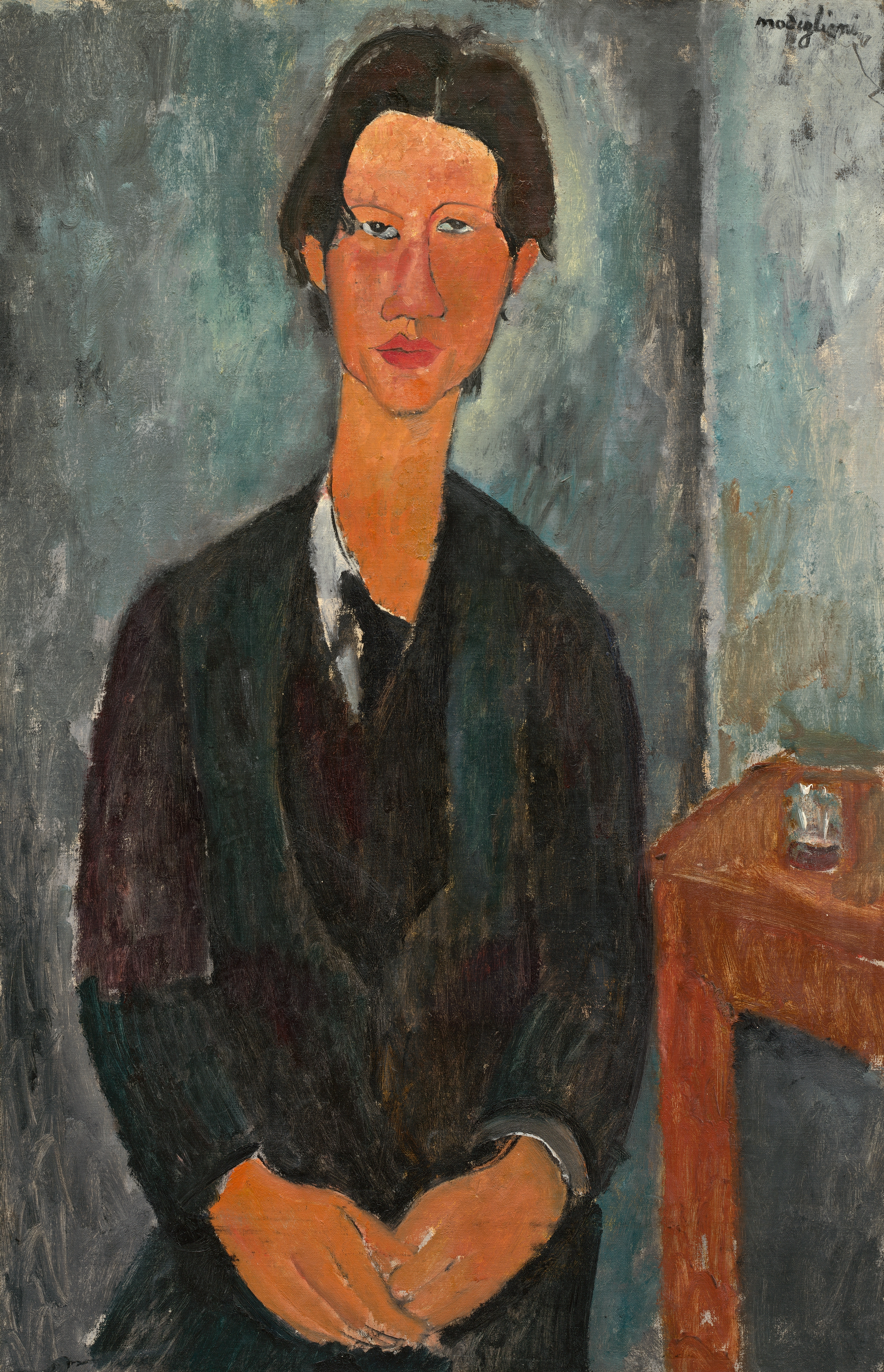
Soutine par Modigliani

In 1919, Pierre Brune invited his former neighbour in the Cité Falguière, Chaïm Soutine, to settle in Céret. Soutine, who was struggling to make an income in Paris where foreigners were stared aggressively, accepted with enthusiasm. Léopold Zborowski, the art dealer of his friend Modigliani decided to support him, and paid for the trip. Michel Kikoine came to visit him for some months. In January 1920, he learned of the death of Modigliani and the subsequent suicide of his pregnant girlfriend Jeanne Hébuterne. Shaken by the death of his friend, he stopped drinking and observed the recommendations of doctors to heal. However, it was too late for his ulcer. Soutine was hurt, angry and wild, and lived outside the arts community. For nearly two years, he painted enormously. In the summer 1920, Zborowski picked nearly two hundred paintings. Then, Soutine made frequent trips between Céret and Cagnes-sur-Mer until 1922.

=== Fleeing the Nazis in Céret ===
A third wave of artists fleeing the Nazis during the Second World War took refuge in the city, such as Tristan Tzara, Jean Dubuffet and Marc Chagall. Pierre Brune, Pinkus Kremegne and Frank Burty Haviland settled permanently in the city.

== Collection ==
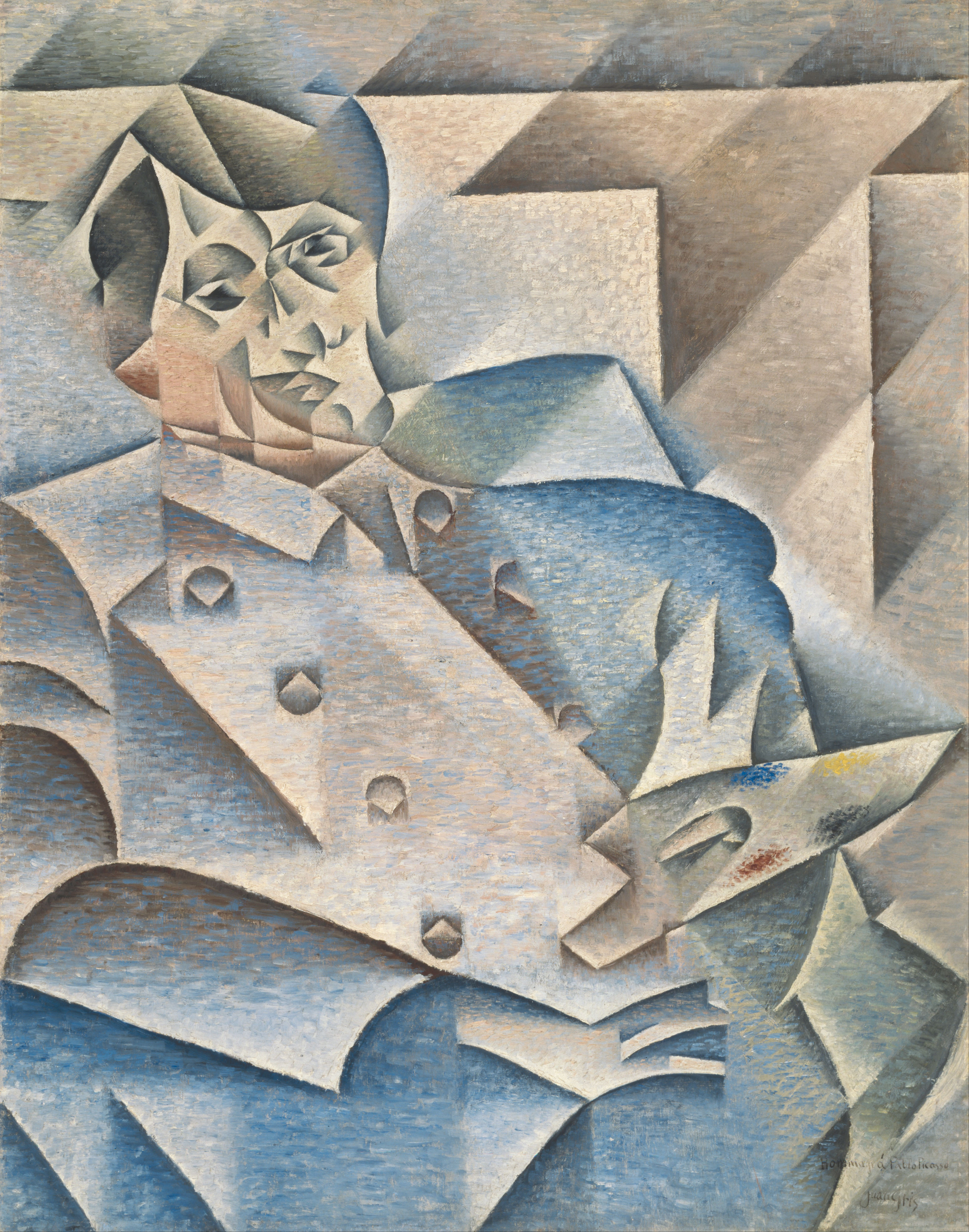
Portrait of Picasso (1912) by Juan Gris

=== Major artists and works represented ===
- Pablo Picasso – le Portrait de Corina Pere Romeu (1902), la Nature morte au crâne et au pichet (1943)
- Salvador Dalí
- Chaïm Soutine – Vue sur Céret, la vieille ville (1919), Les platanes à Céret, place de la Liberté (1919)
- Georges Braque
- Juan Gris – Verre et Journal (1916), La Danseuse (1924), Arlequin (1922), Torero (1913)
- Marc Chagall – Les gens du voyage (1968), La guerre (1943), La crucifixion (1925), La vache à l'ombrelle (1942)
- Auguste Herbin
- Henri Matisse – Barques à Collioure (1905), Raccommodeuses de filets (1905)
- André Masson
- Pinchus Krémègne
- Joan Miró – Femme oiseau (1972), Personnage Oiseau (1979)
- Antoni Tàpies – Fenêtre ocre sur noir (1981), Le bocal (1981), Transformacio n°6327 (1990), Diptyque mural (1990)
- Claude Viallat
- Toni Grand
- Vincent Bioulès
- Tom Carr – the permanent outdoor sculpture group "I by Numbers" (2007)

== See also ==
- List of museums in France
