= Frank Burty Haviland =

French painter (1886–1971)

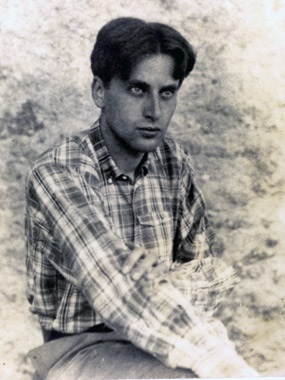
Frank Burty Haviland (ca. 1914)

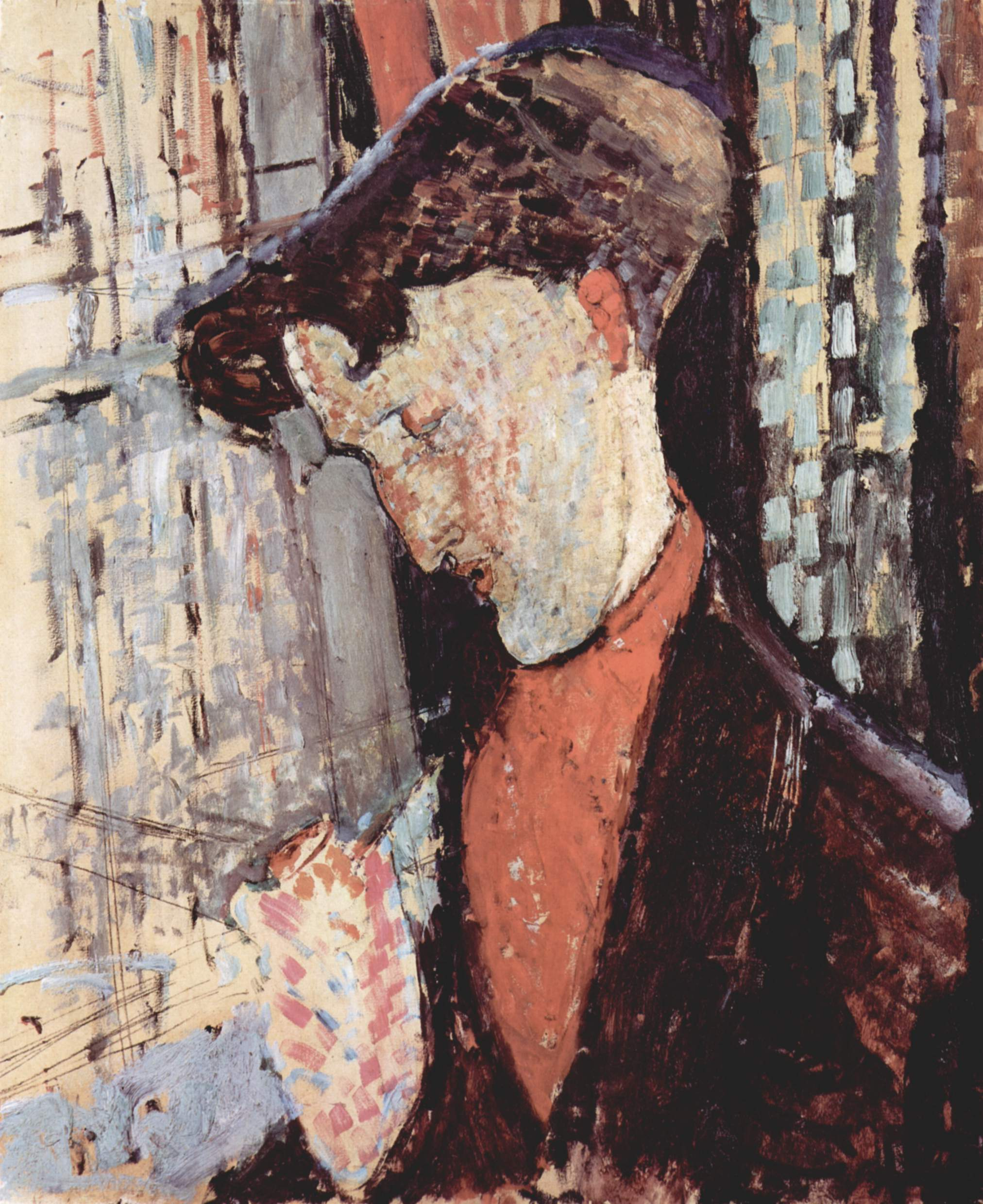
Portrait of Frank Burty Haviland by Amedeo Modigliani, 1914

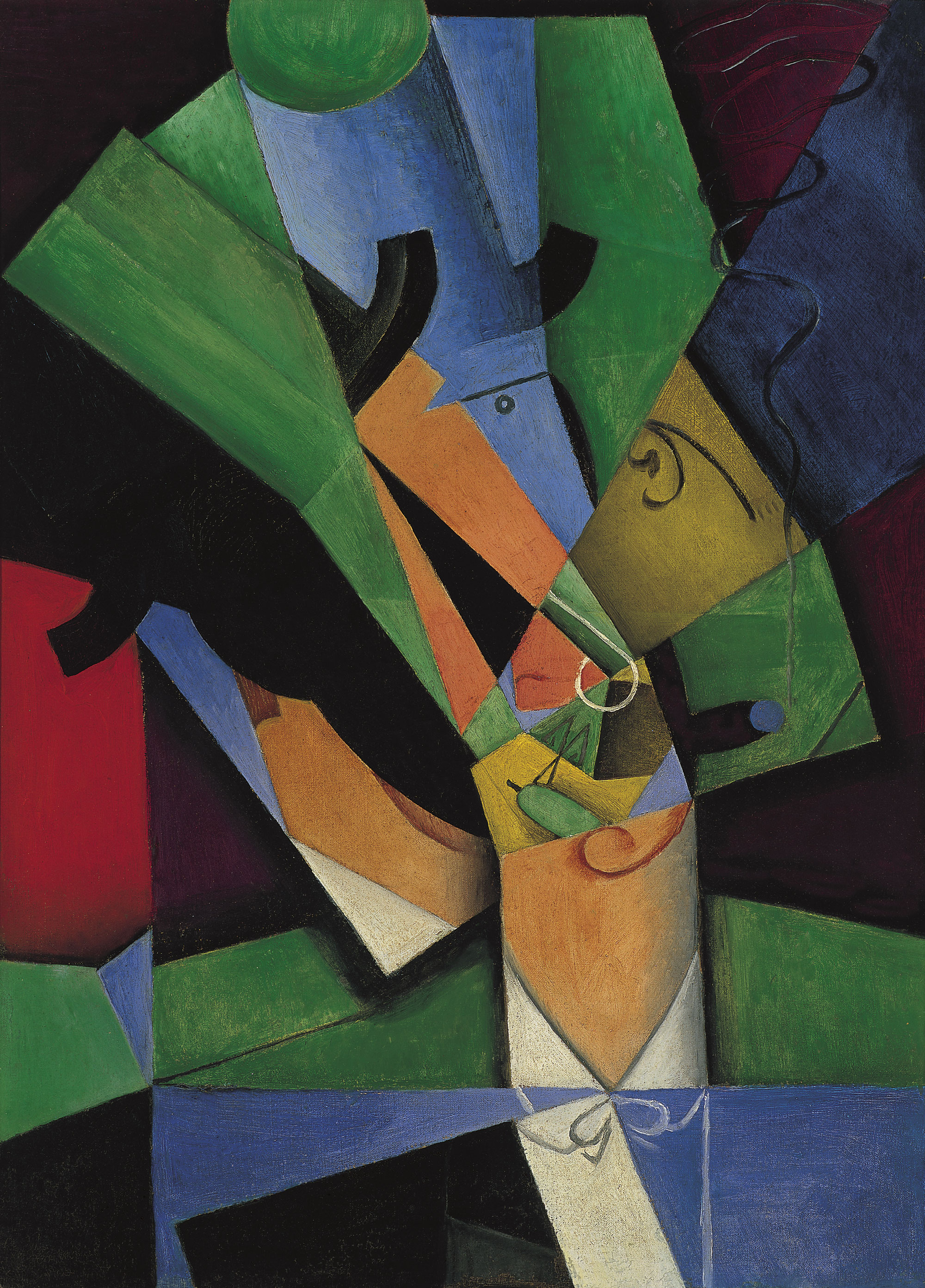
The Smoker, a portrait of Burty Haviland by Juan Gris, 1913, now in the Thyssen-Bornemisza Museum in Madrid

Frank Burty Haviland (16 October 1886 – November 1971) was a French Cubist painter, a friend and early client of Picasso and Braque, and an early collector of African art.

== Biography ==
Frank Burty Haviland (or simply Frank Burty or Frank Haviland) was the grandson of Philippe Burty, art collector and critic who coined the term "japonisme". Philippe's daughter Madeline Burty married Charles Haviland, owner of the porcelain company "Haviland and Company". His older brother Paul Haviland was a photographer and writer.

Burty was born in Limoges in 1886 (some sources give 1879 as his date of birth, less than eight months before the birth of his brother Paul). He studied music with Ricardo Viñes, when he met Déodat de Séverac, who introduced him to Manolo Hugué. The three became friends, and through Manolo Burty got into close contact with the Cubist painters in Paris.

In 1909, Burty bought Picasso's Factory at Horta de Ebro. In 1910, Burty went to the South of France with Manolo and De Séverac, and he bought a monastery in Céret, in the French Pyrenees, which became the center of the so-called School of Céret until 1914. It included some of the most important painters of the time, with Pablo Picasso, Juan Gris, Georges Braque, Max Jacob and Auguste Herbin. Burty Haviland married Joséphine Laporta, a girl from Céret, in 1914.

Burty was portrayed by Amedeo Modigliani in 1914, and is probably also the subject of the 1913 The Smoker by Juan Gris. Chaïm Soutine's Le Rouquin from 1917 to 1919 is also supposed to be a portrait of Burty. His bust was made by his friend Manolo Hugué.

In April 1914, he had a solo exhibition at the 291 gallery of Alfred Stieglitz. In 1915, his work was included in the first exhibition in Marius de Zayas' "Modern Gallery" in New York City, together with works by Picasso, Braque, de Zayas, Francis Picabia, and others. His work was also included in exhibitions in that gallery over the next few years.

In November 1917, Burty had a solo exhibition at the Galerias Dalmau in Barcelona, and in 1921, he had a solo exhibition in the Brummer Gallery in New York. His later style was more classical, moving away from the Cubism of his early career.

Burty lived most of his life in Céret and was one of the driving factors behind the creation the Musée d'Art Moderne de Céret in 1950, helping it to acquire 14 works by Henri Matisse and over 50 works by Picasso. He was the conservator of the museum from 1957 until 1961. When the museum acquired the Burty archive, including 83 paintings and over 700 drawings, in 2008, they held a retrospective exhibition about him from 5 December 2009 until 30 May 2010.

Burty died in November 1971 in Perpignan.
