= Château de Saint-Félix-Lauragais =

Castle in Occitania, France

Coordinates: 43°26′56″N 1°53′23″E

The Château de Saint-Félix-Lauragais is a castle in the commune of Saint-Félix-Lauragais in the Haute-Garonne département of France.

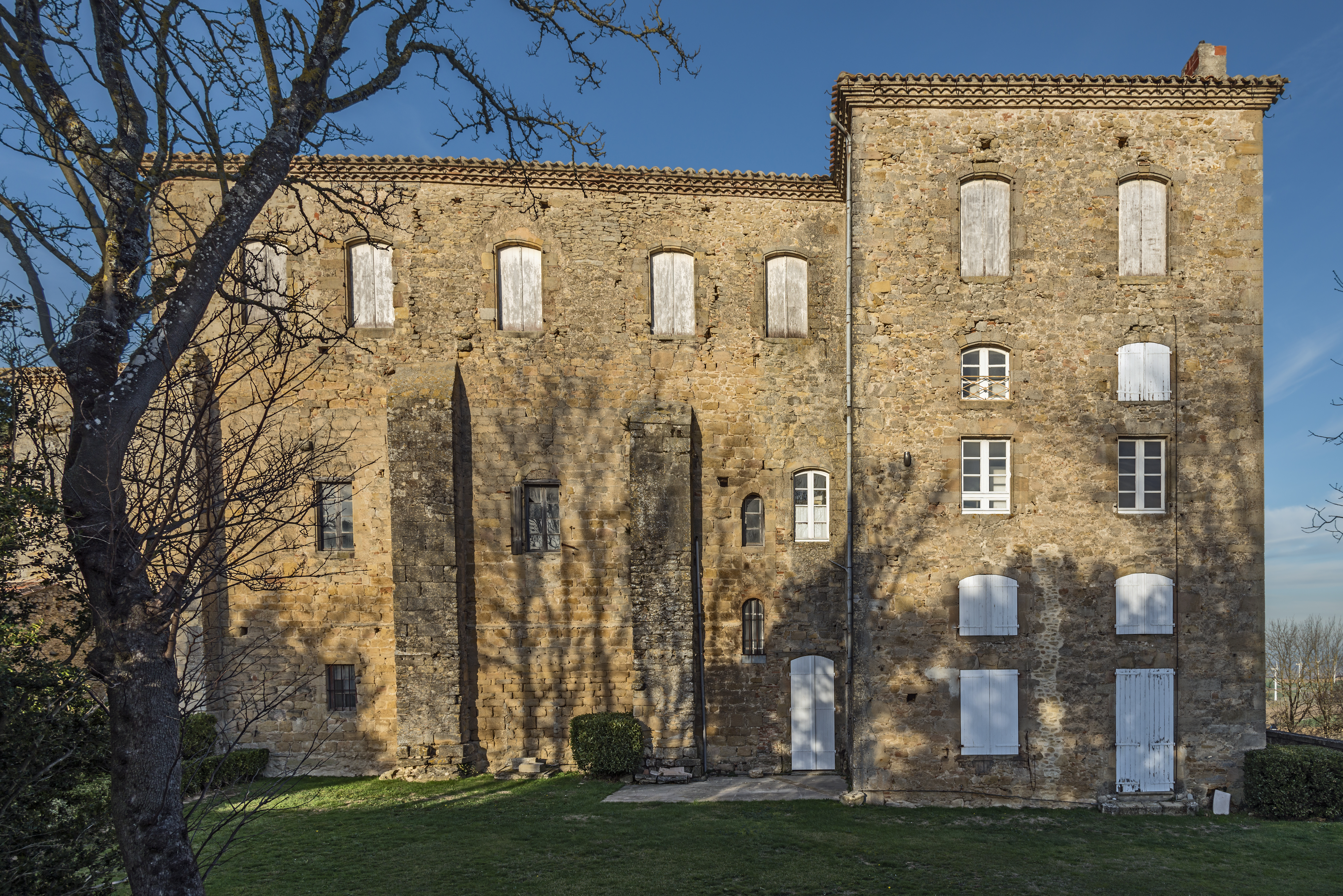
Château de Saint-Félix-Lauragais

The castle was originally constructed in the 11th century. The first Synod of the Cathar church, known as the Council of Saint-Félix was held there in 1167. In the 14th century, the castle was transformed into a country house by a brother of Pope John XXII. The complex includes buildings from the 13th to the 18th centuries.

Since its founding, it had always been privately owned. However, in early 2012 the then owners agreed to sell the château to a family who intended to restore it into a family home. Only a small portion of it was habitable and it was estimated that 2,850,000 € would be required to make it fully so. In late August 2012, the commune of St-Felix-Lauragais, at the request of the mayor André Rey, intervened in the purchase and compulsorily acquired the château at a cost of 1,240,000 €. Despite the economic crisis affecting France at the time, it is not known how the commune will raise the almost 3,000,000 € needed to make the building safe for the public to use and visit. The mayor simply noted "mais le financement est compliqué" (the financing is complicated). At the time, according to the town hall, the commune had a population of only 1,373.

It has been listed since 1994 as a monument historique by the French Ministry of Culture.

== See also ==
- List of castles in France
