= Thermalia =

Coordinates: 41.6343°N 2.1614°E

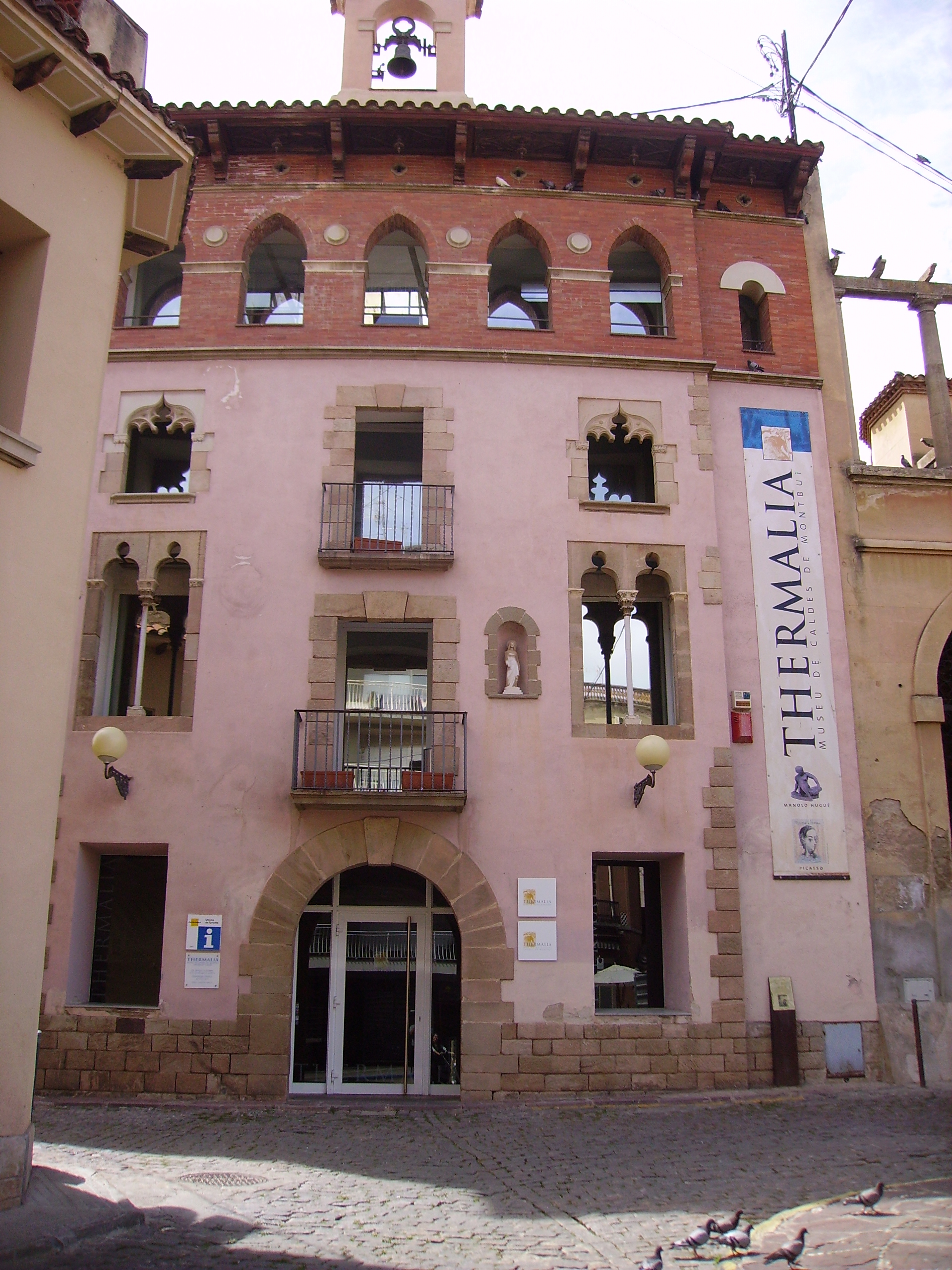
Front of Thermalia Museum

Thermalia is a thematic centre dedicated to the hot spring culture and is found in Caldes de Montbui (Catalonia).

The Thermalia Museum is located in a building dating back to Medieval times and until the 1970s it served as a hospital and thermal bath site. It is part of the Barcelona Provincial Council Local Museum Network. In 1994 the thematic centre was opened to the public and houses the exhibition "Efervescència Balneària" (Spa Effervescence), which explains the social and commercial relations that took place around the hot springs. There is also a permanent exhibition dedicated to the sculptor Manolo Martínez Hugué.
