= Guillaume Besse =

Guillaume Besse may refer to:

- Guillaume Besse (historian) (fl. 17th century), French historian
- Guillaume Besse (ice hockey) (born 1976), 2001/2002 winner of the Charles Ramsay Trophy
