= Philippe Burty =

French artist and writer

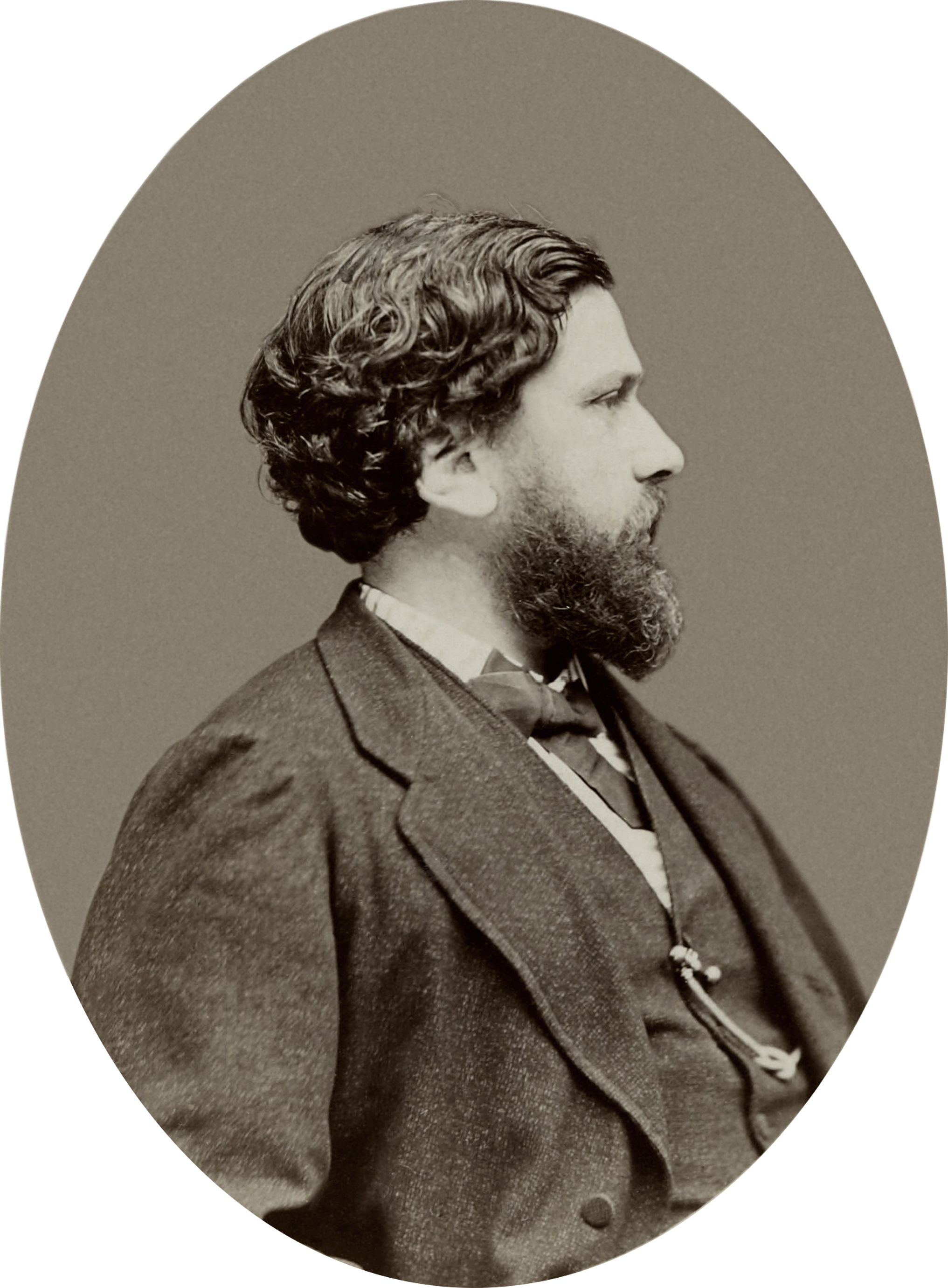
Philippe Burty, Étienne Carjat, 1873

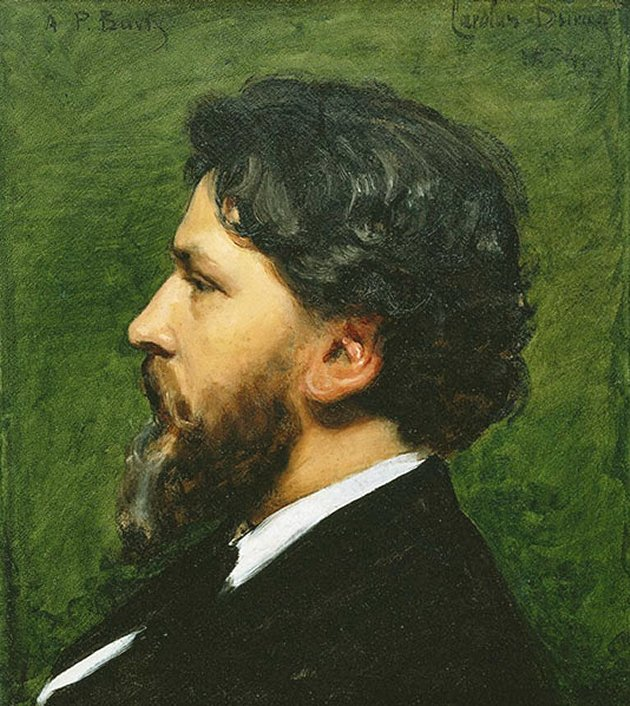
Portrait de Philippe Burty, Carolus-Duran, 1874

Philippe Burty (6 February 1830 – 3 June 1890) was a French art critic. He contributed to the popularization of Japonism and the etching revival, supported the Impressionists, and published the letters of Eugène Delacroix.

Burty was born in Paris in 1830. He was best known for his art criticism, and was also an informed art collector, artist, and lithographer. He contributed to the art magazine Gazette des Beaux-Arts since its foundation in 1859, in which he chronicled the arts and other curiosities and shared his tastes in prints and etchings.

Burty coined the term "Japonism" in 1872 to describe the vogue in Japanese art then current in Europe.

Burty died in Astaffort in Lot-et-Garonne in 1890. He was the grandfather of the photographer Paul Haviland and the painter Frank Burty Haviland.

== See also ==
- A Clinical Lesson at the Salpêtrière – 1887 group tableau portrait by André Brouillet
