= Council of Saint-Félix =

The Council of Saint-Félix was an alleged council of the Cathars held at Saint-Felix-de-Caraman, now called Saint-Félix-Lauragais, in 1167. The senior figure, who was claimed to have presided and gave the consolamentum to the assembled Cathar bishops, was papa Nicetas, Bogomil bishop of Constantinople. Contemporaneous records of the council have not survived, and are only known from a text published by Guillaume Besse in the 17th century from a copy he claimed to have made of a now-lost 1223 text. The historical accuracy of the document, and the notion of an organized movement of Cathars in general, has become controversial in modern scholarship on Catharism.

According to Besse's text, the following Cathar bishops were recognised by the council and consoled by Nicetas:

1. Robert d'Espernon, bishop of the French, i.e. of northern France
2. Sicard le Cellerier, bishop of Albi
3. Mark, bishop of Lombardy, apparently synonymous with Italy
4. Bernard Raimond, bishop of Toulouse
5. Gerald Mercier, bishop of Carcassonne
6. Raymond de Casals, bishop of Agen

The text claims that Nicetas instructed the assembly that, just as the Seven Churches of Asia did not interfere with one another's independence, neither did the modern bishoprics of the Bogomils, and nor must the bishoprics of the Cathars. Boundsmen were appointed to determine the boundary between the bishoprics of Toulouse and Carcassonne: the latter was given a large territory extending from Narbonne to Lerida.
