= Sant Sebastia de Montmajor =

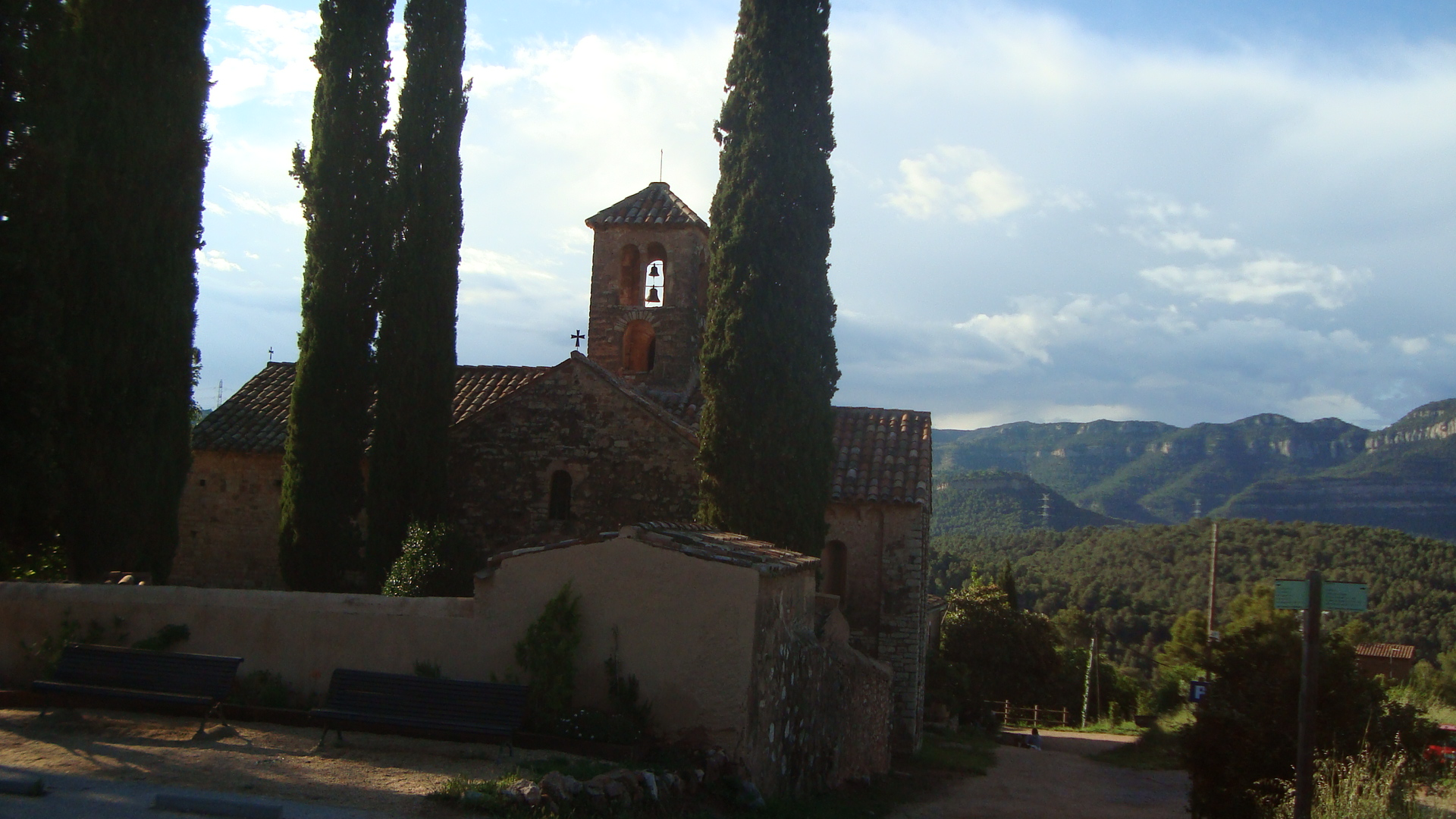
In front of the Church of Sant Sebastià de Montmajor

Sant Sebastia de Montmajor is a town in the municipality of Caldes de Montbui, Spain, located 12 km north west of the municipal seat. A notable a site is the Romanic Church from the 11th century.
