= Guillaume Besse (historian) =

French historian

Guillaume Besse (fl. 17th century) was a French historian. Little is known of his life. He was a native of Carcassonne. By 1635 he was a lawyer, but there is no mention of him later than 1668.

According to Besse, in 1652 he received scrap of parchment from a prebendary of Saint-Étienne de Toulouse. He published it eight years later under the title "Charte de Niquinta" in a three-page appendix to his Histoire des ducs, marquis et comtes de Narbonne. The poorly written "charter" purports to be extracts from three Latin documents copied by Peire Polhan and Peire Izarn in 1223 or 1233. These record a Cathar council held at Saint-Félix-de-Caraman in 1167, a sermon given by a papa (or pope) named Niquinta (Nicetas) at this council and the demarcation of boundaries of new Cathar dioceses in Toulouse, Carcassonne and Agen. The original parchment is lost. Although many historians have lent great weight to the "Charte de Niquinta", others have labelled it a forgery, either of Besse himself or of Peire Polhan and Peire Izarn in the 13th century.

== Works ==
- Histoire des Comtes de Carcassonne. Béziers: Arnaud Estradier Marchan, 1645.
- Recueil de diverses pièces servant à l'histoire du roy Charles VI. Paris:Antoine de Sommaville, 1660.
- Histoire des ducs, marquis et comtes de Narbonne, autrement appellez Princes des Goths, Ducs de Septimanie, et Marquis de Gothie: Dedié à Monseigneur l'Archevesque Duc de Narbonne. Paris:Antoine de Sommaville, 1660.
