= Supports/Surfaces =

Art movement

- Years active: 1966–1972
- Location: France
- Major figures: Claude Viallat; Daniel Dezeuze; Louis Cane; Noël Dolla; Vincent Bioulès; Toni Grand; Bernard Pagès
- Influences: Matisse; Greenberg; Marx; Minimalism; Abstract Expresionism

Supports/Surfaces was an art movement in the late 1960s and early 1970s which came out of the south of France. It has significantly impacted contemporary art. The group combined a material examination of the formal elements of painting with a rigorous political and philosophical stance.

The group re-imagined the place of art in society, formally deconstructing and examining the material components of painting. For these artists, the canvas and stretcher bars (which are traditionally meant to disappear in a work of art) take center stage, expanding and complicating our understanding of the space of painting. Their work was on display at the 2019 retrospective of the group's work at Museum of Contemporary Art Detroit (MOCAD). Their work has been shown throughout Europe including at the Musée d'Art Moderne. Individual artists from the group like Claude Viallat and Toni Grand went on to represent France at the Venice Biennale and have had work placed in the permanent collections of major museums including the Museum of Modern Art (MoMA).

== Origins ==
Coming from the School of Fine Art in Montpellier and the National School of Fine Arts in Paris, the Supports/Surfaces group originated from the south of France. Born in 1938 in Montpellier, Vincent Bioulès was the founding member of the movement. The Supports/Surfaces group was a short-lived movement. Group shows including some of the main artists of the movement date back to 1966 and Impact 1 at the Musée d'Art Moderne. The first exhibition with the title Supports/Surfaces was held in 1970 at the Musée d'Art Moderne Et d'Art and included Bioulès, Devade, Daniel Dezeuze, Saytour, Valensi and Claude Viallat.

While challenging traditional pictorial space in their practices, these artists also expressed their theoretical and a political position within the review Peinture-Cahiers Théoriques. Dissensions appear between the members of the group and the split occurs in 1972.

In June 1969, during an exhibition at the Museum of modern art André Malraux - MuMa entitled La peinture en question, Louis Cane, Dezeuze, Patrick Saytour, and Viallat wrote in the catalog:

"The object of painting is painting itself and the paintings on display relate only to themselves. They do not appeal to an "elsewhere" (the personality of the artist, his biography, the history of art, for example). They offer no way out, because the surface, through the ruptures of shapes and colors that are made there, prohibits the spectator's mental projections or dreamlike ramblings. Painting is a fact in itself and it is on its terrain that we must pose the problems. It is neither a return to the sources, nor the search for an original purity, but the simple exposure of the pictorial elements which constitute the pictorial fact. Hence the neutrality of the works presented, their absence of lyricism and expressive depth."

On a formal level, Viallat summarizes their work: "Dezeuze painted frames without canvas, I painted canvases without frames and Saytour the image of the frame on the canvas."

== Style and materials ==
The Supports/Surfaces movement is characterized by an examination of the supporting structures of painting and sculpture and an exploration of its materials. For artists like Dezeuze and Bioulès the stretcher bar is brought into the foreground, subverting the viewer's expectations of painting and recontextualizing these elements. They did so to undermine traditional hierarchies within art and to emphasis its place in the realm of everyday material reality.

Several of the artists worked with found materials, like Noël Dolla who used tea towels and clothing racks to create some of his work. This practice was shared by Pagès, Toni Grand, Dezeuze, and Valensi among others. The idea of repetition and chance was first explored by Viallat, who repeated the same shape endlessly across different materials, exploring the possibility and extension of the surface within a static form. Dolla was particularly interested in this, creating his signature dot paintings which highlighted the infinite variability of his materials.

Viallat primarily worked with un-stretched canvas, a central feature of the movement shared by Devade, Valensi, Dolla and Cane. This was meant to emphasize the material thickness of the canvas and to extend the surface outside the parameters of traditional painting. Another method frequently used by these artists was ink dyeing. This technique allowed them to further remove the hand of the artist while highlighting the material thickness of their canvas.

Bernard Pagès and Grand worked with sculpture. They created work with wood and other simple or found materials that, instead of emphasizing the artist or art object, chose to examine the inherent qualities of materials and their possible configurations.

== Legacy ==
The Support/Surfaces movement is increasingly viewed as an important and influential movement in 20th century art for creating unique and critically minded work in response to post-war art and the political climate of the time. However, it has only been recently in the US, and in the art world at large, that artists of this movement have begun to be given attention.

This late recognition is for several reasons, including the group's short-lived, often contradictory and critically dense approach. But it is also because of misunderstandings and miscategorisations surrounding the work outside of France. In an article in Hyperallergic about the group, Gwenaël Kerlidou writes how when Viallat had a solo show at Leo Castelli in 1982, "his work was erroneously associated with Pattern and Decoration painting."

On the occasion of the Canada gallery's Supports/Surfaces show in New York City (2014), one of the first for the movement in the US, Sharon Butler wrote in an article for Two Coats of Paint that it was a "welcome group survey of this under-recognized but highly influential movement." The New York Times referred to the show as displaying "missing chunks of recent art history."

Raphael Rubinstein notes in an article for ArtNews that for a long time it was a challenge for American viewers to see exhibitions of Supports/Surfaces work or find relevant material on the subject. However, with recent shows in the U.S.A. such as the retrospective at the Museum of Contemporary Art Detroit in 2019, the group began to reach a larger audience and become recognized for their contribution to art history.

Rubinstein ventures that this reevaluation and newfound appreciation for Supports/Surfaces has to do with the group's relevance to younger generations of artists. He writes: "Why is there an interest in Supports/Surfaces more than 40 years on? The primary reason has to do, I believe, with the existence of clear affinities between Supports/Surfaces and the work of many young American artists. The kindred impulse—to deconstruct painting, to turn to the everyday world for materials, to favor process over image, to reject the brush but not painting itself, to foreground materiality—is seen everywhere in current abstraction."

== Influences ==
Many different philosophical ideas and currents of thought within 20th century art came together to influence the artists of the Supports/Surfaces movement. From this, the group created their own distinct and rigorous discourse around the purpose of art in society and the reinvention of painting. Roberta Smith writes for The New York Times: "Formed after the Paris demonstrations of May 1968, the group combined Marxist thought, deconstructionist attitudes and the influences of late Henri Matisse and Color Field stain painting. Firmly hands-on, its artists pursued a politically aware formalism that, by laying bare the processes and structure of painting, sought to diminish its commodity status without being anti-painting."

Critics often identify a kind of contradiction among influences within the group, which ranged from modern art critic Clement Greenberg to Chinese calligraphy painting. Molly Warnock writes for Artforum that Supports/Surfaces artists mixed several seemingly incompatible elements including color field painting and post minimalism. These contradictions, while leading to some of the many arguments and fragmentation that ultimately resulted in the group's dissolution, also show a distinctive push to combine disparate influences into a new philosophical position. For example the outdoor exhibitions the group was known for in its early years, which took place in fields, on beaches and in the streets and attempted to relocate the place art occupied in society.

Anna Dagbert wrote for Artforum; "They rebelled against the Duchampian idea of antiart and tried, by aligning themselves with the social and political revolt fueled by Marxist/Leninist thought, to restore to painting its symbolic dimension, with the help of psychoanalysis and semiotics."

Another influence on the group was Eastern painting, which they turned to as a way to break from what they saw as the hegemony of Western art. They were specifically inspired by calligraphy and the use of ink and dyes. This was especially true of Devade, Valensi, and Cane.

In this vein the group was also influenced by the works of Mao Zedong, which was common among French intellectuals of this time. It was a perspective some later questioned. In a footnote to his article in ArtNews Raphael Rubinstein gives us a quote from a 2009 interview with Cane that clarifies; "We were unaware of all the crimes of the Cultural Revolution and of the dreadful carnage signified by the reality of Mao Zedong's power."

== Notable exhibitions ==
- Impact 1, Musée d'Art Moderne, 1966
- Supports/Surfaces, Musée d'Art Moderne de Paris, Paris, September 1970
- Supports/Surfaces: The Beginning 1966–1970, Carré d'Art, Nîmes, France, 2017/18
