= Toni Grand =

French sculptor

- Born: Antoine Pierre Charles Grand; 2 February 1935; Grand-Gallargues
- Died: 29 November 2005 (aged 70); Arles
- Known for: Sculptor
- Movement: Supports/Surfaces
- Website: oneartyminute.com/artistes/toni-grand/biographie-de-toni-grand.html

Toni Grand (born Antoine Pierre Charles Grand; 2 February 1935 – 29 November 2005) was a French sculptor. In his early career he was associated with the Supports/Surfaces group. He represented France at the 1982 Venice Biennale and his work has been shown in major museums.

== Biography ==
Grand was born and grew up in Gallargues-le-Montueux, a village in Gard. He went to college at the Armangaud House in Aigues-Vives, where he met Claude Viallat, a member of the Supports/Surfaces group.

He studied literature in Montpellier and then studied for a year at the School of Fine Arts. He met at this time his future wife, Amélie Vasseur.

He began sculpting in 1955. In 1967, Grand exhibited at the 5th Biennale de Paris. He taught at the École des Beaux-Arts in Paris, until 1976, then in Marseille. In 1982, he was chosen along with Simon Hantaï to represent France at the Venice Biennale.

He taught at the Musée des Beaux-Arts de Nîmes in Nîmes from 1986. His last exhibition in France was 1994 at the Galerie nationale du Jeu de Paume in Paris. Grand's had an institutional exhibition in 2000 at the Renaissance Society in Chicago in the United States. In 2024, a major exhibition was organized at the Musée Fabre, in Montpellier, France.

Grand died in Mouriès, Arles (Bouches-du-Rhône) on November 29, 2005.

== Work ==
Grand created sculptures that focused on materiality. He preferred a deconstructionist approach and attempted to explore the pre-existing qualities of his materials. In Artforum Simone Menegoi writes about "Grand's career-long interest in the dialectic between nature and culture, between the human gesture that appropriates and transforms and the materials to which it is applied."

Grand used a variety of different materials in his work. His early sculptures, up until the end of the 1960s, were often made with lead, aluminum and steel. From the late 1960s to the mid-1970s he worked primarily with wood. During the late 1970s he began to experiment with synthetic resins applied to wrap stones, wood, bones and even fish.

== Exhibitions ==
=== Solo exhibitions ===
- 1986: contemporary galleries, Center Georges-Pompidou, Paris.
- 1994: national gallery of the Jeu de Paume.
- 2000: Renaissance Society, Chicago, USA.
- 2013: MAMCO, Geneva, Switzerland.
- 2024: Fabre museum, Montpellier, France.

=== Group exhibitions ===
- 1984: An international survey of recent painting and sculpture, Museum of Modern Art, New York.
- 1987: The era, Fashion, Morality, Passion, Center Georges-Pompidou, Paris.

== Collections ==
Grand's work is held in the following permanent collections:

- Centre Pompidou, Paris: 22 works (as of 5 May 2022)
- Museum of Modern Art, New York: 1 work (as of 5 May 2022)
