= Manolo (sculptor) =

Catalan-Spanish sculptor (1872-1945)

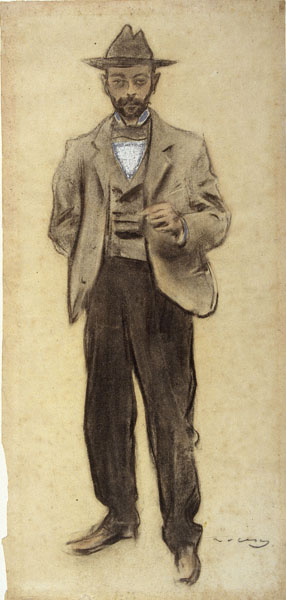
Manolo Hugué seen by Ramon Casas, portrait conserved at MNAC.

Manuel Martinez Hugué (29 April 1872 – 17 November 1945), better known simply as Manolo Hugué or Manolo, was a Spanish sculptor in the noucentisme movement. Although a friend of Pablo Picasso, his style was much closer to that of Aristide Maillol.

== Biography ==
Manolo was born in Barcelona in 1872, the son of a general who soon abandoned his child to go fight in the Ten Years' War, and of a mother who died when Manolo was still young. He was friends with Pablo Picasso and a part of the circle at the 4 Gats, and lived in Paris from 1900 to 1909, where he was one of the people welcoming Picasso and introducing him to the artistic circles of the city. He was one of Picasso’s closest friends at the Bateau Lavoir, together with people like Guillaume Apollinaire and Max Jacob.

In Paris, Manolo mostly worked on small sculptures and on jewellery to make a living. Some of his jewelry was retailed by A. Arnould. He was married to Jeanne de Rochette, known as Totote, a barmaid from around Montmartre, in or shortly before 1910. They had an adopted daughter Rosa Jordana, called Rosita. Both Rosita and Totote were drawn in pencil by Picasso in 1954.

In 1910, together with Frank Burty Haviland and Déodat de Séverac he went to Céret, soon followed for short or long periods by most of the Cubist artists, including Picasso, Georges Braque, Max Jacob and Juan Gris. He installed himself in the cloister bought by Burty Haviland, where Picasso took over the first floor. He started working on larger sculptures, including the Monument for Déodat de Séverac in 1923, and a Monument for the Dead in 1924. Due to health problems, mainly arthritis, he again had to scale back his work.

Manolo stayed in Céret until 1928, when he moved back to Spain, to the spa town Caldes de Montbui, the birth town of his grandmother, seeking relief for his arthritis.

He was supported by Daniel-Henry Kahnweiler from 1912 until 1933, and participated in the 1913 Armory Show. Many group and individual exhibitions followed. He was made a member of the Reial Acadèmia Catalana de Belles Arts de Sant Jordi.

In 1932, he had a large solo exhibition at the Grand Palais in Paris.

Manolo died in the spa town of Caldes de Montbui, on 17 November 1945. After his death, his widow Totote stayed for a while with the Comte and Comtesse de Lazerme, rich art patrons from Perpignan, and lived otherwise at the Manolo house in Caldes, until her death in 1971.

Manolo’s house in Caldes has been turned into the Museu Thermalia, housing the Manolo Fund, which includes apart from works by and information on Manolo, also about 100 works by Picasso.

The personal papers of Manolo Hugué are preserved in the Biblioteca de Catalunya.

== In popular fiction ==
In the 2013 Spanish film La banda Picasso, Manolo is played by Jordi Vilches.
