= Déodat de Séverac =

French composer (1872–1921)

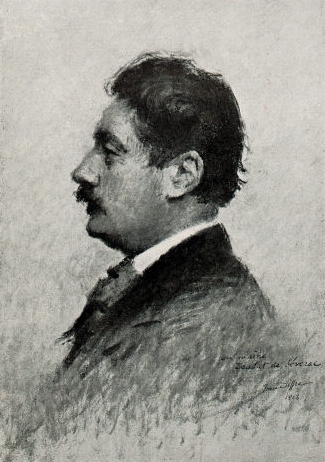
Séverac by Jean Diffre (1913)

Marie-Joseph Alexandre Déodat de Séverac (pronounced [deoda də sevəʁak]; 20 July 1872 – 24 March 1921) was a French composer.

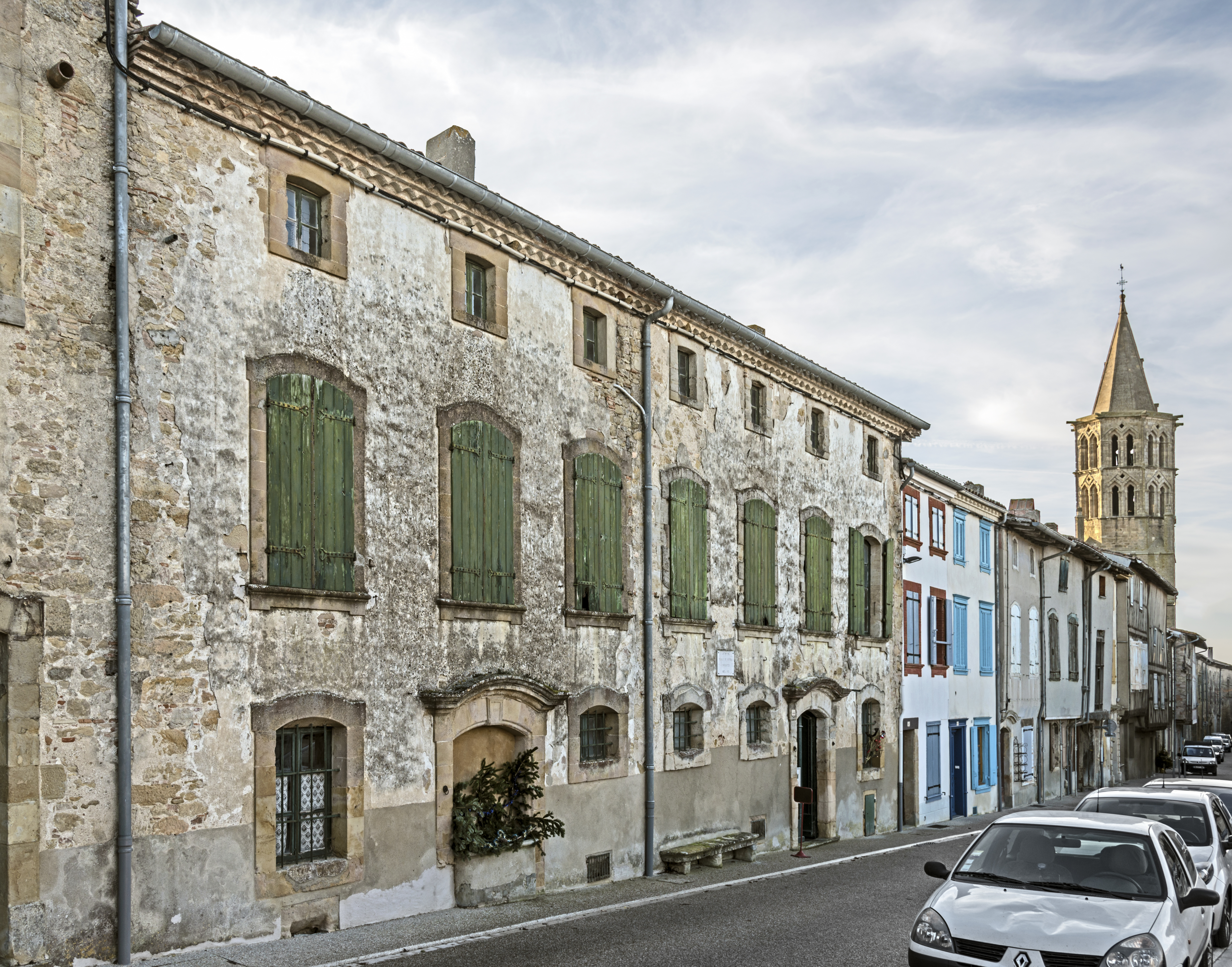
Birth home in Saint-Félix-Lauragais.

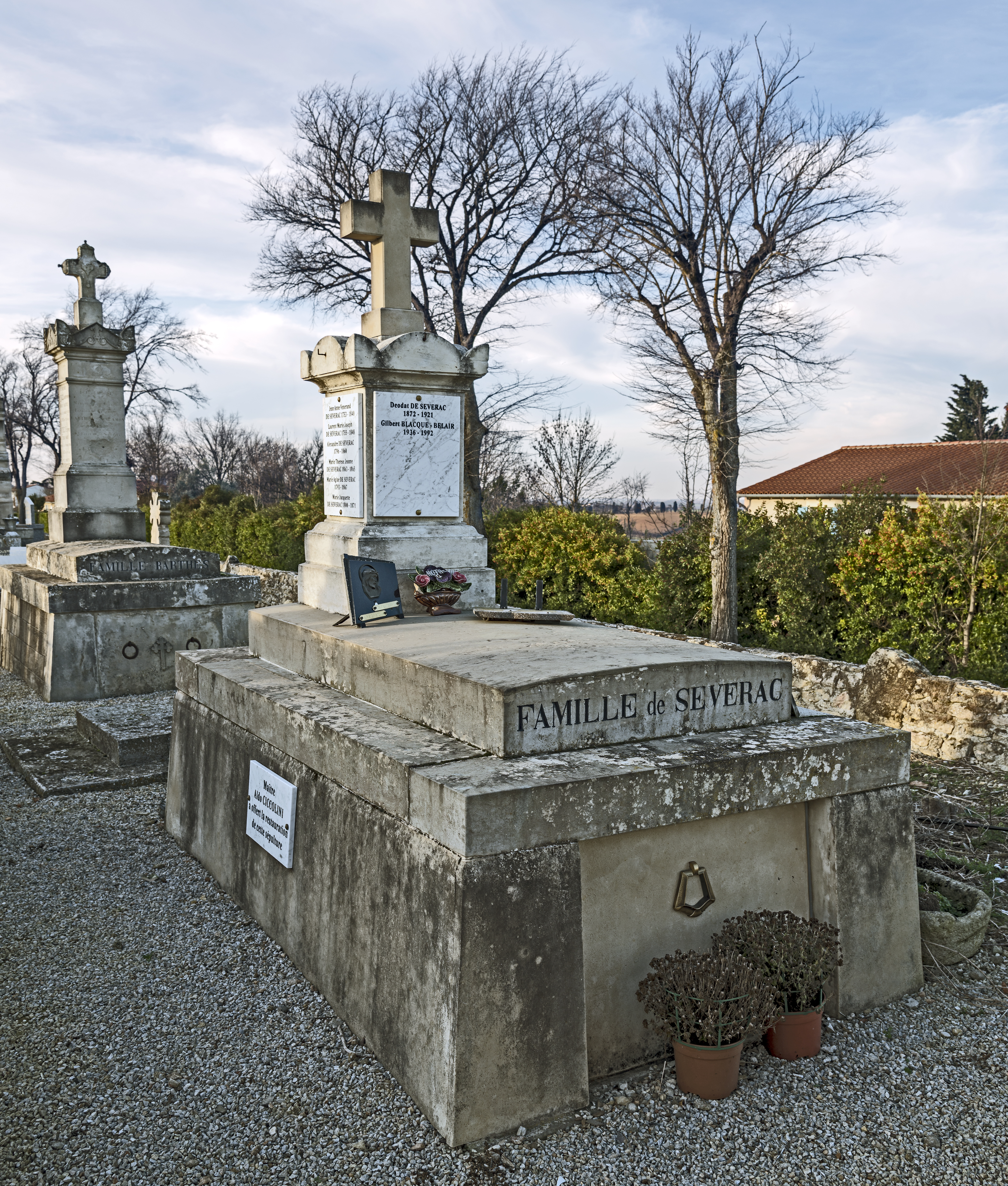
Tomb of Séverac.

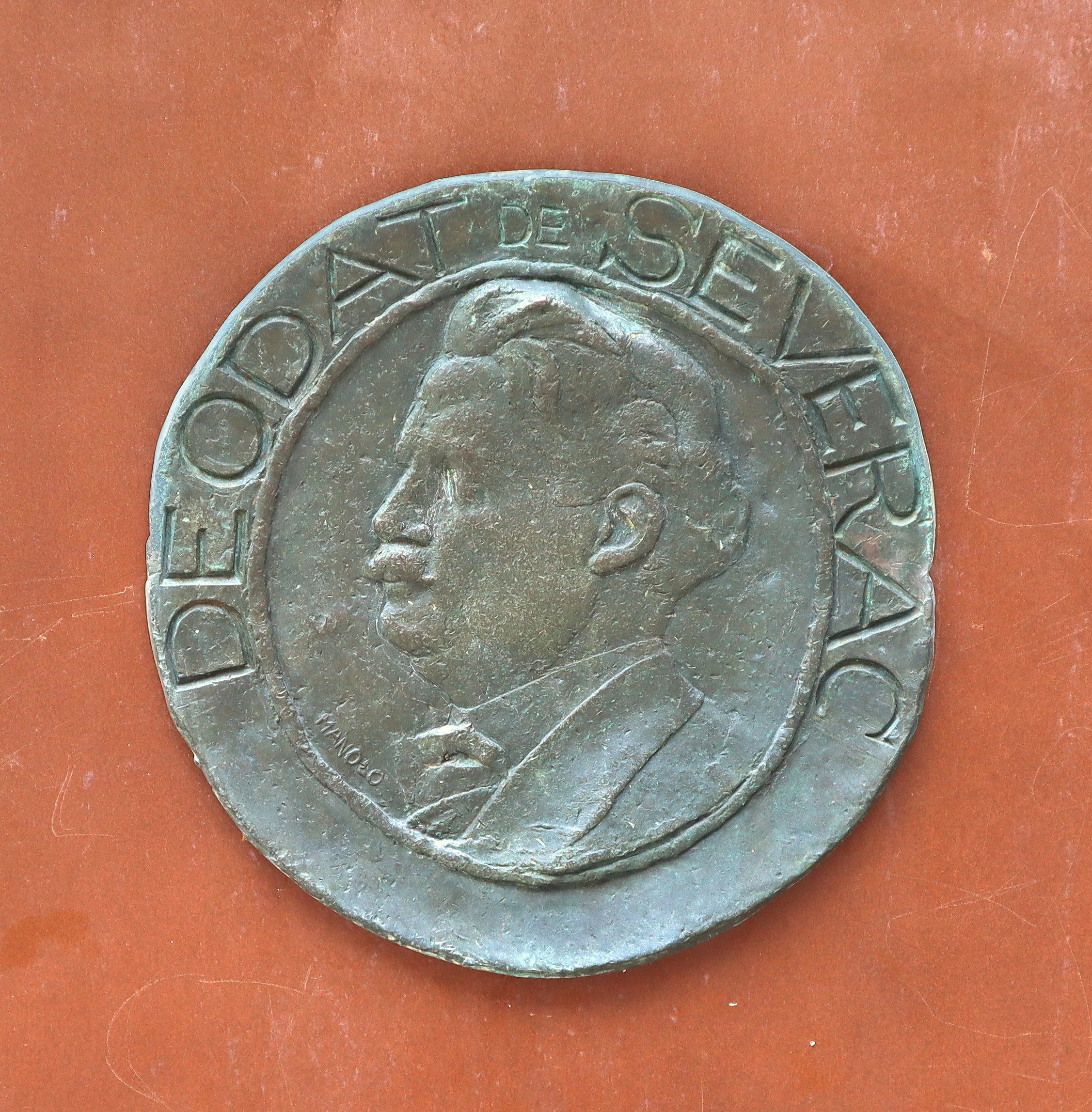
Dedication medal for Déodat de Séverac at the sculpture "La Catalane" by Manolo Martínez Hugué in Céret.

== Life ==
Séverac was born in Saint-Félix-de-Caraman, Haute-Garonne. He descended from a noble family, profoundly influenced by the musical traditions of his native Languedoc.

He first studied in Toulouse, then later moved to Paris to study under Vincent d'Indy and Albéric Magnard at the Schola Cantorum, an alternative to the training offered by the Conservatoire de Paris. There he took organ lessons from Alexandre Guilmant and worked as an assistant to Isaac Albéniz. He returned to the southern part of France, where he spent much of the rest of his rather short life. His native south was a region that attracted a number of his contemporaries—artists and poets he had met in Paris. His opera Héliogabale was produced at Béziers in 1910.

He died in Céret, Pyrénées-Orientales, Roussillon aged 48, and was interred in the family grave in his native village of Saint-Félix-Lauragais.

== Music ==
Séverac is noted for his vocal and choral music, which includes settings of verse in Occitan (the historic language of Languedoc) and Catalan (the historic language of Roussillon) as well as French poems by Verlaine and Baudelaire. His compositions for solo piano have also won critical acclaim, and many of them were titled as pictorial evocations and published in the collections Chant de la terre, En Languedoc, and En vacances.

A popular example of his work is The Old Musical Box ("Où l'on entend une vieille boîte à musique", from En vacances). His masterpiece, however, is the piano suite Cerdaña (written 1904–1911), filled with the local color of Languedoc. His motet Tantum ergo is also still in current use in church settings.

== Selected compositions ==
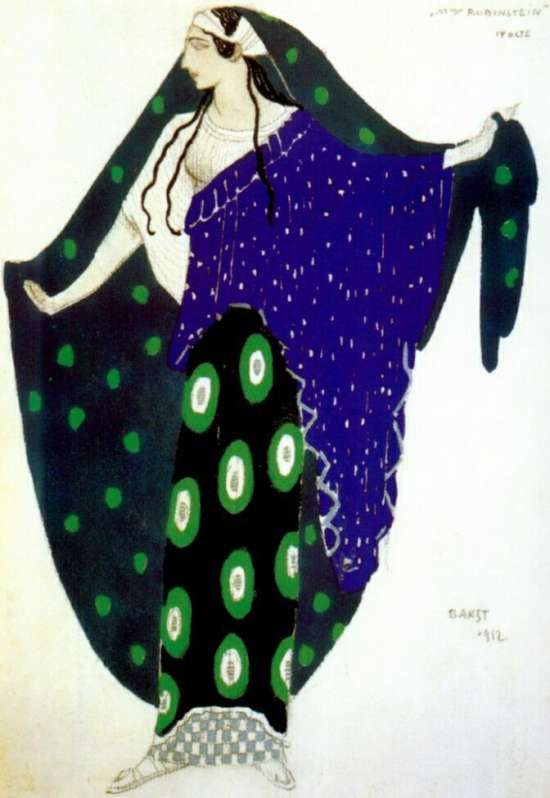
Costume for Ida Rubinstein in Séverac's ballet Helene de Troy, sketch by Léon Bakst (1912)

=== Operas ===
- Les Antibels (1907, lost) based on a novel by Émile Pouvillon
- Le Cœur du moulin, poème lyrique in two acts (1908)
- Héliogabale, tragédie lyrique in three acts (1910)
- Le Roi Pinard, opérette (1919)

=== Works for piano ===
- Le Chant de la terre (1900)
- En Languedoc (1904)
- Le Soldat de plomb (1904), for piano duet
- Baigneuses au soleil (1908)
- Cerdaña. 5 Études pittoresques (1904–1911)
- En vacances. Petites pièces romantiques (1912)
- Sous les lauriers roses (1919)
- Où l'on entend une vieille boîte à musique (An Old Music Box)

=== Chamber music ===
- Barcarolle (1898), flute and piano
- Élégie héroique (1918), violin/cello and piano/organ
- Trois Recuerdos & Cortège nuptial catalan (1919), string quintet and brass
- Minyoneta (1919), violin and piano
- Souvenirs de Céret (1919), violin and piano

=== Choral music ===
- Sant Félix (1900)
- Mignonne allons voir si la rose (1901)
- La Cité (1909)
- Sorèze et Lacordaire (1911)
- Sainte Jeanne de Lorraine (1913)

=== Songs ===
- numerous art songs, including À l'aube dans la montagne (1906) and Flors d'Occitania (1912).
