= Caldes de Montbui =

- Municipality
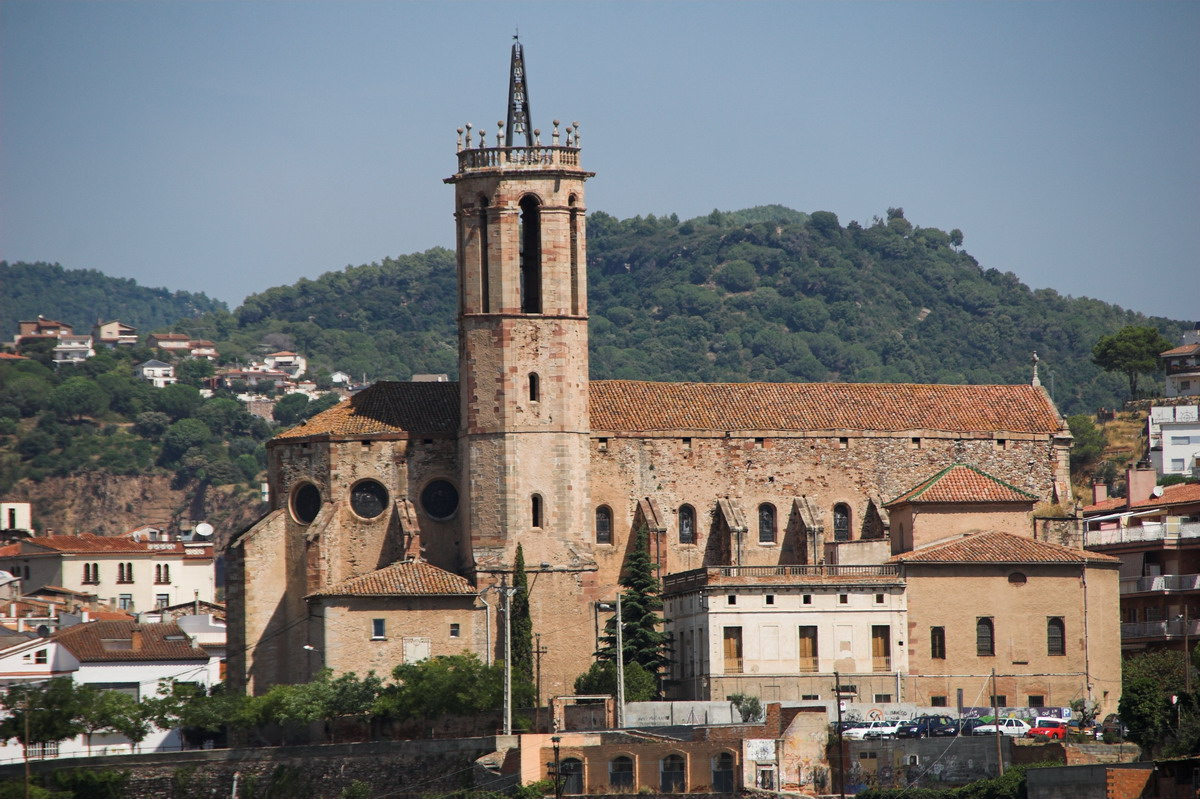

- Flag Coat of arms

- Location in Catalonia Caldes de Montbui (Spain)
- Coordinates: 41°37′45″N 2°10′10″E
- Country: Spain
- Community: Catalonia
- Province: Barcelona
- Comarca: Vallès Oriental

Government
  - Mayor: Isidre Pineda i Moncusí (2019)

Area
  - Total: 37.4 km^{2} (14.4 sq mi)
- Elevation: 203 m (666 ft)

Population (2025-01-01)
  - Total: 18,567
  - Density: 496/km^{2} (1,290/sq mi)
- Demonym(s): Montbuienc, montbuienca Calderí, calderina
- Website: www.caldesdemontbui.cat

Caldes de Montbui (Catalan pronunciation: [ˈkaldəz ðə mumˈbuj]) is a Spanish town and municipality in the comarca of the Vallès Oriental in Catalonia. It is situated in the upper valley of the Caldes river, and the highest point of the municipality is the peak of el Farell at 816 m. It lies about 30 km from Barcelona and it part of its metropolitan area.

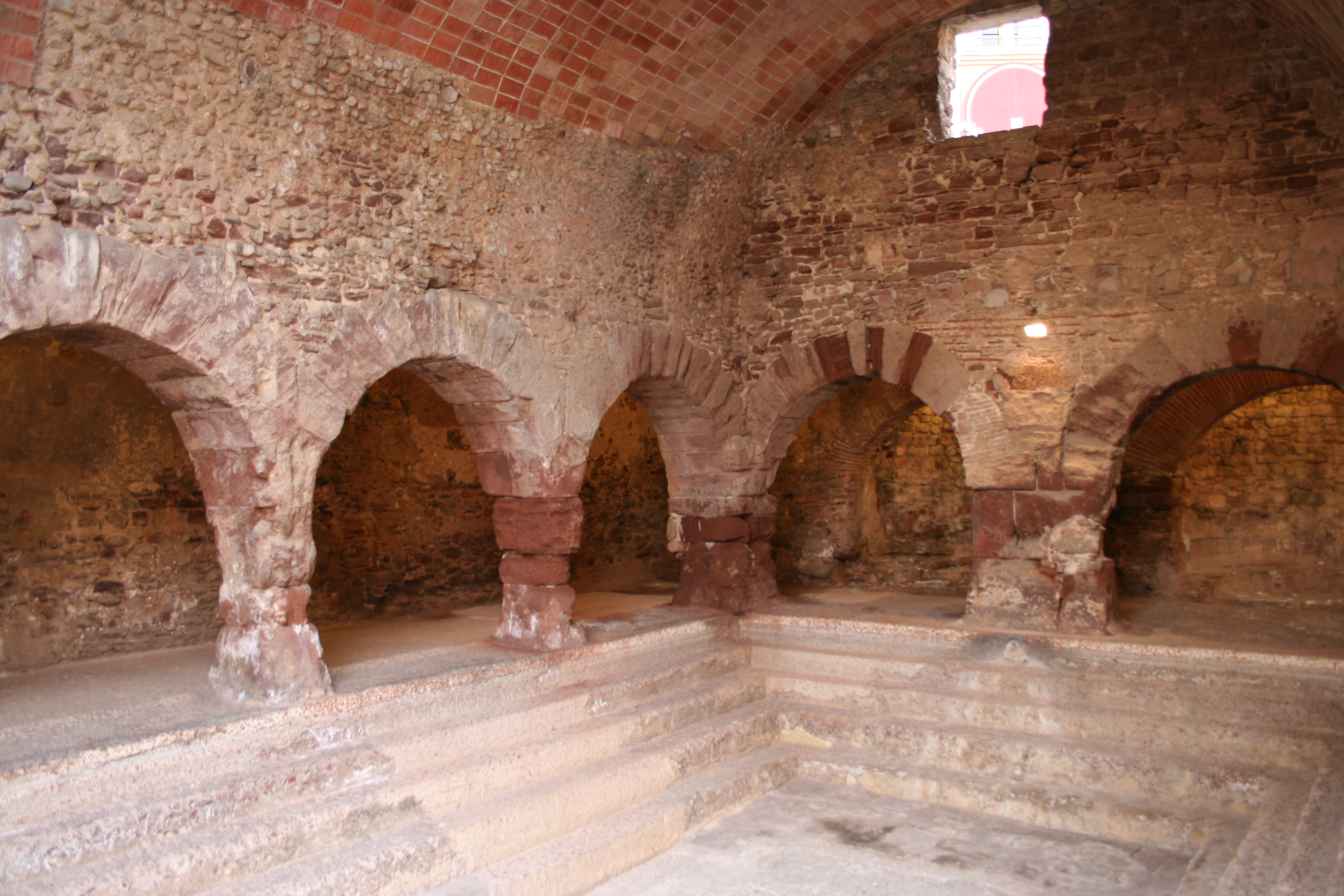
Ancient Roman thermal baths at Caldes de Montbui

The hot springs have been exploited since Roman times, and the remnants of the Roman baths and other Roman buildings can still be seen. The source of la Font del Lleó ("Lion Springs") in the main square emerges at more than 70 °C (158 °F). The town conserves parts of its medieval fortifications and the Torre de la Presó (prison). The hermitage of la Mare de Déu del Remei dates from the sixteenth century, as does the church of Santa Maria with its baroque entrance. The Roman church of Sant Sebastià de Montmajor, in the village of the same name at the extreme north-west of the municipality, is particularly well preserved.

The artist Manolo Hugué lived and worked in Caldes de Montbui, and his house has been converted into a museum displaying both his works and those of other artists. The town also has an archeological museum and the Delger museum of furniture, paintings and sculptures.

Continuing in this artistic tradition is the master landscape painter Ramon Vilanova, a native son of the city and lifetime resident.

== Climate ==
Climate data for Caldes de Montbui (elevation: 203 m (666 ft), data from 1941-1969)
Month	Jan	Feb	Mar	Apr	May	Jun	Jul	Aug	Sep	Oct	Nov	Dec	Year
Mean daily maximum °C (°F)	13.3 (55.9)	14.7 (58.5)	17.7 (63.9)	20.5 (68.9)	23.7 (74.7)	27.7 (81.9)	30.9 (87.6)	29.9 (85.8)	27.4 (81.3)	23.0 (73.4)	17.6 (63.7)	13.6 (56.5)	21.7 (71.1)
Daily mean °C (°F)	6.7 (44.1)	7.8 (46.0)	10.6 (51.1)	13.1 (55.6)	16.3 (61.3)	20.2 (68.4)	23.3 (73.9)	23.0 (73.4)	20.6 (69.1)	16.2 (61.2)	11.0 (51.8)	7.5 (45.5)	14.7 (58.5)
Mean daily minimum °C (°F)	0.0 (32.0)	0.9 (33.6)	3.6 (38.5)	5.7 (42.3)	8.9 (48.0)	12.8 (55.0)	15.7 (60.3)	16.2 (61.2)	13.8 (56.8)	9.5 (49.1)	4.4 (39.9)	1.5 (34.7)	7.8 (46.0)
Source: Sistema de Clasificación Bioclimática Mundial

== Demography ==
1900	1930	1950	1970	1986	2001
3474	4777	4729	8161	10,407	15,536

== Note ==
1. Caldes de Montbui became part of the Vallès Oriental in the comarcal revision of 1990: previously it formed part of the Vallès Occidental.
