= Saint-Félix-Lauragais =

- Commune
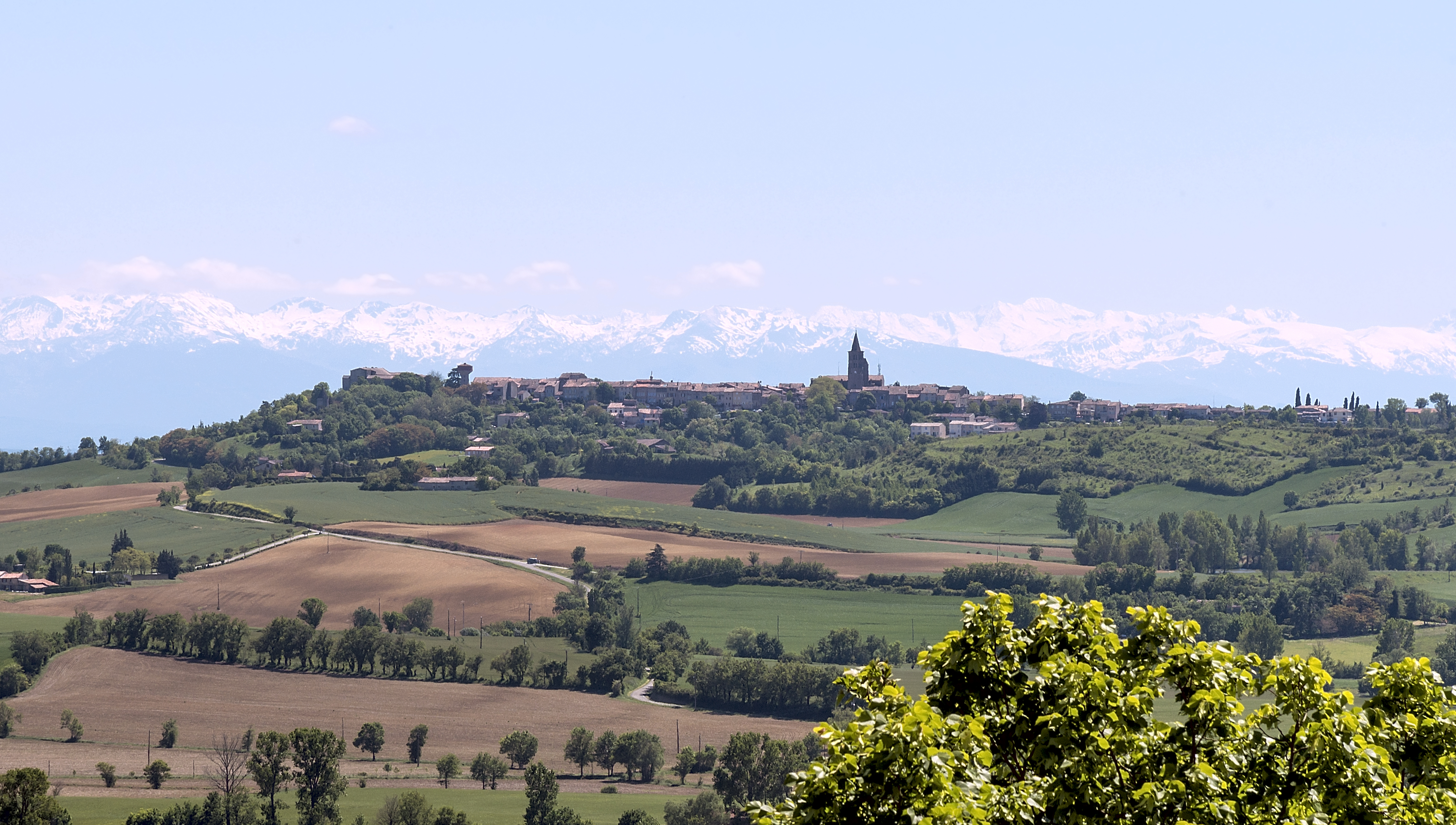
- A general view of Saint-Félix-Lauragais

- Coat of arms
- Location of Saint-Félix-Lauragais
- Location within France Location within Occitanie
- Coordinates: 43°26′59″N 1°53′18″E
- Country: France
- Region: Occitania
- Department: Haute-Garonne
- Arrondissement: Toulouse
- Canton: Revel
- Intercommunality: CC aux sources du Canal du Midi

Government
  - Mayor (2020–2026): Alain Bourrel
- Area^{1}: 51.88 km^{2} (20.03 sq mi)
- Elevation: 321 m (1,053 ft)
- Highest elevation: 341 m (1,119 ft)
- Lowest elevation: 178 m (584 ft)
- Population (2023): 1,252
  - Density: 24.13/km^{2} (62.50/sq mi)
- Time zone: UTC+01:00 (CET)
  - Summer (DST): UTC+02:00 (CEST)
- INSEE/Postal code: 31478 /31540
- ^{1} French Land Register data, which excludes lakes, ponds, glaciers > 1 km^{2} (0.386 sq mi or 247 acres) and river estuaries.

Saint-Félix-Lauragais (French pronunciation: [sɛ̃ feliks loʁaɡɛ]; Languedocien: Sant Felitz de Lauragués) is a commune in the Haute-Garonne department in southwestern France.

== History ==
The village was previously called Saint-Félix-de-Caraman or Carmaing. In 1167 the Cathars held a Council here, attended by many local figures and also by the Bogomil papa Nicetas, the Cathar bishop of (northern) France and a leader of the Cathars of Lombardy.

== Geography ==
=== Climate ===
Saint-Félix-Lauragais has an oceanic climate (Köppen climate classification Cfb) closely bordering on a humid subtropical climate (Cfa). The average annual temperature in Saint-Félix-Lauragais is 13.5 °C (56.3 °F). The average annual rainfall is 673.9 mm (26.53 in) with May as the wettest month. The temperatures are highest on average in July, at around 21.9 °C (71.4 °F), and lowest in January, at around 5.6 °C (42.1 °F). The highest temperature ever recorded in Saint-Félix-Lauragais was 38.1 °C (100.6 °F) on 25 July 2006; the coldest temperature ever recorded was −11.6 °C (11.1 °F) on 8 February 2012.

Climate data for Saint-Félix-Lauragais (1991−2020 normals, extremes 2006−present)
Month	Jan	Feb	Mar	Apr	May	Jun	Jul	Aug	Sep	Oct	Nov	Dec	Year
Record high °C (°F)	17.4 (63.3)	22.4 (72.3)	23.1 (73.6)	28.0 (82.4)	30.3 (86.5)	37.6 (99.7)	38.1 (100.6)	36.7 (98.1)	33.7 (92.7)	30.1 (86.2)	22.7 (72.9)	17.7 (63.9)	38.1 (100.6)
Mean daily maximum °C (°F)	8.3 (46.9)	9.8 (49.6)	13.1 (55.6)	16.8 (62.2)	19.6 (67.3)	24.1 (75.4)	27.2 (81.0)	27.1 (80.8)	23.7 (74.7)	18.6 (65.5)	12.6 (54.7)	9.3 (48.7)	17.5 (63.5)
Daily mean °C (°F)	5.6 (42.1)	6.5 (43.7)	9.2 (48.6)	12.4 (54.3)	15.2 (59.4)	19.2 (66.6)	21.9 (71.4)	21.7 (71.1)	18.8 (65.8)	14.8 (58.6)	9.8 (49.6)	6.6 (43.9)	13.5 (56.3)
Mean daily minimum °C (°F)	3.0 (37.4)	3.2 (37.8)	5.3 (41.5)	8.1 (46.6)	10.8 (51.4)	14.3 (57.7)	16.5 (61.7)	16.3 (61.3)	13.9 (57.0)	11.0 (51.8)	7.0 (44.6)	3.8 (38.8)	9.4 (48.9)
Record low °C (°F)	−7.2 (19.0)	−11.6 (11.1)	−6.3 (20.7)	−1.2 (29.8)	0.0 (32.0)	5.8 (42.4)	10.6 (51.1)	9.2 (48.6)	5.6 (42.1)	0.3 (32.5)	−4.6 (23.7)	−7.3 (18.9)	−11.6 (11.1)
Average precipitation mm (inches)	64.8 (2.55)	48.3 (1.90)	56.6 (2.23)	74.7 (2.94)	87.2 (3.43)	54.8 (2.16)	46.9 (1.85)	34.2 (1.35)	38.7 (1.52)	54.6 (2.15)	61.6 (2.43)	51.5 (2.03)	673.9 (26.53)
Average precipitation days (≥ 1.0 mm)	10.9	9.1	9.4	8.9	9.9	7.5	6.1	4.9	5.9	6.9	9.1	9.1	97.7
Source: Météo-France

== Population ==
Historical population
Year	Pop.	±% p.a.
1968	1,192	—
1975	1,110	−1.01%
1982	1,188	+0.97%
1990	1,177	−0.12%
1999	1,301	+1.12%
2007	1,354	+0.50%
2012	1,311	−0.64%
2017	1,271	−0.62%
2023	1,252	−0.25%
Source: INSEE

== Sights ==
The Château de Saint-Félix-Lauragais is a 12th-century castle which is listed as a historical site by the French Ministry of Culture.

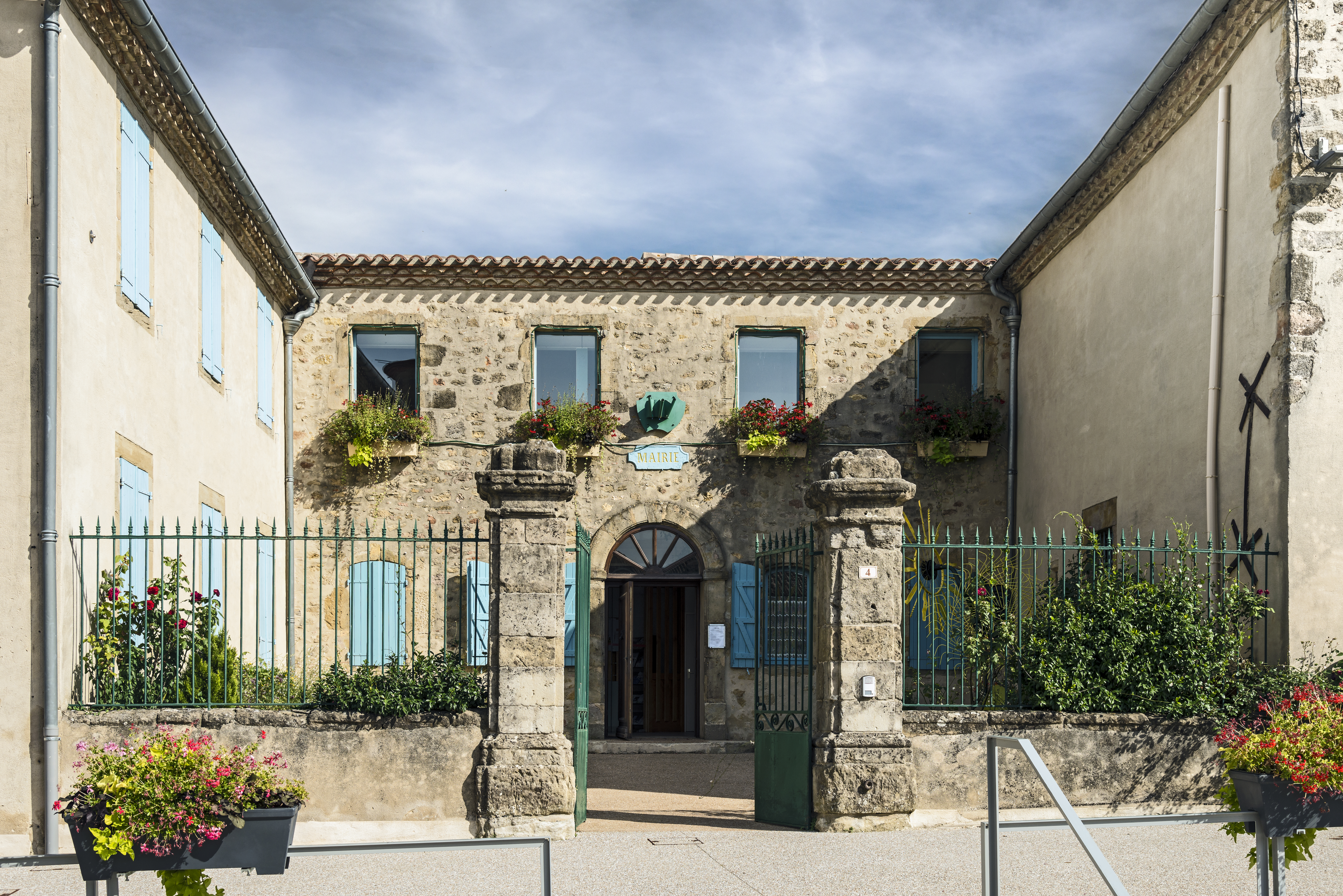
City Hall

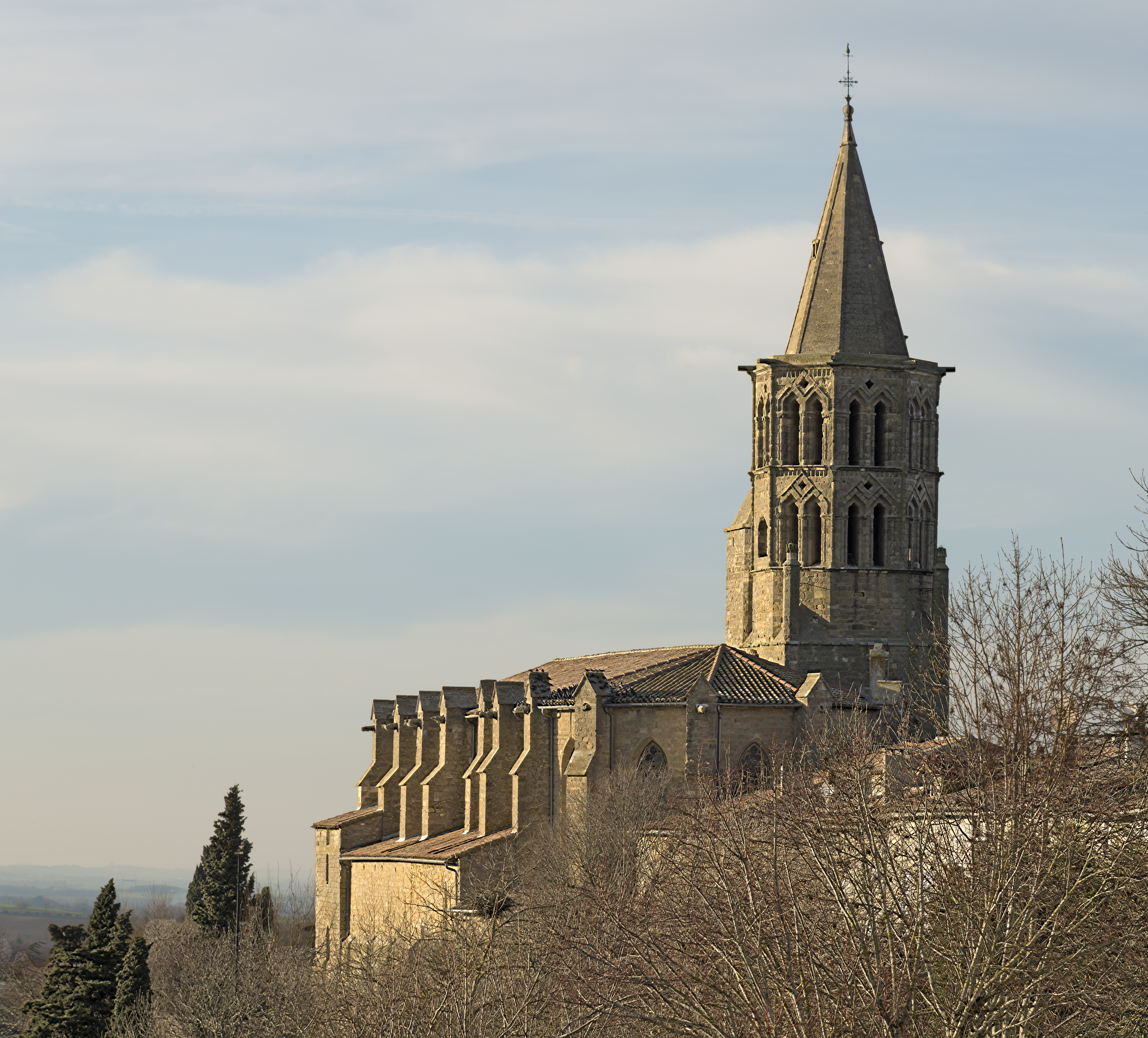
The church St. Felix

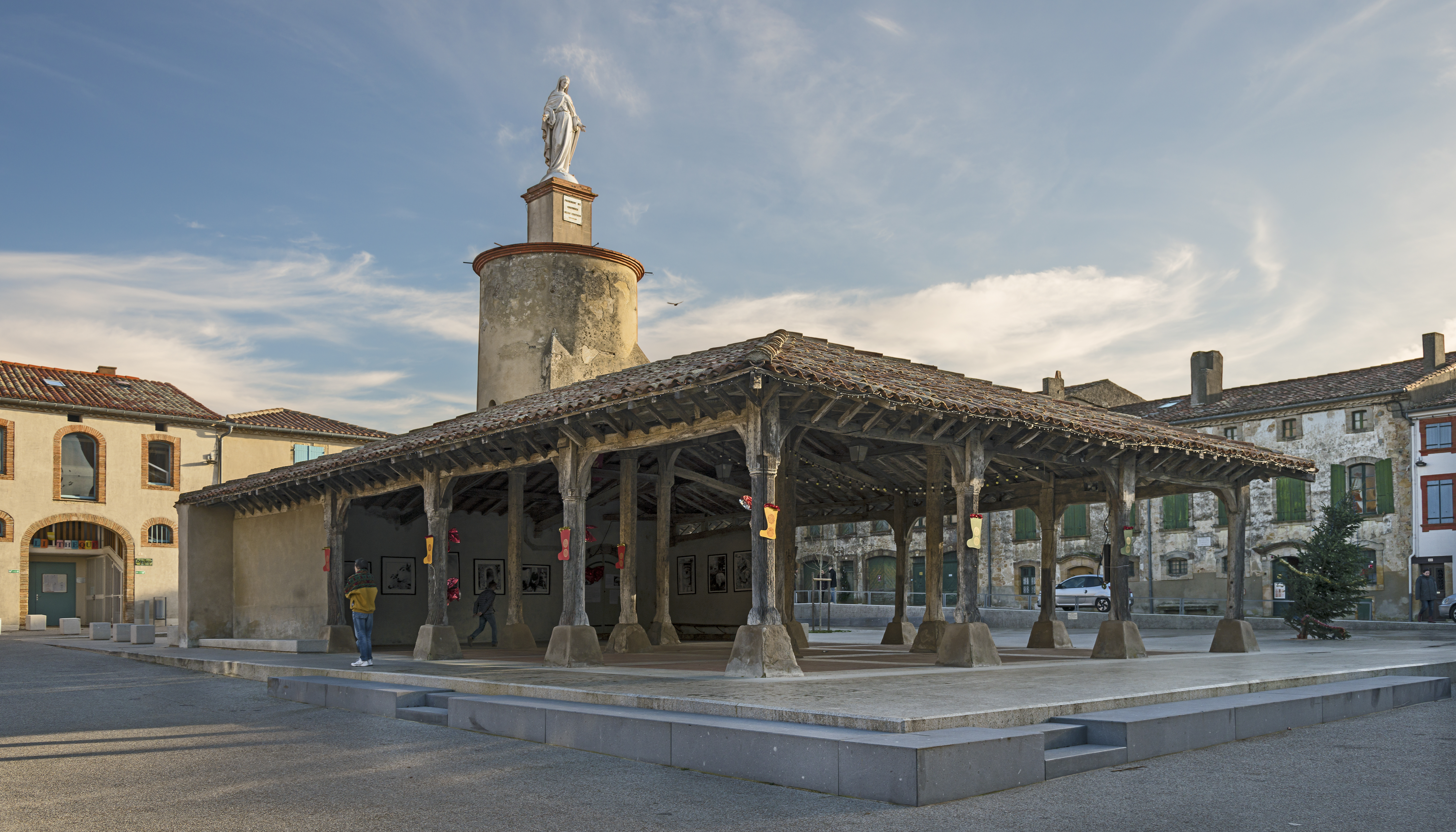
The covered market

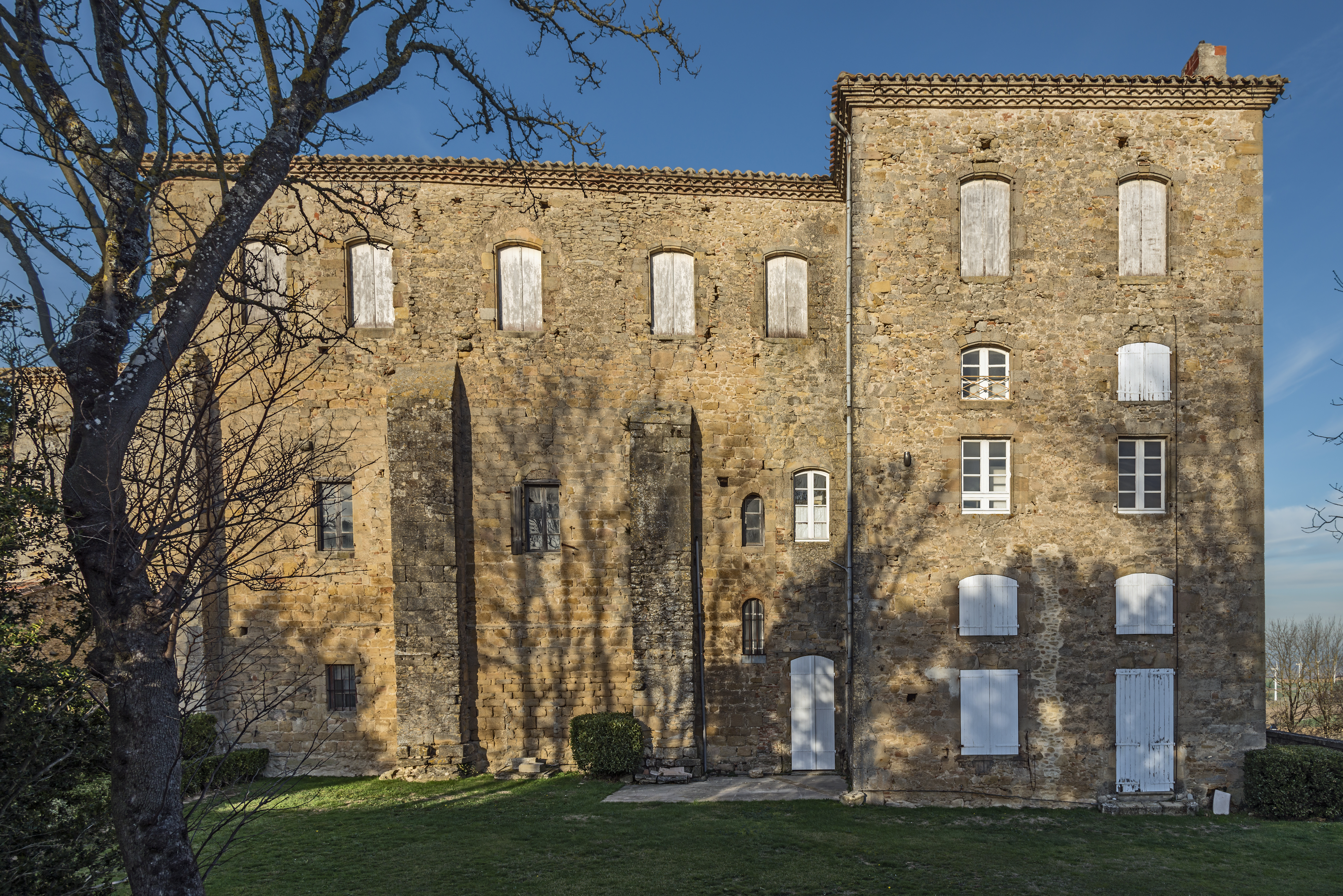
The castle

== See also ==
- Communes of the Haute-Garonne department
