= Nicetas (Bogomil bishop) =

Nicetas, known only from Latin sources who call him papa Nicetas, is said to have been the Bogomil bishop of Constantinople. In the 1160s he went to Lombardy. His purpose was apparently to reinforce the dualist beliefs of the Cathars of these regions, and, in particular, to throw doubt on the validity of their spiritual lineage or ordo, the sequence of consolamenta by which they were linked to the Apostles.

Mark, who then presided over the Cathars of Lombardy, belonged to the ordo of Bulgaria, which Nicetas impugned. Like original Bogomilism, was a moderate or monarchian dualist, believing in the inferiority of the "bad" or evil principle. Mark received consolamentum afresh from Nicetas, an absolute dualist who belonged to the ordo of Drugunthia or Dragovitia (in the southeastern Balkans), having received his consolamentum from bishop Simon of Dragovitia. Unlike Mark, Nicetas came from a late Bogomil current which believed both principles were coeternal and coeval, more similar to Catharism.

Nicetas then went on to Languedoc. In 1167 in the presence of Mark and other representatives of Cathar churches in Languedoc, France and Catalonia, Nicetas presided over the Council of Saint-Félix at which he renewed the consolamenta and confirmed the episcopal office of six Cathar bishops:

1. Robert d'Espernon, bishop of the French, i.e. of northern France
2. Sicard Cellarier, bishop of Albi
3. Mark, bishop of Lombardy, apparently synonymous with Italy
4. Bernard Raymond, bishop of Toulouse
5. Gerald Mercier, bishop of Carcassonne
6. Raymond de Casals, bishop of Agen

Nicetas instructed the assembly that, just as the Seven Churches of Asia did not interfere with one another's independence, neither did the modern bishoprics of the Bogomils, and nor must the bishoprics of the Cathars. For more on the document on which this report is based, see Council of Saint-Félix.

At some later date, perhaps in the early 1180s, a certain Petracius came to Italy, following in Nicetas's footsteps, and threw doubt on the moral behaviour of Simon of Dragovitia, thus invalidating the ordo of Nicetas and all those whose consolamenta Nicetas had given or renewed. This was disastrous for the Cathar church of Italy, which was plunged into lengthy schism.
