= Margherita von Stein =

Italian gallerist

- Born: 1921; Italy
- Died: 2003 (aged 81–82); Turin, Italy
- Occupation(s): Gallerist, Art Collector
- Years active: 1966–2003

Margherita von Stein (1921–2003) was an Italian gallerist and an art collector.

== Career ==
Margherita Stein opened the Christian Stein Gallery in 1966 in Turin, Italy in her apartment at via Teofilo Rossi 3 with an exhibition of Aldo Mondino. She used her husband's name (Christian) instead of her own, as a nom de plume to avoid any prejudices against her work as a woman. Mostly known for her early support for artists associated with Arte Povera, Stein's work fostered the careers of artists like Luciano Fabro, Jannis Kounellis, Francesco Lo Savio, Mario Merz, Giulio Paolini, Michelangelo Pistoletto, Giovanni Anselmo, Gilberto Zorio, Piero Gilardi, Pino Pascali, Giuseppe Penone and Marisa Merz and other important post-WWII artists like Piero Manzoni, Lucio Fontana, Ettore Colla and Mimmo Rotella.

In 1996 Stein closed her gallery in Turin and moved to Milan, where she opened a new space in Corso Monforte in 1985 and one in New York in collaboration with Barbara Gladstone called Stein Gladstone Gallery. The program of the gallery expanded to show more international artists, including Richard Serra, Gilbert & George, Jeff Wall, and Claes Oldenburg among others. Stein Gladstone closed in 1998 and Christian Stein continued to operate in Milan under the guidance of Gianfranco Benedetti.

== Legacy ==
Stein died in Turin in 2003. In 2010, an exhibition and catalogue titled Collezione Christian Stein: A History of Italian Art, was organised by Jean Louis Maubant and Francisco Jarauta Marión at the Museo Cantonale d'Arte in Lugano. In 2011, a digital exhibition with the same name highlighting some of the most significant works exhibited at the gallery was put on for the Italian newspaper La Repubblica. In 2017, a large exhibition celebrating her work was put on at the new arts organization Magazzino Italian Art in Cold Springs, NY titled Margherita Stein: Rebel With a Cause. The show was heralded with bringing a deeper knowledge of Arte Povera to the US. A large part of the collection of Margherita Stein was donated to the Castle of Rivoli Museum.
