= Bilderstreit =

Retrospective of modern art in Cologne in 1989

The art exhibition Bilderstreit – Widerspruch, Einheit und Fragment in der Kunst seit 1960 (Iconoclasm – appeal, unity and fragment in art since 1960) was a retrospective in the Rheinhallen in Cologne from 8 April 1989 to 28 June 1989 and was held by the Museum Ludwig shortly before the German reunification.

It was organized by Siegfried Gohr, Johannes Gachnang and Walter Nikkels and assisted by Cornelia Barth, Pier de Jonge, Kay Heymer and Nicola von Velsen. Christa Steinbüchel did conservatory work.

The advisory body consisted of Carmen Giménez (Ministry of Culture Madrid), Knud W. Jensen (Louisiana Museum of Modern Art, Humbleback) and Nicholas Serota (The Tate Gallery, London).

759 works were on view, consisting of over 2000 parts and created by 125 artists, two pairs of artists and anonymous creators of posters from Parisian May 1968.

== Artists and works ==
Works by Gerhard Altenbourg, Carl Andre, Giovanni Anselmo, Richard Artschwager, John Baldessari, Balthus, Georg Baselitz, Lothar Baumgarten, Bernd and Hilla Becher, Forrest Bess, Joseph Beuys, Ashley Bickerton, Louise Bourgeois, Georges Braque, George Brecht, Marcel Broodthaers, Günter Brus, Daniel Buren, James Lee Byars, Gaston Chaissac, John Chamberlain, Giorgio de Chirico, Francesco Clemente, William Copley, Walter Dahn, René Daniëls, Hanne Darboven, André Derain, Jan Dibbets, Jean Dubuffet, Marcel Duchamp, Marlene Dumas, Max Ernst, Luciano Fabro, Jean Fautrier, Helmut Federle, Robert Filliou, Eric Fischl, Dan Flavin, Günther Förg, Lucio Fontana, Otto Freundlich, Alberto Giacometti, Gilbert & George, Daan van Golden, Francis Gruber, Philip Guston, Raymond Hains, Georg Herold, Eva Hesse, Howard Hodgkin, Antonius Höckelmann, Jörg Immendorff, Alfred Jensen, Jasper Johns, Asger Jorn, Donald Judd, Axel Kasseböhmer, On Kawara, Ellsworth Kelly, Anselm Kiefer, Friedrich Kiesler, Per Kirkeby, Yves Klein, Pierre Klossowski, Imi Knoebel, Jannis Kounellis, Barbara Kruger, Eugène Le Roy, Sherrie Levine, Sol LeWitt, Roy Lichtenstein, Richard Long, Markus Lüpertz, René Magritte, Kazimir Malevich, Piero Manzoni, Brice Marden, Nicola de Maria, Agnes Martin, Allan McCollum, Mario Merz, Marisa Merz, Piet Mondrian, Richard Mortensen, Reinhard Mucha, Edvard Munch, Bruce Nauman, Ernst Wilhelm Nay, Barnett Newman, Hermann Nitsch, Albert Oehlen, Meret Oppenheim, Blinky Palermo, Giulio Paolini, Pino Pascali, A. R. Penck, Francis Picabia, Pablo Picasso, Sigmar Polke, Jackson Pollock, Richard Prince, Arnulf Rainer, Robert Rauschenberg, Man Ray, Gerhard Richter, Mimmo Rotella, Robert Ryman, David Salle, Julian Schnabel, Eugen Schönebeck, Kurt Schwitters, Cindy Sherman, David Smith, Louis Soutter, Frank Stella, Clyfford Still, Myron Stout, Niele Toroni, Rosemarie Trockel, Cy Twombly, Andreas Urteil, Hannah Villiger, Don van Vliet, Andy Warhol and Lawrence Weiner were on display.

=== Spatial structure ===
The rooms were organized in four areas:

1. Räume der Erinnerung (rooms of memory)
  Hommage à Jean Paulhan
  Duchamp – Picabia – Broodthaers – Beuys
2. I (1960s)
  Europa 1960 (Europe 1960)
  New York 1960
3. II (1970s)
  Figurative Malerei (Figurative Painting) – Minimal Art
  Abstrakte Malerei (Abstract Art) – Conceptual Art
  Italia – Germania
4. III (1980s)
  Bilanz einer Aktualität (outcome of topicality)
  Zitat, Fragment, Collage (quote, fragment, collage)
  Realität der Photographie (reality of photography)
  Peintres – Sculpteurs

== Lenders and sponsors ==
Sponsors were Deutsche Bank, Lufthansa, the KulturStiftung der Länder and Nordrhein-Westfalen-Stiftung (Foundation of Northrhine-Westfalia).

Apart from numerous named and unnamed private lenders many museums and institutions gave artworks. Among these were:

- Stedelijk Museum, Amsterdam
- Museum Ludwig, Cologne
- Bayerische Staatsgemäldesammlungen, Munich
- MoMA, New York
- Whitney Museum, New York
- Munch-museet, Oslo
- Staatsgalerie Stuttgart
- Museum moderner Kunst, Vienna
- Centre Georges Pompidou, Paris
- Museum Folkwang, Essen
- Tate Gallery, London
- Banque Hypothécaire du Canton de Genève, Geneva
- IHK, Cologne
- Deutsche Bank, Dresdner Bank
- Artists, on display
- Galleries

== Articles in the catalogue ==
=== Geleitwort (preamble) ===
The preamble by Hugo Borger starts with a quote from The Aesthetics of Resistance by Peter Weiss.

=== Bilderstreit (iconoclasm) ===
Hans Belting cites in Bilderstreit: ein Streit um die Moderne Jorge Luis Borges's The Duel: "Clara Glencairn entschied sich dafür, eine abstrakte Malerin zu sein." (El informe de Brodie, El duelo, "Clara Glencairn decided to become an abstract artist.")

Michael Compton discusses in Das Spiel der Stile – Duchamp und Picabia heute local differences and the role of America and Anti-Americanism.

Siegfried Gohr starts Über das Häßliche, das Entartete und den Schmutz with a contemplation about Picassos Les Demoiselles d'Avignon.

René Denizot mentions in Farbe Verbrechen the iconoclasm.

Per Kirkeby writes from a Danish point of view about visible and invisible Iconoclasm.

R. H. Fuchs speaks in Begegnung im Prado about artworks, that mirror each other.

Luciano Fabro finds in Die Kunst vor Gericht that the Autodafés started again in 1968.

=== Gegenstrebige Fügungen (reverse providences) ===
Nach dem Nihilismus by Wilfried Dickhoff begins with a quote from Rainald Goetz about the hermeneutic separation of the sayable.

Kay Heymers article Statement zu Chronologien stays under the motto Es gibt keinen Fortschritt mehr (There isn't any progress anymore, Harald Szeemann, 1984).

Piet de Jonge compares Die Welt und ihr Zusammenhang. On Kawara und Stanley Brouwn the 97 Piazza d'Italia-paintings.

Walter Seiter writes in Helmut Newton lesen about the protection of environment, landscape and the world as an aspect of modern pacifism.

Christiane Meyer-Thoss's Heaven can wait ... Konstruktionen für den freien Fall – Gedanken zu Werk und Person der amerikanischen Bildhauerin Louise Bourgeois und den Künstlerinnen Eva Hesse, Marisa Merz und Meret Oppenheim is motivated by Paul Celan's Kunst erweitern (Extend art, Der Meridian).

Dieter Schwarz apprehends in Über die Möglichkeit mehrerer Farbtuben a thought by Duchamp, that all images are supported Ready-mades.

The title of Antje von Graevenitz' Der Weg ist nicht zweigeteilt, sondern rund. Überlegungen zum Bilderstreit in (West-)Deutschland nach 1945 is inspired by Nietzsches Zarathustra.

Jole de Sanna writes in Das Bild und sein Gegensatz. Nach 1950 about intellectuals and the death of art.

=== Erlebniswege (ways of experience) ===
Haltestellen des Werdens – Eine biographische Ausstellungschronologie (1958–1974) by Rudolf Schmitz compiles texts by Johannes Gachnang, starting with a remark on wildness and Sturm und Drang.

Rudolf Schmitz motivates his Portrait des Ausstellungsmachers als Amateur d'art with Géricaults Le Radeau de la Méduse.

André Berne-Joffroy writes in Erinnerungen und Anmerkungen um die Paulhan-Ausstellung und ihren Katalog about Jean Paulhan (founder of the lettre francais and Cahiers de la Pléiade).

Emile Cioran starts Aus einem Interview mit Michael Jakob with a question by Jakob, that mentions Cioran's disbelief in dialogue and his belief that every meeting was a kind of cruxification.

=== Genius loci ===
Mathias Schreiber starts Bilderstreit im Raum: Köln als museales Zentrum with the bombardment of Cologne at the end of the Second World War, when the city only existed in pictures.

Georges Teyssot writes about museums and chooses the title Lichter und Schatten des Museums based on quotes by William Hazlitt (On Poetry in General) and Elisabeth Vigée-Lebrun (... des tableaux bien ou mal éclairés sont comme des pièces bien ou mal joués.).

Walter Nikkels writes in Räume statt Architektur – oder die Kunst in einer Ziehmonika about the Rheinhallen – denoted as Ziehharmonika squeezebox – where the exhibition took place.

Eduard Trier starts Max Ernsts >>Vater Rhein<< und seine Quellen with a report on the exhibition of the painting Vater Rhein in the gallery Der Spiegel opposite of the construction site of the Wallraf-Richartz-Museum.

In Apollinaire in Köln Reiner Speck talks about Les onze mille verges, where the pun verges – vierges and the number 11000 (Saint Ursula) reference Cologne in an encrypted way.

== Literature ==
- Bilderstreit Widerspruch Einheit Fragment, Siegfried Gohr, Johannes Gachang, DuMont Buchverlag Köln, 1989, ISBN 3-7701-2372-7
