= Magazzino Italian Art =

Coordinates: 41.4298°N 73.9149°W

Magazzino Italian Art is a museum and research center dedicated to postwar and contemporary Italian art, located in Cold Spring, New York. It opened in 2017 at the site of a former computer chip factory, from which it takes its name, which translates to "warehouse." While the museum was initially free to enter, it introduced admission fees in 2023.

The museum was founded by married art collectors Nancy Olnick and Giorgio Spanu, whose private collection of Arte Povera works form the museum's permanent collection. A second building, opened in 2023, features a gallery of Olnick and Spanau's Murano glass collection, a rotating exhibition space, a cafe, and a research library. The museum also has Sardinian donkey stables on the premises.

== Development ==
From 2003 to 2015, Olnick and Spanu ran a residency for contemporary Italian artists from their home in Garrison, New York. In 2012, they announced plans to construct a 16,000-square foot building on their property to house their collection, with additional space to house staff and visitors, although the facility would not be open to the public. The project faced significant local opposition from neighbors who objected to the facility's size and design, calling it a "monstrosity" that would clash with the area's rural character.

In response to the opposition, Olnick and Spanu moved the project to the Route 9 highway. The renovation of the main building was designed by Spanish architect Miguel Quismondo and yielded 18,000 square feet of exhibition space. The museum opened to the public on June 28, 2017, with Vittorio Calabrese appointed as the inaugural executive director.

In September 2023, the museum added the Robert Olnick Pavilion to its campus, a 13,000-square foot building designed by Quismondo and Alberto Campo Baeza and named after Olnick's father. The addition includes gallery space on the ground level and offices and storage in the basement. The focus of the building is an isotropic cubed gallery space.

== Exhibitions ==
Magazzino's first exhibition was dedicated to the influence and legacy of Margherita Stein, a late Italian dealer associated with artists active in Arte Povera circles and beyond, and the source of much of Olnick and Spanu's collection. The museum's permanent exhibition opened the following year and includes a rotating selection of works by Arte Povera artists including Jannis Kounellis, Luciano Fabro, Mario Merz, Marisa Merz, and Michelangelo Pistoletto.

The museum closed in March 2020 due to the COVID-19 pandemic, reopening in July 2020 with a new gallery whose first exhibition featured works created by Italian artists during the pandemic lockdown. Later exhibitions have featured work by conceptual artists Mel Bochner, Alighiero Boetti, and Lucio Fontana; sculptor Costantino Nivola; and visual artist Piero Gilardi.

The museum has also organized off-site exhibitions in the nearby town of Garrison, as well as in New York City, Washington, D.C., and Cagliari, Italy. In 2023, it curated an exhibition at the New York Valentino flagship store.

In 2026, the museum featured an exhibition of conceptual art by Piero Manzoni.
