= Giuseppe Penone =

Italian artist and sculptor

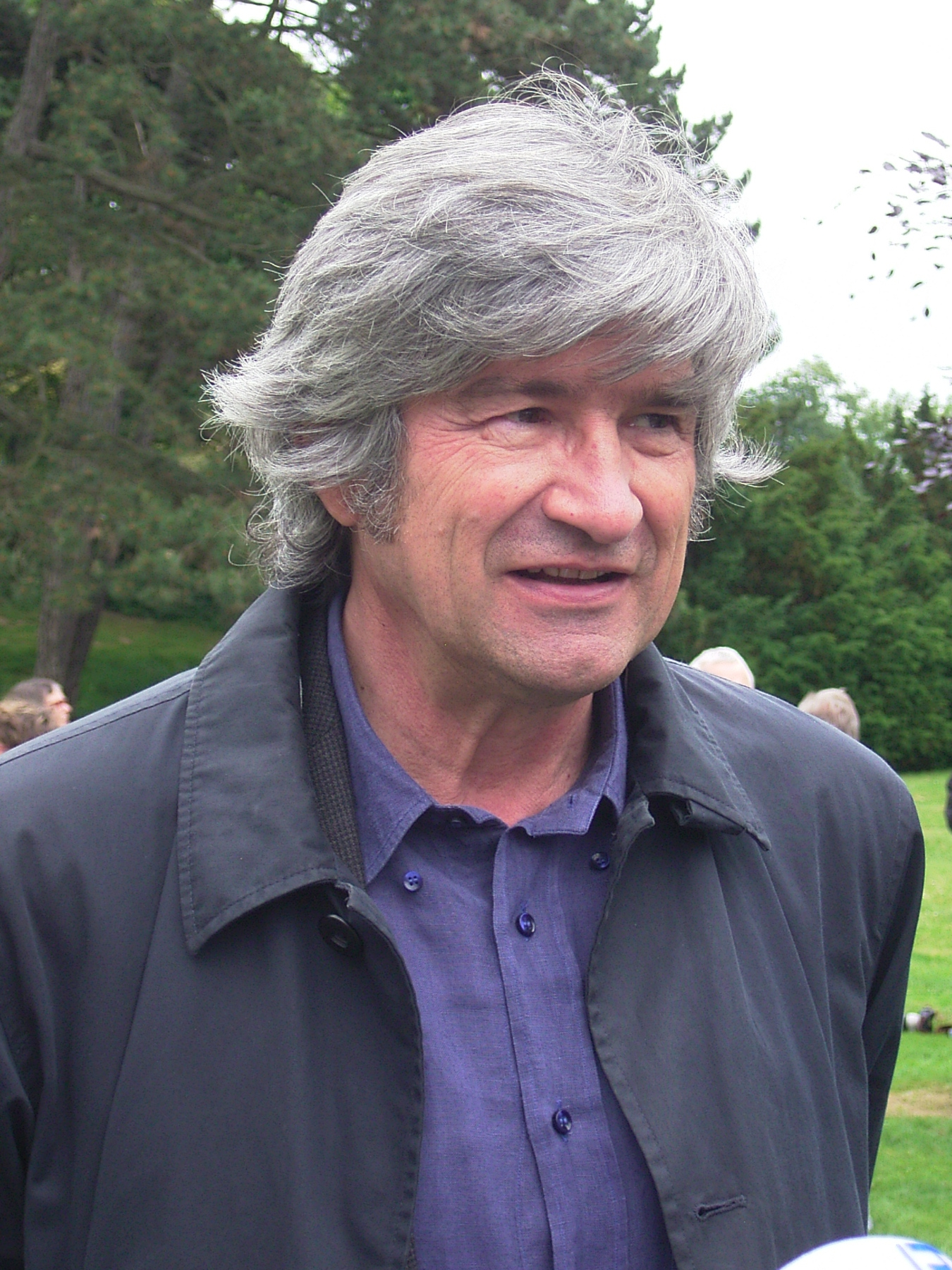
- Giuseppe Penone in 2010
- Born: April 3, 1947 (age 79); Garessio, Italy
- Known for: Sculpture
- Movement: Arte Povera
- Awards: Praemium Imperiale

Giuseppe Penone (born 3 April 1947, Garessio) is an Italian artist and sculptor, known for his large-scale sculptures of trees. He is interested in the link between man and the natural world. His early work is often associated with the Arte povera movement. In 2014, Penone was awarded the prestigious Praemium Imperiale award. He currently lives and works in Turin, Italy.

== Early life and education ==
Giuseppe Penone was born on April 3, 1947, in Garessio, Italy. In 1970, he studied in the Accademia Albertina in Turin, Italy.

== Works ==
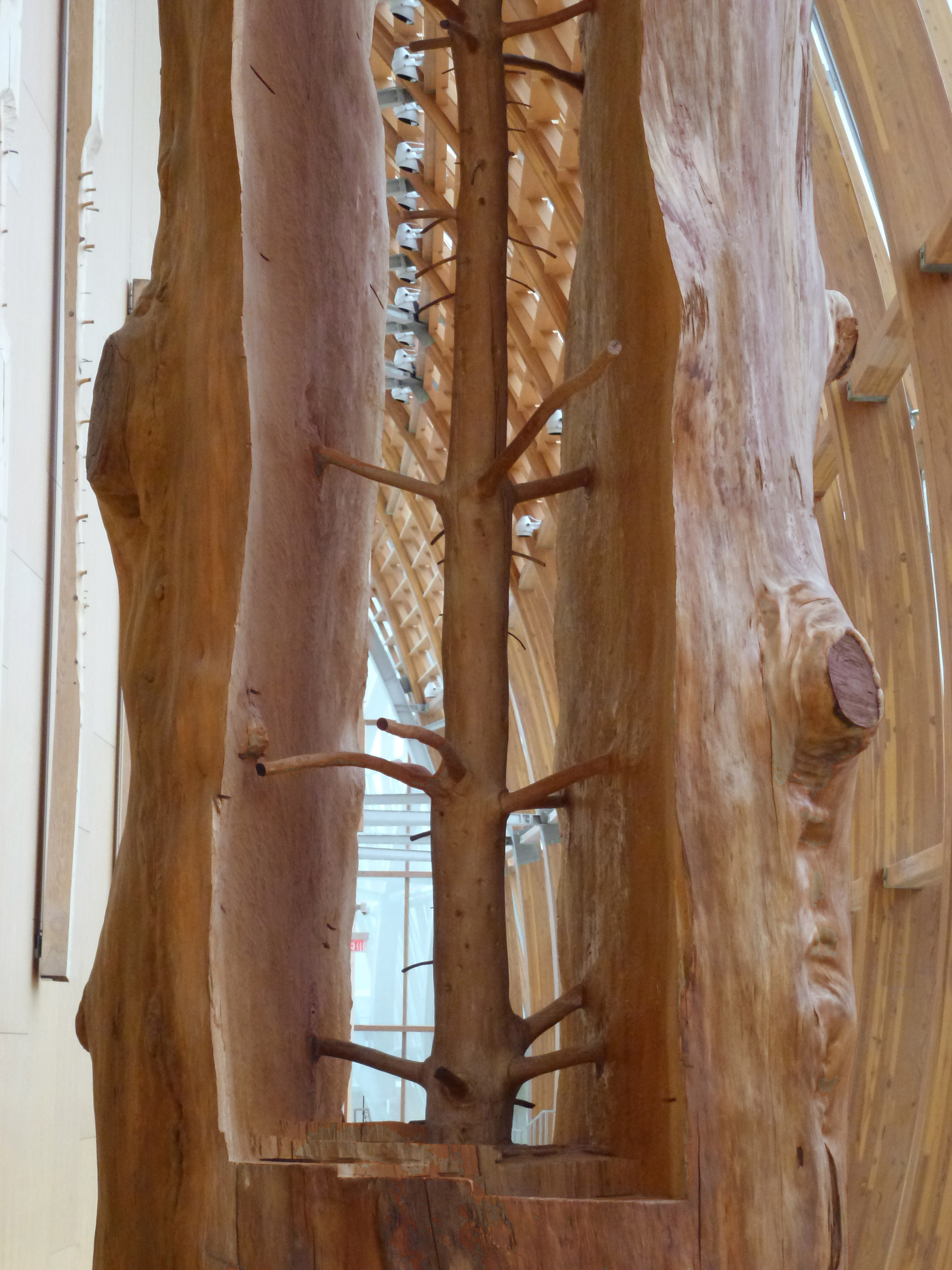
Penone's The Hidden Life Within

Penone's sculptures, installations, and drawings are distinguished by his emphasis on process and his use of natural materials, such as clay, stone, metal, and wood. His work strives to assimilate the natural word with his artistic practice, unifying art and nature. More specifically the tree, a living organism which closely resembles a human figure, is a recurring element in Penone's oeuvre. Penone created his first Albero ("Tree") sculpture in 1969, a series which continues to the present. Since this time, his practice has continued to explore and investigate the natural world and the poetic relationship between man and nature, artistic process and natural process.

=== Earliest works ===
In December 1968, Penone performed a series of acts in a wood near his home, the region of the Maritime Alps. In this work, titled Alpi Marittime, Penone intervened in the growth processes of a tree, whose form retained the memory of his gesture over time. One of his acts involved the flow of the waters in a stream, the vital sap which gives strength to the tree and on which the artist draws constantly in his work, a vehicle of growth and proliferation. He interlaced the stems of three saplings in Ho intrecciato tre alberi ("I Have Interwoven Three Trees") and uses nails to leave the imprint of his hand on the trunk of a tree and then affixed twenty-two pieces of lead to it, the number of his years, joining them up with zinc and copper wire: I miei anni collegati da un filo di rame ("My Years Linked by. a Copper wire). He enclosed the top of a tree in a net burdened by the weight of plants: Crescendo innalzerà la rete ("Growing It Will Raise The Net). He pressed his body to a tree and marked on the trunk the points of contact with barbed wire: L'albero ricorderà il contatto ("The Tree Will Remember the Contact").

In another of Penone's earliest experiments, Continuerà a crescere tranne che in quel punto ("It Will Continue to Grow Except at that Point") (1968), he inserted a steel cast of his hand in a tree trunk, forcing the tree to grow around his hand. He immersed in a stream a tub of cement with the dimensions of his body on which he had left the imprints of his hands, feet and face: La mia altezza, la lunghezza delle mie braccia, il mio spessore in un ruscello ("My Height, the Length of My Arms, My Breadth in a Stream").

In 1969, Penone's works were published in the Germano Celant's seminal publication Arte Povera in a form of a sort of diary correlated with drawing, photographs and brief notes. Six black-and-white photos, each of which documents a different action, were exhibited at a group exhibition in the gallery of Gian Enzo Sperone in Turin in May of the same year.

Other Penone works include: Pane alfabeto ("Bread Alphabet"), a large loaf of bread pecked by birds and thereby revealing the metal letters it contains; Scrive/legge/ricorda (Writes/Reads/Remembers), a steel wedge with the alphabet scored on it embedded in the trunk of a tree; Gli anni dell'albero più uno ("The Years of the Tree Plus One"); a bough covered with wax with, imprinted on it, the bark of the tree on one side and on the other the gestures of the artist; Alberi e pietre, I rami dell'albero più uno, Zona d'ombra ("Trees and Stones, The Boughs of the Tree Plus One, Shadow Zone") were all created between 1969 and 1971 in the forest of Garessio, where the artist assimilated his work to the behavior of other living things, for the most part, trees.

In 1969, Penone also produced the work titled Il suo essere nel ventiduesimo anno di età in un'ora fantastica ("His Being in the Twenty-Second Year of his Age in a Fantastic Hour"), which he created by uncovering within a wooden beam the tree as it was when it was his own age. The trunk and branches are only partially uncovered and reveal their natural origin while remaining partly incorporated in the geometrical structure of the beam. "Rise trees of the wood, of the forest" wrote the artist in a text of 1979, "rise trees of the orchards, of the avenues, of the gardens, of the parks, rise from the wood that you have formed, take us back to the memory of your lives, tell us about the events, the seasons, the contacts of your existence. Take us back to the woodland, the darkness, the shadow, the scent of the undergrowth, the wonder of the cathedral that is born in the wood land".

=== 1970s ===
In 1970, Penone created two sculptures, titled Albero di dodici metri ("Trees of Twelve Metres"), as performances during Aktionsraum 1 in Munich, Germany. For this work, Penone carved an existing tree down to a much smaller, more bare beam, and then created new branches so as to transport the tree back to an earlier period of its life. Another Albero di dodici metri, dating from 1980, was shaved out of a beam to its full height, with the exception of a part at the top of the plant that used to form the base of the sculpture. It was exhibited at the Solomon R. Guggenheim Museum of New York in 1982 and at the Musée des Beaux-Arts of Nantes in 1986. Other examples of trees, carved in different ways out of beams, make up the various installations titled Ripetere il bosco ("Repeating the Forest") at the Stedelijk Museum, Amsterdam, in 1980 and at the Castello di Rivoli Museo d'Arte Contemporanea in 1991. In his impressive sculpture Cedro di Versailles ("Cedar of Versailles") of 2004, the profile of the young tree is hewn in the trunk of an ancient cedar uprooted by the storm that wrought havoc in the Forest of Versailles in December 1999.

In Rovesciare i propri occhi ("Reversing One's Eyes"), an action of 1970, Penone wears mirror-finish contact lenses that interrupt the channel of visual information between the individual and his surroundings, entrusting to photography the possibility of seeing in the future the images that the eye should have collected. "The work of the poet," Penone wrote, "is to reflect like a mirror the visions that his sensibility has given him, to produce the sights, the images necessary to collective imaginings."

During this period, Penone carried out his work on traces and imprints obtained using various procedures, all based on contact. They range from the technique of the mold or cast to different actions based on exerting pressure. In Svolgere la propria pelle ("Developing One's Own Skin"), a 1970 artwork published the following year in the form of an artist's book, Penone recorded the boundary of his body with hundreds of photos taken by superimposing a sheet of glass on his skin. "The animal image, the imprint is involuntary culture. It has the intelligence of the material, a universal intelligence, an intelligence of the flesh of the material of man. The imprint of the whole epidermis of one's body, a leap into the air, a plunge into water, the body covered with earth. Developing one's skin against the air, water, earth, rock, walls, trees, dogs, handrails, windows, roads, hair, hats, handies, wings, doors, seats, stairs, clothes, books, eyes, sheep, mushrooms, grass, skin ... " wrote the artist, reflecting on the quantity of voluntary and involuntary signs that bodies disseminate and spread on different things: the neon lights in a gallery, the panes of glass in a window at the Kunsthalle in Kassel at "Documenta 5" in 1972, on a stone in Svolgere la propria pelle/pietra ("Developing One's Own Skin/Stone") of 1971, or on the fingers in Svolgere la propria pelle/dita ("Developing One's Own Skin/Finger") of the same year.

Penone's purpose is to produce the work starting from an image as automatic and unconscious as a fingerprint, and to make it conscious and voluntary through the irreplaceable action of drawing, which enlarges it and retraces it in all its art. Other examples are the cycles titled Pressione ("Pressure") begun in 1974 and Palpebre ("Eyelids") in 1977. The procedure adopted by the artist is articulated in different phases: making strips of adhesive tape adhere to his skin sprinkled with black, or pressure imprinting his own body or spreading a fine layer of resin on his eyelids and then photographing the image derived from the contact, projecting it enlarged onto paper or other surfaces, where it is transcribed in charcoal or pencil and with another act of contact, which the artist exerts by drawing. In some cases the work, which is the projection of the skin of an individual onto what is outside his body, takes on the dimension of an interior and the imprints traced on the walls of the space envelop the viewer, as in the installations he made for the exhibitions at the Kunstmuseum of Lucerne (1977), the Museum of Modern Art, New York (1981), The National Gallery of Canada in Ottawa (1983), or the Musée d'Art Moderne de la Ville in Paris (1984).

The connection between the act of contact and the process of memory became more prominent in Vaso ("Vase") of 1975. This consisted of a terracotta vase from an archeological excavation and an expansion, in four bronze sculptures, of the fingerprints left on it by the potter. Here, for the first time, Penone worked in bronze. In 1978, Penone began a series of works in clay titled Soffio ("Breath"). With these works, he reproduced the volume of the breath against his body in the form of a large clay vase, making visible a performative gesture of the artist. In 1979, he also produced Soffio di foglie ("Breath of Leaves"), in which the volume of the breath and the imprint of the body of the artist are impressed in a pile of leaves.

With his Patate ("Potatoes") of 1977, Penone inserted himself into organic forms. In this work, Penone grew potatoes inside moulds of his face, so as to make them appear like parts of his face, such as his ears and his nose. This process was repeated again with his Zucche ("Pumpkins") of 1978, which saw Penone create bronzes sculptures from casts of pumpkins grown inside facial casts. This work was shown for the first time at his solo exhibition at the Halle für Internationale Neue Kunst of Zürich in 1980, and is always accompanied by the sculpture Nero d' Africa ("Black of Africa"), a block on marble partially sculpted in the negative and positive form of the artist's own figure.

=== 1980s ===
In 1981, Penone began a series titled Essere Fiume ("Being the River"). For this series, Penone chose a rock from a river bed and then went to the source of the river to extract the same type of stone. The artist then painstakingly carved the stone to replicate the natural processes that have shaped the rock in the river, copying the ricochets and bumps as closely as possible. He then exhibits the two stones side by side. In mimicking the work done by natural agents on the rock, Penone highlights the similarities between the action of the river and the action of the sculptor, thus identifying himself with the river. He wrote: "Picking up a stone worn by the river, going back up the course of the river to discover the point in the hills from which the stone came and hewing a new block of stone from the mountain and then exactly replicating the stone picked up in the river in the new block of stone: this is to be a river. Producing a stone made of stone is perfect sculpture, a return to nature, it is a cosmic heritage, pure creation, the naturalness of a good sculpture acquires a cosmic value. Being a river is the true stone sculpture."

Some of Penone's works produced between 1979-1980 such as Albero d'acqua ("Tree of Water") and Colonna d'acqua ("Column of Water), all stem from the same logic of superimposing liquid on liquid vertically. "The condition of water is horizontality, the condition of verticality is sculpture, raising the water is a poetic gesture," he wrote in 1976. He sees all elements as fluid and what we would describe as hard or soft depends only on the state in which we find ourselves acting.

In Gesti vegetali ("Vegetation Gestures"), a series of sculptures which Penone began to work on in 1982, Penone "fossilized" the imprints of his hands on strips of clay stuck to a dummy that served as a frame. He then cast the clay in bronze using the lost-wax technique and completed the work by placing the casts next to each other so as to create the semblance of a human being. Gesti vegetali ("Vegetation Gestures") was first displayed in exhibitions at the Museum of Contemporary Art of Chicago and the Musée d'Art Moderne de la Ville de Paris in 1984. "Fossilized gestures that have been performed in a space," wrote the artist in 1977, "bring man closer to plants, which are compelled to live eternally under the burden of the gestures of their past." In his installation in Basel's Merian Park in 1984, he began to engraft vegetation onto his sculptures, as appears in his solo exhibition at the Marian Goodman Gallery in New York in 1985.

Penone has made bronze trees which have been erected in various public spaces. One example is the Pozzo di Münster ("Well of Münster") created for the 1987 edition Skulpture Projects; on its trunk was the imprint of a hand which gushed water. Others were the Faggio di Otterloo ("Beech of Otterloo") conceived for the outdoor sculptures park, the Rijksmuseum Kroller-Müller in 1988, the Albero delle vocali ("Vowel Tree"), a sculpture thirty meters long placed horizontally in the Tuileries in Paris, where it has been installed since 2000, or Elevazione ("Elevation") 01 2000-2001, a large tree raised off the ground in Rotterdam.

Many of Penone's works produced in the second hall of the 1980s are closely bound up with the idea of contact as a generator of memory and change. The series of works titled Verde del bosco ("Green of the Woods"), created between 1983 and 1987, are frottages on canvas of the trunks of forest trees, made using the leaves of the trees themselves. Sometimes the canvases are united in a single work with the trunks that produced them, or with Gesti vegetali ("Vegetation Gestures"), as in his installations in 1986 at the Museum of Grenoble in France and the Palais des Beaux-Arts in Charleroi.

Like hair, nails are an extension of the body, the part used to investigate or attack matter, but they also the part where the materials from contact tends to sediment. Starting in 1987, Penone created large glass sculpture in the lorm of nails and places them in contact with different materials, piles of leaves, forest trees, logs and blocks of marble. They were the theme of the 1998 exhibition at the Musée Rodin in Paris.

In the cycle of works titled Geologie ("Geologies") created starting from 1988, the earth sedimented in layers, as in its natural state, is enclosed in a transparent glass parallelepiped through which can be seen the imprint left by a gesture of the artist, the upheaval in the soil which preserves the image of the hand that caused it.

=== 1990s onwards ===
In the personal exhibition presented at the Église Courmelois at Val-De-Vesle in 1991, Penone displayed the large sculpture titled Suture ("Sutures"), which he worked on between 1987 and 1991. In it the enlarged negative of the image of a human brain is rendered by four jagged lines of steel that reproduce the points of contact between the four lobes, marking their boundaries and lines of contact with each other. A Y-shaped transparent glass tube containing soil constitutes the central element of the sculpture and raises the subject of the relationship between man and nature.

In the large drawings titled Foglie del cervello ("Leaves of the Brain"), the traces that a soft matter like the brain leaves on the skull are transposed to the images of leaves. In the Anatomie ("Anatomies"), shown for the first time at the Musée d'Art Contemporain in Nîmes in 1993, the artist hewed into the surface of Carrara marble (much favored for statuary) to bring out the veining, which so closely resembles the vessels through which blood flows in living creatures.

In the 1994 cycle of works titled Propagazione ("Propagation"), the concentric lines derived from the imprint of a finger expand into a system of waves. In Sorgente di cristallo ("Crystal Spring") of 1996, the glass cast in which the water seems to be crystallized, is taken from a casting of a trunk. Again in Albero delle vertebre ("Tree of Vertebrae"), presented for the first time in a traveling show at the museums of Nîmes, Tilburg and Trento between 1997 and 1998, the form of a tree trunk lives in the transparent material of crystal and it rises from forms in plaster created by enlarging the casts of a human skull.

Respirare l'ombra ("Breathing the Shadow") is a dimly lit room lined with laurel leaves, where visual and tactile impressions combine with olfactory sensations. In another installation, shown for the first time at the Galego Contemporary Art Center at Santiago de Compostela and then at the Palais des Papes in Avignon in 2000, in the centre of one of the walls there appears a gilt bronze lung, whose lobes are also modeled using laurel leaves.

In the bronze sculptures titled Pelle di foglie ("Skin of Leaves"), 2000, the leaves seem the endings of a system of nerves or veins evoked by the densely interlacing stems. In Spoglia d'oro su spine d'acacia - bocca ("Golden Skin on Acacia Thorns - Mounth") 2002, the imprint of lips is picked out in myriads of acacia thorns, so transforming the human trace into a natural landscape. At the same time it evokes the nerve endings of a mouth while, by contrast, stressing its sensitivity. The work forms part of a series made from acacia thorns applied to silk and sometimes associated with slabs of marble, whose veiningin relief is shown to match traces marked by the vegetation. An example is the work titled Pelle di marmo su spine d'acacia ("Marble Skin on Acacia Thorns"), exhibited in 2001 at the Musée d'Orsay of Paris and the Fujikawa Gallery in Osaka.

In Pelle di cedro ("Cedar Skin") of 2002 exhibited for the first time in the anthological exhibition of Penone's work by the Centre Georges Pompidou in Paris in 2004, an imprint of the bark of a tree is impressed on the cowhides tanned using traditional methods. The roughness of the bark transferred to the hides and displayed in negative resembles a pattern of veins, as in the Anatomie. Bark also underlies the casts that appear in Lo spazio della scultura ("The Space of Sculpture") an installation presented at the recent exposition at the Studio per l'Arte Contemporanea Tucci Russo at Torre Pellice and the Museum Kurhaus Kleve between 2006 and 2007.

"The structure of fluids is the same whatever the element. A watercourse, a growing tree and a pathway have similar forms" writes Penone of the work titled Albero giardino ("Tree Garden"), produced for a former railroad site in Turin in 2002. In this outdoor work, the human action, hence culture, is compared to the force of natural elements and expressed in the design of a path traced by the vegetation, whose outline represents the growth of a tree.

Between 2003 and 2007, Penone was involved in the production of a large scale installation of sculptures for the seventeenth-century Palazzo di Venaria in Piedmont. This work, titled Giardino delle sculture fluide "The Garden of Fluid Sculptures," includes fourteen sculptures made in bronze, wood, and marble and spread over several acres of the outdoor gardens. In 2007 Penone was also invited to the Venice Biennale where he set up an installation for the new opening of the Padiglione Italiano.

In 2011 Penone participated in the Art Gallery of Ontario "Galleria Italia," which included his work Repeating the Forest (2007–2008). With this work Penone had carefully removed rings of growth from a fir tree to reveal its former young shape hidden beneath decades of growth, and Cedro di Versailles (Versailles Cedar), 2000-2003. "Penone arrives at these forms by carving the tree trunk leaving the knots in place until they emerge as limbs, revealing the sapling within." Regarding this work, he stated "My artwork shows, with the language of sculpture, the essence of matter and tries to reveal with the work, the hidden life within."

In 2016, one of his large-scale installations, *Leaves of Light*, was among the first works to be included in the permanent collection of the Louvre Abu Dhabi (United Arab Emirates)

In 2022, Penone decided to donate a substantial collection of drawings to the Centre Pompidou in Paris and the Philadelphia Museum of Art: both institutions marked the occasion with two major solo exhibitions dedicated to the artist.

=== Penone in Arte Povera ===
Since 1969 Penone has been one of the leading representatives of Arte Povera, the critical theory coined by Germano Celant in 1967 and based on the work of a number of Italian artists, including Giovanni Anselmo, Alighiero Boetti, Luciano Fabro, Jannis Kounellis, Mario Merz, Marisa Merz, Giulio Paolini, Pino Pascali, Michelangelo Pistoletto and Gilberto Zorio. These artists rejected traditional artistic languages. The appearance of Penone in this group of artists coincided with the emergence in the critical elaborations of the "magical and wonder-arousing value of the natural elements". This was at a time when dialogue and debate with the coeval international avantgardes was becoming most intense, conducted through a series of group surveys in which Penone took part. These events included Konzeption-Conception at the Schloss Morsbroich in Leverkusen in 1969, conceptual art arte povera land art at the Galleria Civica d'Arte Moderna in Turin and Information at the Museum of Modern Art, New York, in 1970.

== Honours and awards ==
- 2001 of the Rolf Schock Prize, Visual Arts.
- 2014 Praemium Imperiale, Sculpture
- 2022 Foreign associate member of the Académie des Beaux-Arts, Institut de France, Paris
- 2023 Premio Feltrinelli per la scultura, Accademia Nazionale dei Lincei, Roma

== Bibliography ==
- Germano Celant, Arte Povera (Milan: Mazzotta, 1969)
- Jean-Christophe Ammann, ed., Giuseppe Penone ex. cat. (Lucerne: Kunstmuseum Luzern, 1977)
- Germano Celant, Giuseppe Penone ex. cat. (Essen: Museum Folkwang Essen, 1978)
- Jessica Bradley, Giuseppe Penone ex. cat. (Ottawa: National Gallery of Canada, 1984)
- Catalog of Giuseppe Penone Sculture du Linfa, Biennale di Venezia, 2007
- Daniela Lancioni, and Carlos Basualdo, Giuseppe Penone: The Inner Life of Forms (New York: Gagosian, 2018)
