= Mario Schifano =

Italian painter

Mario Schifano (20 September 1934, Khoms, Italian Libya – 26 January 1998, Rome, Italy) was an Italian painter and collagist of the Postmodern tradition. He also achieved some renown as a film-maker and rock musician.

Schifano had a relationship with Anita Pallenberg in 1963, and with Marianne Faithfull in 1969.

== Work ==
Schifano produced mixed media work that included enamel paint, wax crayons, gouache, collage, photographs, among other materials. frequently combining them in a single work. Numerous works were painted in enamel on paper that were later mounted on canvas panels.

In 2023, the exhibition, Mario Schifano: The Rise of the ’60s was presented by the Magazzino Italian Art museum in Cold Spring, New York. The exhibit included 80 works by Schifano that were produced between 1960 and the 1970s. Previously, Schifano and the poet Frank O'Hara collaborated on the exhibition of Words & Drawings.

== Art market ==
At a Sotheby's auction in 2022, Schifano's Modern time on enamel on canvas was sold for 2.302 million €.

== Partial filmography ==
- 1964 - Round Trip (16 mm, B&W)
- 1964 - Reflex (16 mm, B&W, 8')
- 1966/1967 - Pittore a Milano (16 mm, B&W)
- 1967 - Serata (16 mm, C)
- 1967 - Anna Carini in agosto vista dalle farfalle (16 mm, C)
- 1967 - Vietnam (16 mm, B&W, mute, 3')
- 1967 - Made in USA (16 mm, B&W, mute)
- 1967 - Silenzio (16 mm, B&W, mute)
- 1967 - Jean-Luc Cinema Godard (16 mm, B&W)
- 1967 - Ferreri (16 mm, B&W, mute, 6')
- 1967 - Carol+Bill (16 mm, B&W, 31 min)
- 1967 - Souvenir (16 mm, B&W, 11')
- 1967 - Film (16 mm, B&W, 15')
- 1967 - Anna (16 mm, B&W, mute, 12')
- 1967 - Fotografo (16 mm, B&W, mute, 3')
- 1967 - Schifano (16 mm, B&W, mute, 1')
- 1967 - Voce della foresta di plastica (16 mm)
- 1968 - Satellite (film 1968)|Satellite (35 mm, B&W e C, 82')
- 1969 - Umano non umano (35 mm e 16 mm, C, 95' - (Production: Mount Street Film)
- 1969 - Trapianto, consunzione, morte di Franco Brocani (35 mm e 16 mm, C and B&W, 120')
- 1970 - Paesaggi (Super 8 mm, C)
- 1985 - Sigla per "La Magnifica Ossessione" (Video, C, 2' - Production RAI)
- 1994 - Absolut Vodka (Video, C, 20' - Directed with Roberto Lucca Taroni)
