= Pier Paolo Calzolari =

Italian artist

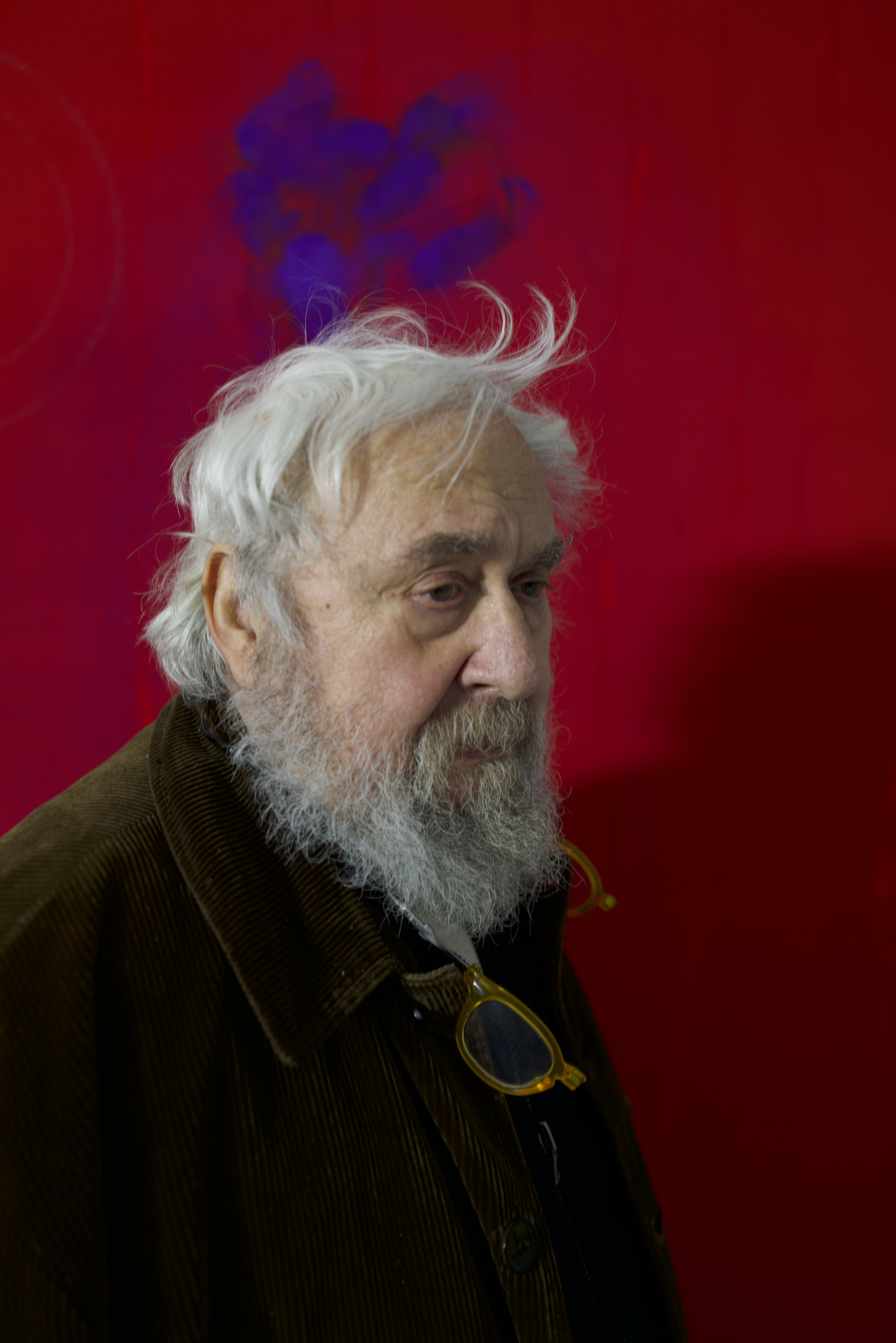
- Calzolari in 2025
- Born: 1943 (age 81–82); Bologna, Italy
- Known for: sculpture, installation
- Movement: Arte Povera

Pier Paolo Calzolari is an Italian artist (born 1943) who was originally associated with Arte Povera. He currently lives in Lisbon, Portugal.

== 1960s and 1970s ==
Calzolari spent most of his childhood in Venice, Italy, where the cultural Byzantine heritage and the singular light of the city over the water profoundly influenced his work. In 1965 he moved to Bologna where he set up his studio at Palazzo Bentivoglio. His first seminal pieces grew from his stay in the building where a lot of international artists were also invited to show their work, including the first film screenings on Italian soil of artists such as Ari Marcopoulos, Jonas Mekas and Andy Warhol. Between 1966 and 1967 Calzolari worked on his first performance piece entitled Il filtro e benvenuto all’angelo. (The filter and welcome to the angel)

Between 1968 and 1969, at the age 25, Calzolari worked in Urbino as an assistant professor at the Academy of Fine Arts. He was later promoted to professor in 2002–2003. In 1969, Calzolari also participated in the historical show "Live In Your Head: When Attitudes Become Form" curated by Harald Szeemann at the Kunsthalle Bern. The show marked the beginning of an international career. Szeemann would later invite him to exhibit at Documenta 5 in 1972.

== 1980s and 1990s ==
In the late 1980s, Calzolari retreated to Fossombrone, a small town in the Marche region of central Italy, where he has largely kept out of the public eye and worked in his studio. During the 1980s and 1990s, Calzolari participated in exhibitions at the Solomon R. Guggenheim Museum in New York (1994), MoMA PS1 in New York, and The Royal Academy of Arts. In the early 2000s Calzolari relocated to Lisbon.

== Present ==
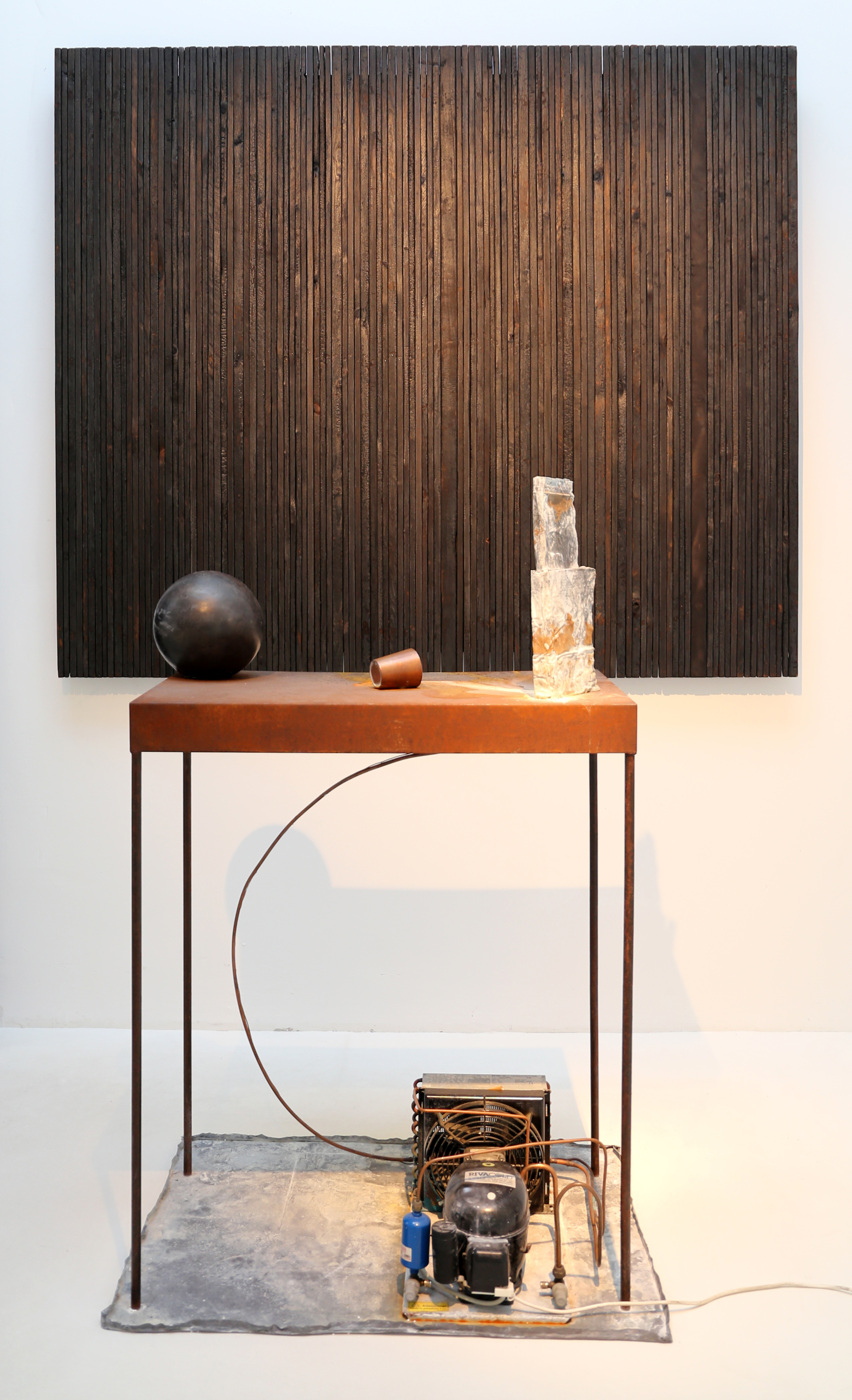
Pioggia 4, 2006

Today, Pier Paolo Calzolari is represented by Marianne Boesky Gallery, New York, and Kamel Mennour, Paris. In 2019 a retrospective of his work, titled "Painting as a Butterfly", was held at Museo d'Arte Contemporanea Donnaregina in Naples.
