= Giovanni Anselmo =

Italian artist (1934–2023)

Giovanni Anselmo (5 August 1934 – 18 December 2023) was an Italian artist who emerged after World War II within the art movement called Arte Povera. His most famous artwork is Untitled (Sculpture That Eats) (1968), a piece of art representing time and nature.

== Biography ==
After completing classical studies, he trained as a self-taught painter. He made his debut in 1967 as part of a group exhibition at Galleria Sperone in Turin with two untitled polymateric works. He participated, starting the following year, in the exhibitions of the Arte Povera group, led by critic Germano Celant, together with Michelangelo Pistoletto, Piero Gilardi, and Gilberto Zorio. In 1968 he held his first solo exhibition at Galleria Sperone and at the same time began to present some of his works at international events, such as the Bern exhibition When Attitudes Become Form in 1969. Anselmo took part in the Venice Biennale in 1978, 1980, and 1990, the year he won the Golden Lion for Painting. His work consists mainly of installations related to the concept of energy, which plays on balancing relationships between opposing thrusts.

He died in Turin on December 18, 2023, he was 89 years old.

== Arte Povera movement ==
Born on 5 August 1934, he participated in Arte Povera events starting in 1967, when he displayed his work in the context of the exhibition ConTempL'azione. This show was curated by Daniela Palazzoli in three galleries in Turin: Christian Stein, Sperone, and Il Punto.

=== Contemporary artists ===
Anselmo's work was and continues to be shown alongside that of numerous other artists mostly from the Arte Povera's pantheon, including, Getulio Alviani, Alighiero Boetti, Luciano Fabro, Mario Merz, Aldo Mondino, Ugo Nespolo, Giuseppe Penone, Gianni Piacentino, Michelangelo Pistoletto, Paolo Scheggi, Gianni Emilio Simonetti, and Gilberto Zorio.

== Death ==
Anselmo died on 18 December 2023, at the age of 89.

== Works ==
Anselmo's first solo exhibition was in 1968 at the Galleria Sperone in Milan. One of his works from 1971 is titled Invisible. Another from 1984 is titled senza titolo. Anselmo participated in the Venice Biennales of 1978, 1980 and 1990. He held solo exhibitions around the world after debuting in Milan. His exhibitions were held in the Renaissance Society, Chicago (1997), Palais des Beaux-Arts, Brussels (2002), Museum Kurhaus Kleve (2004), Stedelijk Museum, Gent (2005), and Kunstmuseum Winterthur (2013) and his work has been present in the permanent collection at Collezione Maramotti since 2007.
