= Guillem Ramos-Poquí =

Spanish painter (born 1944)

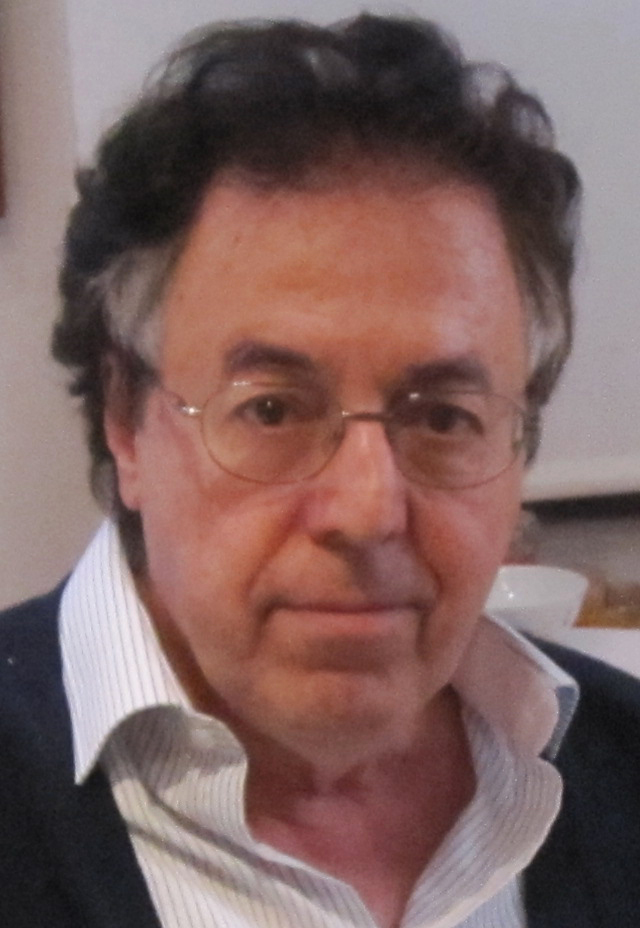
- Guillem Ramos-Poquí
- Born: 1944 (age 81–82); Barcelona, Spain
- Education: BA Hons Barcelona Faculty of Fine Art. P/G Ecole des Beaux Arts Paris. P/G Pratt Centre Printmaking New York. P/G Slade, University College London. MA Royal College of Art London. PhD Painting Barcelona Faculty of F.A.
- Occupations: Head of Fine Art Kensington and Chelsea College London (1990–2004). Lecturer in Advanced Painting Morley College London 2004–2013.
- Known for: Povera Art and Conceptual Art. Painting. Printmaking. Digital Art. Collages. Assemblages.
- Awards: French Government (Cercle Maillol) Fellowship to Paris (1965–66). American Elias Ahuja Art Specialist Fellowship to New York (1967–68). Member of the Royal Society of Arts.

Guillem Ramos-Poquí (born in 1944 at Barcelona) is a painter who was a major figure of Arte Povera and Conceptual art in Catalonia during the 1960s. He has lived in London since 1968.

== Studies and early career ==
Guillem Ramos-Poquí grew up in Barcelona where he studied painting at the city's School of Fine Art. During the 60s he was a major figure in the Catalan Conceptual art and Arte Povera avant-garde. After being awarded several art fellowships that took him to Paris and New York, he settled in London in 1968 where he studied at the Slade and the Royal College of Art. In 1995 he received his Ph.D. in Fine Art Painting from the University of Barcelona for his art work and thesis entitled The Conceptual Dimension in Art: Theory as an Inherent Component of the Practice of Painting, written in Catalan. He was Head of Fine Art at Kensington and Chelsea College (1990–2004) and Lecturer in Advanced Painting at Morley College (2004–2012). He has exhibited extensively in London and abroad.

== Post-Pop Art and Minimalism ==
In 1965 Ramos-Poquí was awarded a fellowship from the French Government to work in Paris and was given a studio at the Cité internationale des arts in Paris where he held an exhibition of collages featuring photo cut-outs, graffiti and letter/number transfers. Although these 1965 collages have a post-Pop Art feel, their employment of a personal code and incorporation of mechanical, automatic and lyrical formal elements defy categorisation. His 1967 work, exhibited in the Gallery of the Institute of North American Studies in Barcelona, consisted of a series of minimalist 'signs' made with industrial spray paint. Ramos-Poquí was granted the American Elias Ahuja Art Specialist Fellowship to New York, where he had a studio from 1967 to 1968.

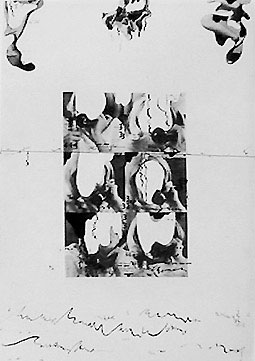
'Collage of the Telephone' on paper 1965

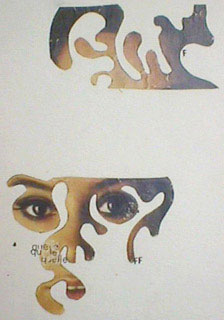
'Eyes' Collage on paper 1965

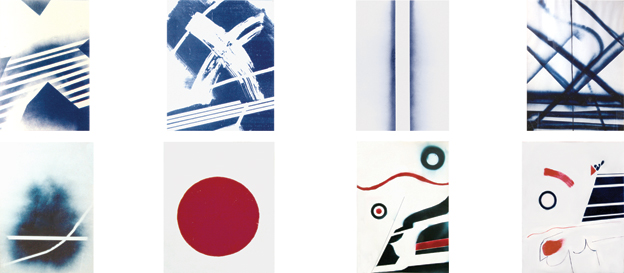
'Eight Signs'. 1967. Industrial spray on paper and canvas

== Arte Povera and Conceptual Art ==
Ramos-Poquí belongs to the generation of Catalan artists of the 1960s who emigrated to Paris, London and New York, including fellow artists such as es:Antoni Llena, who also spent time in London, Antoni Miralda, Benet Rossell and Jaume Xifra. Ramos-Poquí’s works from this decade include a series of collages juxtaposing dynamic forms with the use of industrial spray paint to allude to mechanical progress. During the 60s he also produced a series of ‘found objects’ belonging to the consumer market, with which he created assemblages. They reveal the impact of Pop Art and the works of Rauschenberg on his work. The small scale and poetic associations of many of these assemblages from the 60s echo the Surrealist objects by Joan Miró and the boxes by Joseph Cornell, as pointed out by the author Gerald L. Bruns and the art critic ca:Pilar Parcerisas i Colomer. Other assemblages are more explicitly linked to a spirit of revolt. In September 1968 he staged an exhibition and installation of his Arte Povera 'found objects' displayed in boxes and Conceptual Art pieces, consisting of 'photographs of ideas', at the Arts Lab in Drury Lane, London. Because of these works he is considered, according to Catalan Art Critic and Historian ca:Alexandre Cirici i Pellicer, the forerunner of Arte Povera and Conceptual Art in Catalonia.

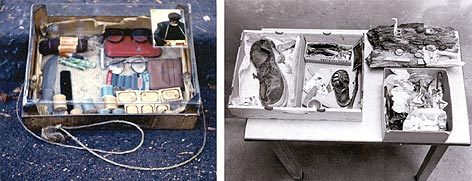
Beggar's Box,1968

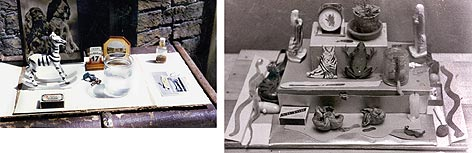
Boxes and assemblages, 1968

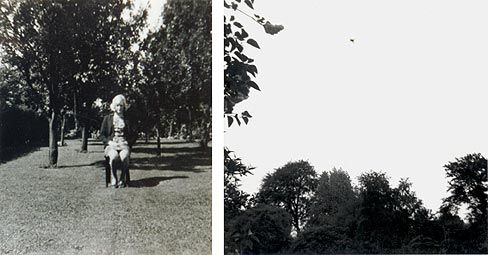
Photographs of ideas. Left: 'Girl in a Garden', 1968. Right: 'Aeroplane in a Garden' 1968

== Geometric colour field paintings ==
His colour field paintings show the influence of Rothko and North-American Post-painterly abstraction, especially Barnett Newman, Kenneth Noland and Frank Stella. He reached a post-Bauhaus geometric synthesis rooted in theories concerning visual perception, demonstrating an indebtedness to the geometry and colour of Johannes Itten, Rudolf Arnheim, and Josef Albers. In Paris he became acquainted with a Bauhaus pupil of Paul Klee, Mordecai Ardon, while in Chicago he met György Kepes who, together with Moholy-Nagy, founded the New Bauhaus (today the IIT Institute of Design in Illinois). Further encounters with Ola Okuniewska (Ola Wolpe) and Clement Greenberg also impacted his work. His passion for geometry continued throughout his career, right up until the present day. During the mid-70s he started teaching in London. His extensive knowledge of the techniques of painting led to him giving a series of demonstrations at the National Gallery and at several art colleges. In London he founded the Essendine Art Centre, where he taught advanced printmaking, life drawing and techniques of painting to young art college graduates. One of the specialized courses focused on 'The Technique of Icon Painting.' The success of the course led to the commission of a book on this subject, published by Search Press Ltd. It has been translated into seven languages.

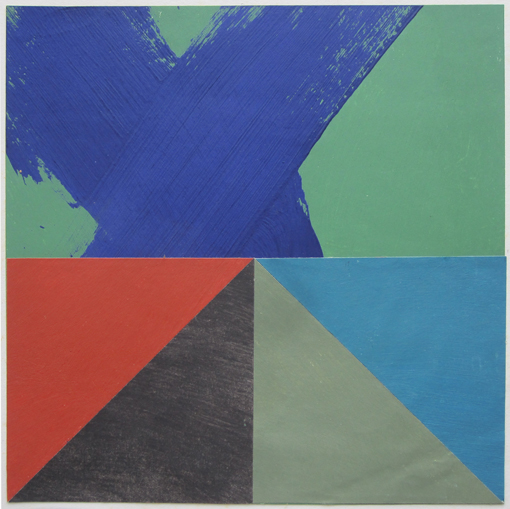
Painting, 'Geometric Interruption' oil on paper 1970

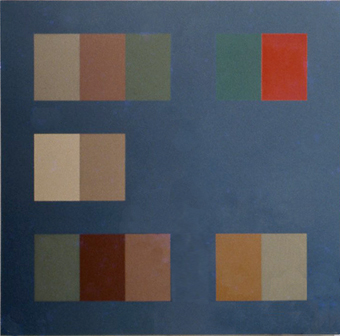
Painting, 'Leaves 2', oil on canvas 1 1/2m x 1 1/2 m, 1970

== Paintings, Digital Art and Assemblage (art) ==
Ramos-Poquí refers to his intimate works of the 1980s as ‘symbolic paintings' which were followed during the 90s by a series driven by urban inspiration known as ‘Satirical and Metaphysical Urban paintings’, executed while he was developing digital photomontages. Having already produced lithographs and etchings, it was during this period that he explored the possibilities of this new digital medium. His digital photomontages were exhibited in London. They were praised by art critics including es: José Corredor-Matheos and reviewed in many London papers. In 2001 he was commissioned to design the book covers for the Open University course 'Exploring Psychology.' His assemblages, of a satirical nature, were exhibited both in London and Belfast.

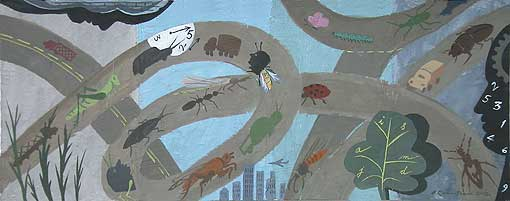
Insect Collector, 2002. Painting on panel

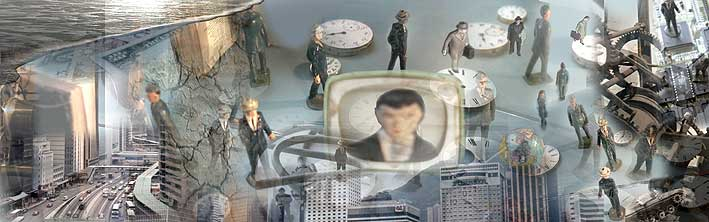
Orwell Prediction, 2003. Digital photomontage

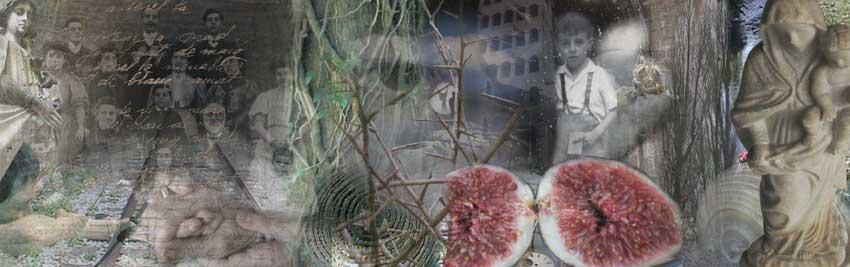
2003, Roots. Digital photomontage

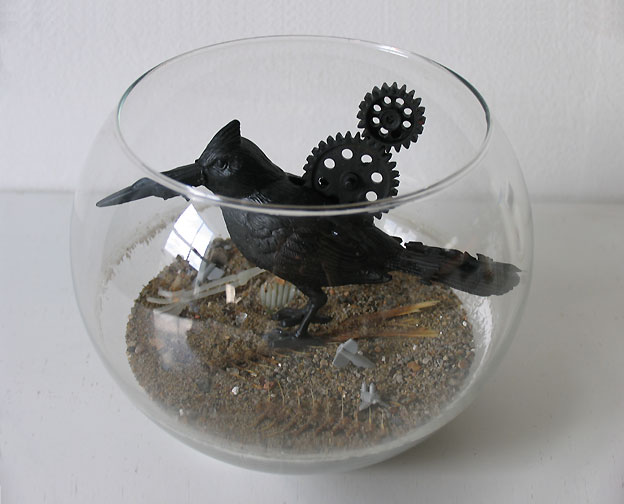

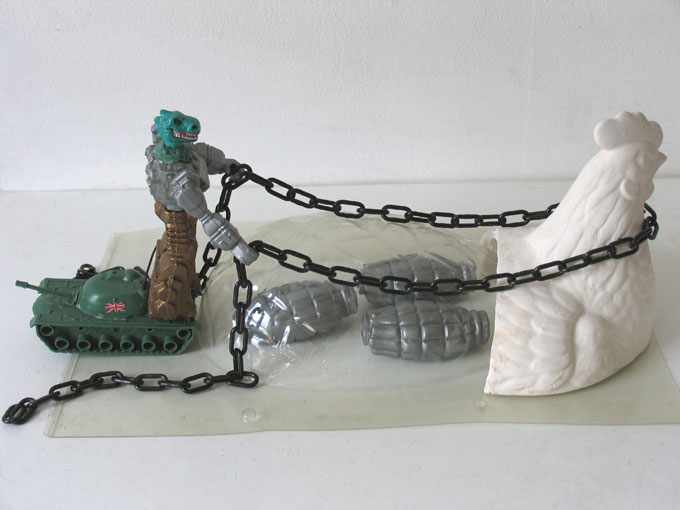

== Painting-collages ==
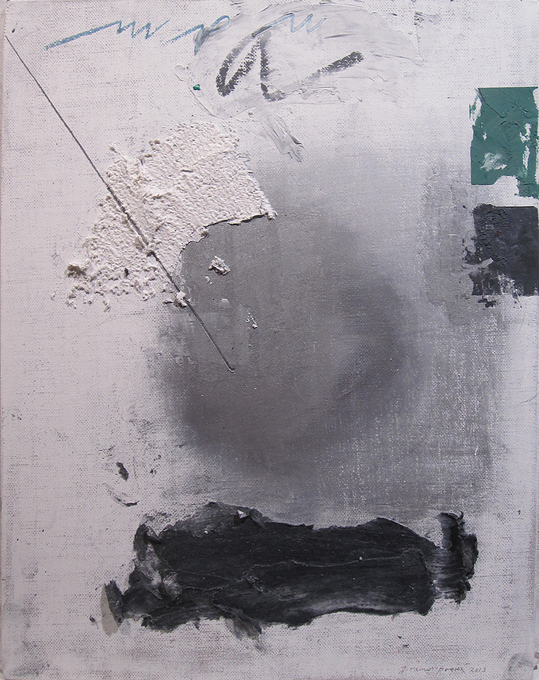
'Proposition a' 2013. Painting on canvas

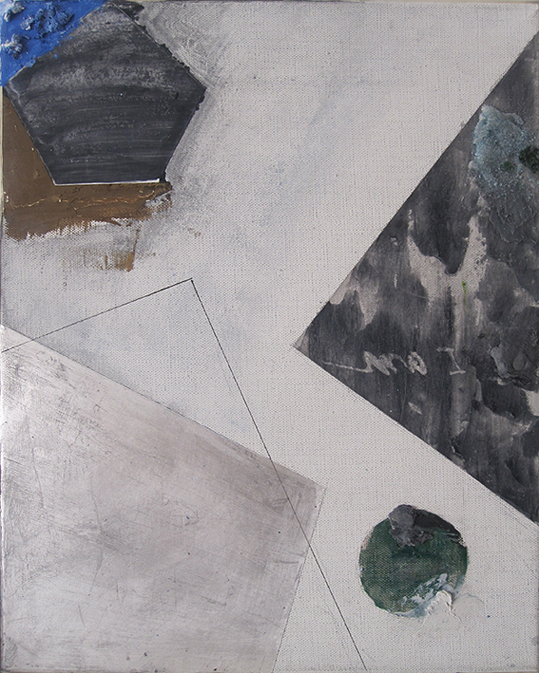
'The Confines of Freedom' 2013. Painting on canvas'.

His 2014 painting-collages were exhibited at the Royal Artistic Circle of Barcelona alongside some examples of his works from the 60s which he had exhibited in Paris in 1965 at the Cité internationale des arts. The art critic ca:Pilar Parcerisas i Colomer reviewed the show for El Temps and noted the works' unique approach to technique which incorporated egg tempera, sand, acrylic and objects from a mirror shard to a clock face. She also pointed out his references to works by the Old Masters, including Dürer's Melancholia.

== Mixed-media collages ==
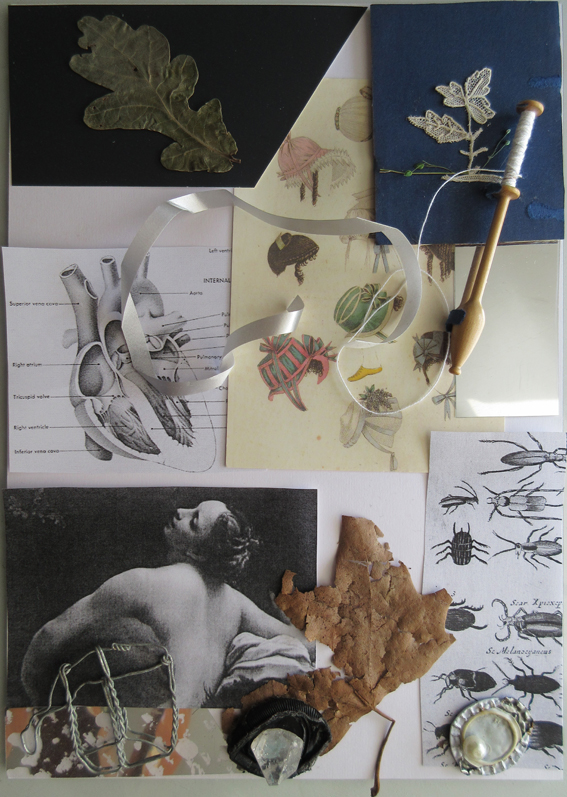
'Cloud' 2014, mixed-media collage on white card

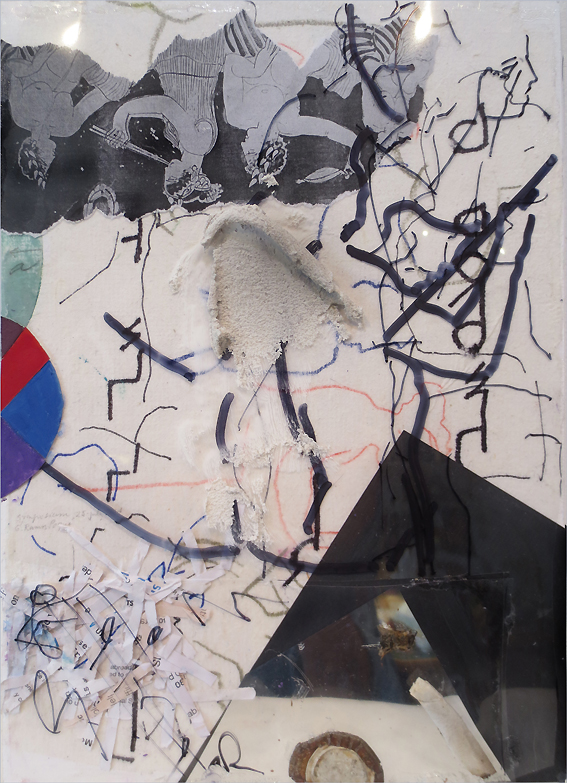
'Symposium' 2014, mixed-media collage on Japanese paper.

In his recent 2014 mixed-media collages 'found objects', text and fragments of reproductions by the old masters interact with the other elements of the composition. Found objects include dried flowers and leaves, insects, feathers, bottle tops and mirrors, broken clocks, pieces of embroidery, threaded paper, fragments of text or musical scores, and crystals. All of these elements possess intrinsic metaphorical values and, in terms of contrasts of textures, colours and formal transformations, relate to the artist's work as a painter as well as his early collages and assemblages. They affirm that the old masters remain an inspiration to contemporary artists today in their endeavour to interpret the world. A catalogue of these collages includes an introduction by Professor David Jasper, an expert in the field of Hermeneutics (University of Glasgow). He describes his mixed-media collages thus:

In the complex and riddling collages of Guillem Ramos-Poquí, we might glimpse a recovery of the art of memory as it is rooted in the sense of sight, and in its further verbalisations, a haunting presence of the divine in the midst of the contradictions and strange encounters in the world around us.

== Selected exhibitions ==
=== 1965–1970 (Collage, Mixed media, Arte Povera, Conceptual Art and Installations ===
- 1965: Paris: Cité internationale des arts, Paris (one-man show)
- 1965: Barcelona: Lleonart Gallery, Barcelona (one-man show)
- 1966: Paris: Galerie des Beaux Arts
- 1967: Barcelona: Institute of North American Studies, Barcelona
- 1967: Ibiza (Spain) Ivan Spencer Gallery
- 1967: New York: One Eleven Gallery
- 1968: New York: The Art of the East Village
- 1968: London: The Arts Lab, Drury Lane (one-man show)
- 1968: Cuenca: (Spain) Casa de la Cultura (Museum of Spanish Abstract Art)
- 1970: Essex: (England) Wansfell College Gardens, Epping, (one-man show)

=== 1971–1973: Geometric abstraction: Color Field paintings ===
- 1971: Barcelona: Aquitania Gallery, Barcelona (one-man show)
- 1971: London: Spanish Institute (one-man)
- 1972: Barcelona & Madrid: Institute of North American Studies (one-man show)
- 1973: London: Institute of Contemporary Art (I.C.A.)

=== 1981–1996: Paintings ===
- 1981: London: Camden Arts Centre
- 1982: Paris: Grand Palais
- 1982: Paris: Galerie des Beaux Arts
- 1984: London: Chenil Gallery (two one-man shows)
- 1985: London: Royal Horticultural Halls
- 1987: London: Blenheim Gallery (one-man show)
- 1987: Oxford: Oxford Central Library
- 1989: London: Englands & Co. Art Gallery
- 1989: London: Milne Moller Gallery. 1989: London: Tabernacle Gallery (Tabernacle, Notting Hill)
- 1991: London: Sweetwaters Art Gallery (one-man show)
- 1992: London: Tricycle Art Gallery (one-man show)
- 1994: London: Queen Elizabeth Hall, South Bank
- 1994: Barcelona: Salón del Tinell. 1996: London: The Mall Galleries (Federation of British Artists
- 1996: London: Eurofair'96, Royal Horticultural Halls (one-man show)

=== 1997–2004: Digital Art (Photomontages), Assemblages ===
- 1997: Brighton: University of Brighton Art Gallery
- 1997, 1998, 1999, 2000, 2001, 2002: London: Colville Place Gallery
- 1999: Barcelona: Caligrama Art Gallery (April – May)
- 2003, 2004: London: Deluxe Gallery, 2–4 Hoxton Square, London
- 2004: Belfast: Catalyst Arts Gallery Set-Oct (one-man show) Northern Ireland

=== 2007–2014: Painting, Painting-collages, Mixed-media Collages ===
- 2007, 2008: London: Bernard Chauchet Gallery, London SW10. (June and December collectives).
- 2008: London: Royal Academy Summer Exhibition
- 2008: Santander: Sala Nao
- 2008: London: Royal Overseas League Club (Open Door Exhibition) Piccadilly
- 2010: London: Morley Gallery
- 2011: Barcelona: Casa Elizalde Centro Cultural
- 2013: London: Tabernacle Gallery
- 2014: Barcelona: Reial Cercle Artistic de Barcelona

== Catalan bibliography ==
- Alexandre Cirici: 'La nova plàstica catalana: Abstracció significativa: Ramos-Poquí' Serra D'Or, maig 1968
- Alexandre Cirici: 'Nueva pintura catalana' text catàleg exposició, Casa de la Cultura Cuenca, abril 1968
- Alexandre Cirici: 'Ramos-Poquí el 1971' text catàleg expo.Institut d'estudis nord-Americans, Barcelona-Madrid,1972
- Alexandre Cirici: 'Objectes Pobres, objectes conceptuals: iniciadors'. Serra D'Or, febrer 1972.
- Alexandre Cirici: 'L'art català contemporani'. Edicions 62 Barcelona 1970, pp. 294, 296, 372.
- José Corredor Matheos: 'Història de l'art català Vol. IX (La segona meitat del segle XX)' Edicions 62, 1996, Precursors de del art Povera, manifestacions de lo efímer, els objectes de Ramos-Poquí, pp. 91–92
- José Corredor-Matheos: 'Guillem Ramos-Poquí. Collages, Paintings, Assemblages, Digital Photomontages: Paris Barcelona London-1965–2001 ('Foreword' del catàleg, 2001, publicat per la Colville Gallery de Londres).
- Laura Plana: 'Guillem Ramos-Poquí: Introducció i revisió cronològica de la obra: Obra retrospectiva 1965–2009 i Pintures recents 2010–2013' (catàleg digital) 2013

== Bibliography: Digital photomontages ==
- The Times Higher Education Supplement: Multimedia: 14 March 1997: Pages II-III
- "Digital print and the pursuit of a perfect image" by Guillem Ramos-Poquí (with 1 colour reproduction)
- CGI -Computer Generated Imaging Magazine (London N1 8DU UK): Vol 3 – Issue 1: January 1998. Page 16 "Environmentally friendly" (with 4 colour reproductions)
- CGI -Computer Generated Imaging Magazine (London N1 8DU UK): Vol 3 – Issue 2: January 1998. Page 8 "News: Gaze the Maze..." (with 1 colour reproduction)
- Computer Arts Magazine (Future Publishing, Bath BA1 2BW UK): Issue 17: April 1998. Page 108 Exposure: "Images from the Hermeneutical Maze" (with 4 colour reproductions)
- The Daily Telegraph Newspaper: Connected Colour Supplement (London UK): Thurs 30 April 1998. Pages 1,10-11 "Caught in the Gallery Door" by Paul Fisher (with 1 colour reproduction and 1 in b&w)
- Creative Technology Magazine (St John Patrick Publishers. London SE1 9AG): April 1998. Page 10 Folio (with 1 colour reproduction)
- Art Review Magazine (London EC1A 9LB UK): May 1998. Pages 58–61 "Computers...The Last Frontier. Part I" by Brian Ashbee (with 3 colour reproductions)
- Art Review Magazine (London EC1A 9LB UK): June 1998. Pages 48–49 "Computers...The Last Frontier. Part II" by Brian Ashbee (with 3 colour reproductions)
- The Times Higher Education Supplement: Digital: 27 November 1998. Page 11 "The Pixel Problem" by Claire Neesham
- The Times Higher Education Supplement: Digital: 8 October 1999. Page 14: "Beyond Words" (with one colour reproduction)
- SAGE Publications: Cover for "Social Work & Social Policy" catalogue. SAGE Publications, London 2000. (One colour reproduction of work from 1999).
- The Times Higher Education Supplement, 25 May 2001: Page 12: "Poetry in Motion" (1 colour reproduction)
- The Observer (Business/Cash Supplement), Sunday 27 January 2002. Pages: 12-13: "Pixels into pounds"/ "The Digital Masters" by John Windsor (1 colour reproduction across)
- The Irish News, Sat 2 Oct 2004, page 49. Exhibition Review at the Cathalyst Art Gallery, Belfast. By Aisling MCrea (1 colour reproduction)
- Artists in Britain Since 1945 (Vol 2: M to Z, pp 1312). David Buckman. Art Dictionaries Ltd, Bristol. 2006. ISBN 0 95326095X
- "The Paint Box Era": Artists in the Digital Art Museum, Berlin (DAM) www.dam.org
