= Gianni Piacentino =

Italian artist (born 1945)

- Born: 1945 (age 80–81); Coazze, Italy
- Known for: Sculpture; Painting; Installation Art
- Movement: Arte Povera; Minimalism
- Website: giannipiacentino.com

Gianni Piacentino (born 1945, Coazze, Province of Turin) is an Italian artist known for his sculpture and painting inspired by motorcycles, automobiles and planes.

== Life ==
Gianni Piacentino was born in Coazze in 1945. In 1965 he enrolled in the University of Turin where he studied philosophy until 1966. During his studies, he worked for a year as a disc jockey and worked part-time at a paint factory that produced special paints from 1967 – 1968. Following his break from the Arte Povera group in 1968, he purchased a 1930s Indian motorcycle that deepened a lifelong fascination, as well as an intimate knowledge of the vehicle. This captivation heavily influenced his work as an artist and eventually led to him participating in numerous motorcycle races, both as driver and sidecar passenger, between 1971 and 1977. He eventually resumed racing as a sidecar passenger and decorating racing sidecars in 2012.

Piacentino currently lives and works in Turin, Italy.

== Career ==
=== Arte Povera ===
Piacentino first exhibited with Arte Povera artists at Galleria Sperone, Turin in 1966 and then in Milan the following year. While involved with the Arte Povera movement in its infancy and cited as one of its founders, he abandoned it early on. It was during this brief period, 1965 to 1969, that Piacentino created his minimal sculptures as well as a series of acrylics on canvas which the painting "AMARILLIS" (1965) surmises well. "DARK DULL PINK LARGE X" (1966) is an example of the meticulously varnished, minimal objects he created while exhibiting with other Arte Povera artists.

This transformation solidified his differences with other Arte Povera artists, whose works have been described as "rough-hewn" to Piacentino's "ultra-refined" surfaces, and in 1969 Piacentino began his "Vehicles" and "Wings" series which would not be associated with the Arte Povera movement.

=== 1970s ===
The 1970s marked a shift in Piacentino's oeurve. The works he produced during this period were not unadorned pieces that have caused parallels to be drawn between him and West Coast American Minimalists, but works such as "MARBLED (PURPLE-BROWN) VEHICLE" (1969-1970).

The same attention to detail and refined surfaces that it is exampled in Piacentino's early works is still present in pieces such as "GRAY AND AMARANTH DECORATED AND INITIALED RECTANGULAR BAR" (1971), but with the incorporation of the artist's initials, "GP," into his work. This rectangular bar, which resembles to a decorative car bumper, is followed by an evolution of the same form transformed into flight inspired, "PINK-CREME PEARLESCENT SIGNED WALL WING" (1971).

This shift in Piacentino's work, away from pure minimalism while still maintaining a commitment to blemish-less surfaces, is in line with these words from Germano Celant:

"It is in this historical climate of oscillation between art and design, handcrafts and industry, the useful and the useless, the one-off piece and the mass-produced object, and between the autonomy and heteronomy of pure creation, that we can place the contribution of Piacentino, whose otherness and uniqueness lie precisely in the dialectic between the two poles, Pop and Minimal. Since 1966 his sculptures have been aiming for a result that transcends the functional object, even though the latter remains recognizable as a possible industrial product with decorative characteristics, as it is derived from a culture steeped in applied science, handicrafts and the precision of mechanics and sophisticated engineering processes."

Piacentino's work continued to evolve. 1972 to 1973 Piacentino created his first large canvas on the Wright Brothers, "WRIGHT BROTHERS G.P. (I): prospect with propellers on vertical" (1972-1973).

In June 1977 Piacentino participated in "Document 6". The pieces "MARBLED VEHICLE" (1969) and "GRAY FRAME VEHICLE WITH COPPER FRONT MARK I" (1971-1973) were shown alongside works by 655 participating artists in Kassel, Germany.

=== 1980s ===
Piacentino lived and worked in New York City from 1980 to 1981. Works he created during this period include "FLIGHT I - S.M. 55 - G.P. : front image on purple-gray vertical rectangle with side wings" and "G.P. FLIGHT TRIPTYCH : S.M. 55 profile and prospect on horizontal". In October 1981 Gesellschaft für Aktuelle Kunst e V., Bremen put on a solo exhibition of Piacentino's work. The show encompassed a range of Piacentino's work, from a minimal sculpture begun in 1966 to a painting completed in 1981.

Piacentino stated, in an interview with Isabella Puliafito in 1985, "Art has taught me to become a craftsman".

=== 1990s to present ===
In 1993, Piacentino participated in XLV Venice Biennale, Venice. In November 2015 Fondazione Prada hosted an extensive solo show of Piacentino's work. Curated by Germano Celant, it consisted of 90 works ranging from 1965-2015.

== Exhibitions ==
Piacentino's work has been displayed in the Fondazione Giuliani in Rome, Metropolitan Art Society in Beirut, the Museum of Contemporary Art Chicago (2009), MoMA PS1 in New York (1997), Centro de Arte Reina Sofía in Madrid (1990), the Gesellschaft für Aktuelle Kunst in Bremen (1981), the Nationalgalerie in Berlin (1978), the Palais des Beaux Arts in Brussels (1972), the University Museum in Sydney (1971), the Museum am Ostwall in Dortmund (1971), and the Fondazione Prada in Milan (2015).

Piacentino's work has also appeared at DOCUMENTA (6) in Kassel (1977), the XLV Venice Biennale (1993) and the Quadrennial in Rome (1973 and 2005). His work has also been collected by the Madre Napoli Museum.
