= Germano Celant =

Italian art critic (1940–2020)

Germano Celant (11 September 1940 – 29 April 2020) was an Italian art historian, critic, and curator who coined the term "Arte Povera" (poor art) in the 1967 Flash Art piece "Appunti Per Una Guerriglia" ("Notes on a guerrilla war"), which would become the manifesto for the Arte Povera artistic and political movement. He wrote many articles and books on the subject.

== Work ==
Germano Celant was born in Genoa, Italy. He attended the University of Genoa, where he studied history of art with Eugenio Battisti. In 1958 he joined Gruppo Studio, a collective formed by Luigi Tola and Rodolfo Vitone. In 1963, he worked as assistant editor for Marcatrè, a Genoa-based magazine about architecture, art, design, music and literature founded by Vitone, Eugenio Battisti, Paolo Portoghesi, Diego Carpitella, Maurizio Calvesi, Umberto Eco, Vittorio Gelmetti and Edoardo Sanguineti. In 1967, his manifesto of Arte Povera, Notes for a Guerilla War, was published in Flash Art. The concept of Arte Povera theorized that contemporary art in Italy was different from the one made in America due to the specific historical and socio-political circumstances. Italy was going through an industrial period but was not really making the pop art that coincided with the established economy as opposed to American artists like Warhol, Robert Rauschenberg, and other artists. Italian artists instead were going for a humanist approach in their work, favouring discarded materials.

"Arte Povera" was essentially formed around two nuclei: one in Turin, with artists such as Michelangelo Pistoletto, Mario Merz, Marisa Merz, Giuseppe Penone, Giulio Paolini, Giovanni Anselmo, and Piero Gilardi; and one in Rome, with Alighiero Boetti, Jannis Kounellis, Emilio Prini and Pino Pascali. Celant went on to organize Arte Povera exhibitions at Galleria La Bertesca in Genoa (1967), Galleria De' Foscherari in Bologna (1968), and a three-day performance event called "Arte Povera & Azioni Povere" in Amalfi (1968).

In 1974, Celant authored the first Catalogue Raisonné of Italian artist Piero Manzoni. The book would later be revised and expanded between 1997 and 2003 with the aid of the Manzoni Estate.

Celant curated many exhibitions on Italian art, including "Identité italienne: L'art en Italie depuis 1959" (Centre Georges Pompidou, Paris, 1981), "Italian art, 1900–1945" (Palazzo Grassi, Venice, 1989; with Pontus Hultén), and "Italian Metamorphosis 1943–1968" (Solomon R. Guggenheim Museum, New York, 1994). In 1997, he was the director of the Venice Biennale and in 2004, he curated the exhibition "Art and Architecture" in Genoa when the city was nominated as European Capital of Culture. From 1977, he was a contributing editor to Artforum and from 1991 he was a contributing editor to Interview.

In 1988, Celant was appointed Senior Curator of Contemporary Art at the Solomon R. Guggenheim Museum in New York City.

From 1993 on, Celant served as Artistic Director of the Prada Foundation in Milan, which began as PradaMilanoarte that year. Under his leadership, the foundation over the years presented shows of Walter de Maria, Louise Bourgeois, Anish Kapoor, David Smith, Michael Heizer, Sam Taylor-Wood, and Steve McQueen, among others, in Milan and Venice. In conjunction with the Venice Biennale 2009, Celant organized the second major survey of John Wesley, at the boarding-school buildings on the island of San Giorgio Maggiore, Venice. His 2012 show "The Small Utopia: Ars Multiplicata" at Ca' Corner della Regina, Venice, tackled the issue of art in the age of mechanical reproduction and how artists from Marcel Duchamp to Andy Warhol have used multiplication of various sorts. It contained over 600 items, produced between 1900 and 1975, and included design, ceramics, glassware, textiles, film, magazines, books, and sound recordings.

In 2012, Celant, in collaboration with the Fondazione Lucio Fontana, mounted the survey “Lucio Fontana: Ambienti Spaziali” at Gagosian Gallery, New York.

In 2016, he organised The Floating Piers project by Christo and Jeanne-Claude's work at Lago d'Iseo.

== Personal life ==
Celant was married to fellow curator Paris Murray. In 2006, the couple purchased a Milan paper factory building converted by the architect Pierluigi Cerri into a 10,000-square-foot house.

== Death ==
On 29 April 2020, Celant died in Milan from COVID-19 during the COVID-19 pandemic in Italy. He was 79.
