= Arte Povera =

Italian art movement

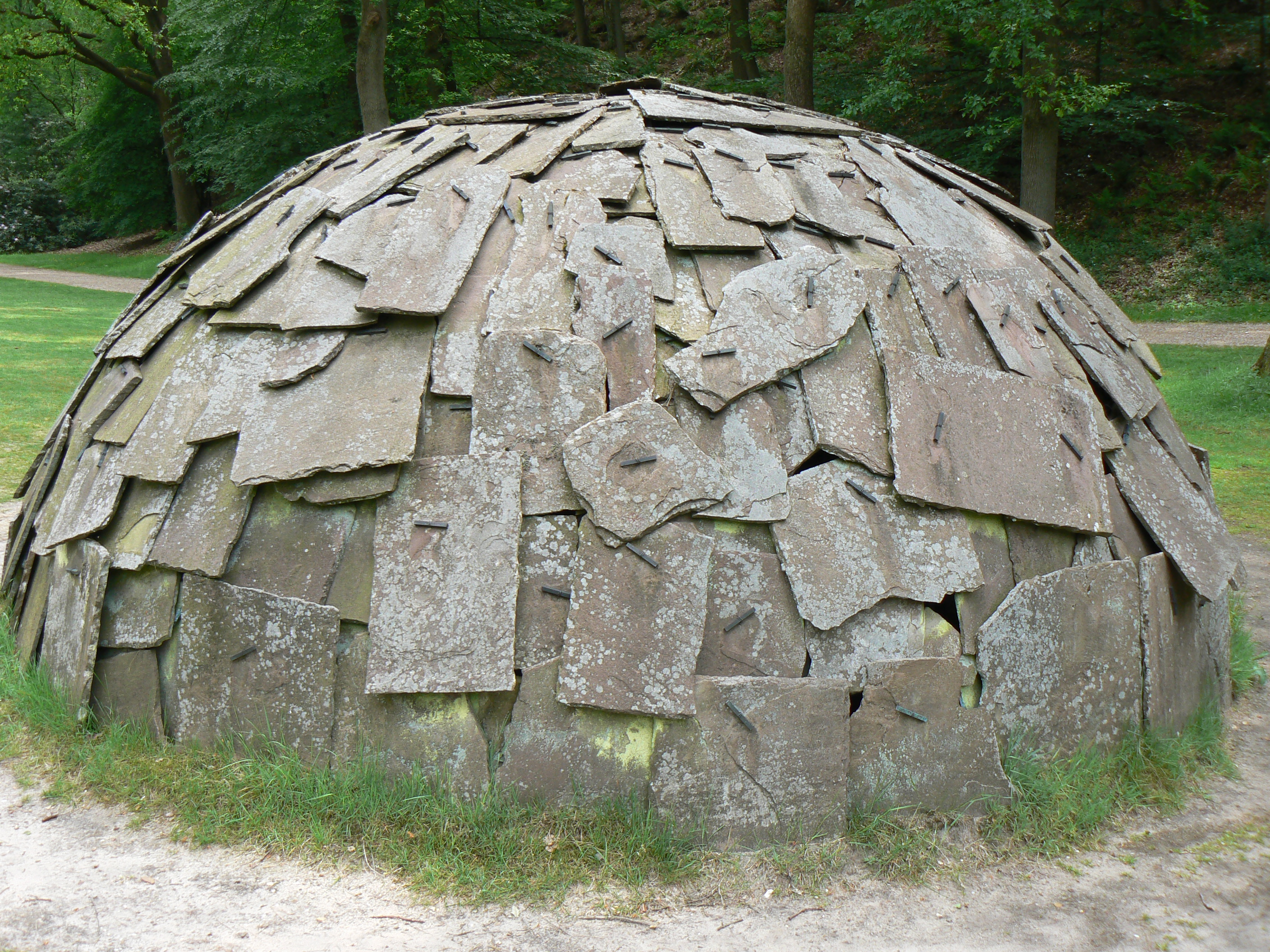
- Igloo by Mario Merz, an example of Arte Povera
- Years active: 1967–1980s
- Location: Italy
- Major figures: Jannis Kounellis, Mario Merz, Michelangelo Pistoletto

Arte Povera (Italian: [ˈarte ˈpɔːvera]; literally "poor art") was an art movement that took place from the end of the 1960s to the beginning of the 1970s in major cities throughout Italy and above all in Turin. Other cities where the movement was also important are Milan, Rome, Genoa, Venice, Naples and Bologna. The term was coined by Italian art critic Germano Celant in 1967, and introduced in Italy during the period of upheaval at the end of the 1960s, when artists were taking a radical stance. Artists began attacking the values of established institutions of government, industry, and culture.

Some of the first exhibitions of artists associated with Arte Povera were held at the Christian Stein Gallery in Turin, run by Margherita Stein. The exhibition "IM Spazio" (The Space of Thoughts), curated by Celant and held at the Galleria La Bertesca in Genoa from September to October 1967, is often considered to be the official starting point of Arte Povera. Celant, who became one of Arte Povera's major proponents, organized two exhibitions in 1967 and 1968, followed by an influential book published by Electa in 1985 called Arte Povera Storie e protagonisti/Arte Povera. Histories and Protagonists, promoting the notion of a revolutionary art free of convention, the power of structure, and the marketplace.

Although Celant attempted to encompass the radical elements of the entire international scene, the term primarily centered on a group of Italian artists who attacked the corporate mentality with an art of unconventional materials and style. Key figures closely associated with the movement are Giovanni Anselmo, Alighiero Boetti, Enrico Castellani, Pier Paolo Calzolari, Luciano Fabro, Jannis Kounellis, Mario Merz, Marisa Merz, Giulio Paolini, Pino Pascali, Giuseppe Penone, Michelangelo Pistoletto, Emilio Prini, and Gilberto Zorio. They often used found objects in their works. Other early exponents of radical change in the visual arts include proto Arte Povera artists: Antoni Tàpies and the Dau al Set movement, Alberto Burri, Piero Manzoni, and Lucio Fontana and Spatialism. Art dealer Ileana Sonnabend was a champion of the movement.

== Trends and concepts ==
- A return to simple objects and messages
- The body and behavior are art
- The everyday becomes meaningful
- Traces of nature and industry appear
- Dynamism and energy are embodied in the work
- Nature can be documented in its physical and chemical transformation
- Explore the notion of space and language
- Complex and symbolic signs lose meaning
- Ground Zero, no culture, no art system, Art = Life

=== Materials and techniques ===
Arte Povera artists made extensive use of everyday and "poor" materials, alongside industrial matter and organic or perishable substances. Processes such as gravity, chemical reactions, heat and cold, and environmental exposure were often integral to the work, allowing pieces to evolve, decay, or be renewed in situ.

==== Organic and perishable materials ====
Several works mobilised living or degradable materials to foreground duration and contingency. Giovanni Anselmo's Untitled (Sculpture That Eats) (1968) compresses a head of lettuce between granite blocks with copper wire; as the lettuce wilts, the balance changes and the piece must be "fed" anew. Jannis Kounellis introduced live animals and raw materials into the gallery, notably twelve live horses at Galleria L'Attico (Rome, 1969). Giuseppe Penone's practice centres on trees, growth, respiration, and bodily imprint, treating vegetal time as sculptural form.

==== Industrial and everyday materials ====
Artists also reworked industrial matter and quotidian objects, often in deliberately unrefined ways. Michelangelo Pistoletto's Mirror Paintings integrate polished steel supports that reflect viewers and surroundings, collapsing image and environment. Mario Merz developed igloos that combine metal armatures, glass, earth, or bags of clay soil with neon numbers or texts. Pier Paolo Calzolari employed refrigeration units, lead, salt, neon, and frost to stage states of matter and delicate thresholds of temperature.

==== Process and time ====
Many Arte Povera works were conceived as open processes rather than fixed forms, aligning with a broader turn to process-based and post-minimal practices at the end of the 1960s. Exhibitions such as Harald Szeemann's Live in Your Head: When Attitudes Become Form (Kunsthalle Bern, 1969) foregrounded works built, altered, or staged on site, privileging concepts, actions, and changeability over permanence.

===== Oxidation and patination =====
Within Arte Povera, oxidation—rust, verdigris, and related patinas—was used both as a visual index of time and as a material process incorporated into the work. Germano Celant described how artists such as Jannis Kounellis and Giovanni Anselmo foregrounded material change and "poor" matter to challenge industrial polish and permanence. Art historian Florence de Meredieu has analysed rust as both a bearer of memory and a transformative agent that confers individuality and historical resonance on materials. More broadly, critics associated oxidation and other natural processes with the post-minimal turn, in which materials were allowed to behave and alter over time.

==== Documentation and ephemerality ====
Because many works change or perish, exhibitions and publications frequently rely on photographic documentation, reconstructions, and artist instructions. Major surveys and catalogues such as Zero to Infinity: Arte Povera 1962–1972 contextualised these strategies within the movement's historical development and curatorial reception.

==== Selected examples (materials and processes) ====
- Giovanni Anselmo, Untitled (Sculpture That Eats), 1968 – granite, copper wire, lettuce (biological decay as structure).
- Jannis Kounellis, Untitled (12 Horses), 1969 – twelve live horses in a gallery (life processes within exhibition).
- Mario Merz, igloos, 1968– – metal armatures, glass, earth, neon (shelter and energy).
- Michelangelo Pistoletto, Mirror Paintings, 1962– – polished steel supports reflecting viewers and surroundings (image and environment).
- Pier Paolo Calzolari, works with frost, lead, salt, refrigeration, and neon (states of matter and thresholds).
- Giuseppe Penone, tree works and breath pieces – vegetal growth, bodily imprint, and environmental time.

== Artists ==
Michelangelo Pistoletto began painting on mirrors in 1962, connecting painting with the constantly changing realities in which the work finds itself. In the later 1960s he began bringing together rags with casts of omnipresent classical statuary of Italy to break down the hierarchies of "art" and common things. An art of impoverished materials is certainly one aspect of the definition of Arte Povera. In his 1967 Muretto di Stracci (Rag Wall), Pistoletto makes an exotic and opulent tapestry wrapping common bricks in discarded scraps of fabric.

Jannis Kounellis and Mario Merz attempted to make the experience of art more immediately real while also more closely connecting the individual to nature. In his (Untitled /Twelve Horses), Kounellis brings the real, natural life into the gallery setting, by showing twelve horses racked-up on the gallery walls. Recalling the Dada movement and Marcel Duchamp, his aim was to challenge what could be defined as art, but unlike Duchamp, maintains the objects real and alive, redefining the notion of life and art, while keeping both entities independent.

The 'reality effect' is not secondary but constitutive. (...) Kounellis shifts the frontier of what can be defined as art, but there is never the idea that art should be dissolved into life. On the contrary, art is given a new message as a rite of initiation through which to re-experience life.

Piero Gilardi, much like the aim of Arte Povera itself, was concerned with bridging the natural and the artificial. In his (Nature Carpets), 1965, which gained him recognition and assimilation into the Arte Povera movement, Gilardi built three-dimensional carpets out of polyurethane which used "natural" leaves, rocks, and soil as decoration, design and art meshed together to question societal sensibilities towards what is real and natural and how artificiality was being engrained into the contemporary commercialized world.

== List of artists ==
- Giovanni Anselmo
- Alighiero Boetti
- Alberto Burri
- Pier Paolo Calzolari
- Enrico Castellani
- Luciano Fabro
- Piero Gilardi
- Jannis Kounellis
- Piero Manzoni
- Mario Merz
- Marisa Merz
- Giulio Paolini
- Pino Pascali
- Giuseppe Penone
- Gianni Piacentino
- Michelangelo Pistoletto
- Emilio Prini
- Guillem Ramos-Poquí
- Gilberto Zorio

== See also ==
- Jerzy Grotowski
- Nnenna Okore
