= Aldo Mondino =

Italian artist (1938–2005)

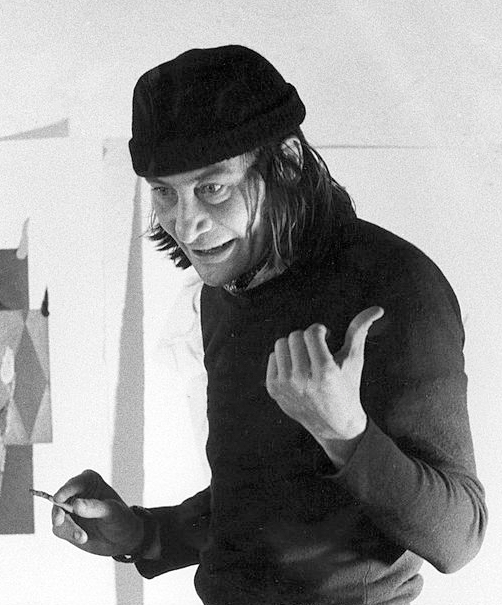
Aldo Mondino in his studio in Paris, 1975

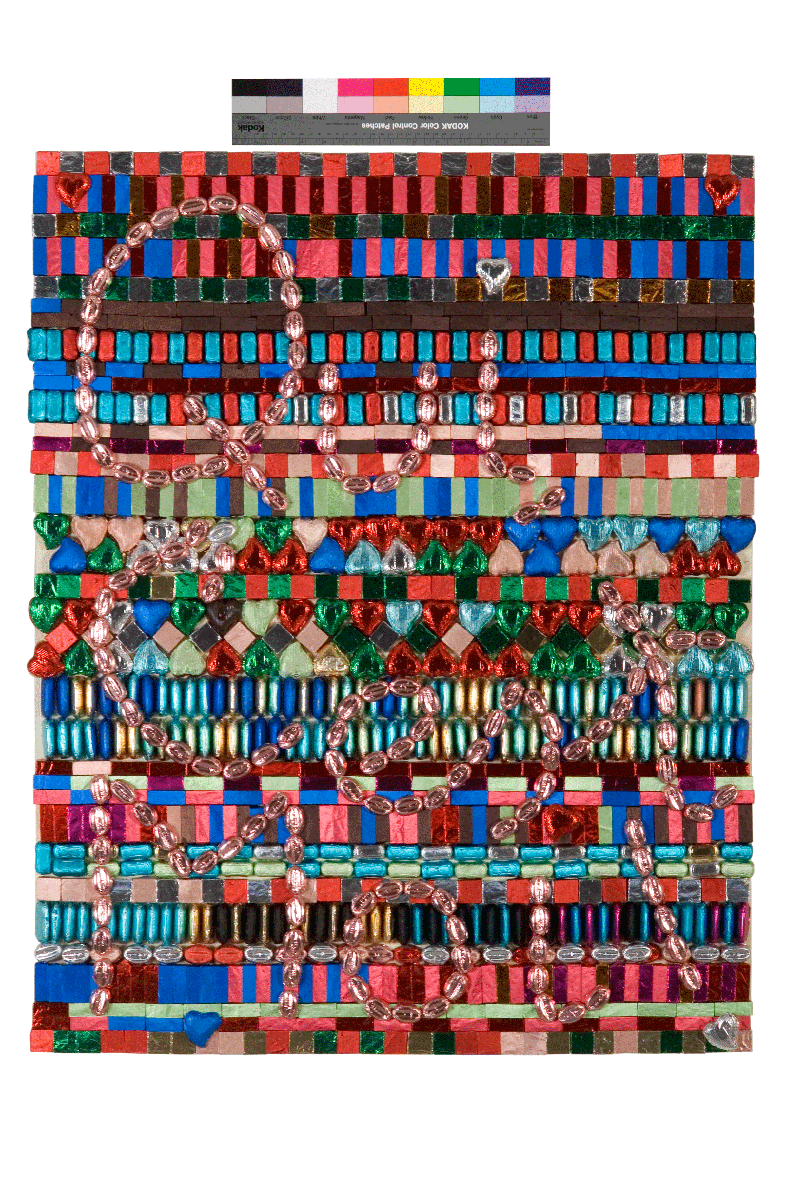
Aldo Mondino. Qui c'est moi. Chocolate mosaic. 1999. 100×82×4 cm

Aldo Mondino (Turin, 4 October 1938 – Turin, 10 March 2005) was an Italian sculptor and painter.

== Biography ==
Mondino was an artist characterized by an ironic approach to art. He used a range of unconventional materials in his works, including caramel and chocolate, and pioneered the art of painting on linoleum. He is known for mosaics realized using chocolate, seeds, coffee, legumes and many other different materials.

== Bibliography ==
- Angela Vettese, Aldo Mondino, Nuovi Strumenti, 1991
- Vittoria Cohen, Aldo Mondino, Particolare, Spazia, 1995
- Aldo Mondino, Progetto Siena, Prearo Editore, 1996
- Vittoria Cohen, Aldo Mondino dall'Acrilico allo Zucchero, Hopelfulmonster, 2000
- Maurizio Sciaccaluga, Risalto, 2001, Teograf
- Alberto Fiz, Aldo Mondino Il viaggio, Mazzotta, 2002
- Valerio Dehò, The passion for orchids, De Foscherari, 2004
- Valerio Dehò, Allegra con brio, Mazzotta, 2006
- Vittoria Cohen, MappaMondino, Damiani, 2007
- Marco Senaldi, MondoMondino, Damiani, 2007
- Alberto Fiz, Calpestar le uova, 2008, SilvanaEditoriale
- AA.VV. Cent lumières por Casale Monferrato, 2010, Skira
- Valerio Dehò, Aldo Mondino scultore, 2010, Allemandi & C.
