= Emilio Prini =

Italian artist (1943–2016)

- Born: c. 1943; Stresa, Italy
- Died: 1 September 2016; Rome, Italy
- Movement: Arte Povera

Emilio Prini (1943 in Stresa – 1 September 2016 in Rome) was an Italian artist associated with the Arte Povera movement that began in the 1960s.

== Biography ==
One of the early contributors to the Arte Povera movement living in Genoa in the 1960s, Prini became involved in shows such as "Arte povera – IM spazio" and "Collage 1" curated by Germano Celant, art critic credited with grouping the artists together.

== Works ==
In her book Arte Povera, Caroyln Christov-Bakargiev says that "Prini has created works based on the relationship between language and experience, exploring the meaning of intention, practice, reproduction, documentation and use through media such as photography and audio recording, written text and oral discourse." In his Perimetro series started in 1967, he places neon lights activated by sound at the ends and center of a room, leaving the viewer to activate the work and gain a heightened sense of the surroundings. Prini's "Camping [Amsterdam] approached the concept of a nomadic home which touched on Arte Povera's concerns on nature and culture. His concerns with the complexities of reality and perception left him to leave much of his works undocumented so that the art is experienced in the instant it is created, not in the reminiscence of stale objects.

== Exhibition ==
Fondazione Merz and Archivio Emilio Prini, opened in Turin an exhibition from October, 28th 2019 to February, 9th 2020 collecting over forty works by Emilio Prini. All exposed works have been made from 1966 to 2016 and offer a clear picture of his research on media including photography, writing, visual poetry and sound text.
