= Marisa Merz =

Italian artist and sculptor (1926–2019)

- Born: 23 May 1926; Turin, Italy
- Died: 20 July 2019 (aged 93); Turin, Italy
- Known for: Sculpture
- Movement: Arte Povera
- Awards: Biennale di Venezia Award for Lifetime Achievement

Marisa Merz (née Maria Luisa Truccato 23 May 1926 – 20 July 2019) was an Italian artist and sculptor. In the 1960s, Merz was the only female protagonist associated with the radical Arte povera movement. In 2013 she was awarded the Golden Lion for Lifetime Achievement at the Venice Biennale. She lived and worked in Turin, Italy.

== Early life ==
Marisa Merz was born in Turin, Italy, in 1926. Her father worked for Fiat Automobiles. She studied classical ballet and modelled for Felice Casorati for a period. In the 1950s she met the artist Mario Merz, who would later become her husband, who was studying in Turin. In 1960, they married and had a daughter, named Beatrice (Bea) Merz. The couple lived in Frutigen in the Alps for three years. Very little about Merz's early life, including her maiden name, is known publicly.

== Arte Povera and Career ==
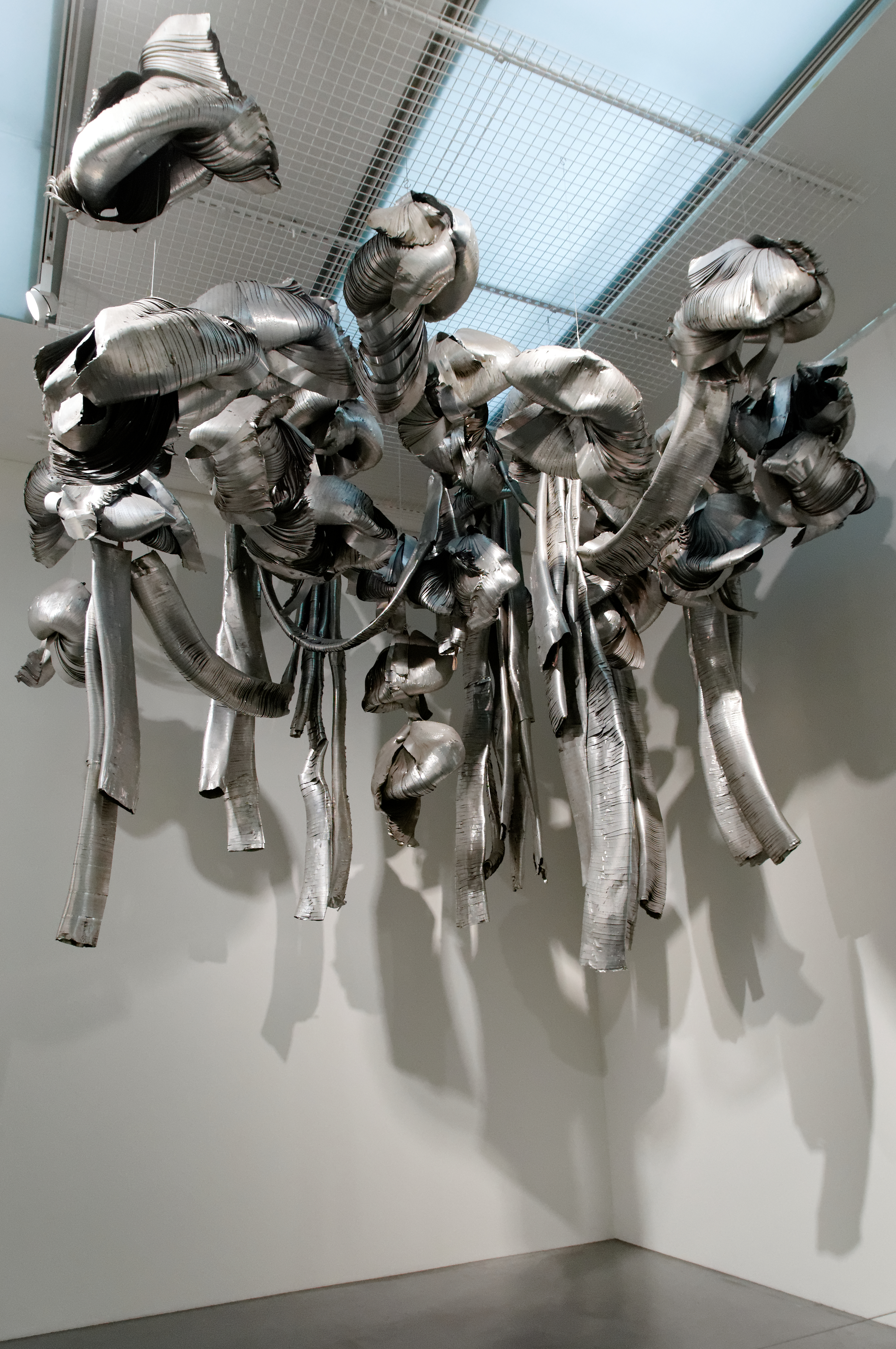
Untitled, 1966, Tate Modern

In June 1967, Merz had her first solo exhibition at the Gian Enzo Sperone Gallery in Turin, for which she made a folded aluminum foil installation. In December 1967, she had another show at the Piper Pluri Cub, a Turin disco that had opened the year before to host radical artistic events. In October 1968, she participated in the three day Arte Povera + Azione Povera event, curated by Germano Celant, in Amalfi. This Arte povera event, which also included the artists Michelangelo Pistoletto, Alighiero Boetti, Giovanni Anselmo, and Mario Merz, was radical for its avant-garde display of every day "poor" materials as art. Her work continued to reflect many of the fundamental issues with which Arte Povera artists are preoccupied, such as organic forms, subjectivity, the use of lower forms of art, including crafts, and the relationship between art and life. In 1969 she had a solo exhibition at the Attico Gallery in Rome. Her works took on an openly environmental character in a series of "rooms." Her husband Mario was supportive of her art and her career and would help her with her installations. In 1975 she also had a solo exhibition in Rome. This exhibition featured installations made by using knitted copper, under the title of Ad occhi chiusi gli occhi sono straordinariamente aperti ('To closed eyes, the eyes are extraordinarily open').

As a young artist, Merz did not receive widespread recognition, despite her huge contribution to the scene. Later, the growth of feminism brought her greater consideration. Marisa Merz's art has been described as lyrical, subtle, visionary, and private. Her installations feature the idea of the home as an intimate, private, and feminine space. An example is her 1966 installation Untitled (Living Sculpture), which was intended both for her home and to be presented in a gallery (she once said 'There has never been any division between my life and my work'). The installation consisted of thin strips of aluminium, clipped and suspended from the ceiling, forming coils and spirals. The work was acquired by Tate Modern in 2009. Her practice integrated aspects of craft and practices traditionally associated with women (e.g. knitting) and often employed mundane materials, such as copper, aluminum, waxed paper, and paraffin wax, which reflected her home environment. In this way, her art exemplifies that of the Arte Povera group, which collectively sought to "call into question—if not subvert—the high-gloss finish of fine art and its deadness as an institutional commodity." As an artist, Merz refused to formally name or date her works and claimed that art making operated "beyond time."

In her 1975 artist statement she talked about the absent divide between her life and her work that she created. By this time she had extracted herself from the art scene and practically locked herself in her studio to work. Therein she reflected on life with her daughter, Bea, while she was constructing her aluminum sculptures and how her daughter taught her so much in that time. In 1977, Merz had a solo exhibition at Galleria Salvatore Ala in Milan, Italy. After her husband's death in 2003, Merz left his studio untouched and continued to work into her 90s. In 2015, Beatrice Merz later opened a contemporary art center, the Fondazione Merz, in Turin.

She took part in documenta 7 in 1982 and documenta 9 in Kassel in 1992. She was also included in the Venice Biennale in 1988. In 1994, she had her first US show at Barbara Gladstone.

== Awards ==
In 2001, at the Venice Biennale, or Biennale di Venezia, Merz received the Special Jury Prize Award. At the 2013 Venice Biennale she was awarded the Golden Lion for Lifetime Achievement (also called the Leone d'Oro).

== Recent exhibitions ==
- Woven Histories: Textiles and Modern Abstraction, National Gallery of Art, Washington, DC / 2024
- The Shape of Time at Walker Art Center, Minneapolis MN / 2005–2009
- Italics, Italian Art between Tradition and Revolution, 1968–2008 at Palazzo Grassi, Francoi Pinault Foundation, Venice Italy / 2009–2010
- Marisa Merz at Gladstone Gallery, New York City / May – July 2010
- Arte Povera at Kunstmuseum Liechtenstein, Vaduz, Liechtenstein / 2010
- Marisa Merz at Gladstone Gallery, New York City / October – November 2010
- Marisa Merz at Gladstone Gallery, Brussels, Belgium / January – March 2011
- Group Show at Bernier Ellades, Athens, Greece / November 2011 – January 2012
- Marisa Merz: Draw draw draw redraw the image thought that walks at Foundation Merz, Turin, Italy / 2012
- Marisa Merz at Monica De Cardenas, Zuoz, St. Moritz, Switzerland / December 2012 – February 2013
- Marisa Merz at the Serpentine Gallery, London, UK / September 2013 – November 2013
- Marisa Merz: The Sky Is a Great Space at Met Breuer, New York City / 24 January – 7 May 2017, Hammer Museum, Los Angeles, CA / 4 June 2017 – 20 August 2017; catalog by Connie Butler ISBN 978-3-791-35567-2
- Marisa Merz at Bernier/Eliades, Athens, Greece / 13 December 2018 - 14 February 2019
- Marisa Merz at Philadelphia Museum of Art, Philadelphia, PA / Summer 2020

== Death ==
Merz died on 19 July 2019 at the age of 93.
