= Jannis Kounellis =

Greek-Italian artist (1936–2017)

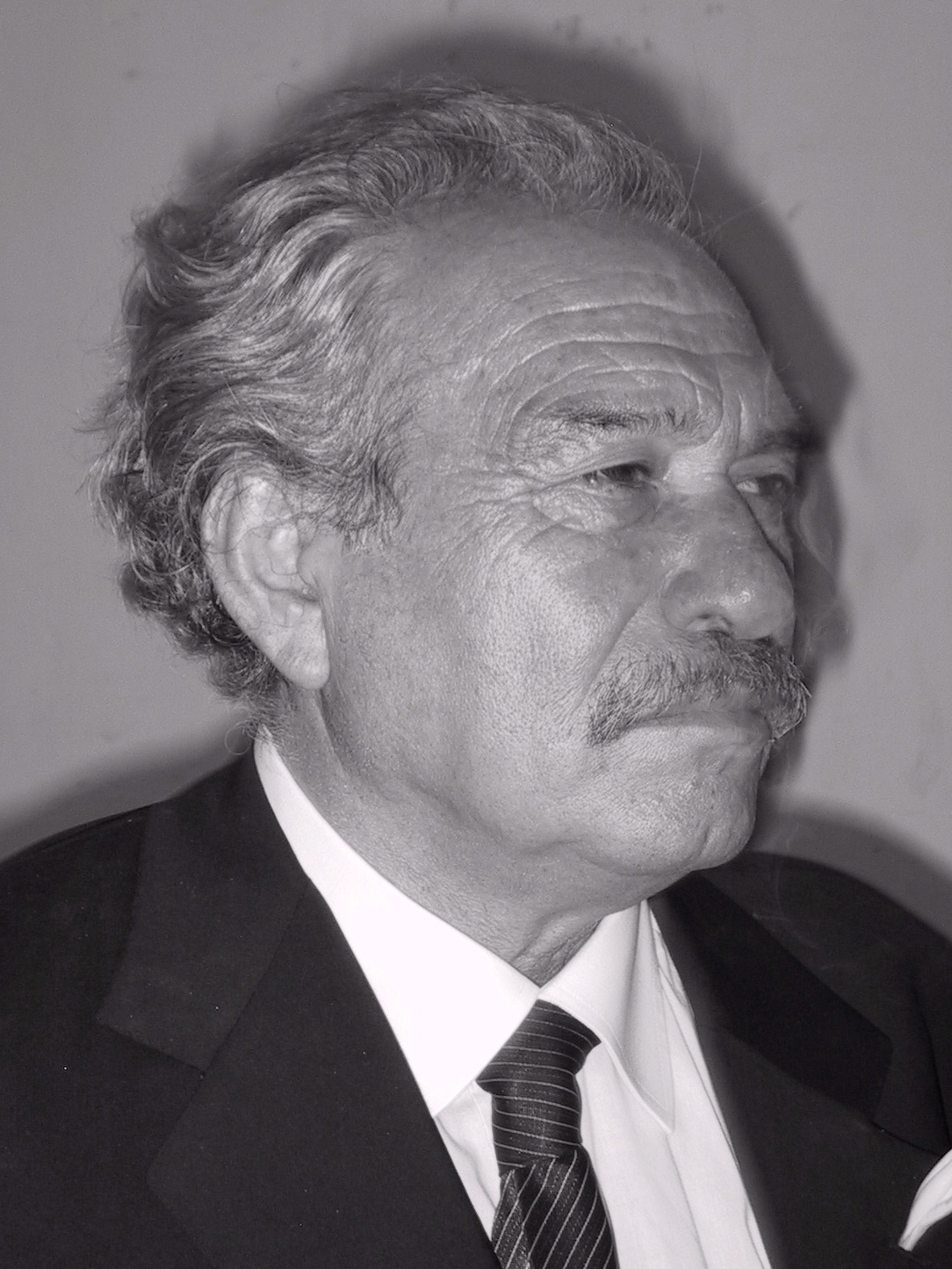
- Jannis Kounellis
- Born: 23 March 1936; Piraeus, Greece
- Died: 16 February 2017 (aged 80); Rome, Italy
- Movement: Arte Povera

Jannis Kounellis (Greek: Γιάννης Κουνέλλης; 23 March 1936 – 16 February 2017) was a Greek Italian artist based in Rome. A key figure associated with Arte Povera, he studied at the Accademia di Belle Arti in Rome.

== Life and work ==
Kounellis was born in Piraeus, Greece in 1936. He lived in Greece during the Second World War and Greek Civil War before he moved to Rome in 1956.

From 1960 to 1966, Kounellis went through a period of only exhibiting paintings. In some of his first exhibitions, Kounellis began stenciling numbers, letters, and words onto his canvases, often reflecting advertisements and signs seen on the street. In 1960 he began to introduce found sculptural objects such as actual street signs into his work, exhibiting at Galleria La Tartaruga. This same year he donned one of his stencil paintings as a garment and created a performance in his studio to demonstrate himself literally becoming one with his painting. This newfound convergence of painting, sculpture, and performance was Kounellis' way out of traditional art. By 1961 he began to paint on newspaper to reflect his feelings towards modern society and politics. From 1963, Kounellis introduced found objects in his artworks, among them live animals but also fire, earth, burlap sacks, and gold. He replaced the canvas with bed frames, doorways, windows or simply the gallery itself. Kounellis' work from the 1980s, which also consisted of sculptures and performances using unusual materials, traveled all over Europe. In 1974, he performed with Edward Kienholz, Wolf Vostell, and other artists in Berlin at the ADA – Aktionen der Avantgarde. His work has become integral to numerous renowned, international museums' collections.

=== Arte Povera ===
In 1967, Kounellis became associated with Arte Povera, a movement theorized by curator Germano Celant as a major shift from work on flat surfaces to installations. Kounellis participated in the exhibition 'Arte Povera – e IM Spazio' at the La Bertesca Gallery in Genoa curated by Celant, which brought together artists whose work was concerned with the space between art and life, and nature and culture. Examples of artists who substantiated this basis of Arte Povera as a movement include Alighiero Boetti, Luciano Fabro, Giulio Paolini, Pino Pascali, and Emilio Prini. To solidify the movement, Celant curated yet another group show, 'Arte Povera', which was exhibited at the De' Foscherari gallery in Bologna in 1968 with similar artists. In the same year Kounellis exhibited 'Senza titolo (Untitled)', which consisted of raw wool, rope, and a wooden structure all leaning against a wall. Finally, Kounellis was also included in 'RA3 Arte Povera + Azioni povere' which was organized by Marcello Rumma and curated by Celant.

In 1967, Kounellis installed "live birds in cages along with rose-shaped, cloth cut-outs pinned to canvas" alongside his painting. Through this shift in his work, "Kounellis was more interested in anarchical freedom from linguistic norms and conventional materials. The space of the gallery and the exhibition site in general were transformed into a stage where real life and fiction could join in a suspension of disbelief." The viewers became part of the scene of these living natural sources of energy within the gallery space. He continued his involvement with live animals later in 1969, when he exhibited twelve living horses, as if they were cars, in the Galleria l'Attico's new location in an old garage in Via Beccaria. Gradually, Kounellis introduced new materials, such as propane torches, smoke, coal, meat, ground coffee, lead, and found wooden objects into his installations. He also looked beyond the gallery environment to historical (mostly industrial) sites. In 1997, Kounellis installed thirteen wardrobes and two doors that were sealed in lead along a scaffolding ledge that blocked the entry to a central hall. In 1968, in an interview by Marisa Volpi. Kounellis stated that incidental adjustments are certain as aspects that can indicate the human liberty of life.

== Exhibitions ==
=== Selected solo exhibitions ===
- 1960: La Tartaruga gallery, Rome
- 1969: Attico Gallery, Rome
- 1981: Van Abbemuseum, Eindhoven
- 1982: Whitechapel Art Gallery, London
- 1988: Castle of Rivoli, Turin
- 1996: Museo Nacional Centro de Arte Reina Sofía, Madrid
- 2005: Albertina, Vienna
- 2007: Neue Nationalgalerie, Berlin
- 2007: Kounellis - Jaffa Port, Jaffa, Israel
- 2009: Tate Modern, London
- 2012: Goulandris Museum of Cycladic Art, Athens
- 2013: 'Kounellis per Trieste', Salone degli Incanti, Trieste, Italy
- 2016: Centro de Arte Contemporáneo Wifredo Lam, Havana, Cuba
- 2016: Monnaie de Paris, Paris
- 2016: The Negev Museum of Art, Beersheva, Israel; curator Adachiara Zevi;
- 2019: Fondazione Prada, Venice

=== Arte Povera group shows ===
- 1967: 'Arte Povera – e IM Spazio', La Bertesca Gallery, Genoa
- 1968: 'Arte Povera', De Foscherari gallery, Bologna
- 1968: 'RA3 Arte povera + Azioni povere', Arsenali della Republica, Amalfi
- 1969: 'Live in Your Head: When Attitudes become Form', Kunsthalle, Bern
- 1969: 'Op losse schroeven: situaties en cryptostructuren' 1969 Stedelijk Museum, Amsterdam
- 1970: 'Conceptual Art, Arte Povera, Land Art', Galleria Civica d Arte Moderna, Turin
- 1982: 'Arte Povera, Antiform, Sculptures 1966–69', CAPC Centre d'Arts Plastiques Contemporains, Bordeaux
- 2001: 'Zero to infinity: Arte Povera 1962–1972', Walker Art Center, Minneapolis

=== International exhibitions ===
Kounellis participated in many international exhibitions, including the Biennale of Paris (1971), Documenta (1972, 1977, 1982), the Venice Biennale (1972, 1976, 1978, 1980, 1984, 1988, 1993, and 2011), the Istanbul Biennial (1993), and the Biennale of Sydney (2008). His work has also been exhibited in many museums and institutions such as the Kunstmuseum in Bern, the Museum Boijmans Van Beuningen in Rotterdam, The Musée d'Art Moderne de la Ville de Paris, the Whitechapel Art Gallery in London, The Museum of Contemporary Art in Chicago, the Museo Nacional Centro de Arte Reina Sofía in Madrid, and the Neue National gallery in Berlin. In 1994, Kounellis held an exhibition titled Ionion, in which he displayed his work on a boat docked in his town of birth in Piraeus, Greece. He later curated another exhibition that on another ship called Apollo in 1973 as an addition to "Ionion".

== Later works and life ==
In October 2009, Kounellis exhibited many works at Tate Modern Gallery in London, United Kingdom. Jonathan Jones of The Guardian newspaper noted that his "Dry-stone walling, sacks of grain and rice, and a painting that includes part of the score of St John Passion by JS Bach, bring a sense of real life, organic and ancient, into the museum."

On 16 February 2017, Kounellis died at the Villa Mafalda hospital in Rome at the age of 80.

His estate is represented by Barbara Gladstone Gallery, New York/Brussels, and Sprovieri, London.

== Bibliography ==
- Germano Celant, Kounellis, Fondazione Prada, Milan, 2019. ISBN 978-8-8870-2976-5
- Philip Larratt-Smith, Rudi Fuchs, Michele Robecchi (ed.), Jannis Kounellis, Phaidon, London, 2018. ISBN 978-0-7148-7079-3
- Adachiara Zevi, Jannis Kounellis: The Negev Museum of Art, Be'er Sheva, Israel, 2017. ISBN 97896592048-7-8
- Annegret Laabs, Jannis Kounellis, Berlin, Jovis, 2012. ISBN 978-3-8685-9206-1
- Mario Codognato, Mirta D'Argenzio: Jannis Kounellis: Echoes in the Darkness, Trolley Books, London, 2012. ISBN 978-0-9542079-4-6
- Bruno Corà, Annamaria Maggi, Ruggero Martines, Jannis Kounellis, Silvana, Milan, 2011. ISBN 978-8-8366-1801-9
- Ines Goldbach, Wege aus der Arte Povera. Jannis Kounellis im Kontext internationaler Kunstentwicklung, Gebrüder Mann, Berlin, 2010. ISBN 978-3-7861-2620-1
- Adachiara Zevi, Kounellis: Jaffa Port, Har-El Printers & Publishers, 2007.
- Stephen Bann, Jannis Kounellis, Reaktion Books, Berlin, 2004. ISBN 978-1-8618-9152-5
- Dieter Roelstraete and Jan Hoet, Jannis Kounellis, Charta Art Books, Milan, 2002. ISBN 978-8-8815-8386-7
- Mary Jane Jacob, Jannis Kounellis, Museum of Contemporary Art, Chicago, 1986. ISBN 978-0-9338-5623-3
