= Paolo De Grandis =

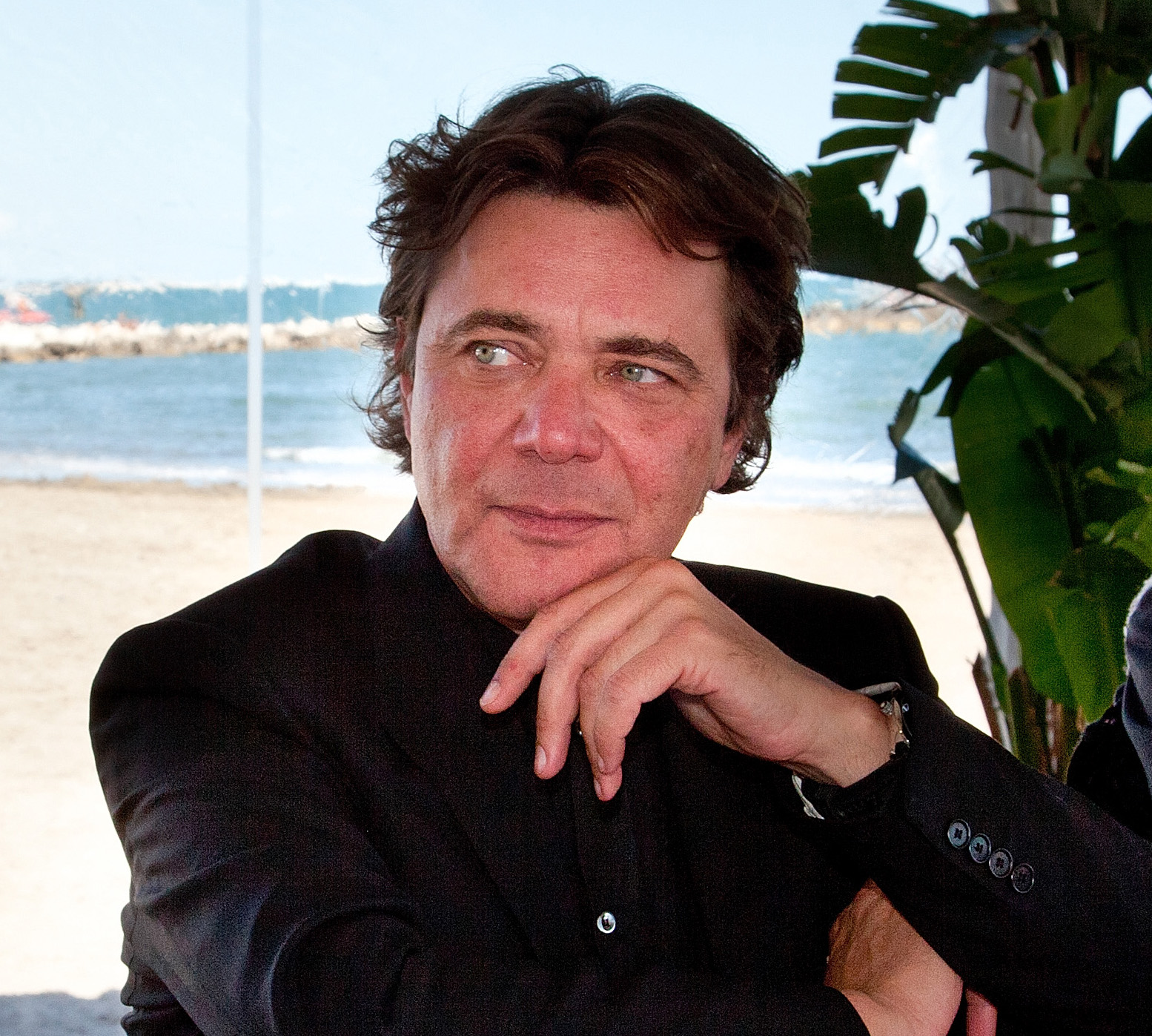
Paolo De Grandis at the press conference of OPEN13 in the Excelsior Hotel, Lido of Venice.

Paolo De Grandis (born 4 July 1957 in Venice, Italy, died 2024 may 11) is an Italian contemporary art curator and president of PDG Arte Communications. He lived and died in Venice.

== Life and career ==
De Grandis was born in Venice. At the end of the 1970s he moved to the US where he developed an interest in organizing art exhibitions. From 1984 to 1990 he directed the Academia Foundation where he organized his first exhibition Quartetto (1984) on the occasion of the 41st Venice Biennale at Scuola Grande S. Giovanni Evangelista. The exhibition included works by Joseph Beuys, Enzo Cucchi, Bruce Nauman and Luciano Fabro and was co-curated by Achille Bonito Oliva, Alanna Heiss, and Kasper König.

In 1985 the Academia Foundation and FIAT USA financed the first exhibition of Arte Povera in New York at the P.S.1 titled The Knot. It was curated by Germano Celant with works by Giovanni Anselmo, Alighiero Boetti, Pier Paolo Calzolari, Luciano Fabro, Jannis Kounellis, Mario Merz, Marisa Merz, Giulio Paolini, Pino Pascali, Giuseppe Penone, Michelangelo Pistoletto, Gilberto Zorio. 10% of the earnings from tickets sale were donated to the UNESCO for the campaign of the Protection of Venice.

At the beginning of the 1990s De Grandis left the Academia Foundation and founded PDG Arte Communications. In 1995 he helped organising Art Taiwan, the first National Pavilion outside the gardens of the Venice Biennale.

In 1998 De Grandis developed OPEN, an international exhibition of sculptures and installations held during the Venice Film Festival Pierre Restany curated the first five editions Over the years Open has annually progressed and expanded its horizons by bringing artists from more than 75 countries.

Artists who exhibited at Open include Yoko Ono, Marisa Merz, Emilio Vedova, Gaspare Manos, Richard Long, Niki de Saint-Phalle, Bernar Venet, Mimmo Rotella, Magdalena Abakanowicz, César, Arman, Beverly Pepper, Erik Dietman, Jean-Pierre Raynaud, Carl Andre, Keith Haring, Fabrizio Plessi, Julian Schnabel, Dennis Hopper, Feng Mengbo, Max Neuhaus, Chen Zhen, and Ju Ming".

De Grandis also gathered experience through numerous collaborations with Asia. He acted as commissioner of the Europe section for the Flag Art Festival in occasion of the 2002 FIFA WORLD CUP in Seoul, and two years later organized OPENASIA, a special edition curated with Chang Tsong-zung, Chinese contemporary art critic, presenting Asian artists as Yoko Ono, Ye Fang, Li Chen, Chen Zhen, Ye Hongxing, among others, and included projects as The Etruscans in the East curated by Philippe Daverio.

In 2006 De Grandis expanded to Morocco with the exhibition Fez Fez by Fabrizio Plessi, which inaugurated the Hassan Museum of Contemporary Art in Rabat, Directed by De Grandis and coordinated by Fathiya Tahiri, in the historic structure of Villa Andalucia. The project came by from the year before when De Grandis acted as curator of the 1st participation of the Pavilion of Morocco in the Venice Biennale during the 2005. 2014 Paolo De Grandis was a supporting actor in the video L'Uomo by Iris Brosch.

From the 2016, De Grandis collaborates with Claudio Crescentini and the MACRO Museum of Rome with the project From The Venice Biennale to MACRO . International Perspectives by presenting some of the exhibitions he has curated in the Venice Biennale as The Question of Beings by Yahon Chang from Taiwan.

== Other exhibitions ==
- 1984: Academia Foundation Prize during the XLI Venice Biennale (the German artists Lothar Baumgarten was awarded by a jury of the art critics Achille Bonito Oliva, Alanna Heiss, Pontus Hultén, Helena Kontova and Edy de Wilde);
- 1985: Arte Santa, with art works of Andy Warhol, Enzo Cucchi, Joseph Beuys, Gino De Dominicis, Julian Schnabel, and others, in the Loggetta Lombardesca of Ravenna, curated by Achille Bonito Oliva;
- 1987: Calligraffiti of Fire of Brion Gysin and in collaboration with William S. Burroughs, primary figure of the "Beat Generation";
- 1988: Birds in Spirit of Marcia Grostein and Hunt Slonem in the Chiostro di Sant' Apollonia;
- 1989: Trittico della Pace, an event that involved the Museum of Modern Art of Belfast, Museum of Modern Art of Kilkenny and the Museum of Modern Art of Dublin through donations of the neoexpressionist Georg Dokoupil;
- 1999: Utopia of Mikhaïl Turovski in Ponte della Canonica, Sezione Giovani with young artists in Palazzo delle Prigioni;
- 1999 – 2000: Plasters & Bronzes of Auguste Rodin in Palazzo delle Prigioni Nove in Venice, and Palazzo Isolani in Bologna;
- 2000: Apocalisse of Maria Luisa De Romans in Chiesa di San Stae, Venice.
- 2016: Changwon Sculpture Biennale curating Michelangelo Pistoeltto's Terzo paradiso and the Dynamic Sculpture of Jaime Arango Correa.
- 2017: Stills of Peace in Everyday Life as curator of Yahon Chang in the Cortile di Palazzo Ducale of Atri;
- 2017: 1st Karachi Biennale in Pakistan as curator of Yoko Ono, Michelangelo Pistoletto, Sarah Revoltella, Max Papeschi, Marco Nereo Rotelli, Elisabetta di Sopra and Federico Nero;
- 2018: TraVellArT, Sotto la Pelle del Leon, Alexandra van der Leeuw; From La Biennale di Venezia & OPEN to Roma International Perspectives, "7" Amin Gulgee, GAM Galleria d'Arte Moderna, Rome and MACRO; Palermo, Capitale della Cultura, Yoko Ono "INVISIBLE PEOPLE"; Yahon Chang of the Flow, Stills of Peace and Everyday Life; Morocco - Fathiva Tahiri - Fatiha Zemmouri, Museo Barbarella, Chieti; Scuderie di Palazzo Acquaviva, Atri 19th edition of Scogliera Viva. Sculpting the sea International Award - Paolo De Grandis member of the Jury Committee - Caorle, Venice; TraVellArt, Alchimia, Miriam Nicastro;
- 2019: Processional, an installation by Todd Williamson; TraVellArt, Out of Water, Alice Olimpia Attanasio;
- 2020: Miresi, Sguardi e architetture, Berlino/ Roma / Barcellona | Musei Capitolini alla centrale Montemartini, Galleria d'Arte Moderna.
- 2022: Carole A. Feuerman My Stories, Chiesa della Pietà - Cappella, Riva degli Schiavoni; Zhanna Kadyrova Palianytsia, Riva San Biasio, Venezia; Colore e Materia, in collaborazione con 193 Gallery, Venezia.

== Venice Biennale ==
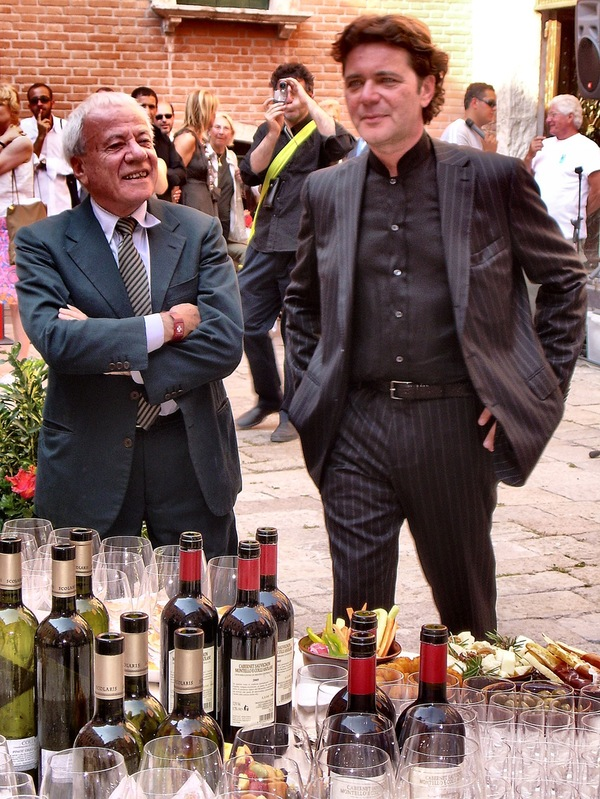
Achille Bonito Oliva and Paolo De Grandis during the inauguration of Adi Da Samraj at the 52 Esposizione Internazionale d'Arte – la Biennale di Venezia, 2007.

He has worked iteratively in collaboration with the Venice Biennale as curator, commissioner or coordinator in the first participations of diverse countries. "De grandis cooperation with the Venice Biennale has increased. In the mid-1990s he instituted pavilions outside the giardini area, allowing the participation of countries beyond those in the historical Biennale compound. Countries like Taiwan, Singapore, Hong Kong, Latvia, Estonia, Macedonia, Greece, Jamaica, Ukraine, Indonesia, Iran and Morocco turned to him and to his company Arte Communications to find suitable spaces all around Venice in which to exhibit".

First participations organized:

- 1995: Taiwan (1st participation in the 46th edition of the Venice Biennale in Palazzo delle Prigioni);
- 1997: Estonia (1st participation in the 47th edition of the Venice Biennale in Riva degli Schiavoni);
- 1999: Latvia (1st participation in the 48th edition of the Venice Biennale in Chiesa di San Giovanni Novo);
- 2001: Singapore (1st participation in the 49th edition of the Venice Biennale in Scuola S. Apollonia, Ponte della Canonica);
- Hong Kong (1st participation in the 49th edition of the Venice Biennale in Scuola S. Apollonia, Ex Musicanti);
- Jamaica (1st participation in the 49th edition of the Venice Biennale in Palagraziussi Antico Oratorio S. Filippo Neri);
- Ukraine (1st participation in the 49th edition of the Venice Biennale in Viale Trento, Giardinetti Napoleonici);
- 2003: Iran (6th participation (after 40-year gap) in the 50th edition of the Venice Biennale in Palazzo Malipiero);
- Indonesia (2nd participation (after 49-year gap) in the 50th edition of the Venice Biennale in Palazzo Malipiero);
- 2005: Morocco (1st participation in the 51st edition of the Venice Biennale in Chiesa S. Maria della Pietà);
- 2011: Andorra (1st participation at the 54th edition of the Venice Biennale in Chiesa di San Samuele);
- 2015: Ecuador (1st participation in the 56th edition of the Venice Biennale in Chiesa S. Maria della Pietà);
- 2018: Hong Kong and Macao - Biennale Architettura;
- 2019: Andorra, Azerbaijan Pavilions and Hong Kong Collateral Event of Biennale;
- 2021: Hong Kong and Macao Collateral Events;
- 2022: Cameroon (1st participation in the 59th edition of the Venice Biennale in Ca' Bernardo Molon and Liceo Guggenheim).
