= Malcolm Morley (artist) =

British-American visual artist and painter (1931 - 2018)

- Malcolm Morley with his work 'Thor', 2008
- Born: June 7, 1931; London, England
- Died: June 1, 2018 (aged 86); Bellport, New York, US
- Education: Royal College of Art, Camberwell College of Arts
- Style: Hyperrealism, Expressionism
- Awards: Turner Prize, 1984

Malcolm A. Morley (June 7, 1931 – June 1, 2018) was a British-American visual artist and painter. He was known as an artist who pioneered in various styles, working as a photorealist and an expressionist, among many other genres. In 1984, he won the inaugural Turner Prize.

== Life ==
Morley was born in north London. He had a troubled childhood—after his home was partially blown up by a bomb during World War II, his family was homeless for a time. He recalled that he had constructed a balsawood model of HMS Nelson and placed it on his windowsill when the German bomb destroyed the house along with the model. "The shock was so violent," writes one Morley expert, "that Morley repressed this memory until it resurfaced 30 years later during a psychoanalytic session."

As a teenager, Morley was sentenced to three years at Wormwood Scrubs prison for housebreaking and petty theft. While there, he read Irving Stone's 1934 novel Lust for Life, based on the life of Vincent van Gogh, and enrolled in an art correspondence course. He would later look back on these rough beginnings with some humor: "I [feel] very sorry for artists that haven't had much happen in their early life," he once said. Released after two years for good behavior, he joined an artists' colony in St. Ives, Cornwall, then studied art first at the Camberwell School of Arts, described by one art historian as being, at the time, "one of the more progressive and exciting art schools in London," and then at the Royal College of Art (1955–1957), where his fellow students included Peter Blake and Frank Auerbach. In 1956, he saw the exhibition "Modern Art in the United States: A Selection from the Collections at the Museum of Modern Art" at the Tate Gallery, and began to produce paintings in an abstract expressionist style. All the same, he would later say that "I would have liked to be Pollock, but I wouldn't want to be after Pollock. My ambition was too big."

Morley visited New York City, which was at the time a major center of the Western art world, in 1957. He moved there the following year, after which he met artists including Barnett Newman, Cy Twombly, Roy Lichtenstein, and Andy Warhol. His first solo exhibition was at Kornblee Gallery in 1964, partly at the urging of the art dealer Ivan Karp, who had a reputation as a talent spotter and had worked with the legendary dealer Leo Castelli.

In the mid-1960s, Morley briefly taught at Ohio State University, and then moved back to New York City, where he taught at the School of Visual Arts (1967–1969) and Stony Brook University (1970–1974).

Tackle, 2004 by Malcolm Morley

Morley had early solo gallery exhibitions at venues including the Clocktower Gallery, Institute for Art and Urban Resources, New York (1976); Nancy Hoffman Gallery, New York (1979); and Stefanotty Gallery, New York (1979). He participated in the major international exhibition Documenta, in Kassel, in 1972 and 1977, and in the Carnegie International, in 1985.

The Whitechapel Gallery, in London, organized a major retrospective exhibition in 1983, resulting in his winning the inaugural Turner Prize, awarded by the Tate, in 1984. The artist remembered the moment he learned he had won the prize: "When the call came to say he had won, he was sitting in his loft studio in the Bowery, 'watching a bum shitting on the street. It felt unreal: here I was watching this act; the next minute I'm told I've won the Turner. I was floored.'"

The following year, he bought a Methodist church in Bellport, Long Island, New York State, where he would reside for the remainder of his life. In the early 1980s he was married to the Brazilian artist Marcia Grostein. Morley was granted American citizenship in 1990. He was the subject of museum exhibitions at venues including Tate Liverpool (1991); the Musée National d'Art Moderne, Centre Georges Pompidou, Paris (1993); Fundación La Caixa, Madrid (1995); the Hayward Gallery, London (2001); and the Ashmolean Museum, Oxford (2013–14).

At the time of his death Morley resided in Bellport, New York, where he shared a home with Lida Morley, his loving and caring wife since 1986. He died in Bellport on June 1, 2018, six days shy of his 87th birthday.

== Work ==
Morley's earliest work upon leaving art school, while remaining in England, adopted traditional, naturalist styles of painting. His work was "a compromise between old-school observation-based naturalism and art that was modern mostly because its subjects were recognizably of the present."

After his arrival in New York, he began in the early 1960s to work abstractly, creating several paintings made up of only horizontal bands with vague suggestions of nautical themes, whether in imagery or in the works' titles.

He also met Andy Warhol and Roy Lichtenstein and, influenced in part by them, made the drastic change to a photorealist style (Morley preferred the phrase Superrealist). Inspired by seeing Richard Artschwager using this technique, he began to use a grid to transfer photographic images (often of ships) to canvas, and became one of the first and most noted photorealists, along with Gerhard Richter, Richard Artschwager, and Vija Celmins.

After seeing one of Morley's paintings of an ocean liner, Artschwager suggested that Morley visit Pier 57 and paint some ships from life. "I went down to Pier 57, took a canvas and tried to make a painting outside," Morley said. "But it was impossible to comprehend it in one glance, one end is over there, the other end is over there, a 360-degree impossibility. I was in disgust—I took a postcard of this cruise ship called the Queen of Bermuda." He would adopt this as his style for a few years, transposing images from a variety of sources (travel brochures, calendars, old paintings) to canvas. One factor that distinguished Morley from his photorealist peers was that rather than painting from the photograph itself, he was painting from printed reproductions such as postcards, sometimes even including the white border around a postcard image or the corporate logo from a calendar page. His choice of these bland materials was partly driven by a desire to find pop-culture imagery that other artists, such as Warhol and Lichtenstein, were not already using: “What I wanted was to find an iconography that was untarnished by art." Morley achieved "instant success" with such work.

Red Arrows, 2000.

In the 1970s, Morley's work began to be more expressionist, with looser brushwork, and he began to incorporate collage and performance into his work, for example in 1972, when he was invited to paint a version of Raphael's The School of Athens at the State University of New York at Potsdam, in front of an audience. He painted in costume as Pythagoras, who appears in the painting. When Morley realized that he failed to align one of the rows, he let the mistake stand in the finished work. His doing so serves as an example for one curator that the gridded reproduction technique is less concerned with faithful reproductions of the old masters and more with "untested possibilities of contemporary painting and pictorial construction."

His work often drew upon various sources in a process of cross-fertilization. For example, his painting The Day of the Locust (1977) draws its title from the 1939 novel The Day of the Locust, by Nathanael West. One scene in the painting is drawn from the opening scene of the novel, and other scenes are drawn from the 1954 film Suddenly and the 1925 Sergei Eisenstein film Battleship Potemkin. In the painting, the cover of a Los Angeles phone book is superimposed with a welter of imagery, some of it based on his earlier work (cruise ships, airplanes), and some on painted models, which became a mainstay of his subject matter for the remainder of his career. "I don't like to call them toys," the artist said, "I like to call them models. The thing about so-called 'toys' is that there is an unconsciousness in society that comes out in its toys. Toys represent an archetype of the human figure."

The artist turned to new subjects, including mythology and the Classical world, in his work of the 1980s, giving his paintings titles like Aegean Crime (1987), Cradle of Civilization with American Woman (1982), Farewell to Crete, and Black Rainbow Over Oedipus at Thebes (1988) and depicting Minoan figures; travel to the United States also resulted in prominent use of Native American kachina dolls and other motifs from those cultures. His commercial success offered him the opportunity to travel to these places and many more, resulting in diverse new influences and inspirations. He frequently adopted very loose paint handling, featuring drips and splashes. Similar expressionist brushwork and subject matter by artists such as Julian Schnabel, Eric Fischl, Georg Baselitz, and Anselm Kiefer resulted in curators identifying a "neo-Expressionist" movement, in which they included him, although he disliked the label.

The 1990s saw the artist return to his very early subject matter of large seagoing vessels, often with the addition of fighter planes that he built out of paper, painted with watercolor, and then attached to the surface of the canvas (resulting in, as he told an interviewer, the pun of a "three-dimensional plane"). In one example, Icarus's Flight (1997), the plane is some fifty-two inches deep. The artist also branched out into full-on free-standing sculpture, with one piece, Port Clyde (1990), showing a boat on a window frame, as if referring back to the artist's lost childhood model of HMS Nelson.

Contemporary photojournalism was the subject of the artist's paintings of the following decade, with motorcycle and car racing, football, skiing, swimming, and horse racing coming in for attention. The artist also returned to the "catastrophes" that were among his early subjects, depicting car crashes (including one showing the crash that resulted in the death of auto racing star Dale Earnhardt), the aftermath of the War in Afghanistan, and the collapse of a building in Brooklyn, among other subjects. In the last decade of his life, Morley continued to depict early- and mid-twentieth-century fighter planes, as well as the pilots who flew them during World Wars I and II, including the legendary flying ace Manfred von Richthofen, the "Red Baron." He also focused on 18th-century English history, creating works that incorporated military figures such as Arthur Wellesley, 1st Duke of Wellington and Horatio Nelson, 1st Viscount Nelson. "I fell in love with the period," he once said, "which was a great one for the British."

== Selected works in public and private collections ==
- Cristoforo Colombo, 1966, Hall Foundation
- Family Portrait, 1968, Detroit Institute of Arts
- Coronation and Beach Scene, 1968, Hirshhorn Museum and Sculpture Garden
- Vermeer, Portrait of the Artist in His Studio, 1968, The Broad
- Age of Catastrophe, 1976, The Broad
- Day of the Locust, 1977, Museum of Modern Art
- Cradle of Civilization with American Woman, 1982, Centre Pompidou
- French Legionnaires Being Eaten by a Lion, 1984, Museum of Modern Art
- Kristen and Erin, 1985, The Broad
- Black Rainbow Over Oedipus at Thebes, 1988, Hirshhorn Museum and Sculpture Garden
- Man Overboard, 1994, Hall Foundation
- Mariner, 1998, Tate
- Painter's Floor, 1999, Albright Knox Art Gallery
- Theory of Catastrophe, 2004, Hall Foundation
- Thor, 2008, Gary Tatintsian Gallery
- Medieval Divided Self, 2016, Hall Foundation

== Recognition ==
Selected Honors/Awards:

- 1984 Turner Prize, Tate Gallery, London, England
- 1992 Skowhegan School of Painting and Sculpture, Painting Award
- 2009 Inductee, American Academy of Arts and Sciences, Class IV: Humanities and Arts, Section 5: Visual and Performing Arts—Criticism and Practice
- 2011 Elected as Member, American Academy of Arts and Letters
- 2015 Francis J. Greenburger Award, Omi International Arts Center, Ghent, New York

== Selected institutional exhibitions and retrospectives ==
- 2022 - Malcolm Morley: Shipwreck, Nova Southern University Art Museum, Fort Lauderdale, Florida
- 2019 - Malcolm Morely, Hall Art Foundation, Reading, VT
- 2017 - Malcolm Morley: Works from the Hall Collection, Hall Art Foundation, Schloss Derneburg Museum, Derneburg, Germany
- 2013 - Malcolm Morley at the Ashmolean : Paintings and Drawings from the Hall Collection, curated by Sir Norman Rosenthal, Ashmolean Museum of Art and Archaeology, University of Oxford, Oxford, UK
- 2012 - Malcolm Morley: Painting, Paper, Process, Parrish Art Museum, Water Mill, New York City
- 2006 - Malcolm Morley: The Art of Painting, Museum of Contemporary Art, North Miami, FL
- 1993 - Malcolm Morley, Musée national d’art moderne Centre de création industrielle, Paris, France, travelled to Centre Georges Pompidou, Paris, France; Centre Régional d’Art Contemporain Midi-Pyrénées, Labège-Toulouse, France
- 1991 - Malcolm Morley: Watercolours, Bonnefanten Museum, Maastricht, The Netherlands, travelled to Kunsthalle Basel, Basel, Switzerland; Tate Gallery Liverpool, Liverpool, UK; The Parrish Art Museum, Southampton, NY, US
- 1983 - Malcolm Morley: Paintings, 1965 - 82, Kunsthalle, Basel, Switzerland, travelled Museum Boijmans-van Beuningen, Rotterdam, The Netherlands; The Whitechapel Art Gallery, London, UK; Corcoran Gallery of Art, Washington, DC, US; Museum of Contemporary Art, Chicago, IL; The Brooklyn Museum, NY, US

== Art market ==
1. $1,886,723 – SS Amsterdam in Front of Rotterdam, 1966. Christie's, Jun 30, 2015.
2. $997,455 – Cristoforo Colomb, 1965. Sotheby's, Feb 27, 2008.
3. $601,375 – Safety is Your Business, 1971. Christie's, Jun 27, 2012.

== Public collections ==
Morley's work is included in public collections including:

- Albright-Knox Art Gallery, Buffalo, New York
- Ashmolean Museum, Oxford, UK
- Astrup Fearnley Museum of Modern Art, Oslo, Norway
- Bonnefantenmuseum, Maastricht, Holland
- Broad Foundation, Los Angeles, California
- Centre Pompidou, Paris
- Corcoran Gallery of Art, Washington, D.C.
- Detroit Institute of Arts, Detroit, Michigan
- Everson Museum of Art, Syracuse, New York
- Herbert F. Johnson Museum of Art, Cornell University, Ithaca, New York
- Hirshhorn Museum and Sculpture Garden, Washington, D.C.
- Kröller-Müller Museum, Netherlands
- Louisiana Museum of Modern Art, Humlebaek, Denmark
- Ludwig Forum für Internationale Kunst, Aachen, Germany
- Ludwig Museum, Budapest, Hungary
- Masterworks Museum of Bermuda Art Paget, Bermuda
- Munson-Williams-Proctor Arts Institute, Utica, New York
- Museum Ludwig, Cologne, Germany
- Metropolitan Museum of Art, New York
- Musée National d'Art Moderne, Centre Georges Pompidou, Paris, France
- Museo Nacional Centro de Arte Reina Sofía, Spain
- Museum of Contemporary Art, Chicago, Illinois
- Museum of Contemporary Art, Los Angeles, California
- Museum of Modern Art, New York
- Museum van Hedendaagse Kunst, Utrecht, Netherlands
- National Gallery of Art, Washington, D.C.
- Nelson-Atkins Museum of Art, Kansas City, Missouri
- National Air and Space Museum, Smithsonian Institution, Washington, D.C.
- Orlando Museum of Art, Orlando, Florida
- Parrish Art Museum, Southampton, New York
- Rhode Island School of Design, Providence, Rhode Island
- Sammlung Frieder Burda, Baden-Baden, Germany
- Seattle Art Museum, Seattle, Washington
- Tate, London
- Virginia Museum of Fine Arts, Richmond, Virginia
- Wadsworth Atheneum, Hartford, Connecticut
- Walker Art Center, Minneapolis, Minnesota
- Whitney Museum of American Art, New York
