= Amin Gulgee =

Pakistani artist (born 1965)

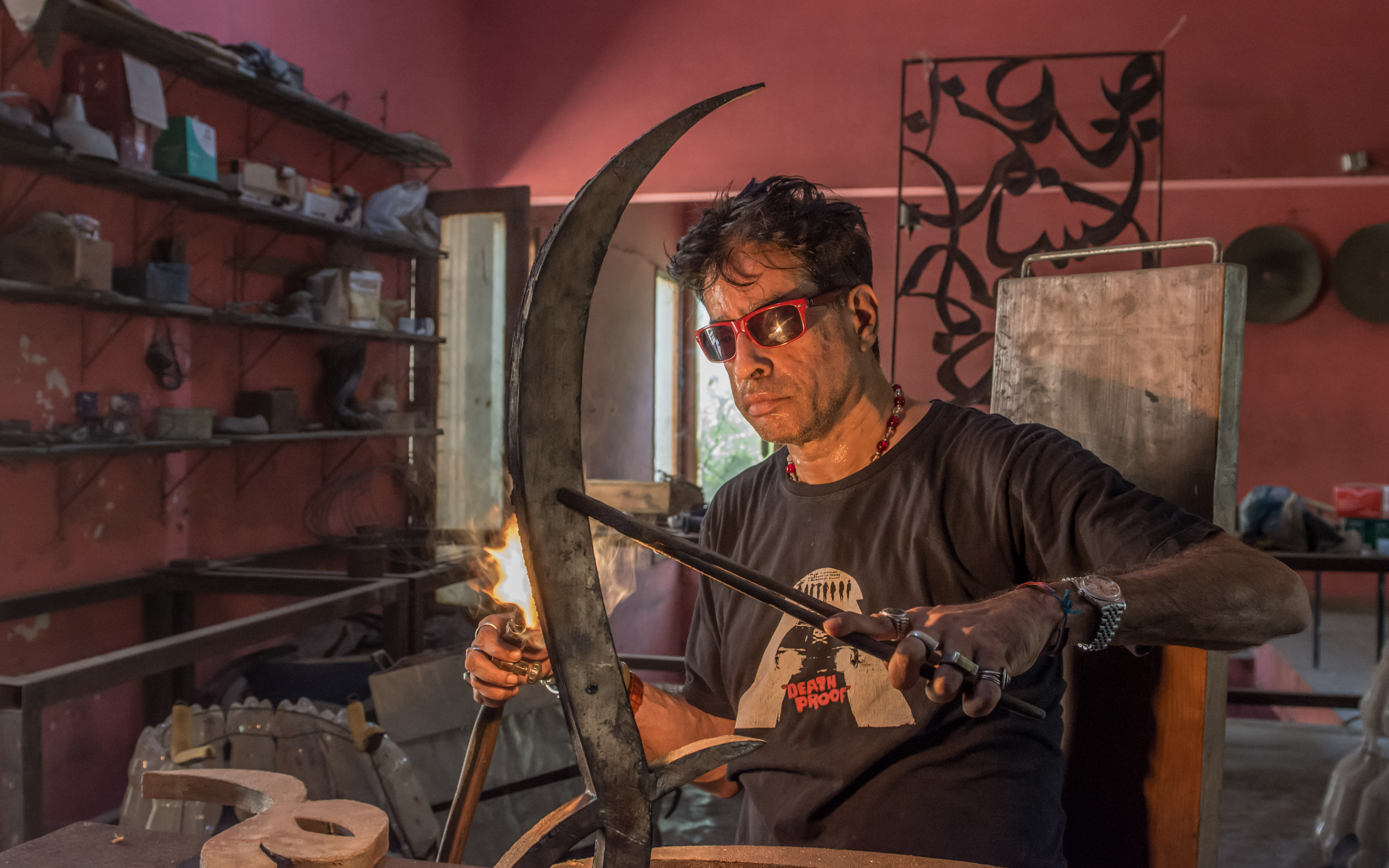
- Gulgee in his metal workshop, Karachi, 2018.
- Born: 1965; Karachi, Pakistan
- Occupation: Visual artist
- Known for: Metal sculptures, installations, performing arts
- Website: gulgeeamin.com

Amin Gulgee (born 1965) is a Pakistani visual artist and curator. His work encompasses sculpture, primarily in copper and bronze, installations, and performance art. He currently lives and works in Karachi, Pakistan.

== Early life and education ==
Gulgee was born in Karachi, Pakistan, to the modernist painter Ismail Gulgee.

He received a BA in Art History and Economics from Yale University in 1987 and won the A. Conger Goodyear Fine Arts Award for his senior thesis on Mughal gardens.

== Early work ==
Whilst doing his second major in Art History at Yale University, Gulgee was drawn into art, despite intending not to be an artist. Writing his thesis on Mughal gardens—which led to conversations with Oleg Grabar, his secondary thesis advisor—ignited his interest in Islamic art. He was attracted to the principles of repetition, symmetry, and geometric pattern.

His first body of work was jewellery created whilst living in New York. Nina Hyde, then Washington Post fashion editor, wrote:

"His jewellery is made from elements rarely worn by the wealthy women of Pakistan, who prefer gold and precious stones… even when he uses such unlikely materials as cowbells, nails and washers in his pendants, they rave – and wear them."

These pieces were large and heavy. He showed them at the Pakistani American Cultural Centre, Karachi, in 1988. He moved to Karachi in 1989, and immediately started to prepare for his first solo exhibition (1990) at a commercial gallery. Unable to buy his own equipment, Gulgee would work with the panel-beaters and metalworkers from 12 am to 4 am, when the rates were lowest. It was primarily in this environment that he learnt his craft.

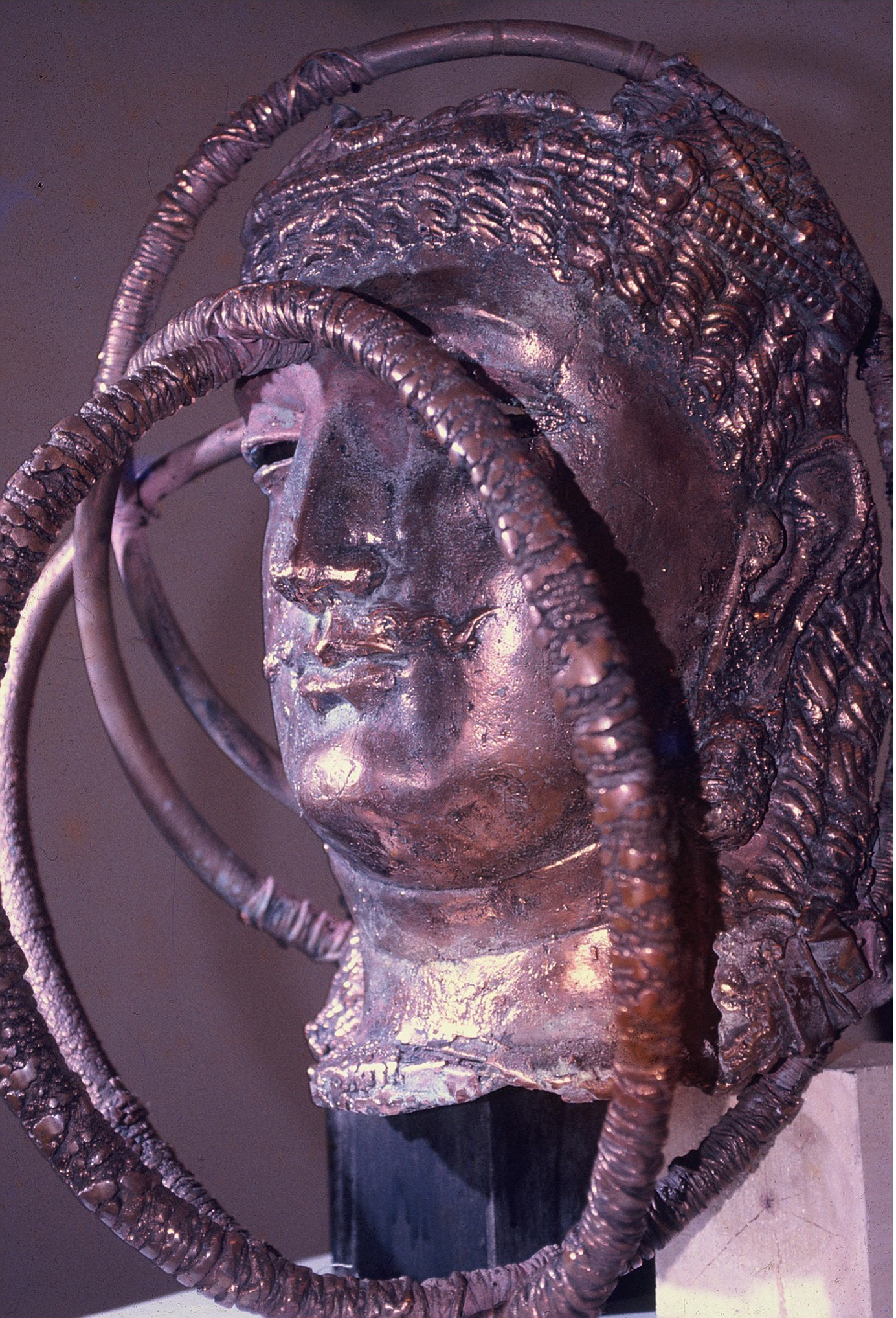
Amin Gulgee, Atomic Buddha, 1995.

Upon returning from almost six years in the United States, Gulgee felt a want to engage with the South Asian imagery he had grown up with. His parents were collectors of antiquities, so he was surrounded by statues of Krishna, Buddha, and Ganesh, as well as Islamic metalwork. He appropriated this South Asian religious imagery in copper and bronze, juxtaposing these with calligraphic forms from Quranic text.

Simultaneously, his jewellery became more wearable. Throughout the nineties, Gulgee became involved in the burgeoning Pakistani fashion scene after the military dictatorship of Zia ul-Haq, who had introduced strict Islamic legislation into Pakistan. At this point, fashion was theatrical and experimental, providing a stage for Gulgee's objects.

== Sculpture ==
Gulgee sculpts in copper and bronze. He does not "sketch or draw [his] work" in the process, allowing a certain freedom, as described by Islamic art historian Oleg Grabar:

…works by Gulgee bewilder us by the variety of their expressions, by an apparent freedom in technique and design, by the range of pleasures they offer… It is clear that Gulgee is trying to find the limits of a sculptor's art… he gives pleasure to the senses and excites the mind.

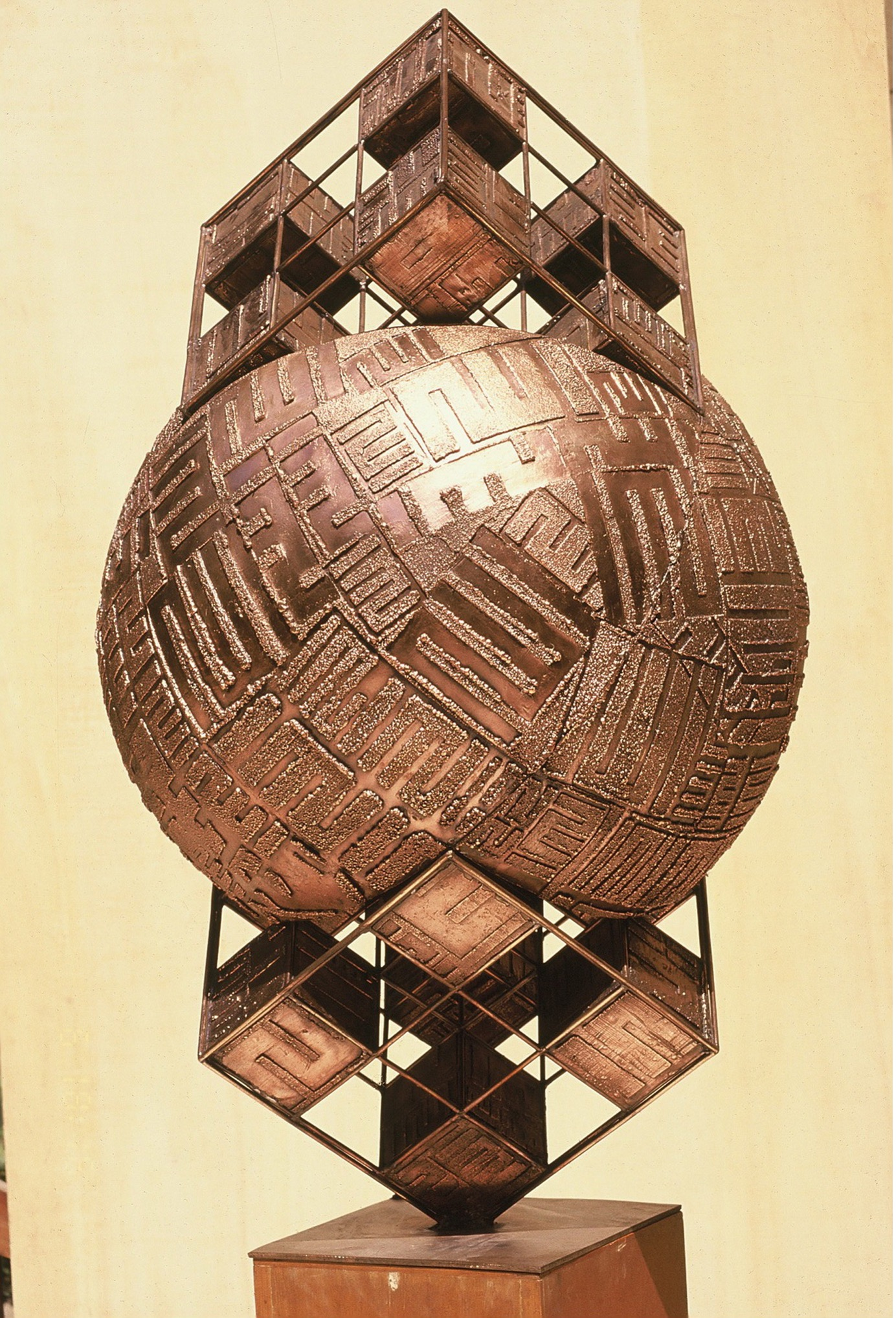
Amin Gulgee, Balance, 2003.

Gulgee's sculpture has spanned over three decades to date. His interest in form has gravitated towards both the organic and geometric. Within the geometric, he primarily works with the cube and the sphere. In two series, Char Bagh (2003 onwards) and Cosmic Chapati (2011–13), he has tried to reconcile the circle/sphere and the square/cube. A Char Bagh is an Islamic garden designed to a quadripartite plan: two lines intersect at a perpendicular, and one is able to draw a circle or a square around the edges. In these sculptures, he juxtaposed the sphere and the cube in quarters. In the Cosmic Chapati series, the round chapatis are formed by concentric circles of copper wire, creating and dividing the space within a cube.

His calligraphic work centres on repetition. Over the years, he has only used two lines from the Quran in a specific script. One is from the Iqra chapter: "God taught humanity that which it did not know", in the Naskh script. The other is from the Ar-Rahman chapter: "Which of the favours of God would one deny?", in the Eastern Kufic script. In his earlier works, these lines could be read, but later they became deconstructed and illegible. For Gulgee, remaining in these parameters is a fruitful challenge, and form becomes as important as content. In contrast to these more organic series of works, he has repeatedly used the invocation of "Alhamdullilah", in the Square Kufic script. This is a geometric script which is derived mathematically. These forms are architectonic and linear structures, in which the division of space is given precise, numerical order. Examples of this include his Algorithm series (2000 onwards).

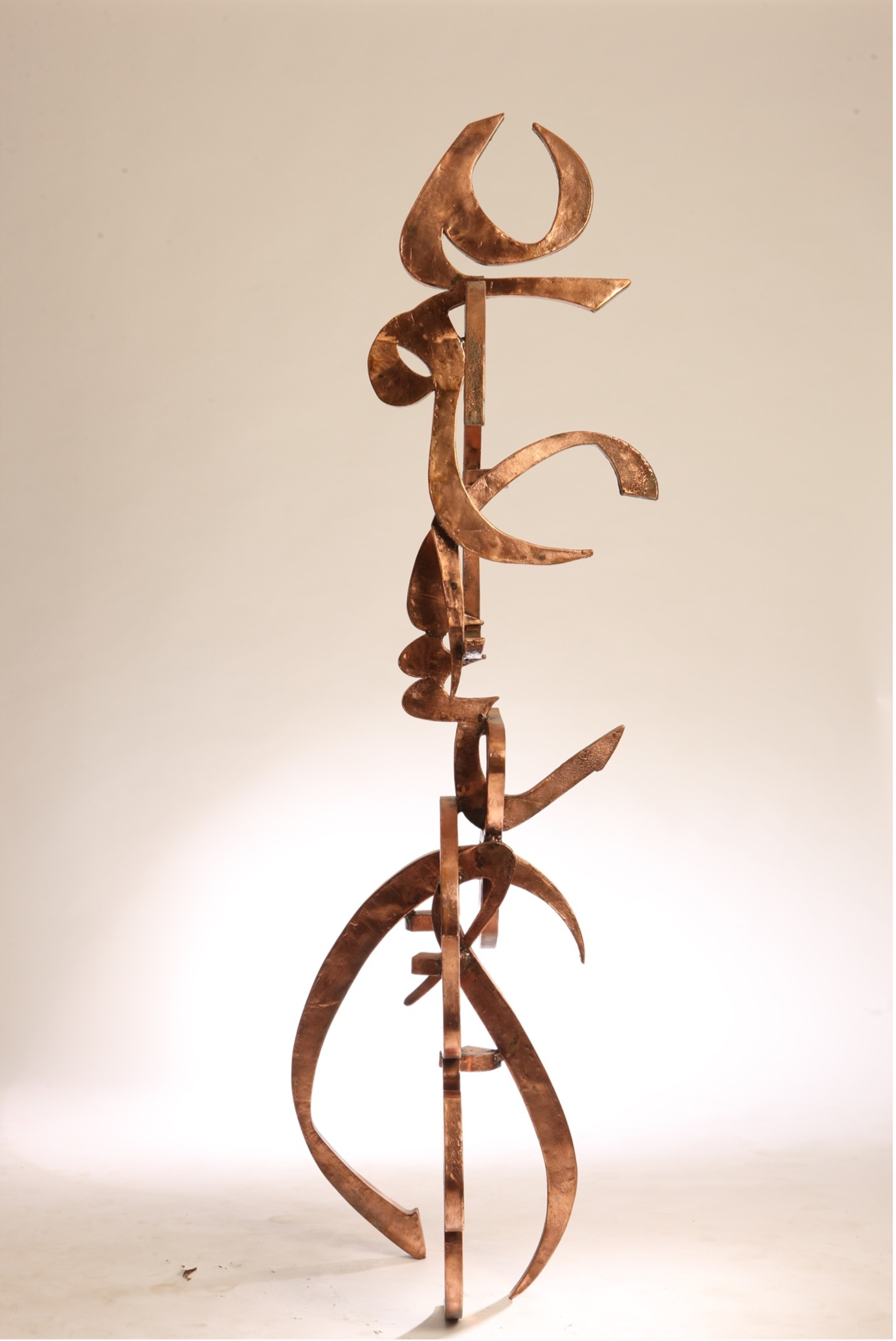
Amin Gulgee, Spider Raga VI, 2012.

Since the start, almost annually, Gulgee has revisited self-portraiture in his metalwork, specifically involving masks of his face. Each of these encapsulate the state of the artist at that time. Hands also appear, representing the human capacity for both creation and destruction. For Gulgee, they are his imagined hands, tying into the concept of begreifen explained to him early in his career by German intellectual Annemarie Schimmel, as "learning through touch".

== Installation ==
Responding to the architectural parameters of a space has always been a central tenet of Gulgee's work. This interest in the architectural can be traced from his art historical thesis at Yale on Mughal gardens. Hanging lunettes of colonial architecture salvaged from junkyards in Karachi, Amin created Purdah in 2002. It was twenty feet long and ten feet high, with sixteen stained glass architectural fragments, covered in a skin of beaten copper and bells. The Urdu word purdah not only means veil, but also refers to a curtain. Placed on the roof of Gulgee's residence and gallery, this evokes the sense of the private space in Islamic architecture.

On the second roof of his space, in 2005, Gulgee created another installation that can be viewed from the street, titled Salaam Gaudi. Using earthenware readily available in Karachi from the villages of the Sindh interior, and covering them with a skin of white concrete, mirror and glass, he formed a mosaic wall spanning the rooftop space. He also incorporated reused glass bottles, as well as sulfuric acid bottles used in his copperwork. The rooftop became a liminal space between the colours and craft of Sindh, industrial and chaotic Karachi, and the sea in the distance.

Building on his fascination with Mughal gardens, Gulgee constructed Char Bagh II, shown at Alliance française, New Delhi, in 2013, part of his solo exhibition Through the Looking Glass. Four independent structures, standing on a floor covered by sand, each had mirrored surfaces at the top and bottom, in which copper leaves hung, suspended in space.

With Char Bagh III, the leaves emerged from mirrored surfaces on the floor, with the central axis demarcated with sand. It was part of Open 20 in Venice, 2017, curated by Paolo De Grandis.

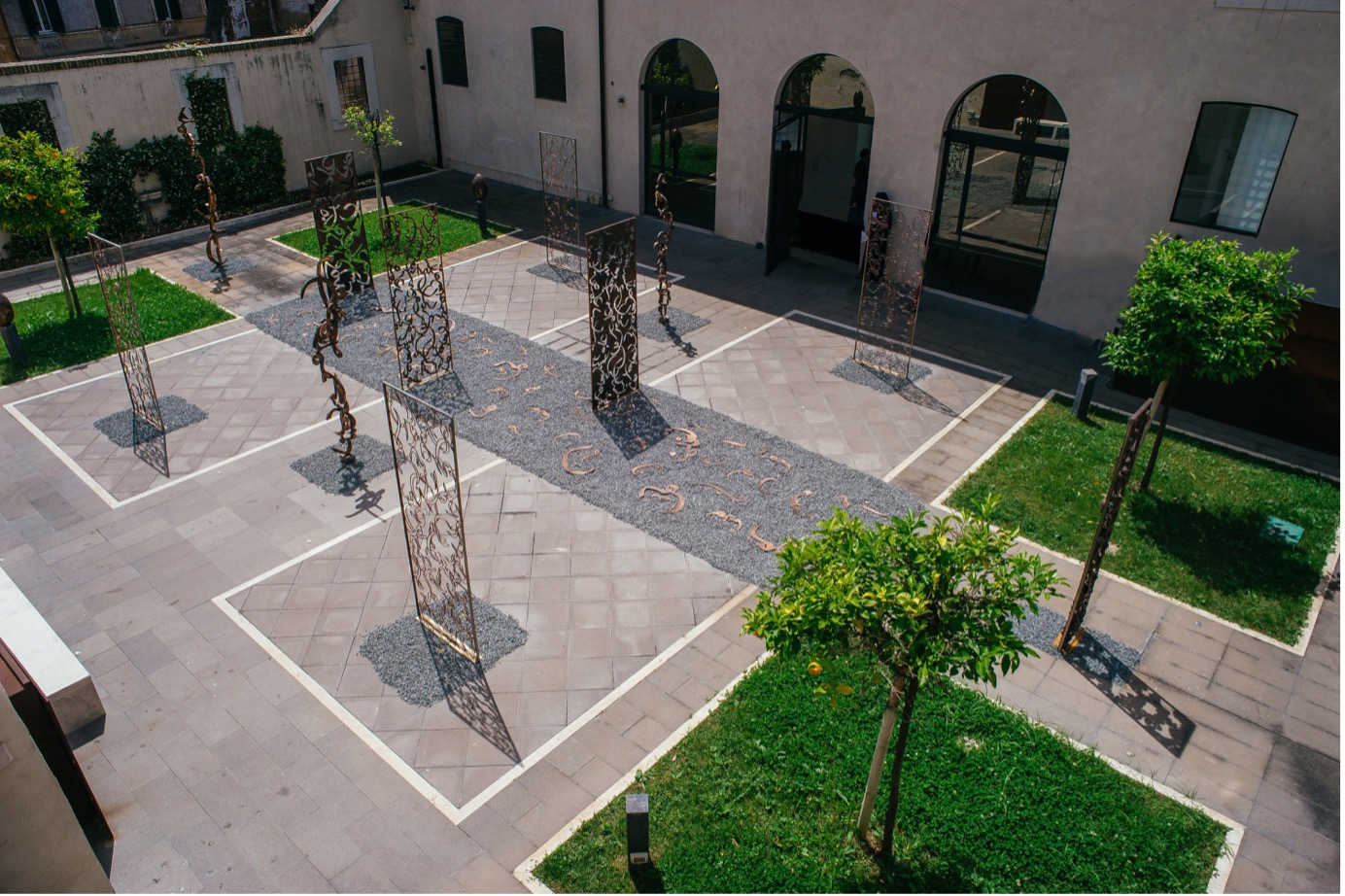
Amin Gulgee, 7 (installation view), 2018.

In 2018, Gulgee's installations 7 and 7.7 were shown in Rome. 7 was installed in the open courtyard of the Galleria Comunale d'Arte Moderna, transforming the monastic space into a sculptural char bagh. Its various pieces were formed from one Quranic āyah deconstructed into seven parts. Concurrently, Gulgee showed 7.7 at the Mattatoio di Roma (a former slaughterhouse). Whilst the component objects were interrelated as part of the same series, 7, the installations themselves were almost antithetical. The darkness of Mattatoio was in contrast to the bright outdoor space of the Galleria d'Arte Moderna.

For his solo-exhibition The Spider Speaketh in Tongues, 2022, at the South Asia Institute, Chicago, Gulgee presented three immersive installations: Liminal Letters, Spice Tray, and Char Bagh: The Spice Garden. These installations combined aspects that he had previously experimented with, such as leaves, hanging letters and mirrors, with the new addition of spices (turmeric and red chilli).

== Performance ==
Gulgee conceived and staged his own fashion show in 1999. Alchemy merged performance art, fashion and sculpture on the catwalk. He followed this with a further catwalk show, Sola Singhar (2001). In 2004, he choreographed a performance, Calculate, at Canvas Gallery. Artist Seema Nusrat calculated with an abacus made from colonial dolls heads. This began a continuing series of around thirty performance works to date (2022).

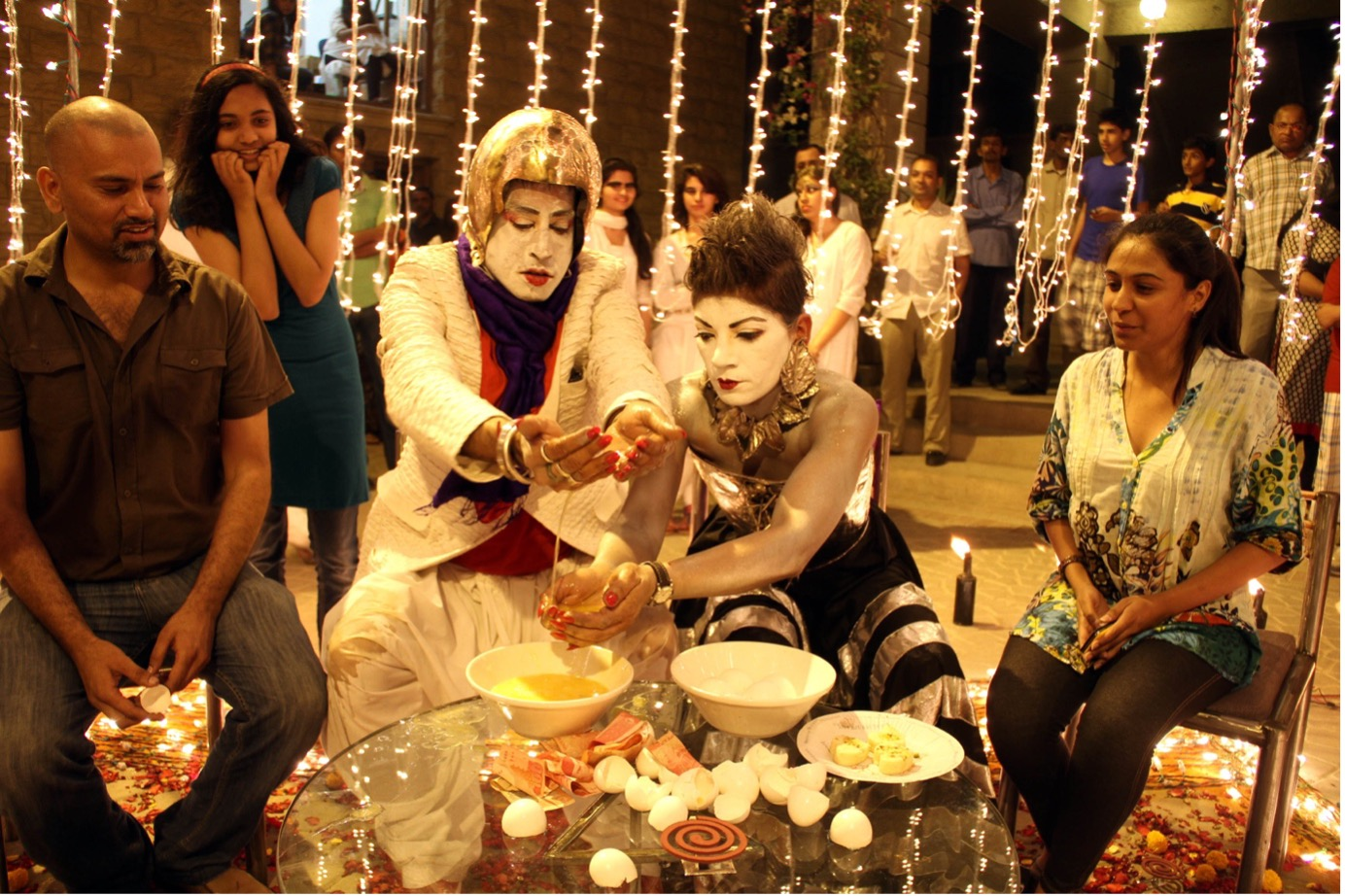
Amin Gulgee and Saba Iqbal, Love Marriage, 2012

In 2013, Gulgee performed Love Marriage in the open-air courtyard at the Indus Valley School of Art and Architecture. Artist Saba Iqbal and Gulgee wore geisha-like makeup blurring the lines between masculine and feminine. They devised a wedding ceremony consisting of breaking eggs into each other's palms, wearing objects created by Gulgee, and using the structure of a traditional South Asian marriage.

In 2014, in the theatre of the Arts Council of Pakistan Karachi, he staged Where is the Apple, Joshinder?, working with eight musicians, dancers, artists and actors over seven months to choreograph and envision this performance. It took place in his installation Char Bagh, examining gender roles and dynamics, a consistent feature of his performances.

In 2020, during the COVID-19 pandemic, Gulgee created a performance solely for documentation. In Healing II, he had his head ritually shaved, whilst wearing metal wings, in the rooftop installation Salaam Gaudi, surrounded by people close to him. This was a continuation of an earlier work, The Healing (2010).

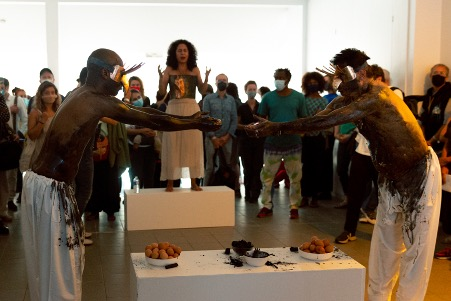
Aida Nosrat (background), Amin Gulgee, Lamyne N, This Is Not Your El Dorado, September 11th, 2021.

In 2021, Gulgee conducted a performance at the Cité internationale des arts, Paris as part of Afriques: Performative utopias. Gulgee's This Is Not Your El Dorado had 18 participants including himself. All the performances happened simultaneously over seventy-seven minutes, and the audience traversed the five levels of the gallery space.

== Public work ==
Gulgee's copper and bronze works can be installed in the open. There are more than ten such public works.

Steps (2003) was originally created for his exhibition Char Bagh, and was then placed at the entrance of Parliament House in Islamabad.

Forgotten Text was commissioned in 2004 for Bilawal roundabout, Karachi. It was a 40-foot high sculpture in copper, glass, computer motherboards, and steel, and its form consisted of three hieroglyphics from the Indus Valley Civilisation. It mysteriously disappeared—in its entirety—in 2008.

Reaching for the Skies was permanently installed in the rose garden of the United Nations in New York City in 2019. This work, in bronze, consisting of "grasping" hands, is about seven feet high.

== Curation ==
Gulgee began curation in 2000 with Urban Voices, in the main lobby of the former Sheraton Hotel, during Artfest Karachi. This was a series of four exhibitions, juxtaposing emerging and established Pakistani artists.

Also in 2000, Gulgee and John McCarry established the Amin Gulgee Gallery, a non-commercial space in his residence. This was conceived as an experimental space to incubate new ideas and foster artistic dialogue in Karachi. Every exhibition is accompanied by documentation. The gallery has hosted over thirteen exhibitions. One example is The 70s: Pakistan's Radioactive Decade (2016), an attempt to understand this tumultuous decade of Pakistan's history through cultural production that included the work of 51 artists and was accompanied by a book published by Oxford University Press.

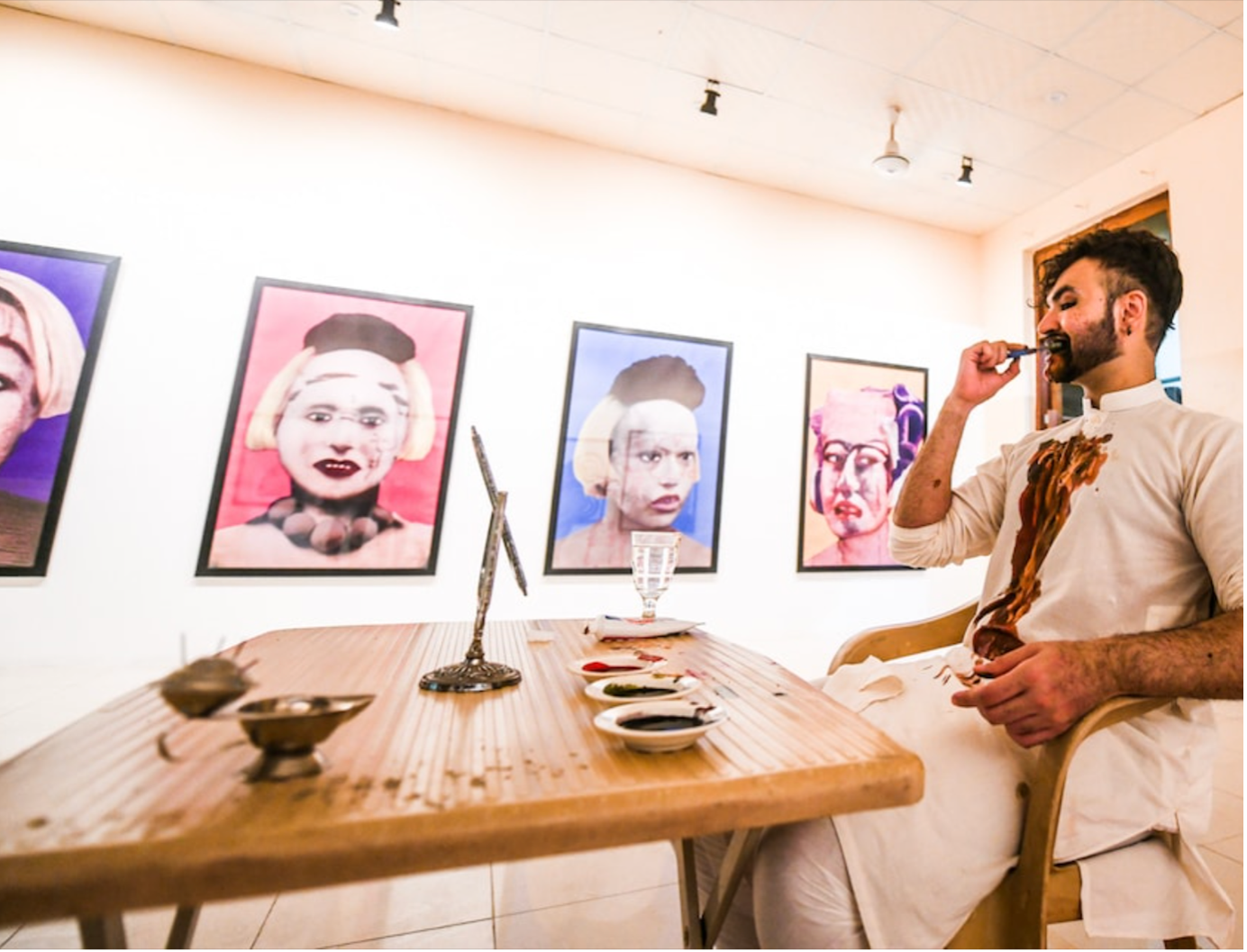
ORLAN, Défiguration-Reefiguration, Self-hybridation précolombienne n°1, and Muhammad Ali Mirchi, Brushing, Karachi Biennale 2017.

In 2017, Gulgee was the Chief Curator of the inaugural Karachi Biennale, Pakistan's first biennial. It contained the work of 182 Pakistani and international artists, in 12 venues across the city, with the theme "Witness".

Since then, Gulgee has continued to venture outside conventional art spaces, curating six public art events, and with an emphasis on performance and emerging artistic media in Pakistan.

== Publications ==
- Niilofur Farrukh, Amin Gulgee, and John McCarry, eds. Pakistan's Radioactive Decade: An Informal Cultural History of the 1970s. Karachi: Oxford University Press, 2019.
