= Cradle of Civilization with American Woman =

Painting by Malcolm Morley

Cradle of Civilization with American Woman is a 1982 painting by Malcolm Morley, inspired by the artist's visit to Greece that year. The painting is in the permanent collection of the Musée National d'Art Moderne, in the Centre Pompidou, in Paris, France.

== Background ==
This canvas was executed during a period when Morley turned to new subjects, including mythology and the Classical Western world. It was joined in his output by other works with similar themes among which are Aegean Crime (1987), and Black Rainbow Over Oedipus at Thebes (1988). One of the signature elements of these works is their depiction of Minoan figures.

The work is included in the volume Post-Modernism: The New Classicsm in Art and Architecture, New York 1987, by Charles Jencks which helped to layout the visual art canon of the emergent Post-Modern school of visual aesthetics.
