= La mela reintegrata =

Sculpture by Italian artist Michelangelo Pistoletto

- The sculpture in 2017
- Artist: Michelangelo Pistoletto
- Location: Milan, Italy

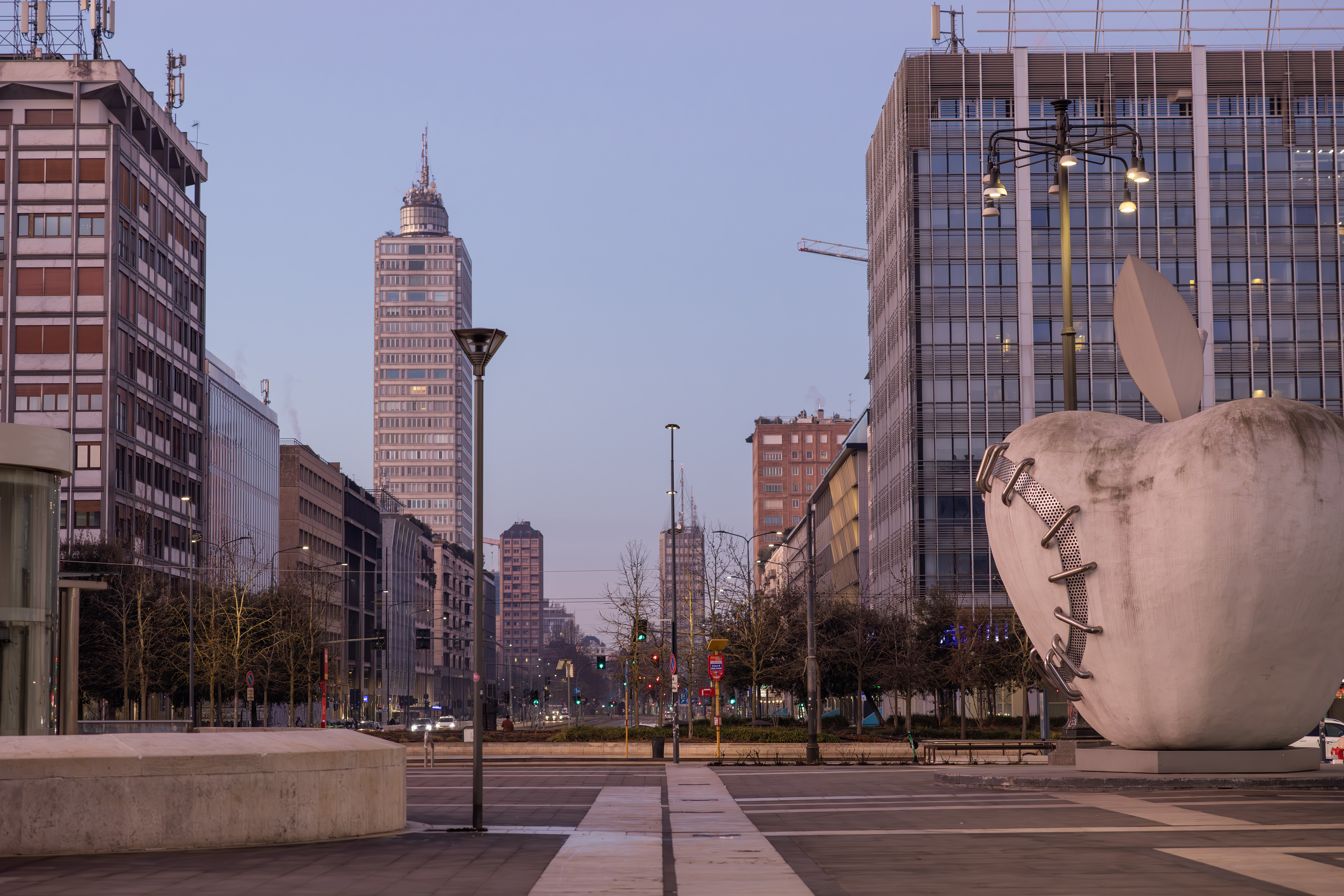
Piazza Duca d'Aosta, 2024

La mela reintegrata is a sculpture by Italian artist Michelangelo Pistoletto, installed in Piazza Duca d'Aosta, near the Milano Centrale railway station in Milan, Italy.
