= Venus of the Rags =

Sculpture by Mimmo Paladino

Venus of the Rags (Italian: Venere degli stracci) is a mixed media sculpture by Michelangelo Pistoletto. The piece is intended as a critique of contemporary consumerism.

The work consists of a statue of the Roman Goddess Venus next to a pile of rags.

== 2023 Naples version ==
In 2023 a giant version of the work was installed in the Piazza del Municipio in Naples in June 2023. It was destroyed by suspected arson two weeks after its installation. Pistoletto said that his first reaction to the destruction of the piece was " ... a strong control of emotion because reason must always win for me". He plans to recreate the work and crowdsourcing funding has begun. The Mayor of Naples, Gaetano Manfredi said that " ... the work will be redone. Violence and vandalism will not stop art, regeneration and culture in Naples".
