= Piazza Duca d'Aosta =

Coordinates: 45.48489°N 9.20328°E

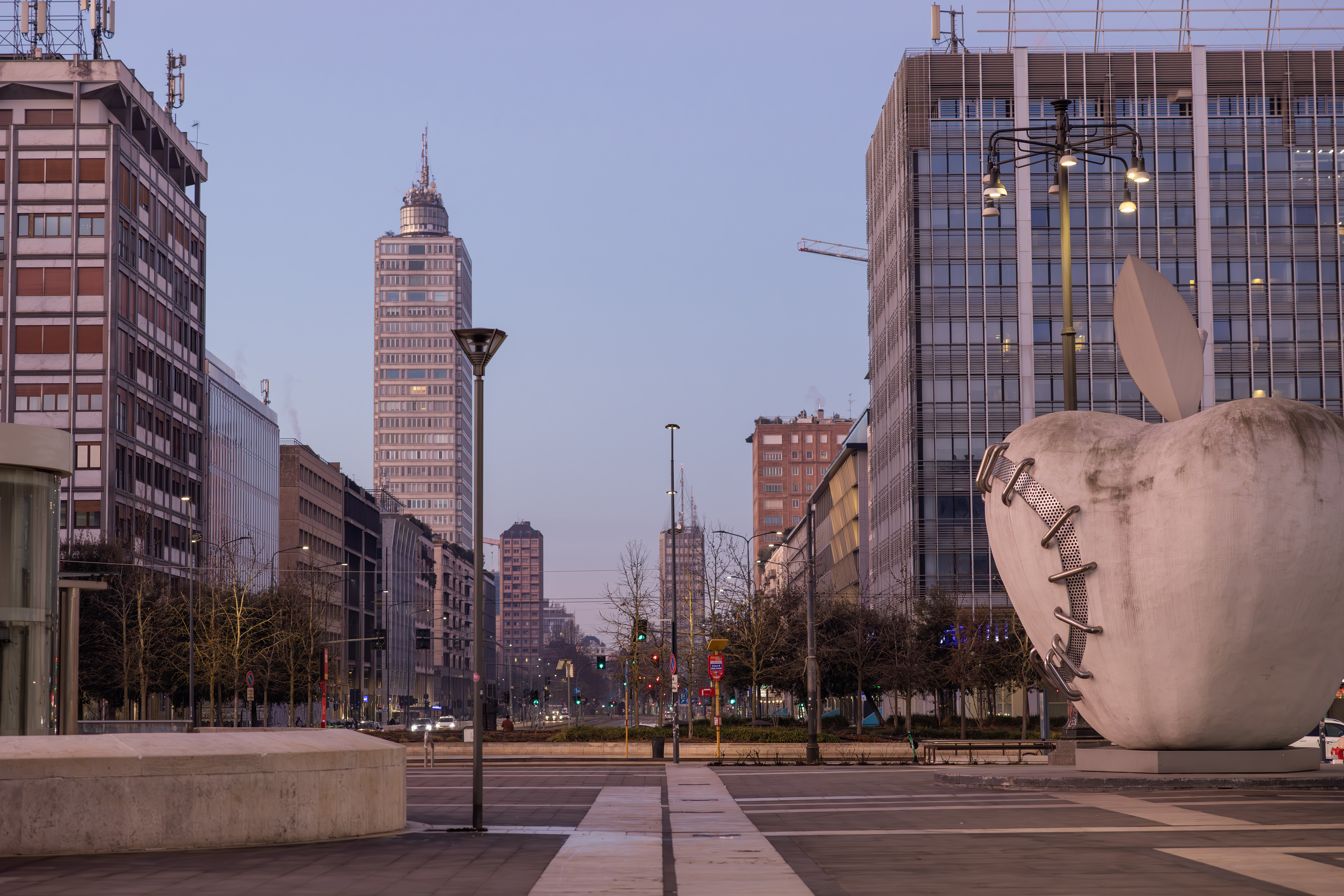
The Piazza front, 2023

The Piazza Duca d'Aosta is a large and busy square in Milan, Italy, where Milan's Central Station, the Pirelli Tower and the city's business district is located. It is well known for containing the architecturally impressive and majestic Milan Central Station, several skyscrapers (including the Pirelli Tower) and exclusive hotels, such as the Excelsior Hotel Gallia.

== History ==
Piazza Duca d'Aosta seen from the roof of the Milano Centrale railway station

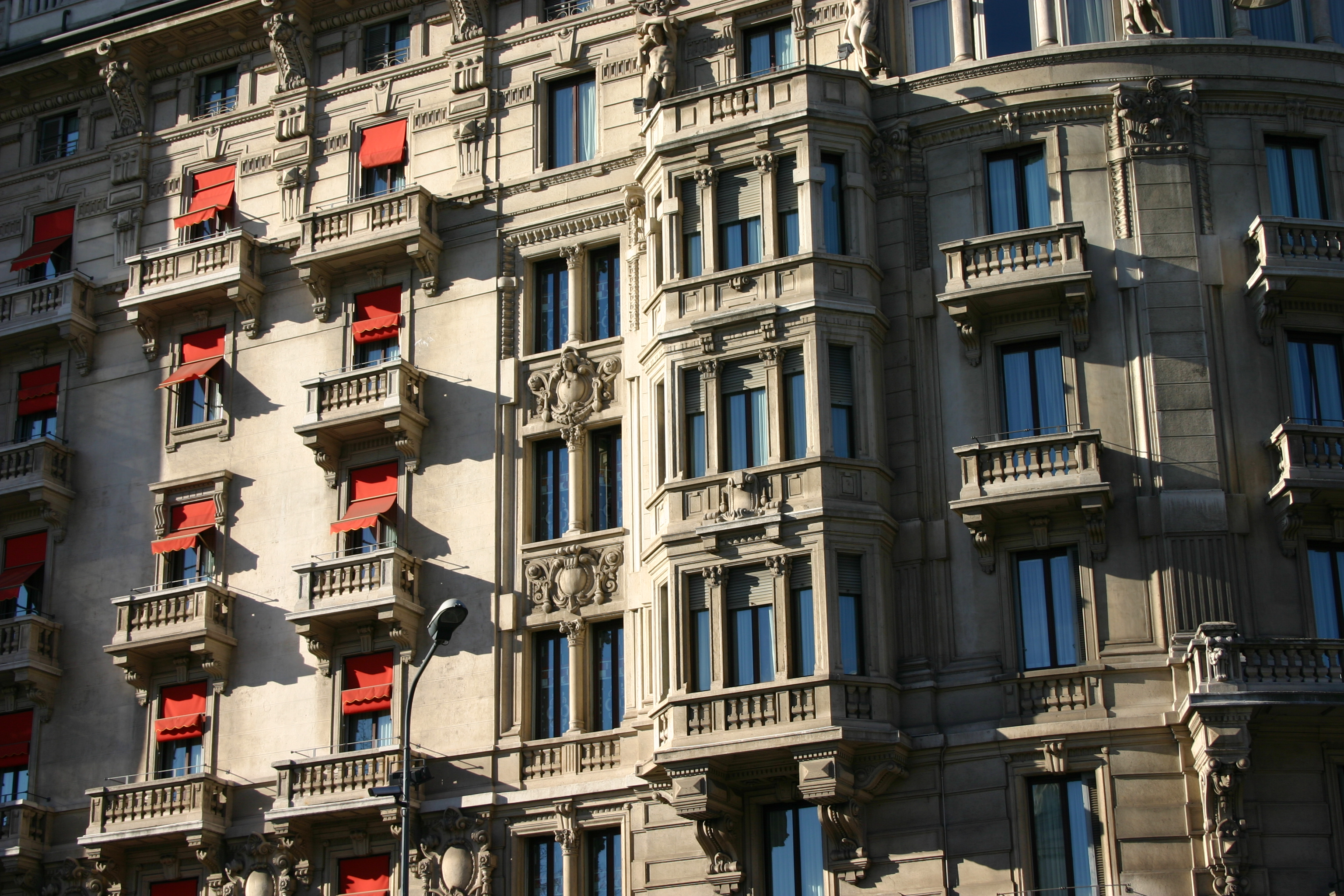
The exclusive Hotel Gallia, situated in Piazza Duca d'Aosta

Piazza Duca d'Aosta, located north of the historical center of Milan, was built around 1865 to serve the new Milan Central Station. Originally called Piazzale Stazione Centrale, the square featured a large garden with vehicular and tram traffic circulating around it.

In 1931, with the construction of the new Central Station, the station in Piazza della Repubblica was demolished and the square was expanded to its current size.

The choice of a terminal station created some anomalies with respect to the pre-existing urban layout. The central axis of the station building is in fact offset from that of Piazzale Duca d'Aosta and Via Vittor Pisani.

The first two causes of this anomaly date back to the Beruto master plan of 1889 and 1906. The first did not take into account the orientation of the bastion and Via Principe Umberto when designing a new square behind the old Central Station. The second mistake was the choice of orienting the new Central Station perpendicular to the outer ring road, instead of on the frontal Via Vittor Pisani.

In 1931, with the demolition of the old station, the project for the redevelopment of Piazza della Repubblica began, which since 1924 was destined to become the new access point to the historical city.

After several hypotheses, the city administration favored the creation of a district of offices and luxury homes. Among the most significant buildings are the Bonaiti and Malugani houses by Muzio (1935-36) and the Torre Turati (1963-68), symmetrical to the tower by Luigi Mattioni.

The current appearance of Piazza Duca d'Aosta is the result of the winning project of the competition announced in 1988 by the Metropolitana Milanese and the Municipality of Milan. The project, by architects Antonio Zanuso, Carlo Chambry and William Pascoe, contributed to modernizing the area and making it more functional.

== See also ==
- La mela reintegrata
