= Todd Williamson =

American painter

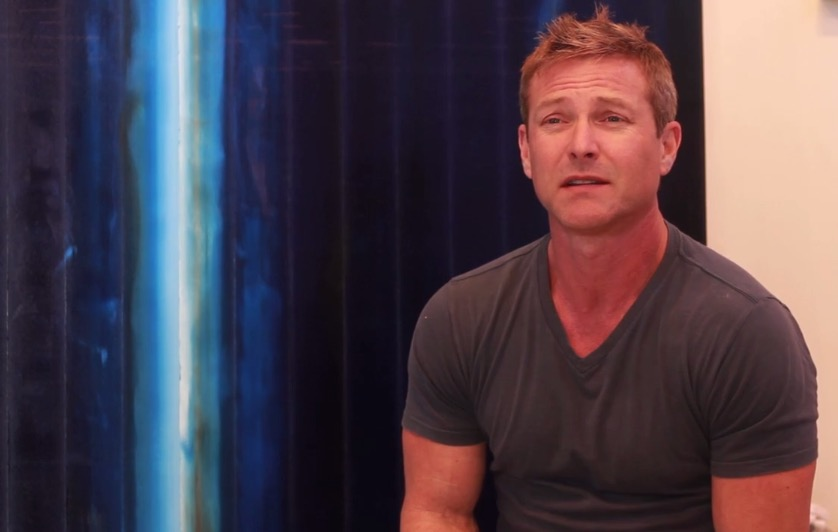
Todd Williamson (2016)

Todd Williamson (born January 24, 1964, in Cullman, Alabama) is an American artist specializing in contemporary abstract expressionism.

== Life ==
=== Development and artistic influence ===
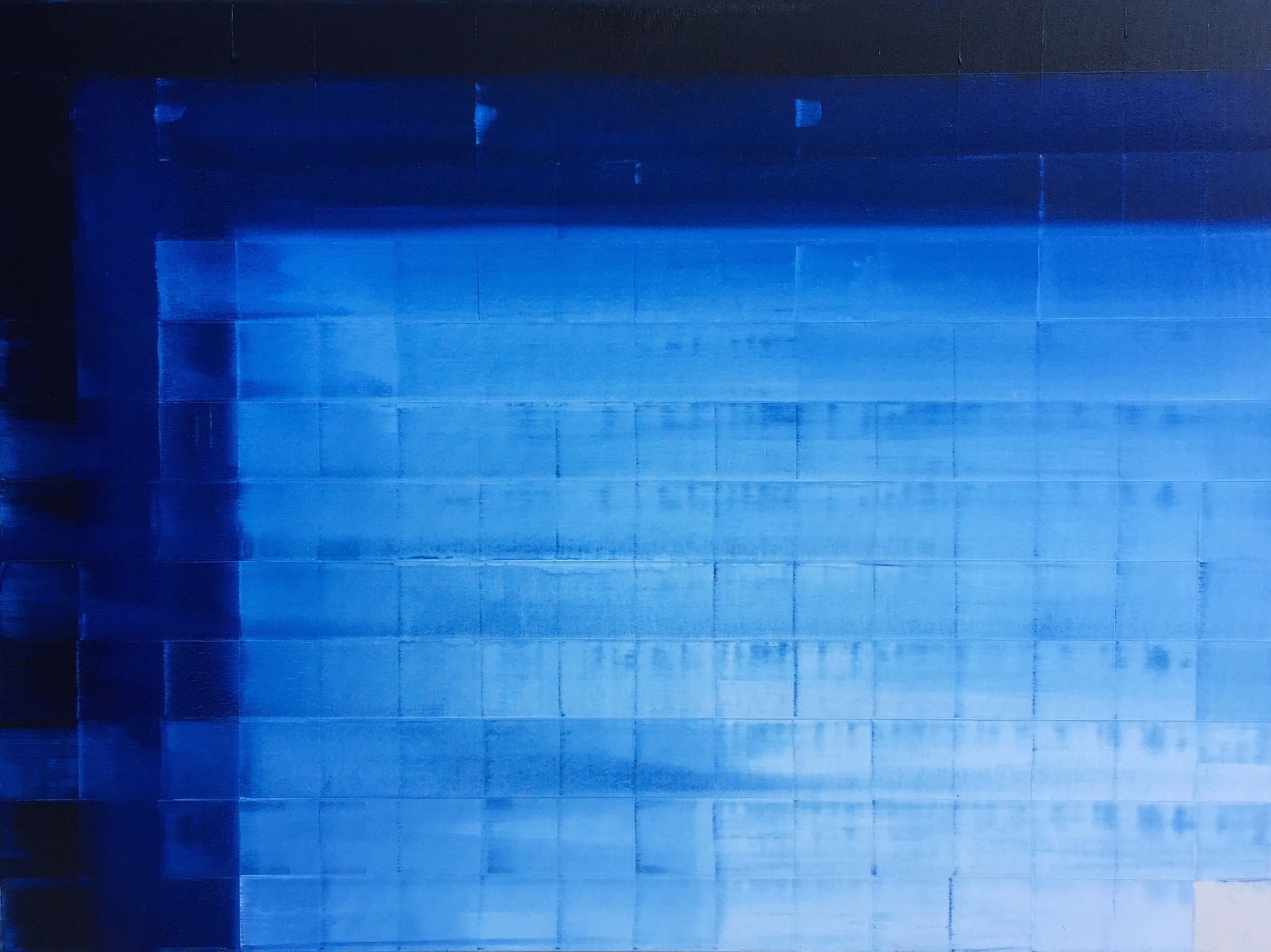
Searching the Void (2016)

Todd Williamson was born and raised in Cullman, Alabama. In 1984 he began his artistic career with art and music study at Belmont University in Nashville, Tennessee. Come 1986, Williamson was recruited to the University of Alabama at Birmingham to work with their theatre for one year. He then returned to the Belmont University and concluded his study program with a BA in 1988. In the following year, Williamson moved to California and studied at California State University, and UCLA, working towards his MA. Since 2004, Williamson works as a professional artist in Los Angeles.

Besides being stimulated by the works of Mark Rothko, Ellsworth Kelly, Barnett Newman and Helen Frankenthaler, his works include elements of classical modern art, with references to the Chiaroscuro technique, and to the California Light and Space movement of the 1960s and 1970s. Williamson has been deeply influenced by his early musical studies. His works attempt to show the connection between art and the expression of music, the objective being to give the viewer an all-embracing artwork ("Gesamtkunstwerk") of "musical art" or "visual music".

=== Style and techniques ===
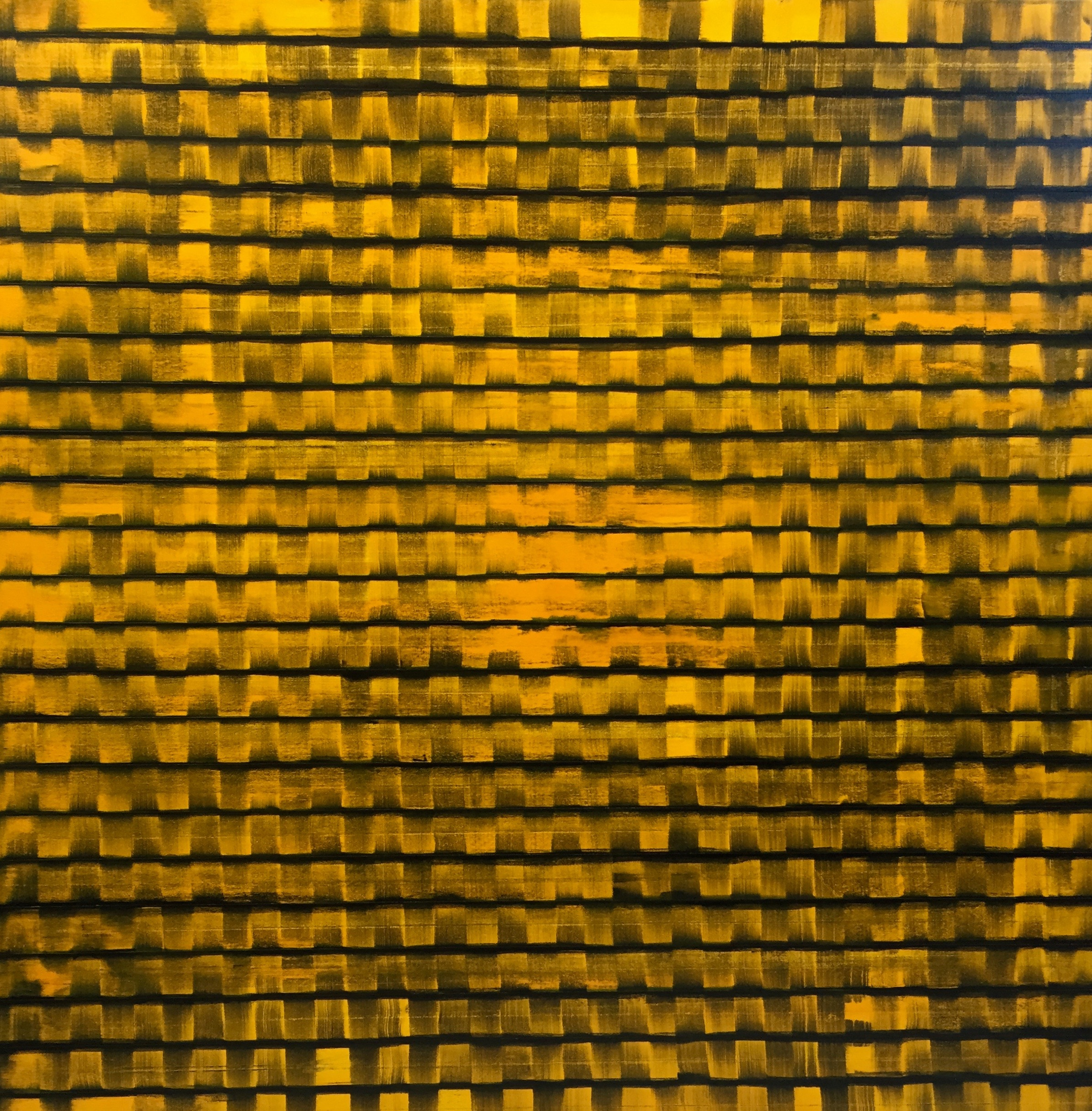
Chasing Butterflies (2015)

Williamson's paintings are structured color compositions, effected by the abstract expressionism, and an enhancement of the Color field painting. While the color field painting is marked by large-scale, homogeneously filled fields, Williamson interprets this style in a new manner: His works are mostly composed of multilayered color grids which differentiate themselves symmetrically of each other or go over into each other. He does this by using a variety in thickness of paint as well as a series of lines and grids which create a framework to control the chaos and emotion of the painted color-fields, creating an ethereal and multi-layered surface. The borders which are typical for the color field painting become blurred; to its place steps the impression of the complete works which connects the structure of the underground with the play of the colors.

Williamson dealt first with figurative art, and has developed mono-chromatic works since about 1990. His mono-chromatic works are not necessarily limited to the dominance of only one color. However, many of his latest works are characterized by parallel lines which move in both horizontal, and vertical direction. He often uses contrasts in the form of bright and dark dividing lines which split his work by adding and leaving out light. For example, at the prelude and the end of a partiture. Williamson tries in this manner to create a bridge from expressionist painting to musical expressionism.

=== Exhibitions ===
Todd Williamson's works have been shown in over 60 exhibitions worldwide. His work is in numerous collections around the world and was included in the permanent collection of the Pio Monte della Misericordia in 2015 where it hung next to Caravaggio's Seven Works of Mercy for a period of time. Besides single exhibitions e.g. in Milan, Montreal, Paris, Rome and Venice, joined exhibitions were put in Abu Dhabi, Berlin, Shanghai and Peking together with artists like Ed Ruscha, Jenny Holzer, Chuck Close and Robert Ryman. Williamson has also done a number of public art works including the Sun America Building in Century City, the California Bar Association Los Angeles, the Nashville International Airport as well as the Aria Hotel and Casino in Las Vegas.

- 2020: Georges Bergès Gallery, New York
- 2020: art Karlsruhe, Karlsruhe
- 2020: BEGE Galerien, Ulm
- 2019 Biennale di Venezia, Venice
- 2019: MAC Museum Art & Cars, Singen (Hohentwiel)
- 2019: Art Gallery Wiesbaden
- 2018: NUMU New Museum Los Gatos, Los Gatos
- 2017: Ex Fabbrica Lucchesi, Prato
- 2016 Palm Springs Art Museum – Saguaro Artist Council Exhibition, Palm Springs
- 2015 Pio Monte della Misericordia – "Contemporary Response to Caravaggio" (Curator: Cynthia Penna, Art 1307), Naples
- 2015 Gallery Premium Modern Art, Heilbronn
- 2014 Nicole Longnecker Gallery – "Inside the Lines", Houston
- 2014 Kevin Barry Fine Art – "Laddie John Dill & Todd Williamson", Santa Monica
- 2013 Fellini Gallery, Berlin
- 2013 Wade Wilson Art – "Illusion of the Precise" (with Robert Ryman), Houston
- 2012 P.A.N. Museum – "Todd Williamson a PAN!" (Curator: Cynthia Penna, Art 1307), Naples
- 2011 George Billis Gallery – "Thoughts from a Mind Like Mine", Los Angeles
- 2010 Ippodo Gotenyama Gallery, Tokyo
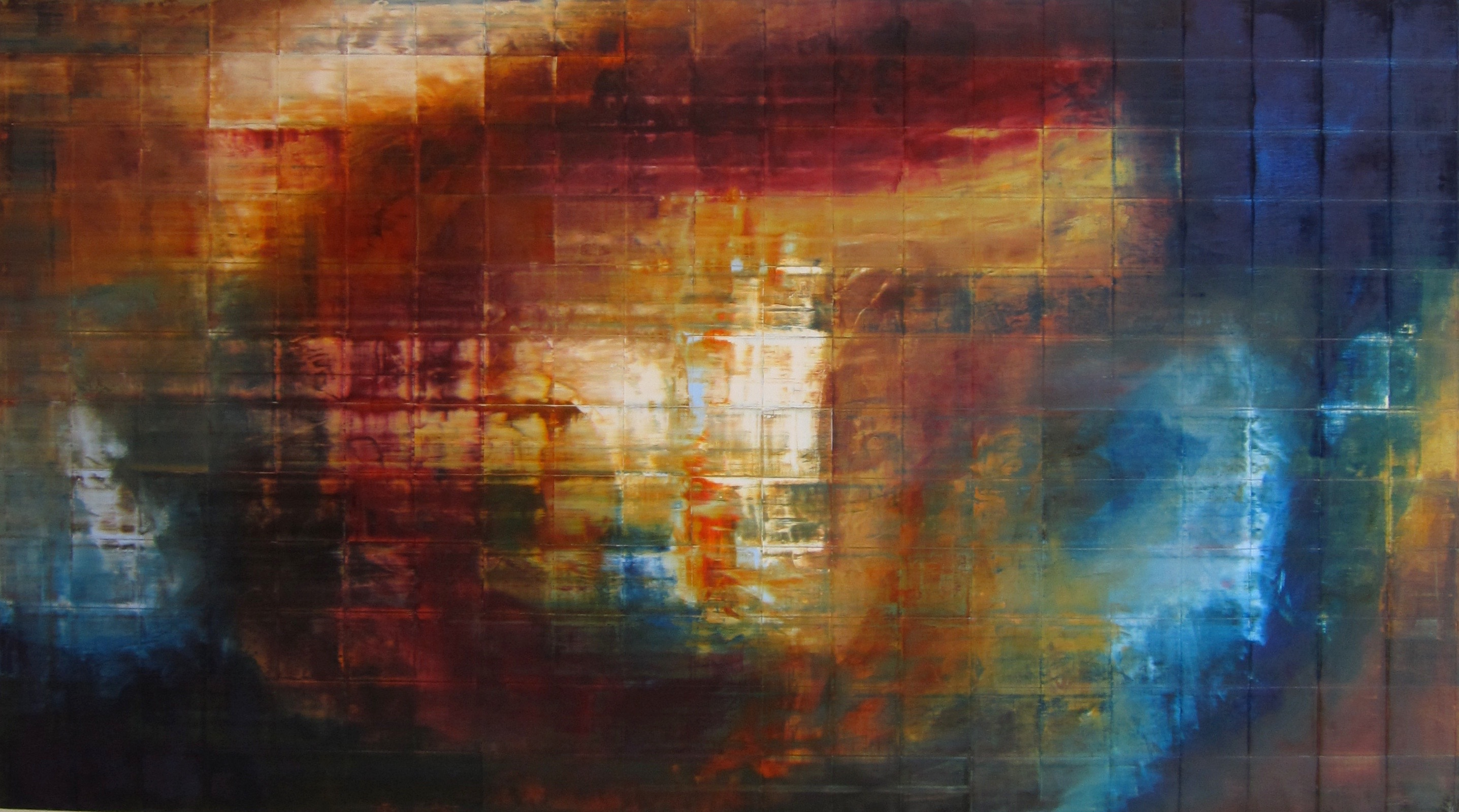
Another Reason (2014)

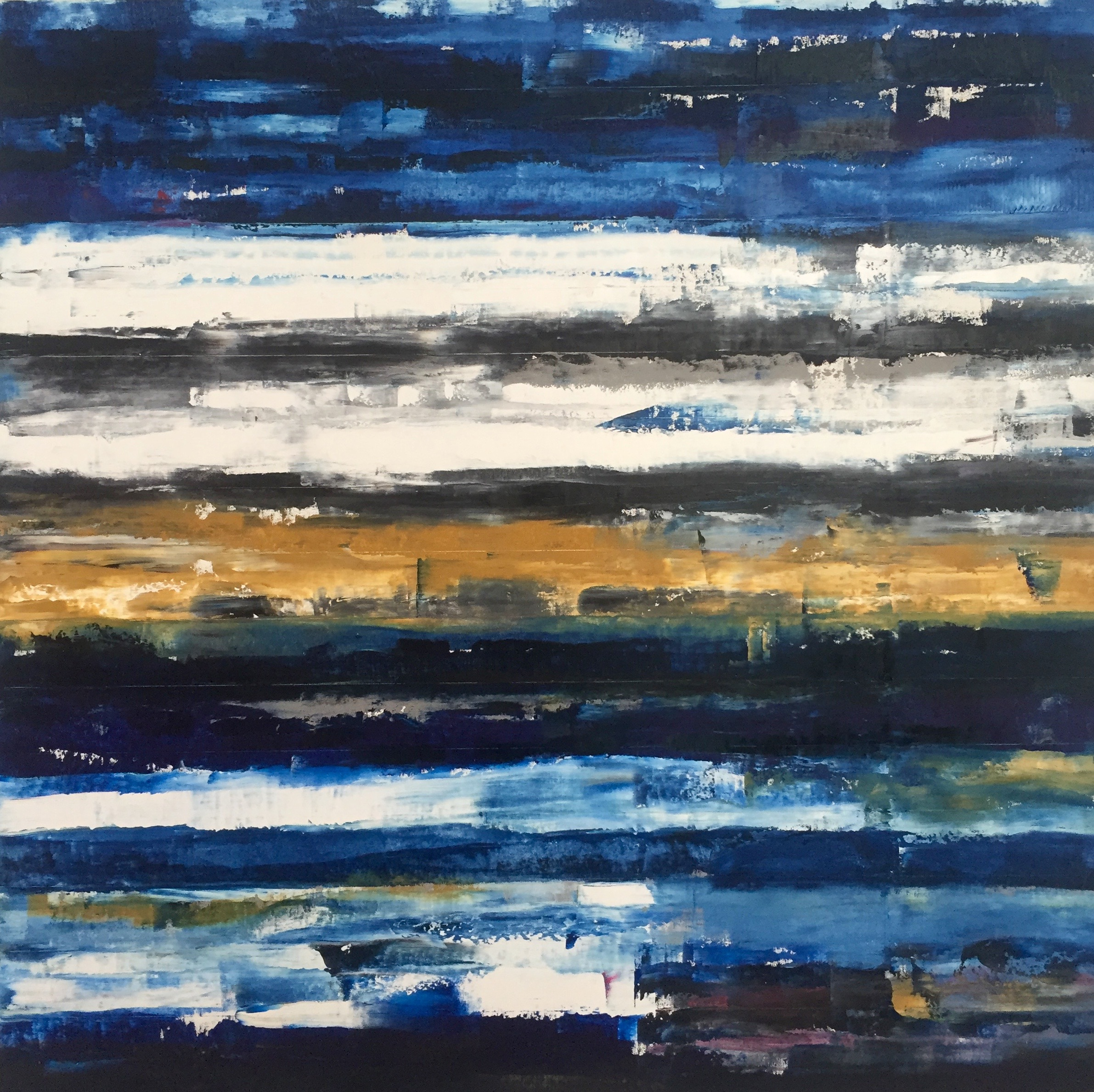
Tiny Buddha (2016)

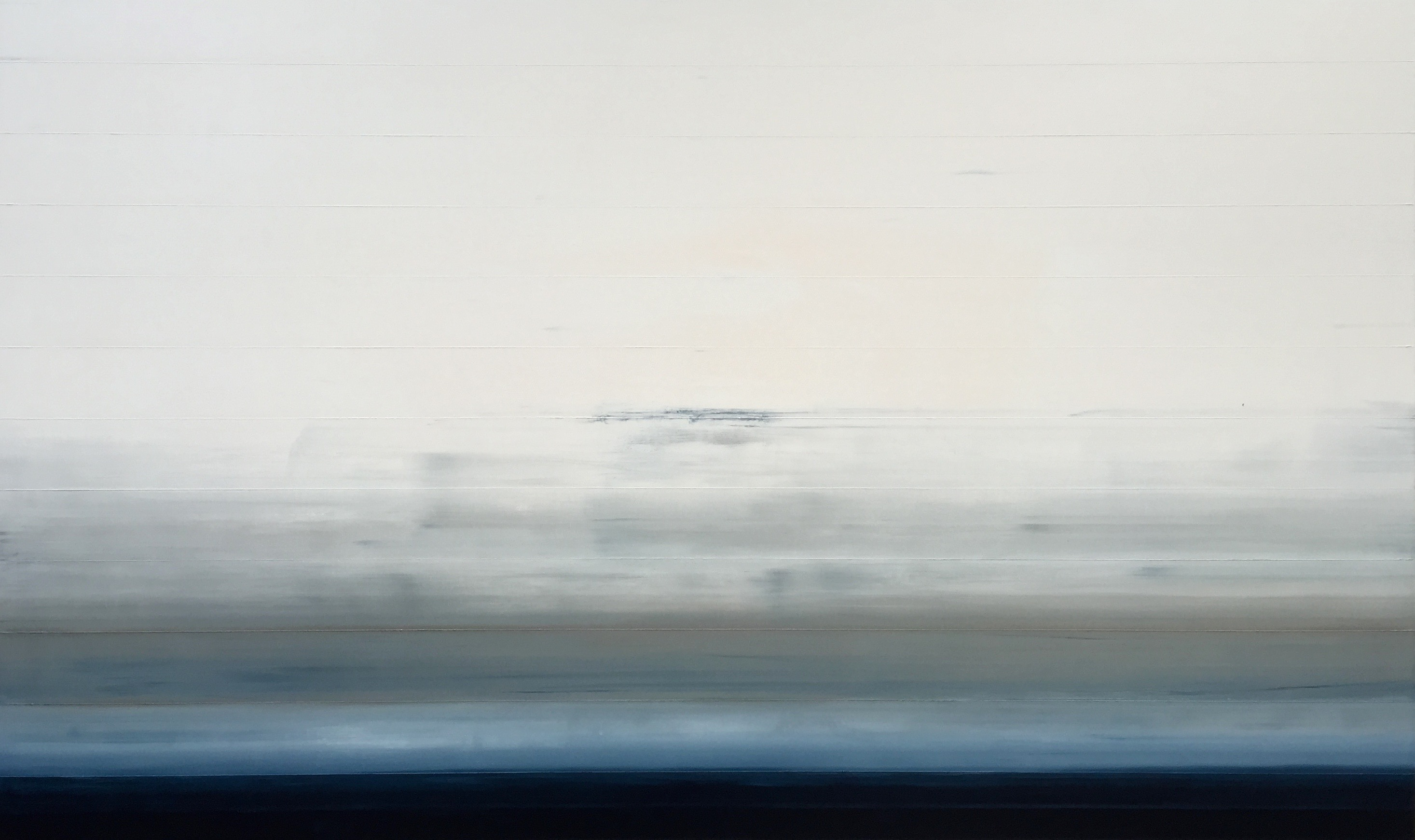
Fallout (2015)

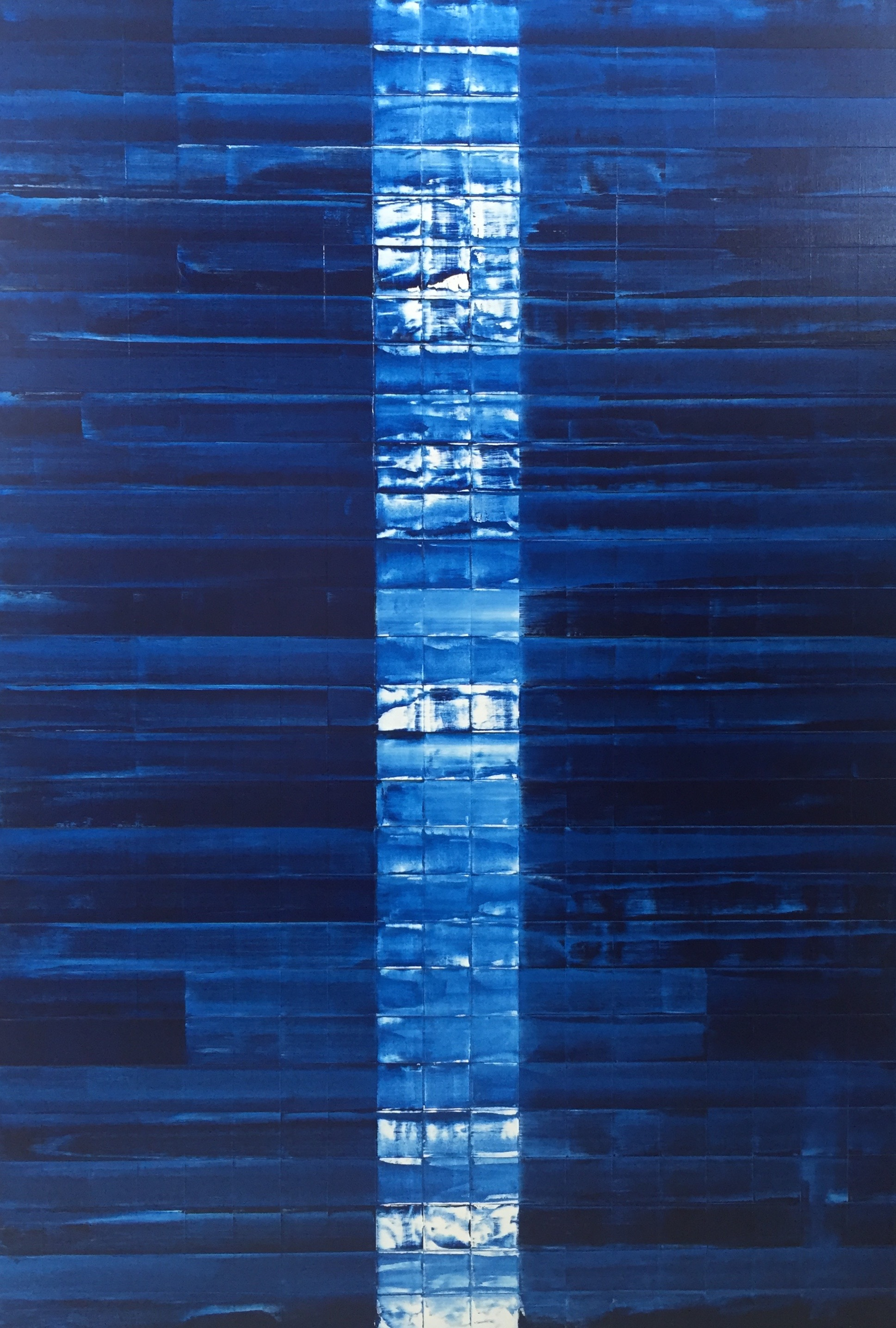
People Throw Rocks (2016)

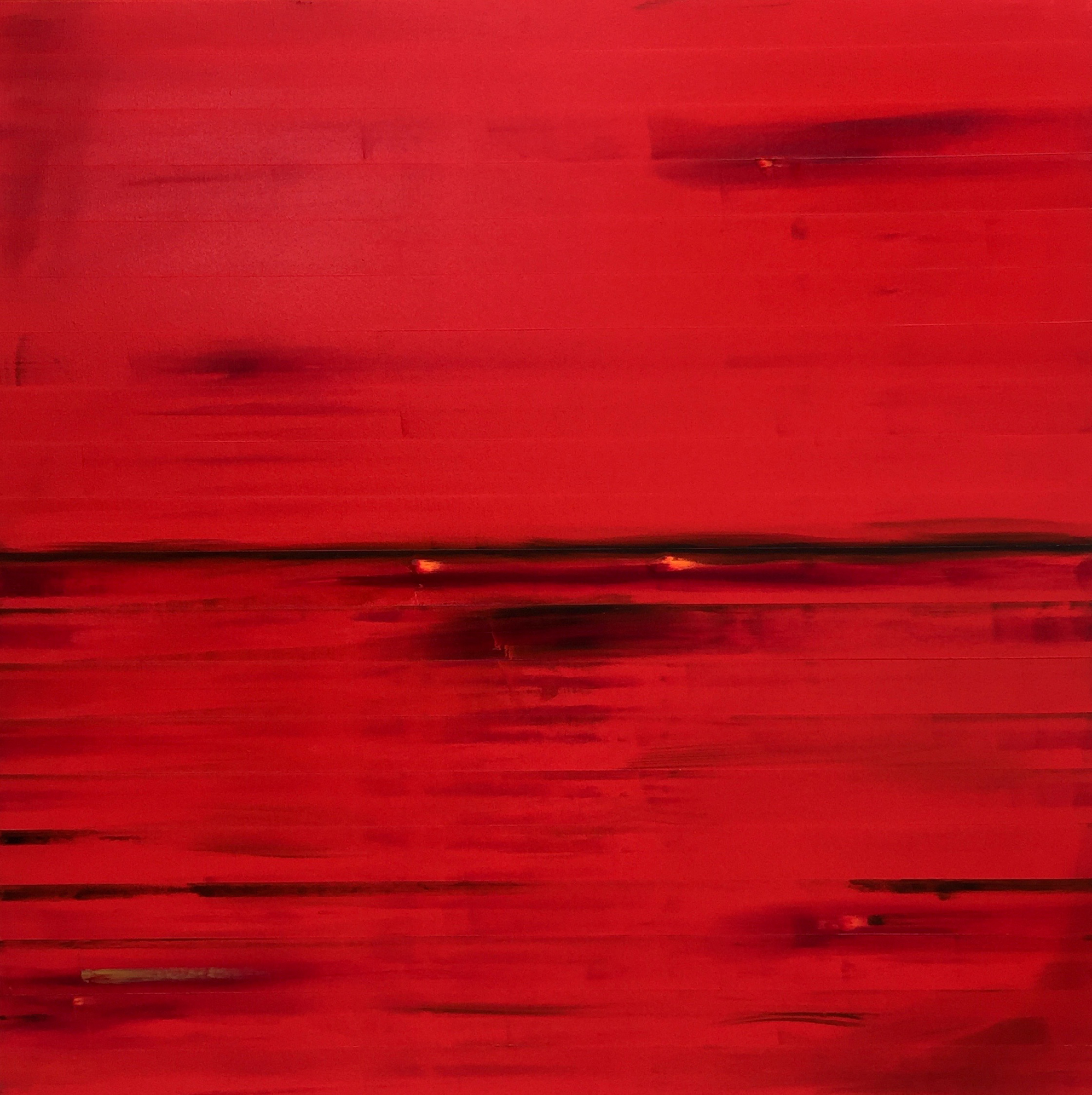
Creating Mischief (2016)

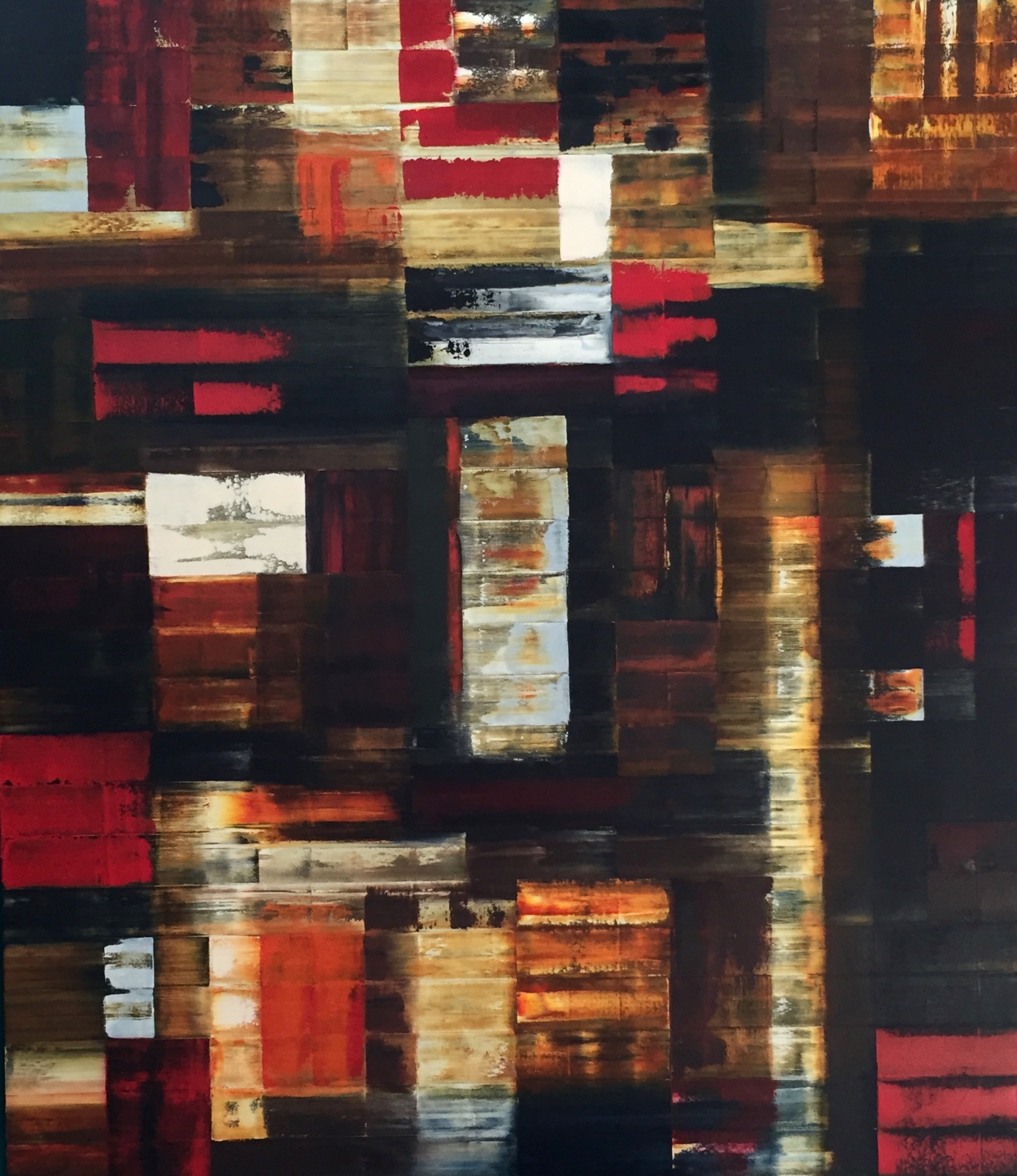
Counting on Forever (2016)

== Works in public collections (selection) ==
- Museo Pio Monte della Misericordia, Napels
- MAUI Museum, Teano
- Contemporary Art Museum (CAM), Naples
- The Ritz-Carlton, Los Angeles
- SunAmerica Center, Century City, Los Angeles

== Honors and awards ==
- 2019 Pollock-Krasner Foundation - Pollock Prize for Creativity, New York
- 2015 Bluduemila Associazione Sport & Arte – Best Foreign Artist, Naples, Italy
- 2010 Pollock-Krasner Foundation – Award Grant, New York
- 2010 ART 1307 Istituzione Culturale – Artistic Merit Award, Naples, Italy
- 2010 Artslant International – Abstract Showcase Award Winner
- 2007 Curators Choice Award "Spectrum" – micromuseum, New York

== Bibliography ==
- 2015 Roberta Andolfo: How far can music and painting touch each other? In: ilpickwick dated December 1, 2015
- 2015 Nicolas Marlin and Sara Lee Burd: Todd Williamson Creates Zone of Tranquility at the Rymer, in: The Huffington Post dated April 20th, 2015
- 2015 Il Mattino: Napoli: To See the Music, To Listen to Color, November 26, 2015
- 2015 Todd Williamson, Polifonia di un Paesaggio: a Villa di Donato la pittura si ascolta, in: RACNA-Magazine dated November 21st, 2015
- 2014 Nicolas Marlin and Cynthia Penna: Pas de Deux, in: The Huffington Post dated November 10th. 2014
- 2012 Emanuele Leone Emblema: Williamson: Napoli è la luce, in: Il Denaro dated April 21st, 2012
