= Michelangelo Pistoletto =

Italian artist, painter and sculptor

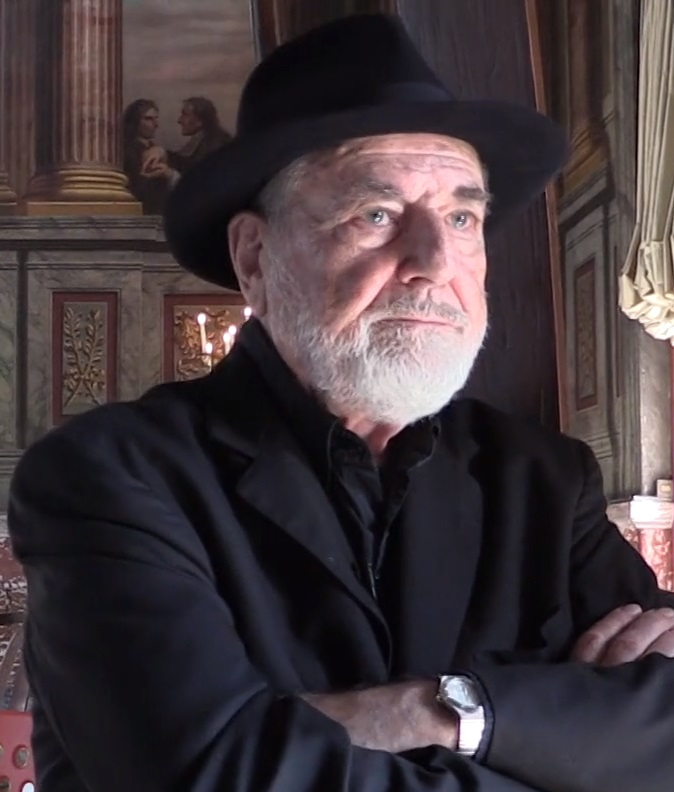
- Michelangelo Pistoletto, Blenheim Palace, September 2016.
- Born: 23 June 1933 (age 93); Biella, Italy
- Style: Action and object artist
- Awards: Praemium Imperiale (2013)

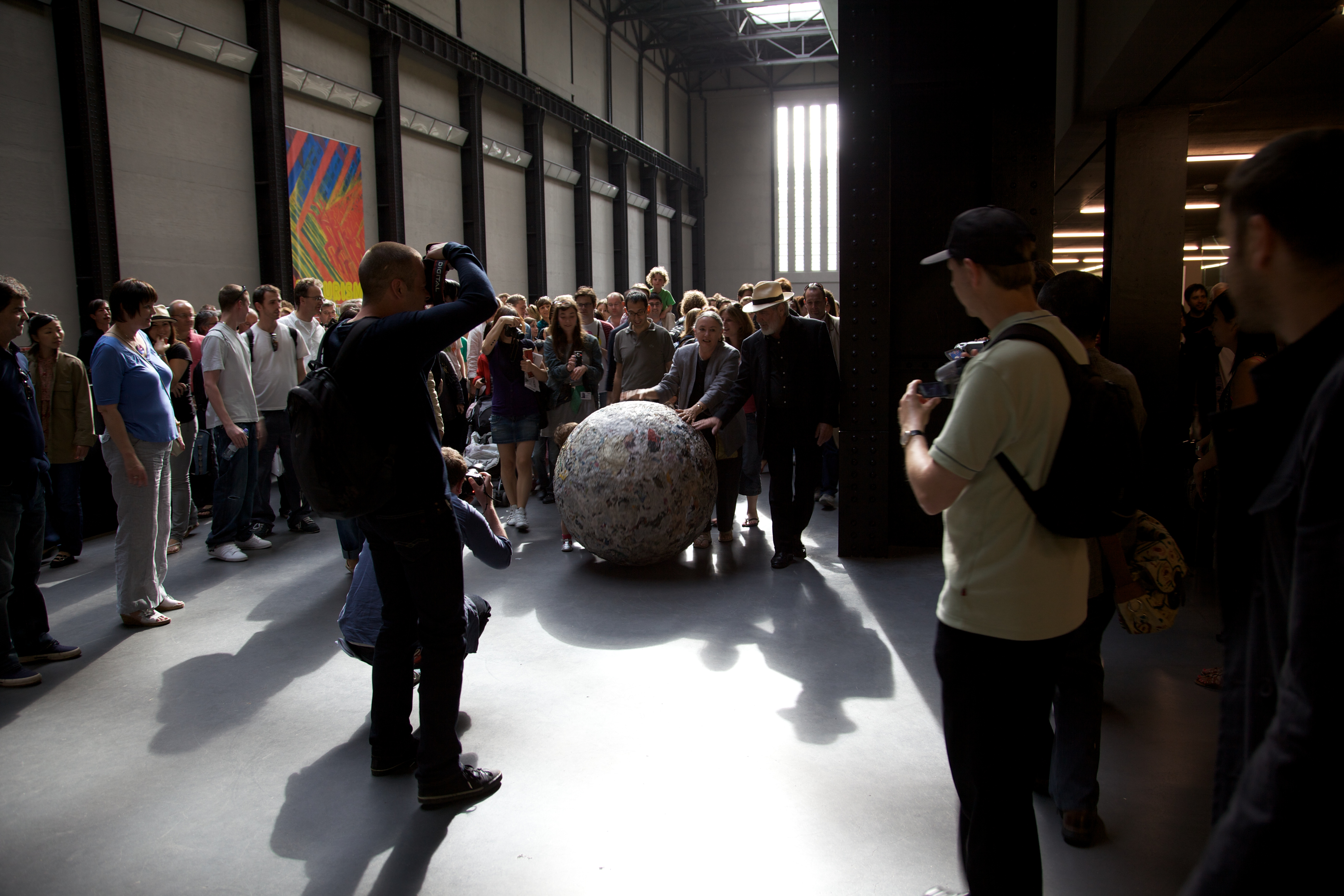
Michelangelo Pistoletto rolls a giant ball of newspapers through London streets on 23 May 2009.

Michelangelo Pistoletto (born 23 June 1933) is an Italian painter, action and object artist, and art theorist. Pistoletto is acknowledged as one of the main representatives of the Italian Arte Povera. His work mainly deals with the subject matter of reflection (especially in his Mirror Paintings) and the unification of art and everyday life in terms of a Gesamtkunstwerk.

== Biography ==
From 1947 until 1958, Pistoletto worked in his father's restoration workshop in Turin. In the 1950s, he started painting figurative works and self-portraits. In 1959, he participated in the Biennale di San Marino. In the following year, he had his first solo exhibition in the Galleria Galatea in Turin. In the beginning of the 1960s, Pistoletto started painting figurative works and self-portraits which he painted on a monochrome, metallic background. Later on, he combined painting with photography using collage techniques on reflective backgrounds. Eventually, he switched over to printing photorealistic scenes on steel plates polished to a high finish. He did that using the screen-printing method which made the observer almost completely melt in with what was depicted. In the mid-1960s, gallery owner Ileana Sonnabend brought him into contact with an international audience.

In 1965/1966, he produced the series of works Oggetti in meno (Minus Objects), which belongs to Pistoletto's early sculptural works. In 1966, Pistoletto had his first solo exhibition in the US, at the Walker Art Center in Minneapolis. In 1967, his work was awarded first prize in the Biennale de São Paulo. In the same year, Pistoletto started focusing on performance, video art and theatre. He founded an action art group, called "Zoo Group", which gave several performances between 1968 and 1970. These took place in the studio, public buildings or on the streets of Turin or other large cities. As was already the case with Pistoletto's 2-dimensional and sculptural works, the aim was to display the unity of art and everyday life.

=== Arte Povera ===
Michelangelo Pistoletto began painting on mirrors in 1962, connecting painting with the constantly changing realities in which the work finds itself. In the later 1960s, he began bringing together rags with casts of omnipresent classical statuary of Italy to break down the hierarchies of "art" and common things. An art of impoverished materials is certainly one aspect of the definition of Arte Povera. In his 1967 Muretto di stracci (Rag Wall) Pistoletto makes an exotic and opulent tapestry wrapping common bricks in discarded scraps of fabric. The work received a lot of feedback: Pistoletto, who started under the American influence of "post-pop art" and photorealism, was soon listed by gallery owners and critics in the catalogues as a significant representative of the novel, mostly Italian trend of the Arte Povera. Against the background of the 1968 student riots, Pistoletto withdrew his participation in the Venice Biennale. In the following years, he dealt with conceptual ideas, which he presented in the book L'uomo nero (1970). In 1974, he nearly completely withdrew from the art scene: he took an exam as a skiing instructor and spent most of his time in the mountains of San Sicario. At the end of the 1970s, he produced sculptures, heads, and torsos using polyurethane and marble. In doing so, he was a recipient of antique artifacts and he furthermore pursued other performance and theatre projects–including those in the US in Athens, Atlanta, and San Francisco. At the beginning of the 1980s, he presented theatre works, such as Anno Uno (March 1981) in the Teatro Quirino in Rome. Since 1990, Pistoletto has been living and working in Turin.

=== Cittadelarte – Fondazione Pistoletto ===
In 1994, Michelangelo Pistoletto proclaimed his programme Progetto Arte, the aim of which was the creative and social economic unification of all parts of human existence; in a narrower sense, the systematic combination of all achievements and knowledge of civilisation with aspects of art (e.g. fashion, theatre, design, etc.). In 1996, he founded the art city Cittadelarte – Fondazione Pistoletto in an abandoned textile factory near Biella, as a centre and "laboratory", supporting and researching creative resources, and producing innovative ideas and possibilities. The Cittadelarte is divided into different Uffici/Offices (work, education, communications, art, nutrition, politics, spirituality, and economics), which exchange with each other within an intermedial network. Although it is conceived as a closed system, transparency towards the outside world is an important aspect of the Cittadelarte.

=== Mirror Paintings ===
Pistoletto's Mirror Paintings are artworks made of human size mirrors. Using these mirrors as basic material, he paints figures or prints photographic images on them. The first Mirror Paintings were created in the early sixties. The printed subjects show a broad spectrum of motives: for example self-portraits, pictures from gallery visitors or objects of daily life.

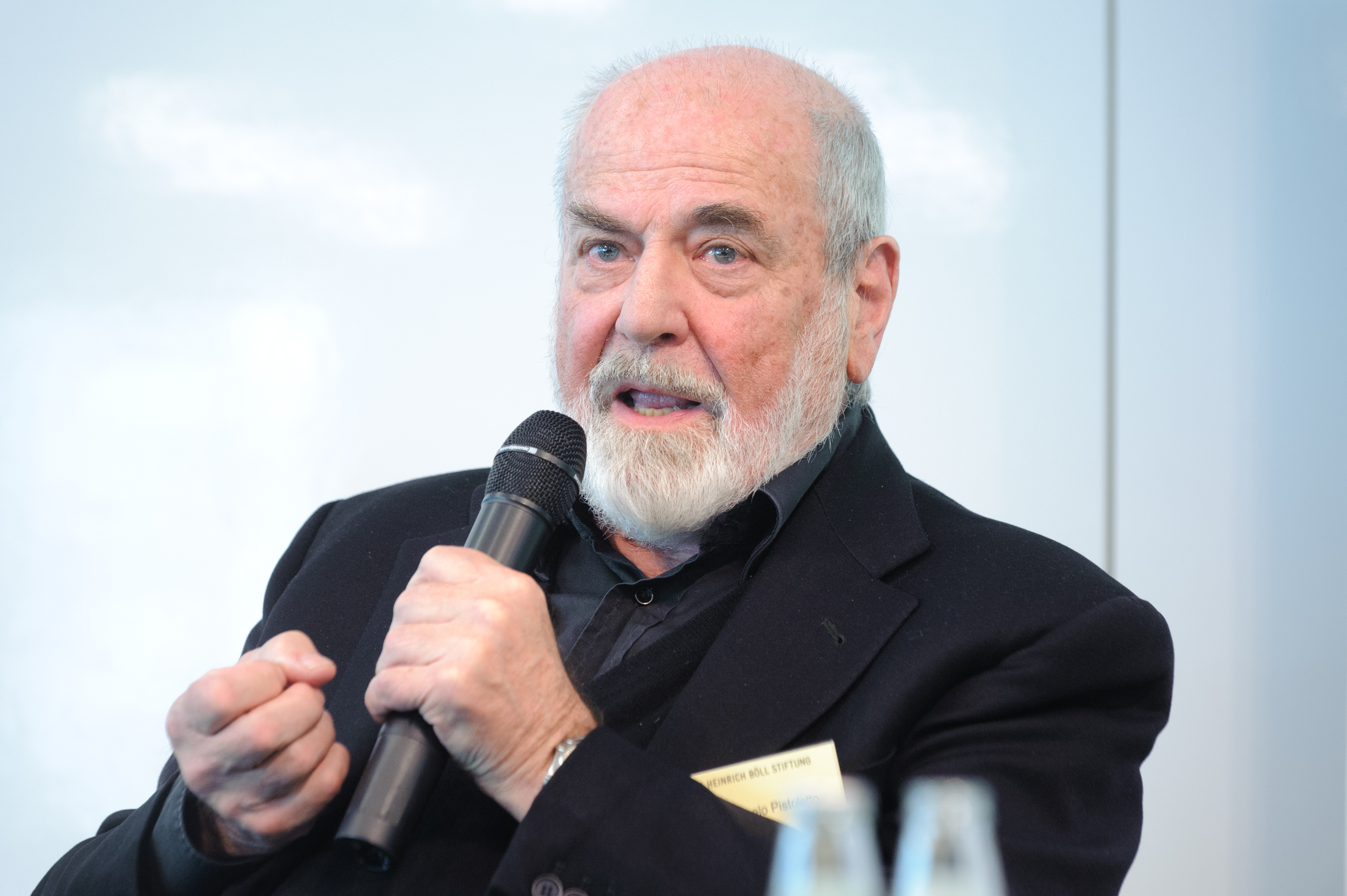
Michelangelo Pistoletto in 2012

Pistoletto intentionally uses the reflective properties of the steel to produce an interactive dialogue between the viewer and the image in front of them. From an interview in 1963 Pistoletto states the relationship between the viewer, the painting, and the virtual space as "the joining of couples of opposite polarity between the photographic image and what goes on in the virtual space generated by the reflecting surface ..." A central role is given to the spectator. His mirrored picture seems to get in interaction with the printed motive. In some way the viewer becomes part of the artwork. This phenomenon is relevant especially in time of European Student activism. Every individual spectator becomes active while regarding the artwork. This central position of the visitors could motivate them to become active also in other parts of society, which matches the ideas of the Gesamtkunstwerk.

Pistoletto is quoted saying, "In my mirror-paintings the dynamic reflection does not create a place, because it only reflects a place which already exists- the static silhouette does no more than re-propose an already existing place. But I can create a place by bringing about a passage between the photograph and the mirror: this place is whole time."

The previous quote enlightens the reader on Pistoletto's attempt to, in 1964 at the Galleria Sperone, work on bringing the meaning of the mirror out into the inhabited space surrounding it. The simultaneous representation of traditional dimensions and of reality in motion reveals the new dimensions of the mirror-paintings. Sometimes the paintings on the mirrors are portraits of Pistoletto's friends, patrons and/or self-portraits: this is true for the artist's recent entirely mirrored-hall at the Ristorante del Cambio, Piazza Carignano, Turin.

=== 1980s–1990s ===
Michelangelo Pistoletto's art was prominently featured in major international exhibitions, including Documenta 7 and 9 in Kassel (1982 and 1992), as well as the Venice Biennales of 1984, 1986, and 1993.

=== 2000s–2020s ===
Pistoletto received the Leone d'Oro for lifetime achievement at the 2003 Venice Biennale. In 2007, he was awarded the prestigious Wolf Foundation Prize in Jerusalem, acknowledging his extensive contributions to the art world. In 2000, the Museu d'Art Contemporani de Barcelona held a retrospective of his work. In 2005, he exhibited alongside Agnès Varda and Éric Sandillon.

In 2010, another major retrospective was slated at the Philadelphia Museum of Art.

== Selected works ==
- 1976/92: Scaffale (Bookcase) – metal and enamel, various realisations, Tate Gallery
- 1962/82: Uomo in piedi (Standing Man) – serigraphy on polished steel, Tate Gallery
- 1967/74: Venere degli stracci (Venus of the Rags) – sculpture and textiles, Tate Gallery
- 1965/66: Oggetti in meno (Minus Objects) – various objects, Guggenheim Museum
- 1968: Orchestra di stracci – Quartetto – various objects, Museo di arte moderna e contemporanea di Trento e Rovereto
- 1997: L'ala die Krems. (The Wing of Krems), Krems an der Donau
- La mela reintegrata

== Artist books ==
- Le Miroir comme Tableau, 23 x 23 x 1,5 cm. Limited edition of 120 copies and 15 copies not for sale and 10 artist's proofs / Michelangelo Pistoletto and 5 artist's proofs / Jacques Meuris. Numbered and signed by Michelangelo Pistoletto and Jacques Meuris. Produced and published in 1993 by les Maîtres de Forme Contemporains (mfc-michèle didier) and M. & L. Durand-Dessert.

== Bibliography ==
- Der schwarze Mann. Die unerträgliche Seite. Transl. into German by Johannes Schlebrügge, Pakesch und Schlebrügge, Vienna 1997, ISBN 3-85160-004-5
- Michelangelo Pistoletto. Actar, 2000, ISBN 84-95273-28-4
