= Marcia Grostein =

Brazilian-American artist (born c.1949)

Marcia Grostein (born c. 1949) Marcia Grostein is a Brazilian-American artist known for using various mediums across public art, sculpture, painting, video art, photography, and portable wearable art/jewelry. She was the first contemporary Brazilian artist to be acquired by the Metropolitan Museum of Art for the 20th Century Collection by the curator Lowery Sims.

Interestingly, her public art works of Sky Drawings reflect the elongated necks of Modigliani. As a child she used to copy those necks sitting and watching her aunt Mary Kuperman paint. Grostein's visually dynamic and expressive style began to unfold. The Wild Form describes Grostein's work as a “rare and enriching possibility to liberate and humanize analysis”.

== Biography ==
Marcia Grostein was born in Sāo Paulo, Brazil in 1949 and currently resides in New York. Her parents were of Jewish descent who immigrated to Brazil; her father was Polish and her mother was Russian. Grostein's family spread all around different parts of Latin America after WWI. She has exhibited her work worldwide. Her mentors include famous artists; among them– Abstract Expressionist painter Willem de Kooning and Pop Artist James Rosenquist. Her relationships to these artists, and many others, helped her find her own place in the art scene. As Marcia's influences also pulled from minimalism and conceptual art, she experimented with various mediums. Marcia works in sculpture, painting, video, photography, and portable art/jewelry. After finishing her studies at the Royal College of Art in London in 1970, she returned to Brazil to enroll at Escola de Experimentação Artística Brasil Dois Pontos (Escola Brasil Two Dots), a center for artistic experimentation where Grostein developed her interest for American Art. In 1972, the precocious 23-year old had her first one-woman show of papier mache animals at the Inter-Design Gallery in São Paulo. In 1979 she interned for Fluxus artist Joseph Beuys at his retrospective held at the Guggenheim Museum in NYC. The following year, Grostein was represented by Betty Parsons Gallery–the site of many original Abstract Expressionists events of the 1950s. Her paintings were co-exhibited with Jackson Pollock's works in the gallery's final show. With a background in dance, Grostein's work is composed with meticulous attention to the physical qualities of her chosen medium. She creates dynamic visual choreographies that are both reductive and expressive at once. The most interesting thing about Grostein's work in the late 70's and early 80's was her response to the sexist imagery captured by Picasso and de Kooning. Her paintings made “points about the relations between men and women” with opposing themes of liberation and oppression. Her sculptures can be understood in anthropomorphic terms. In the 94’ International São Paulo Bienal invoked the Wagnerian Gesamtkunstwerk, work of art as it involved all media genres fusing design, performance, painting and sculpture.

The artist has exhibited her work widely at renowned museums and galleries in the United States, Europe, Latin America, and Asia. Pieces from her prolific body of work are held in prominent public and private collections including those of the São Paulo Museum of Art, the Museum of Modern Art in Rio de Janeiro, MoMA PS1, and The Metropolitan Museum of Art, among others.

https://hutchinsonmodern.com/publications/70/

== Education ==
Grostein studied in Sāo Paulo at IADE the Institute Design, Technology, and Communication (1963–1966) and continued at the Royal Academy of Art in London (1969–1970).

== Artwork ==
=== The Sacred Garden of Eve (1989) ===
Colorful painting under the Sacred Garden collection (37" x 72")

Description: A four-piece of colorful artwork of a garden curled up in different layers of color starting with circled flowers in the bottom to green grass at the top with a type of peacock in the middle. This artwork was based on a series Grostein had done based on imaginary gardens; she expressed all of this in another artwork named The Sacred Garden of Adam. This art series was based on oil paintings depicting these sacred gardens which are meant to be interpreted by the viewer. The painting is currently held in the collections of the Metropolitan Museum of Art in New York City.

=== The Sacred Garden of Adam (1988) ===
Oil on canvas under the Sacred Garden collection (78" x 60")

Description: The exhibit opens with “The Sacred Gardens,” more specifically with “The Sacred Garden of Adam,” of 1988 (we still do not know if it will be able to leave the Metropolitan Museum in New York). In it are synthesized three central entities: land, man and sea, where the emblematic figure of the monkey, a primordial animal, merges with the solidarity image of the artist at the center of her exterior and interior life, in the face of four possibilities of movement and of choice, but at the mercy of her own destiny, There virtuality is a plunge into the waters of time, a leap toward the trees and the flowers of the day, a walk to obscure lands of twisted tropical night vines and finally, rest in contemplation of the landscape. The invisible diagram which holds up the canvas is a mandala, an image of the world with the four cardinal points. In one way or another all the works in “The Sacred Garden” have this quality and it is for this reason that it is at the beginning of the mysteries of the journey. The monkey represents Adam. Grostein's evocation of Eden is no mere biblical allegory. Darwin has invaded the scene in the person of the monkey, an alleged evolutionary ancestor of humankind. And Freud haunts the symbolism of the flower as representing the first bloom of female sexuality which lies in wait, ready for the picking/fulfillment.

=== 'They.Went.For.A.Swim' ===
Large High Sculpture Description: A sculpture taken on the beach and is a tall black and brown rustic circle. This was a series depicted on the beach with many different sculptures Grostein had made and photographed. In this series she had three different sculptures, and it was shown in many different views based on the photographs. Some of these sculptures had wave-like features as well as some of the other art was portrayed as the coral of the ocean.

=== Portable Art ===
Part of the jewelry collection Description: A piece of jewelry around the neck with a silver metal band and two clear plastic-like ornaments at the end with a small gold band at the end. This gives a description of art is found in everything and is shown with the different shapes along the jewelry.

=== Alice in Wonderland ===
Description: This piece is one of Grostein's photography photos of a young woman dancing ballet on a stage with an ankle-length pink fluffy dress. She has her back turned around with her body tilted a little and a spotlight shining on her with a water-like background. This artwork is part of series of a dance performance from a young woman dancing and showing her different stance of each move and photograph shown. The photographs have a very depicted view of the dancer with the dim lights shown to portray her focus on the artist themselves during her performance.

=== Sky drawings: sǎo paulo biennial ===
Large String-Like Shapes. Description: This is a set of artwork of long different shaped metal strips reaching the sky and the photographs are angled towards the sky. This angled shows the shapes angled all above the sky and bringing the sky drawing to life. Sky Drawings was an artwork series depicted on many different countries in showing strips of art in the sky. This artwork was shown as a public form of art showing the nature from the background of these different countries. The art was merely similar, but the scenery was shown to give it more meaning depending on the time of day as well as the locations of where this series took place.

== Exhibitions ==
2021 Photography exhibition, Heritage Brazil, Southampton NY

2019 Brighton Beach Project, NAC National Academy of Art, New York, New York

2019 Luce del Pensiero, Projetto Guzzini, curated by Lucrezia de Domizio Durini, Milano, Italy

2018 Desver a Arte, Galeria Kogan Amaro, São Paulo, Brazil

2018 O Tridimencional na Coleção Marcos Amaro, Fundação Marcos Amaro, São Paulo, Brazil

2017 Still Moment, Museum of Contemporary Art Sorocaba, Sorocaba, Brazil

2016 Biennale Arte & Industria Labin, Istria, Croatia

2015 FORUM 5, Bolognano, Italy

2015 Mykonos Biennale, Mykonos, Greece

2014 Gilded Holiday, Paul Kasmin Gallery, New York, New York

2014 Light Shop, Paul Kasmin Gallery, ABMB Miami

2014 Functional Sculpture, DDC, New York, New York

2013 Choreography, Museum of Contemporary Art Sorocaba, Sorocaba, Brazil

2013 FIVAC (5th International Video Art Festival), Camagüey, Cuba

2012 Saint Sebastian from Renaissance to the Present, Edelman Arts, New York, New York, and Miami, Florida

2012 Moss: Dialogues between Art and Design, Philips de Pury, New York, New York

2010 Cacophony, Zone: Contemporary Art, New York, New York

2010 Festival Internacional de Video Arte, Quito, Ecuador

2010 Disciplined + Spontaneity, Zone: Contemporary Art, New York, New York

2009 Public Art Installation, Holotopia Academy, Amalfi Coast, Italy

2009 Video Abierto, Reina Sophia Museum, Murcia, Spain

2009 X Bienal de Cuenca, Cuenca, Ecuador

2009 Crossing Borders, Bjorn Ressle Gallery, New York, New York

2008 Winter Salon: Works on Paper, Bjorn Ressle Gallery, New York, New York

2008 Pinta, Leon Tovar Gallery, New York, New York

2008 It's Not Easy, Exit Art, New York, New York

2008 Diva: Media Art, Bjorn Ressle Gallery, New York, New York

2008 Informed by Function, Lehman College Art Gallery, New York, New York

2008 The Arts in Cyberspace and Public Space on Seven Continents, Streaming Museum, Melbourne, Australia

2007 Auto-Retrato do Brasil, Paço Imperial, Rio de Janeiro, Brazil

2007 CHROMA 9 Audio Visual Festival, Guadalajara, Mexico

2007 Jewelry from Picasso to Kenny Scharff, Neuhoff Edelman Gallery, New York, New York

2007 PAM @ CAM: Perpetual Art Machine, Chelsea Art Museum, New York, New York

2006 Brazilian Artists, Espasso, New York, New York

2006 Food Show: The Hungry Eye, Chelsea Art Museum, New York, New York

2006 Transparencias, Galeria Eduardo H. Fernandes, São Paulo, Brazil

2006 Codes of Culture: Video Art from 7 Continents, White Cube, Buenos Aires Argentina

2005 Video Performance in Collaboration with Irving Raygoza, Guadalajara, Mexico

2005 Curious and Furious, Vernon Gallery, Prague, Czech Republic

2005 Where Fashion Meets Art, Issey Miyake, New York

2005 Guess Who's Coming to Dinner, Remy Toledo Gallery, New York, New York

2005 Women, Anita Friedman Gallery, New York, New York

2004 Paris Underground Film Festival Piff 2nd Edition, Paris, France

2004 Arte Contemporanea Brasileira nas Coleções do Museu de Arte Moderna, Museu de Arte Moderna, Rio de Janeiro Brazil

2004 Surveille Sortie, Magnetic Laboratorium, Volume, Brooklyn, New York

2003 Public Art Piece for Corredor Berrini, São Paulo, Brazil

2003 SX Street: A New Event, Collaboration with Magnetic Laboratorium, New York,

2002 Art for Play, Playground for Projeto Anchieta, São Paulo, Brazil

2000 Still Moment, Paulina Kolczinska Fine Art, New York, New York

1999 Sky Drawing Sculpture, Site Santa Fe, Santa Fe, New Mexico

1999 II Biennial Mercosul, Porto Alegre, Brazil

1999 Museum at Open Sky, Berrine Corredor, São Paulo, Brazil

1999 Drawings, Baltic Gallery, Warsaw, Poland

1998 Feminine Plural, Museo de Bellas Artes, Buenos Aires, Argentina

1998 Gay McIntyre Gallery, New York

1996 Utopia, Museu Casa das Rosas, São Paulo, Brazil

1996 By the Sea, Fatohui Cramer Gallery, East Hampton, New York

1996 The Sculpture Center, New York, New York

1995 Integration/ Disintegration, Dahn Gallery, New York, New York

1994 The Wild Form: 20 Year Survey, Museu de Arte de São Paulo, São Paulo, Brazil, and Museu de Arte Moderna, Rio de Janeiro, Brazil (1995)

1994 Galeria de Arte Raquel Arnaud, São Paulo, Brazil

1994 XXII Bienal International de São Paulo, São Paulo, Brazil

1994 Small Formats in Latin America, Luigi Marrozini Gallery, San Juan, Puerto Rico

1993 Brazil: Images of the 80s and 90s, Museum of the Americas, Washington DC

1993 Sergio Fadel Collection, Museu Belas Artes, Rio de Janeiro, Brazil

1993 Retratos e Autoretratos, na coleção de Gilberto Chateaubriand- Museu de Arte Moderna, Rio de Janeiro, Brazil

1993 Lingua Latina est Regina, Stux Gallery, New York, New York

1993 Primavera Cultural, Galeria de Arte Raquel Arnaud, São Paulo, Brazil

1991 Body and Soul, Philippe Staib Gallery, New York, New York

1991 Sacred Garden, Museo de Arte Americano de Maldonado, Punta del Este, Uruguay

1991 Chair Installation, Tilden-Foley Gallery, New Orleans, Louisiana

1990 A Cor na Arte Brasileira, Museu da Imagem e do Som de São Paulo, São Paulo, Brazil

1989 Birds into the Night, Tilden-Foley Gallery, New Orleans, Louisiana

1989 Tropical Rain Forest, curated by Lucy Lippard, Lowery Sims, and Steven Westfall New York, New York

1989 Don't Bungle the Jungle, Tony Shafrazi Gallery, New York, New York

1988 Homage to Balanchine: Chair Sculpture Installation, Nadia Bassanese Studio D’Arte Gallery, Trieste, Italy

1988 Birds into the Night, Venice Biennial, Academia and Museu Dicesano di Sant Apollonia, Venice, Italy

1987 Latin American Artists in New York Since 1970, Blanton Museum of art, University of Texas, Austin, Texas

1987 Art against AIDS, Jason McCoy Gallery, New York, New York

1987 XIX Bienal International de São Paulo, São Paulo, Brazil

1986 Three Artists, Jason McCoy Gallery, New York, New York

1986 II Biennial de Havana, Havana, Cuba

1985 Today's Art of Brazil, Hara Museum of Contemporary Art, Tokyo, Japan

1984 I Biennial de Havana, Havana, Cuba

1984 Contemporary Latin American Artists, The Chrysler Museum, Norfolk, Virginia

1984 New Forms of Figuration, Americas Society, New York, New York

1984 East Village Art in Berlin: Romance and Catastrophe, Zellermayer Gallery, Berlin, Germany

1984 Sex, Cable Gallery, New York, New York

1984 A More Store, Jack Tilton Gallery, New York, New York

1984 Winter Group Show, Betty Parsons Gallery, New York, New York

1984 New Talent, Bonlow Gallery, New York, New York

1983 Grandes Telas, Galeria São Paulo, São Paulo, Brazil

1983 Recent Paintings, Betty Parsons, New York, New York

1983 Homage to Betty Parsons: Marcia Grostein and Jackson Pollock, Betty Parsons Gallery, New York

1983 Women of the Americas: Emerging Perspectives, Americas Society, New York, New York

1982 Betty Parsons Gallery, New York, New York

1982 Installation/set for William Dunas choreography, MoMA/P.S.1, New York, New York

- 1988: Academia and Museo Dioscano d'Arte Sacra (Venice, Italy)
- 1985: 19 Biennal (Sāo Paulo, Brazil) "7 Continents"
- 1983: Betty Parsons Gallery, (New York)
- 1981: Institute for Art and Urban Resources, P.S.1,

(L.I. City, New York)

Paulo Figueredo Gallery, (Sāo Paulo, Brazil)

Galeria (Sāo Paulo, Brazil)

- 1987: 19 Biennial (Sāo Paulo, Brazil)

Modern Art Museum, (Rio de Janeiro, Brazil): "Entre Dois Seculos"

Jason McCoy Gallery, (New York): "Art against Aids"

Museum of the University of Texas, Austin, Texas

- 1986: Cooper HewittMuseum and Barney's, New York: "The Establishment of the Statue of Liberty"

Second Cuban Biennial, Havana, Cuba

- 1981: Sutton Gallery, New York: "One of Each"

Landfall Gallery, Chicago: "Artists Chairs"

Sutton Gallery, New York, "Summer Selections"

- 1973: Brussel's Museum, Belgium: Brazilian Sculpture Exhibition

== Set design commissions ==
- 1982: Set Design for William Dunas production of "Paranarrative" by Borges, Institute for Art and Urban Resources, P.S.1, L.I.C., New York
- 1973: Set Design for the Sāo Paulo production of "Sleuth"
- 1972: Sculpture for the D.P.Z. Advertising Co. for the film "Rhodia" Cannes Film Festival prize

== Collections ==
Grostein's work is displayed in many art galleries around the country The Metropolitan Museum of Art in New York, Hara Museum of Contemporary Art in Tokyo, Museum of Modern Art in Rio de Janeiro, and also spread in other different galleries. She was the first Brazilian artist whose work was purchased from a high museum like the Metropolitan Museum.

== Awards ==
She was awarded a prize in 1972 at the Cannes Film Festival for the film Rodhia.
