= Rivolta Femminile =

Feminist group, created in Rome in 1970

The Rivolta Femminile ("Women's Revolt") refers to: the first female-only feminist group, created in Rome in 1970 with a meeting between Carla Lonzi, Carla Accardi, and Elvira Banotti; the manifesto they developed, which appeared on the walls of Rome in July 1970, is "The Manifesto of Female Revolt"; the "Women's Revolt" publishing house, founded in 1970 in Milan by Carla Lonzi, through it the writings of the group were published.

== The group ==
The creation of one of the first Italian feminist groups came from a meeting in Rome with Carla Lonzi, Carla Accardi and Elvira Banotti. They found that they were in full harmony with the feminist movement which was developing again with peculiar characteristics in many different countries. In the spring of 1970 their continuous intellectual exchanges led to the formation of the group of Female Revolt sanctioned by the publication, in July of the same year, of the Manifesto of Female Revolt. The group represented an avant-garde because it was able to intuit from the beginning the indispensability of certain practices such as separatism and self-awareness. The first underlined the distinctive character of the Manifesto: communication between women only; the second referred to the autonomy obtained in the private and public sectors, to relations between women, to listening to their personal experiences about daily life, including the personal and intimate sphere. In the same period in Italy other feminist groups arose, but contrary to these, the women's revolt group remained distant from the political movements of the left and from the youth movements in direct relationship with the Sessantotto. In many cities including Genoa, Florence, and Turin, small groups of Women's Revolt were formed. Theirs was a completely original experience. The publishing house "Women's Revolt" was able to gain total editorial and economic autonomy by the constant use of writing and publication of ideas that contributed to the feminist movement. After the foundation, the three founders took different paths.

== The manifesto of Rivolta Femminile ==
The Manifesto was posted on the walls of Rome in July 1970 and soon after also in Milan. Copies were also distributed in flyer format. It represented the constitutive act of one of the first Italian feminist groups. The Manifesto is a list of 65 points preceded by a quotation from Olympe de Gouges and included an overall analysis of the arguments that feminism would have made its own: the attestation and pride of difference against the claim of equality, the refusal of the complementarity of women in any area of life, the criticism of the institution of marriage, the recognition of women's work as productive work and, last but not least, the centrality of the body and the claim of a subjective sexuality free from male demands. The writing was aimed at women, urging them to free themselves from patriarchal culture not only in the family sphere, but also in the political and party sphere.

The need to pursue the principles of separatism and self-awareness was reaffirmed in March 1977 in the second manifesto, the Manifesto of Revolt - Io dico io, published as an introduction to the collection of writings by Marta Lonzi, Anna Jaquinta and Carla Lonzi entitled The Presence of Man in Feminism. The group took a new stance towards male culture, but above all towards the ambiguous attitudes of women who, despite being part of the movement, were unable to embrace the desired changes already expressed by feminism; specifically towards those who felt closer to the theories and male forms of struggle and not to personal experience linked to one's own sex.

== The publishing house ==
Also born in 1970 in Milan was the Writings of Female Revolt, the first Italian feminist publishing house. The first writings of the Women's Revolt saw the light at the end of 1970, with the Libretti verde di Rivolta (The Green Books of Revolt) series. Subsequently, the publishing plan split, giving life to another series, Prototipi. The first edited texts resulting from the practice of self-awareness, the second texts dealing with male culture.

=== Libretti verde di rivolta ===
They were small booklets (17x12 cm.) with a green cover, black characters and the group logo at the bottom. They aroused much interest as well for their sometimes explosive titles.

- 1970, Sputiamo su Hegel by Carla Lonzi. Reprinted: 1974, 1978, 1982 and 2013 (1970 cover)
- 1971, La donna clitoridea e la donna vaginale by Carla Lonzi. Reprinted: 1974, 1978, 1982 (1971 cover)
- 1971, Sessualità femminile e aborto by Elvira Banotti
- 1971, Assenza della donna dai momenti celebrativi della manifestazione creativa maschile by Carla Lonzi
- 1972, Superiore e inferiore: conversazioni fra le ragazzine delle Scuole Medie, edited by Carla Accardi (Cover)
- 1972, Significato dell'autocoscienza nei gruppi femministi by Carla Lonzi
- 1973, Una ragazza timida by Tuuli Tarina (Cover)
- 1975, Autocoscienza by Alice Martinelli (Cover)
- 1975, La strada più lunga di Maria Grazia Chinese. Reprinited: 1976 (1975 cover)
- 1977, È già politica by Maria Grazia Chinese, Carla Lonzi, Marta Lonzi, Anna Jaquinta (Cover)
- 1978, La presenza dell'uomo nel femminismo by Marta Lonzi, Carla Lonzi, Anna Jaquinta (Cover)
- 1978, Taci, anzi parla. Diario di una femminista by Carla Lonzi. Reprinted: 2010 (1978 cover)

=== Prototipi ===
- 1980, Vai pure: dialogo con Pietro Consagra by Carla Lonzi. Reprinted: 2011 (1980 cover)
- 1982, L'architetto fuori di sé by Marta Lonzi (Cover)
- 1985, Scacco ragionato: poesie dal '58 al '63 by Carla Lonzi (Cover)
- 1990, Vita di Carla Lonzi di Marta Lonzi, Anna Jaquinta
- 1992, Armande sono io!, by Carla Lonzi, posthumous publication edited by Marta Lonzi, Angela De Carlo, Maria Delfino (Copertina)
- 1998, Diana: una femminista a Buckingham Palace by Marta Lonzi

== Bibliography ==
1. Penny A. Weiss. “47. Female Revolt (Rivolta Femminile), ‘Manifesto.’’ Rome, Italy; July 1970.’” In Feminist Manifestos : A Global Documentary Reader . NYU Press, 2018.
2. Archivi, Biblioteche, Centri di documentazione delle donne, Rivolta Femminile, http://www.herstory.it/documenti-archivia
3. Libreria Delle Donne Di Milano, 2020, https://www.libreriadelledonne.it/categorie_libri/vetrina/.
4. "Rivolta Femminile", Wikipedia (in Italian), 2020-11-19
5. Sara Rattenni, Manifesto di Rivolta femminile: un'analisi, on https://www.academia.edu
