= Forma 1 =

Italian artistic group active 1947–1961

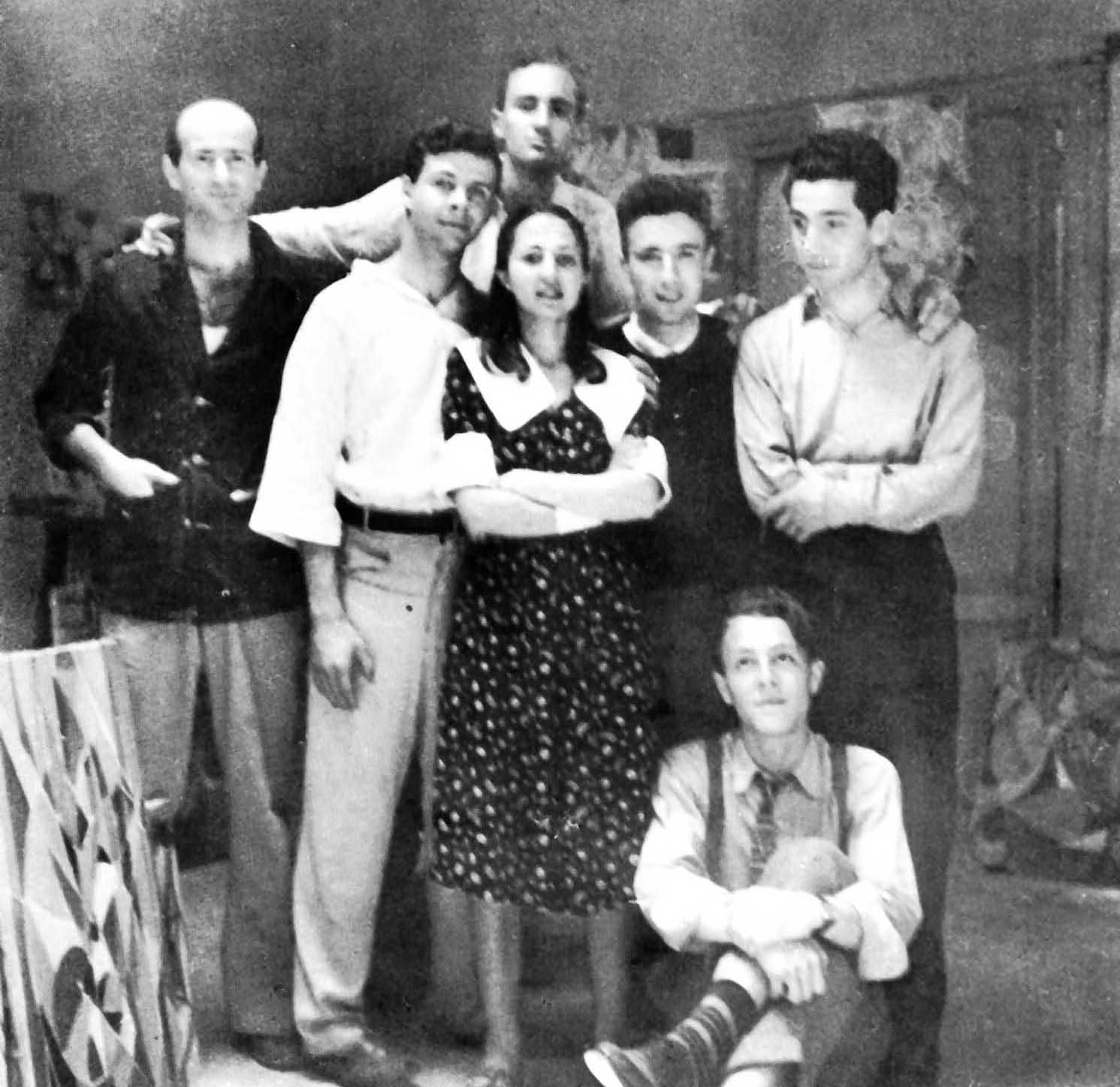
- The group photographed in Rome in 1947; Maugeri and Turcato are not shown
- Years active: 1947–1961
- Location: Italy
- Major figures: Carla Accardi; Ugo Attardi; Pietro Consagra; Piero Dorazio; Mino Guerrini; Concetto Maugeri; Achille Perilli; Antonio Sanfilippo; Giulio Turcato

Forma 1, or simply Forma, was a group or school of young Italian artists formed in the years immediately after the end of the Second World War. It was formed in 1947, and was re-founded in 1961 as the group Continuità.
