= Achille Perilli =

Italian painter and sculptor (1927–2021)

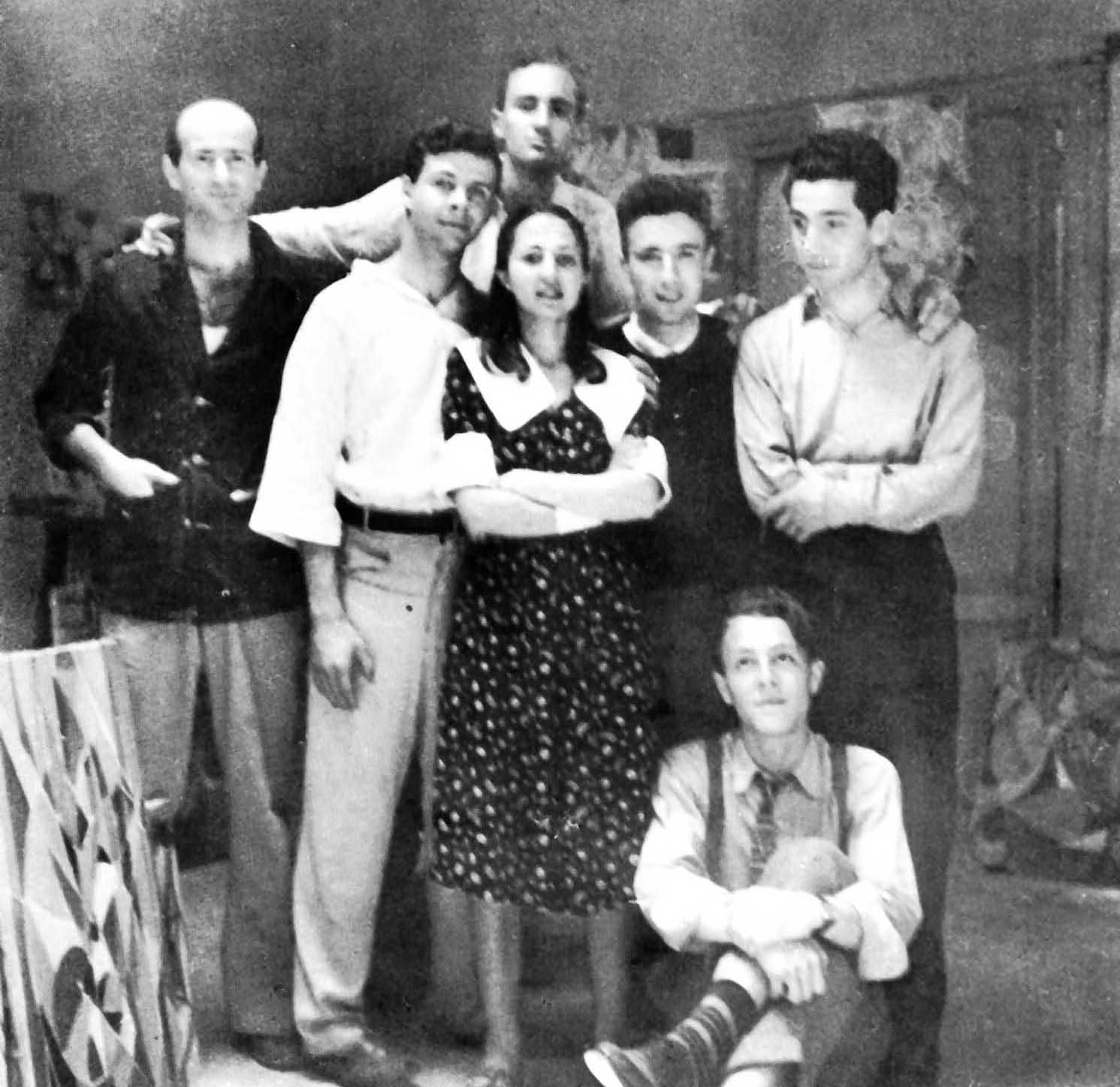
- "Gruppo Forma 1": Pietro Consagra, Mino Guerrini, Ugo Attardi, Carla Accardi, Achille Perilli, Antonio Sanfilippo and Piero Dorazio (Rome, 1947)
- Born: 28 January 1927; Rome, Kingdom of Italy
- Died: 16 October 2021 (aged 94); Orvieto, Italy
- Occupations: Painter; Sculptor

Achille Perilli (28 January 1927 – 16 October 2021) was an Italian painter and sculptor.

== Biography ==
Born in Rome on 28 January 1927, Achille Perilli attended classical secondary school and earned a degree in literature with a thesis on Giorgio de Chirico. After World War II, he founded the group Forma 1 alongside Carla Accardi, Ugo Attardi, Pietro Consagra, Antonio Sanfilippo, and Giulio Turcato. He was a master in abstractionism, as seen in his exhibitions at the Venice Biennale in 1952, 1958, 1962, and 1968. From 1948 to 1986, he participated in the Rome Quadriennale on five occasions. From 1963 to 1964, he participated in the touring exhibition Peintures italiennes d'aujourd'hui in Beyrouth, Damas, Teheran, Ankara and Tunis. In 1995, he became a member of the Accademia di San Luca and received the award from the President of the Republic of Italy Oscar Luigi Scalfaro in 1997.

Perilli died in Orvieto on 16 October 2021.
