= Elvira Banotti =

Italian journalist and writer (1933–2014)

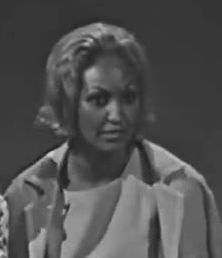
Elvira Banotti 1969

Elvira Banotti (17 July 1933 in Asmara – 2 March 2014 in Lavinio) was an Italian journalist and writer of Italian Eritrean descent, feminist activist and founder of the Rivolta Femminile group in the early 1970s.

== Biography ==
Her grandfather had emigrated to build the railway in the late 1800s, and where he had married an Eritrean woman. Her family, of Italian, Greek and Eritrean origins, moved to Rome between 1962 and 1963. Elvira began working at the age of 14 and was hired at the Italian consulate in Asmara in 1953. She obtained a scientific diploma and enrolled in law in 1961 at the Nigrizia Comboniana University of Asmara. In 1960 she was transferred to the consulate in Addis Ababa where she clashed with the directives of the Italian consul and ambassador. In the meantime, she also devoted herself to fashion, designing models and setting up fashion shows at the Italian club "Juventus" in Addis Ababa. She then returned to Rome at the Ministry of Foreign Affairs, where she took care of the daily press review for the minister.

In Rome she founded the collective "Città sessuale".

In 1969 she participated as a young woman in Gianni Bisiach's program "The hour of truth", in which Indro Montanelli was interviewed, mentioning how he had bought, in 1935, a 12-year-old Abyssinian girl. Banotti intervened, embarrassing him as a colonialist and a rapist, until the transmission was interrupted.

In July 1970 she took part with Carla Lonzi and Carla Accardi in drafting the Manifesto di Rivolta femminile, highlighting the topics that Italian feminism would later make their own: the pride of difference against the claim of equality, the refusal of women's complementarity in any area of life, the criticism of the institution of marriage, the recognition of women's work as productive work, and not least the centrality of the body and the claim of a sexual subjectivity, free from male requests.

In 1971 she published the book La sfida femminile (tr. "The women's challenge"), a text that collected a large number of women's testimonies on abortion and which was slammed as "delusional" by the press, and especially by the Communist Party. For the first time, a book, starting from the historical condition of marginalization of women, conducted a deep study on demography and longevity.

Together with other feminists, Banotti established the "Tribunale 8 marzo" to put religion and the Catholic Church on trial. For a banner that said "The Church conceived the theology of rape", she was herself tried in L'Aquila on charges of vilification of religion, but was acquitted; the crime of vilification of religion was abrogated shortly thereafter.

In the early 70s Banotti went to a small village in the Sicilian hinterland, where a poor girl had been raped by a group of young people, and after visiting the girl's family she crossed the main street of the town at rush hour and entered the barber's shop, where she had her hair redone while lecturing the dumbfounded village men about the relational impotence of males, whom she deemed as congenital rapists.

In controversy with Marxism and communism, she occupied the headquarter of the il manifesto newspaper, addressing its journalists as follows: "You have never made us speak, nor have you ever published the writings that we have sent you; but we will speak the same. You failed comrades and you rambling Marxist women, you have for about a century prevented us women from speaking by appealing to superior reasons; in fact you fed the tradition of rape as a dishonest mediation with and among men, which is the raison d'etre of the false left. today, barring the way for any clarification brought by feminists, you represent in fact the last lie in the history of slavery".

She was also a regular guest at the Maurizio Costanzo Show, in Giuliano Ferrara's L'istruttoria and in other TV programs, in which she attacked male sexuality, which she deemed predatory and without grace. Banotti used to claim that women were not at all interested in the penetrative sexual act itself.

In the 90s and 2000s she wrote for Il Foglio by Giuliano Ferrara, whom she did not spare in her criticisms nonetheless.

In 1995 she attended the Beijing Festival and collected several interviews, making a video, "Parole di Sharazade", on her return. Over the next twenty years she engaged in a legal battle against the pornography broadcast by private televisions, denouncing (among others) Rete Mia, Rete A and Retecapri to the Public Prosecutor's Office, the Guarantor of Publishing and the Minister of Equal Opportunities. In an interview with Corriere della Sera she said: "pornographic advertisement instigate violence against women, presenting rape as an erotic game pleasing to the female".

She also fought against prostitution, which she defined as "the organization of social rape ... perpetrated by a state that punishes collateral crimes, but tolerates violence always suffered by women", and opposed the reopening of legal brothels, including once by knocking a basket of acorns over the head of Tinto Brass.

In 2001 she left her Trastevere apartment to move to Lavinio, where she died on March 2, 2014.

In 2009 she joined the Eudonna movement. In June 2013 she harshly attacked prosecutor Ilda Boccassini from Il Foglio for her "inquisitorial obsessions" towards Berlusconi and the "gay totalitarianism", in particular of Nichi Vendola. A controversy ensued with Giuliano Ferrara and Pietrangelo Buttafuoco.

In 2013, again on Il Foglio, Banotti criticised Minister Kyenge's plans to propose a ius soli reform of citizenship laws, which Banotti described as "a persecution for foreign babies".

She has been called "a very tough separatist feminist, hated by most women who call themselves feminists", "a true progressive", "lonely, paradoxical, bold, controversial, prophetic, Elvira did not seek approval. Her triumphant vitality more often scares women instead of reassuring them".

"I don't care about anything men do or say anymore. Not out of a matter of principle or out of resentment, no ... but I don't draw any stimulus, no indication. They can't stop me anymore. I read their texts and find nothing that can stimulate me. I realize that I have acquired - it is the great female conquest of the last few years - a certainty, a tranquility, a knowledge of myself that allows me to no longer suffer the stimuli that come from outside, the ideological models in force, since in fact I am elsewhere." (interview with "Effe" in 1976 to explain why she refused to vote)

== Works ==
- La sfida femminile. Maternità e aborto, Bari, De Donato, 1971, ASIN B00AG13T74.
- Autobiography Una ragazza speciale, L’Ortica, 2011. ISBN 9788897011200

== Bibliography ==
- "Chi era Elvira Banotti?", Dol's Magazine, archived from the original on 2016-10-28

== See also ==
- Italian Eritreans
- Consciousness raising
- Feminism in Italy
- Second-wave feminism
- Feminist separatism
- History of feminism
