= Banotti =

Banotti is an Italian surname. Notable people with the surname include:

- Elvira Banotti (1933–2014), Italian journalist, writer and feminist activist
- Mary Banotti (1939–2024), Irish politician
