= Lonzi =

Lonzi (Italian pronunciation: [ˈlontsi]) is an Italian surname. Notable people with this surname include:

- Antonella Ragno-Lonzi (born 1940), Italian fencer
- Carla Lonzi (1931–1982), Italian art critic and feminist activist
- Gianni Lonzi (born 1938), Italian water polo player
