= Feminism in Italy =

Feminism in Italy originated during the Italian Renaissance period, beginning in the late 13th century. Italian writers such as Moderata Fonte, Lucrezia Marinella, and others developed the theoretical ideas behind gender equality. In contrast to feminist movements in France and United Kingdom, early women's rights advocates in Italy emphasized women's education and improvement in social conditions.

Italian feminism suffered a setback under the fascist government of Benito Mussolini in the first half of the twentieth century, with fascist ideology dictating procreation as a woman's duty. In the post-war period, feminist movements surged, with public activism over issues such as divorce and abortion during the 1970s. Italian feminism has become more prominent recently, particularly during the administration of former Prime Minister Silvio Berlusconi, with a focus on opposing objectification of women in national television shows and politics.

== History ==
=== Renaissance and early modern feminists ===
Renaissance thinkers regularly challenged conventional thought from the Medieval period and earlier. Humanism became the new way of looking at politics, science, the arts, education, and other fields. Humanism pushed aside the Medieval Christian concept of a hierarchical social order that placed regular citizens in a subservient position relative to members of the clergy. The Renaissance man was the ideal to emulate.

While the Renaissance humanists were for the most part "antifeminist", there were a small number of educated women who had the motivation to challenge assumptions that women should remain submissive to men. Christine de Pizan wrote The City of Ladies in 1404, and in it she describes women's gender as having no innate inferiority to men's: "[N]either the loftiness nor the lowliness of a person lies in the body according to sex, but in the perfection of conduct and virtues". However, she tempered her assertions by writing that men were created to rule, and women to follow.

Renaissance Italy saw the development of higher education, including the establishment of several universities, to which women were not admitted. Some fortunate women who could afford it were able to gain an education on their own, or had a father who allowed them to have some education through tutoring. The rare Renaissance man who supported education for women saw it as a way of improving her virtue, and to make her more obedient to her husband. Education intended to create leaders was seen as wasted on women.

Although some women made a mark during the Renaissance as remarkable individuals within their local sphere, when taken collectively, the "rise of the educated woman during the Renaissance" can be traced. Outside of a convent setting, where they had been confined during the Middle Ages, educated women were stepping out into the secular intellectual arena. From the Renaissance and continuing into the early modern era, they hosted salons, where men and women of intellect mingled and discussed literature, politics, and other influential topics. By the late 16th and early 17th century, women writers "presented themselves and were embraced by contemporary culture as learned wives, mothers, and equal partners in their household salons". By the late Renaissance, educated Italian women were writing "in every conceivable genre, from domestic correspondence to poetry, dialogues and even theology".

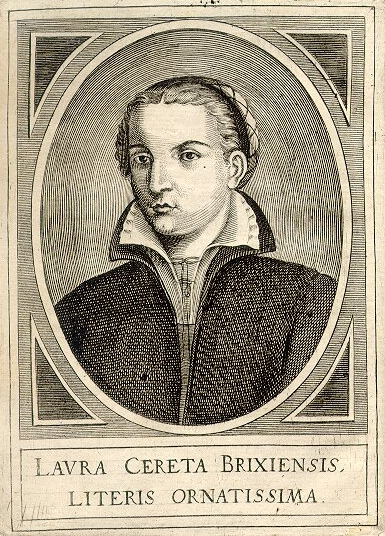
Laura Cereta

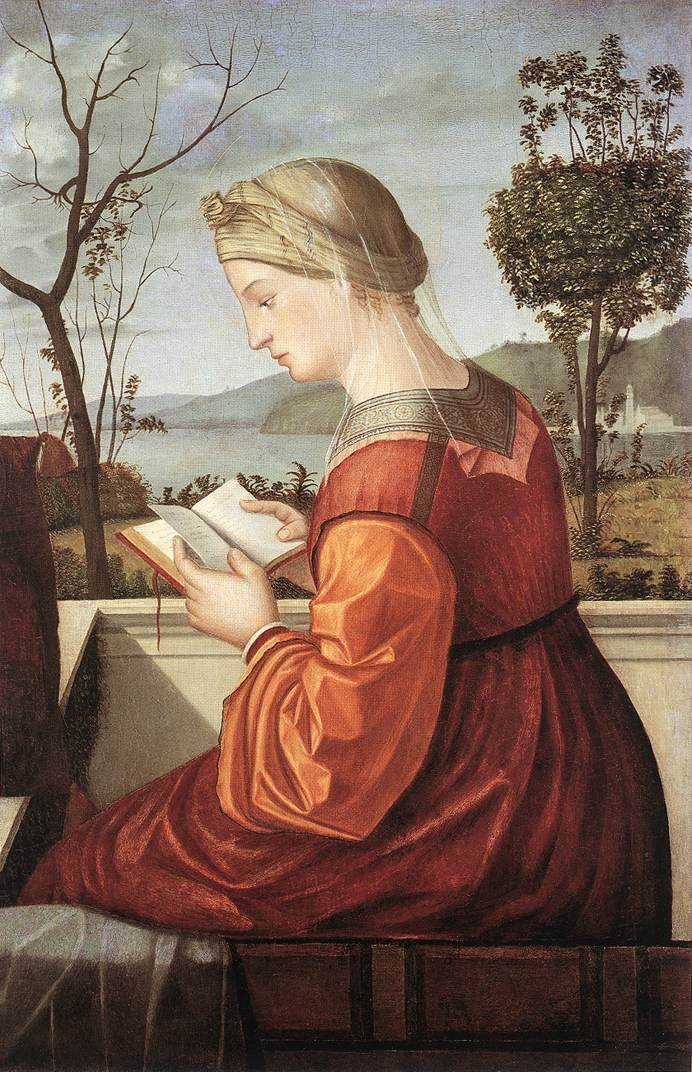
The Virgin Reading (1505–10), by Vittore Carpaccio. Literacy spread among upper-class women in Italy during the Renaissance.

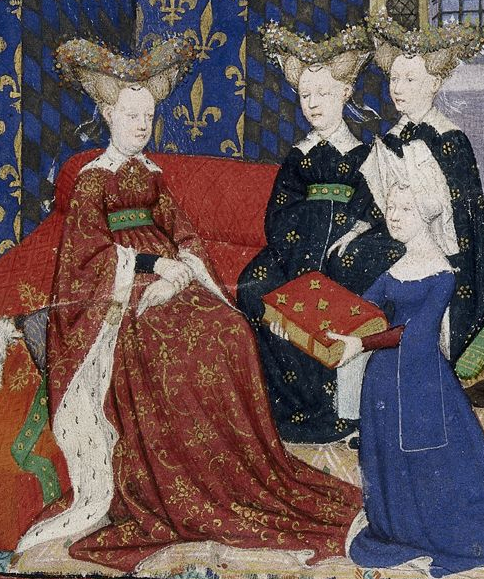
Christine de Pizan and Isabeau of Bavaria, Queen of France.

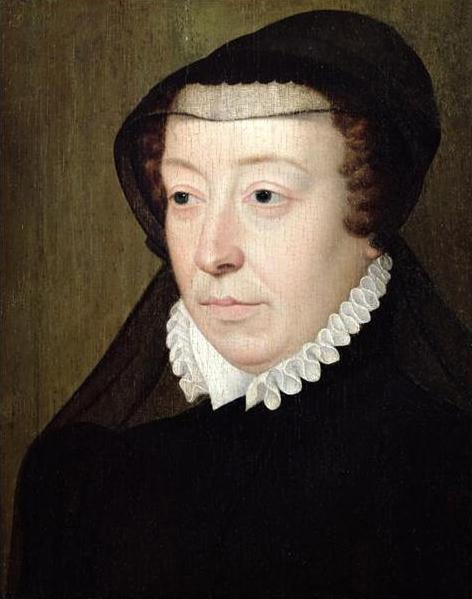
Catherine de' Medici, Italian-born 16th century Queen consort of France, mother of kings, and a major figure in European politics.

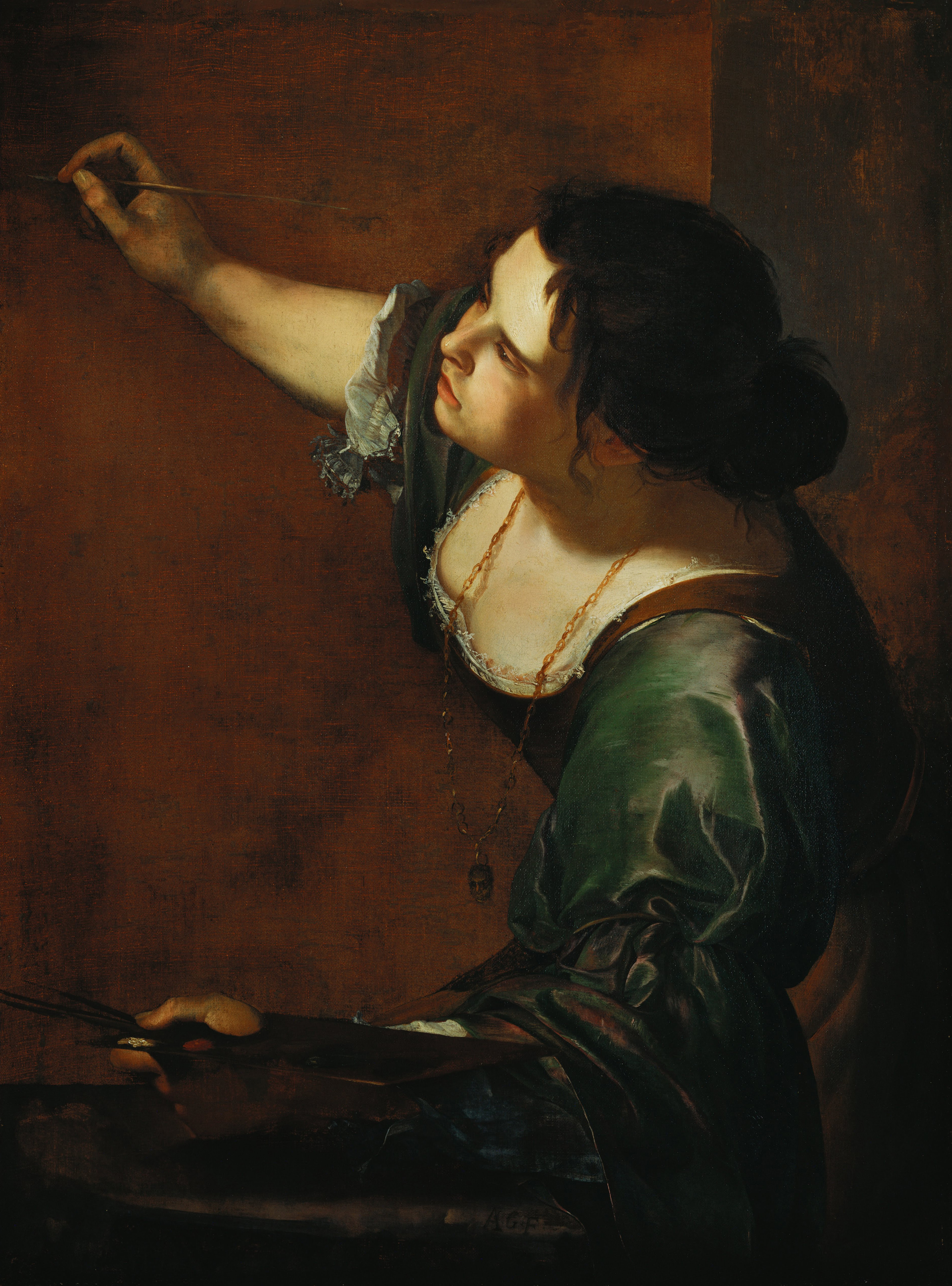
Self-portrait as the Allegory of Painting (1638–9) by Artemisia Gentileschi.

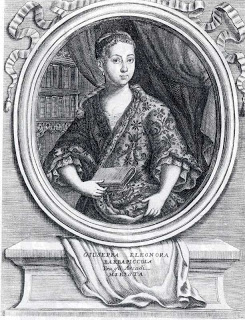
Giuseppa Barbapiccola

=== 19th century ===
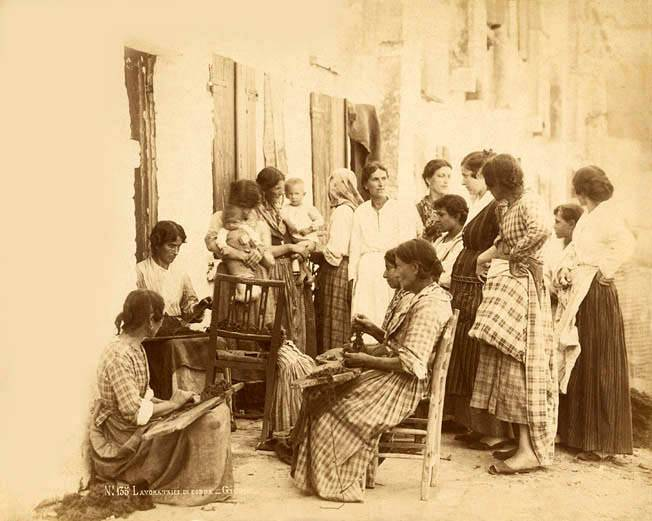
Working Italian women, c. 1900.

At a time when most women belonged to the peasant class, most were illiterate. Educated women who could read and write about feminism's various aspects were in an isolated position. In order to gain supporters for feminist causes, an appeal to women at all levels of society was needed. Beginning in the mid-19th century, enterprising women began to reach out to middle-class women through new print media: mass-market books and periodicals.

Italy's Casati Law of 1859 set the groundwork for a system to train young women as teachers in public schools. Women were to become the backbone of Italy's education system, and they belonged to teachers' associations, giving them experience in organizing to protect their interests, such as wages and working conditions.

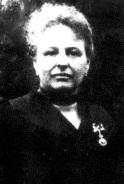
Anna Maria Mozzoni

Anna Maria Mozzoni triggered a widespread women's movement in Italy through the publication of Woman and her social relationships on the occasion of the revision of the Italian Civil Code (La donna e i suoi rapporti sociali in occasione della revisione del codice italiano) in 1864. Women who had participated in the unification struggles were dissatisfied with the inequalities contained in the Kingdom of Italy's new Civil Code. Mozzoni's book raised awareness of injustices in Italy's family law that discriminated against women. Mozzoni campaigned against state regulation of prostitution. She also translated On the Subjugation of Women by John Stuart Mill into Italian. In 1881, to promote women's suffrage, she founded the League for the Promotion of the Interests of Women (Lega promotrice degli interessi femminili) in Milan.

1865 saw legal majority for unmarried women in Italy, as well as equal inheritance for women, and married women being allowed to become the legal guardian of their children and their property if abandoned by their husbands.

Alaide Gualberta Beccari, beginning in 1868 at the age of 26, began publishing the journal Women in Venice. Beccari spent much of the 1870s and 1880s immersed in spreading information about feminism. The journal covered international feminist news, such as the political and social gains being made by women in France, the United States, and Great Britain. Male legislators and teachers were among her growing readership, and in 1877, a series of articles on pro-reform topics inspired 3000 women to sign a petition for women's suffrage.

Women were admitted to Italian universities in 1876.

In 1877 women in Italy became able to serve as witnesses to legal acts.

Italy's first national Feminist Congress was organized by Per la Donna in 1911; in it speakers called for divorce rights for women, and more non-religious schools.

In 1919 married women in Italy were granted separate economy, and public offices on lower levels were opened to women.

=== Women in Fascist Italy (1922-1945) ===
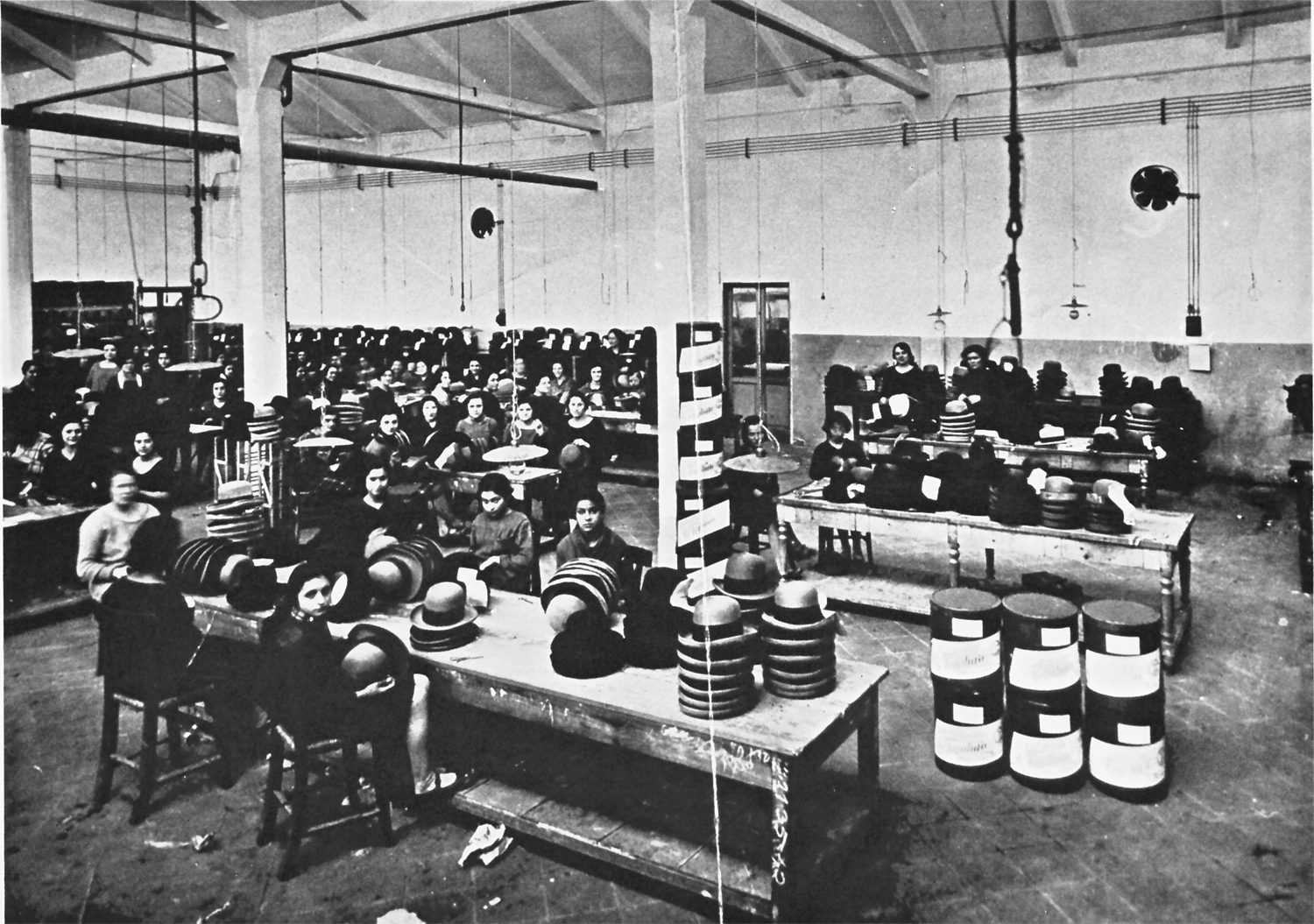
Women working in a hat factory, c. 1920.

The feminist movement was dealt a huge blow in 1922 when Benito Mussolini came to power, and the country's fascist era was underway. This period was generally anti-feminist. For example, fascist ideology dictated procreation as a woman's duty.

However, in 1925 women in Italy gained the right to vote, though it was limited to local elections. Initially, Fascism had an ambivalent view on women's position, and Mussolini promised the leader of the Fasci Femminili, Elisa Majer Rizzioli, to introduce women's suffrage. However, he only introduced municipal suffrage in 1925 and then abolished free elections altogether, making also the municipal suffrage meaningless. After an unsuccessful attempt of the Fascist women to become autonomous in 1924, they were efficiently deprived of all real political influence within the party: after 1930, the Fascist women organizations did not even have a leader, the leadership post of the Fasci Femminili being first left vacant, and from 1937 divided between several people.

The role of women in Fascist ideology was foremost to demonstrate her patriotism and supporting her country by giving birth to children which she would raise to become soldiers or mothers who in turn would support expansionism. While girls were not banned from studying, the cost for women students were raised to discourage it; and while women were not banned from working, certain restrictions were introduced to prevent women from being placed in authority over men in the professional life, such as banning women from certain leadership positions in the educational system which could have given them authority over male colleagues.

In 1945 women in Italy gained full suffrage.

=== Post-war Italian feminism ===
Franca Viola is considered one of the first Italian rape victims to publicly refuse to marry her rapist, as she and her family had instead pursued his prosecution. The 1966 trial had wide resonance in Italy, as Viola's behavior clashed with traditional social conventions in Sicily, whereby a woman would lose her honour if she did not marry the man to whom she had lost her virginity. Franca Viola became a symbol of the cultural progress and emancipation of women in post-war Italy. (See below events in 1981.)

As in other countries, feminist groups started in Italy in the 1970s as part of the second wave. In 1970, Rivolta Femminile ("Women's Revolt") was formed in Rome and Milan by Carla Lonzi, Carla Accardi, and Elvira Banotti; the collective published a manifesto.

In 1974, the Wages for Housework Campaign began in Italy. A number of groups calling themselves Salario al Lavoro Domestico (Wages for Housework) formed in various Italian cities. To celebrate, one of the founding members, Mariarosa Dalla Costa, gave a speech entitled "A General Strike" in Mestre, Italy. In this speech she talks about how no strike before has ever been a general strike before, but instead, only a strike for male workers. In Padua, Italy, a group called Lotta Feminista, formed by Mariarosa Dalla Costa and Silvia Federici, adopted Wages for Housework as their organizing strategy. The Campaign was formed to raise awareness of how housework and childcare are the base of all industrial work and to stake the claim that these unavoidable tasks should be compensated as paid wage labor. The Wages for Housework Campaign called for economic compensation for domestic work but also used this demand to call attention to the labors of women, the reliance of capitalist economies on exploitative labor practices against women, and leisure inequality.

In 1975, the family law in Italy was reformed to remove adultery as a crime, as well as making it so that male and female partners in a marriage are considered equal by the law. Specifically, Law no 151/1975 provides for gender equality within marriage, abolishing the legal dominance of the husband. 1975 Italian legal reforms also removed discrimination against children who were not born in wedlock.

In 1976 in Sentenza n. 12857 del 1976, the Supreme Court of Italy ruled that "the spouse who compels the other spouse to carnal knowledge by violence or threats commits the crime of carnal violence" [meaning rape] ("commette il delitto di violenza carnale il coniuge che costringa con violenza o minaccia l'altro coniuge a congiunzione carnale").

Among the other major achievements of feminism in Italy in this decade were the introduction of a law for divorce (1970) and of a law regulating abortion (1978).

Italy signed the Convention on the Elimination of All Forms of Discrimination against Women in 1980, and ratified it in 1985.

1981 saw repeal of the Italian law which provided for mitigated punishment in case of honor killings; prior to 1981, the law read: Art. 587: He who causes the death of a spouse, daughter, or sister upon discovering her in illegitimate carnal relations and in the heat of passion caused by the offence to his honour or that of his family will be sentenced to three to seven years. The same sentence shall apply to whom, in the above circumstances, causes the death of the person involved in illegitimate carnal relations with his spouse, daughter, or sister.

Also in 1981, Italy repealed Article 544. This article stated that if a man who raped a woman married his victim, even if she was a minor, any sexual offence would lapse. Neither the law nor society made a distinction between such premarital rape on the one hand, and consensual elopement (in Sicily commonly called fuitina) on the other. Socially, a woman raped by a man was put under heavy pressure to agree to marrying her rapist; the alternative was being shunned for the rest of her life as una donna svergognata: a "woman without honor" (literally: a shameless woman). She was held responsible for the humiliation of losing her virginity out of wedlock, bringing shame upon herself and her family. If she agreed to marry her attacker, it was considered a "reparational marriage" (matrimonio riparatore), that restored her family's honor.

In Rome in 1992, a 45-year-old driving instructor was accused of rape. When he picked up an 18-year-old girl for her first driving lesson, he allegedly raped her for an hour, then told her that if she was to tell anyone he would kill her. Later that night she told her parents and her parents agreed to help her press charges. While the alleged rapist was convicted and sentenced, the Supreme Court of Cassation overturned the conviction in 1998 because the victim wore tight jeans. It was argued that she must have necessarily have had to help her attacker remove her jeans, thus making the act consensual ("because the victim wore very, very tight jeans, she had to help him remove them...and by removing the jeans...it was no longer rape but consensual sex"). The court stated in its decision "it is a fact of common experience that it is nearly impossible to slip off tight jeans even partly without the active collaboration of the person who is wearing them." This ruling sparked widespread feminist protest. The day after the decision, women in the Italian Parliament protested by wearing jeans and holding placards that read "Jeans: An Alibi for Rape." As a sign of support, the California Senate and Assembly followed suit. Soon Patricia Giggans, executive director of the Los Angeles Commission on Assaults Against Women, (now Peace Over Violence) made Denim Day an annual event. As of 2011 at least 20 U.S. states officially recognize Denim Day in April. Wearing jeans on this day has become an international symbol of protest against erroneous and destructive attitudes about sexual assault. In 2008 the Supreme Court of Cassation overturned the ruling, so there is no longer a "denim" defense to the charge of rape.

In 1996, Italy amended its rape laws, toughening the punishment for sexual assault and reclassifying it from a moral offense to a criminal felony.

After a few cases of infibulation practiced by complaisant medical practitioners within the African immigrant community came to public knowledge through media coverage, the Law n°7/2006 was passed in Italy on 1/9/2006, becoming effective on 1/28/2006, concerning "Measures of prevention and prohibition of any female genital mutilation practice"; the Act is also known as the Legge Consolo ("Consolo Act") named after its primary promoter, Senator Giuseppe Consolo. Article 6 of the law integrates the Italian Penal Code with Articles 583-Bis and 583-Ter, punishing any practice of female genital mutilation "not justifiable under therapeutical or medical needs" with imprisonment ranging from 4 to 12 years (3 to 7 years for any mutilation other than, or less severe than, clitoridectomy, excision or infibulation). Penalty can be reduced up to 2/3 if the harm caused is of modest entity (i.e. if partially or completely unsuccessful), but may also be elevated up to 1/3 if the victim is a minor or if the offense has been committed for profit. An Italian citizen or a foreign citizen legally resident in Italy can be punished under this law even if the offense is committed abroad; the law will as well afflict any individual of any citizenship in Italy, even illegally or provisionally. The law also mandates any medical practitioner found guilty under those provisions to have his/her medical license revoked for a minimum of six up to a maximum of ten years.

In 2022 the Constitutional Court of Italy ruled against automatically giving Italian children only their father's last name. The court stated that unless the parents agree the child should have one of their surnames, the child should have both, in the order the parents agree on.

In 2025, a law was enacted adding femicide to the criminal code of Italy, and making it punishable by life in prison. Femicide under this law applies to women being killed as an “act of hatred or discrimination,” or “an act of control or possession or domination”, as well as women being killed because they wish to leave a relationship, and women being killed when there is an effort to restrict their “individual freedoms”.
