= Piero Dorazio =

Italian painter (1927–2005)

Piero Dorazio (Rome, June 29, 1927 — Perugia, May 17, 2005) was an Italian painter. His work was related to color field painting, lyrical abstraction and other forms of abstract art.

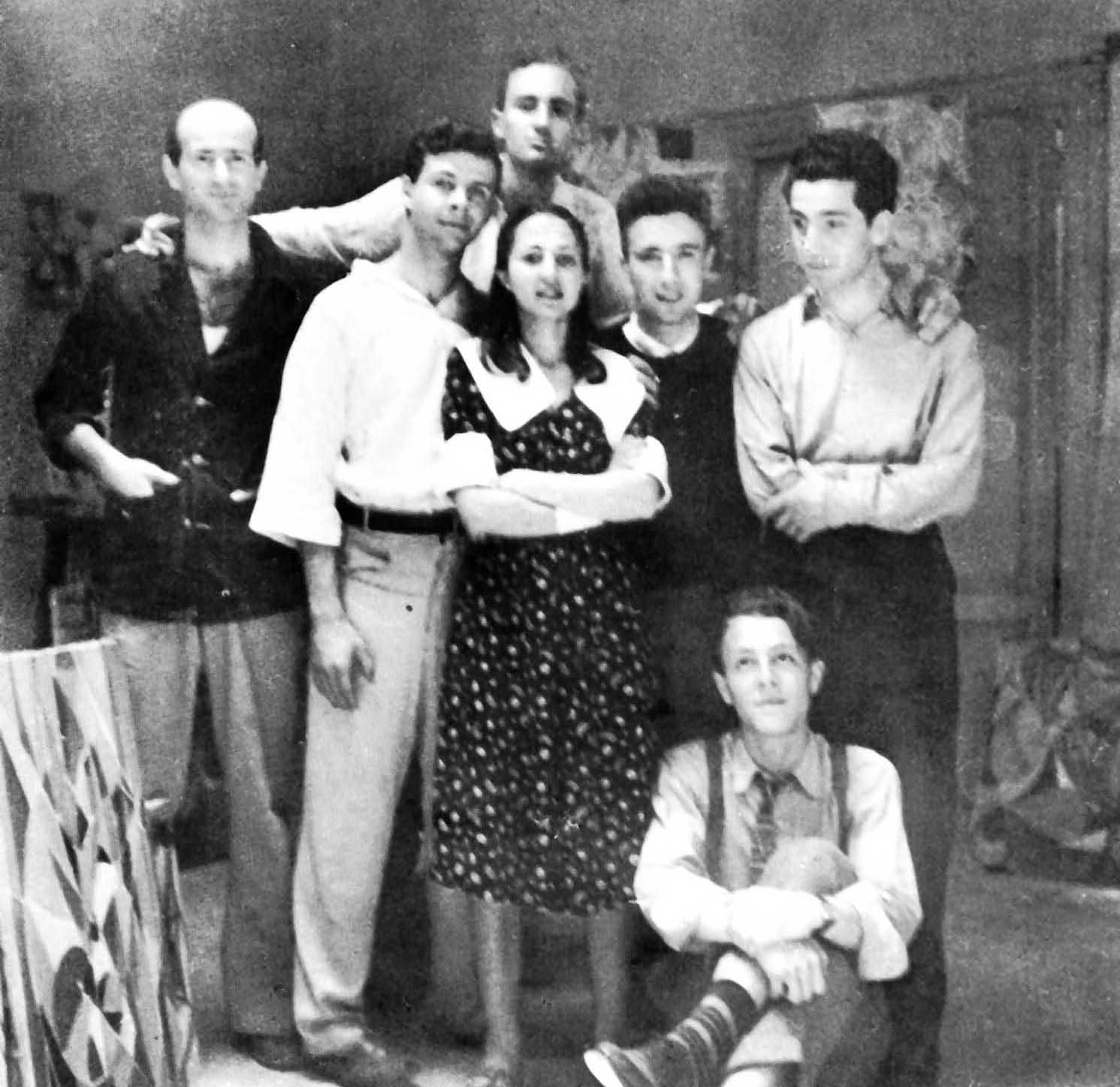
Forma 1 artists: Pietro Consagra, Mino Guerrini, Ugo Attardi, Carla Accardi, Achille Perilli, Antonio Sanfilippo, Giulio Turcato, and Piero Dorazio (sitting below).

== Early life ==
Dorazio was born in Rome. His father was a civil servant, while his mother was interested in history and art. Dorazio attended Julius Caesar Lyceum (high school) in Rome. The family fled to their homeland province of Abruzzo in 1943. After the war, Dorazio worked briefly as a translator for the British Army and then studied architecture at the University of Rome.

He was influenced by futurists such as Gino Severini, Antonio Corpora, Enrico Prampolini, and Giacomo Balla, attracting him to painting. An aversion to their right-wing views pushed him to align instead with left-leaning artists like Renato Guttuso. Along with Pietro Consagra, Achille Perilli, and Giulio Turcato, he helped formulate a manifesto and establish a group of abstract artists in 1947 called Forma I. Although imbued with socialist leanings, the group did not follow the realist social commentary furthered by Guttuso but proposed to reclaim abstraction from Futurism. In 1947 Dorazio won a prize and a stipend from the French government to study at the École des Beaux-Arts of Paris.

Dorazio, along with artists Mino Perilli and Guerrini, helped found L'Age d'Or in 1950. It was a bookstore/gallery space dedicated to abstract art. In 1952, he promoted the foundation Origin with Alberto Burri, Ettore Colla and others, and edited the magazine Arti Visive. As a representative of Italy, in 1953 he travelled for the first time to the United States to participate in the International Summer Seminar at Harvard University. That fall, he moved to New York City and stayed through 1954. In October 1953, Dorazio had his first solo exhibition at George Wittenborn's One-Wall Gallery.

He published La Fantasia Dell-Arte Nella Vita Moderna" in 1955, a review of modern art in Italy. Regarding this book, reviewer Christopher Masters states that Dorazio advanced his belief, perhaps with a surfeit of optimism, that "abstract art could change the world... That just as science and technology were destroying the barriers between different cultures, so the new 'universal style' would lead to a 'universal civilisation'."

He was invited to teach at the Graduate School of Fine Arts program at the University of Pennsylvania School of Design in 1959. There he worked with Hitoshi Nakazato, a Japanese painter and printmaker, and Otto Piene, a member of the group ZERO. Dorazio taught painting there for one semester each year from 1960 to 1969, splitting his time between the United States and Italy. In 1970 he returned to live and work full-time in Rome. In 1974 he moved his studio from Rome to Umbria, near Todi. Peter Iden, founding director of the Museum für Moderne Kunst Frankfurt from 1978-1987, acquired three works by Dorazio from 1981 to 1983 (Oracolo, 1959; Blue Hearttrap, 1961; Stridente, 1982–83) for the museum collection. These were part of the museum exhibitions in Frankfurt in 1985 and Milan in 1987. In the 1990s, the works were temporarily loaned to the European Central Bank. Dorazio continued to work and exhibit until 2004.

Described as an "outspoken, independent character" who was the "opposite of politically correct", Dorazio's use of materials and colours stayed constant over time. He is mostly known for paintings with thick bands of bright colour and crosshatched grids. While abstract, his paintings do not neglect detail or complexity. His style is in line with what Clement Greenberg later described as "Post-painterly abstraction".

== Exhibitions including his work ==
Among the exhibitions that have included or featured Dorazio's work are:

- 1952 Venice Biennale
- 1953 Wittenborn One-Wall Gallery, New York
- 1960 Venice Biennale
- 1965 "The Responsive Eye", Museum of Modern Art, New York
- 1970 André Emmerich Gallery, New York
- 1979 Retrospective, Musée d'Art Moderne de la Ville, Paris
- 1980 Albright-Knox Art Gallery, Buffalo
- 1985 "Bilder für Frankfurt", Museum für Moderne Kunst Frankfurt
- 1987 "Dalla Pop Art alla nuova figurazione", Collezione del Museum für Moderne Kunst al Padiglione d‘arte contemporanea Milano
- 1990 Le Magasin, Grenoble
- 1991 Galleria d'Arte Moderna, Bologna

== Recognition ==
- Prix Kandinsky (1961)
- The highest recorded auction price for a work by Dorazio is about €2.6 million for Tic Tac Rosso, sold at Ketterer Kunst in 2026.
