= James Johnson Sweeney =

American curator (1900–1986)

James Johnson Sweeney (May 30, 1900 – April 14, 1986) was an American museum curator and writer about modern art. While working for his family's importing business, Sweeney began to work as an editor, curator, art historian and critic. He was a curator for the Museum of Modern Art in New York from 1935 to 1946, Director of the Solomon R. Guggenheim Museum, from 1952 to 1960 and Director of the Museum of Fine Arts, Houston, from 1961 to 1967. Trevor Stark, writing for the Metropolitan Museum of Art, called Sweeney "a tireless advocate for the most adventurous strains of modern art".

== Early life and education ==
Sweeney was born in Brooklyn, New York, to Irish immigrants who ran a textile importing business, and grew up in Cincinnati and Chicago. He graduated with an A.B. degree from Georgetown University in 1922 and then studied art and literature Jesus College at Cambridge University in England until 1924, at the Sorbonne in Paris in 1925, and at the University of Siena in Italy in 1926. He married Laura Harden in 1927, and the couple had five children. While working for his family's importing business, Sweeney began work as an editor, curator, art historian and critic.

== MoMA and Guggenheim ==
He was appointed to the Executive Committee of Museum of Modern Art (MoMA) in New York in 1931, and from 1935 to 1946, he was a curator for the MoMA. He also was an editor for the journal Transition from 1936 to 1938. He served on the Board of the International Association of Art Critics from 1948 to 1963, including as its president from 1957 to 1963.

He was the second director of the Solomon R. Guggenheim Museum, from 1952 to 1960. During his tenure, he expanded the scope of the collection to include abstract expressionist painting as well as sculpture, established the long-term loans program in 1953 and the Guggenheim International Award in 1956. He oversaw the museum during the final years of the design and during the construction of the Frank Lloyd Wright-designed museum building, opened in 1959, during which time he and the architect had a contentious relationship, frequently disagreeing over the design of the museum.

Sweeney collected works by: Alexander Archipenko, Constantin Brâncuși, Alberto Burri, Alexander Calder, César, Alberto Giacometti, Lucio Fontana, David Hayes, Willem de Kooning, Fernand Léger, Joan Miró, Piet Mondrian, Pablo Picasso, Jackson Pollock and Pierre Soulages.

== Later years ==
He was Director of the Museum of Fine Arts, Houston, from 1961 to 1967 and was later a consultant there. In the late 1960s, Sweeney was a consultant to the National Gallery of Australia during its establishment, advising on issues concerning the display and storage of art, influencing its collection and brutalist design. According to the Gallery's first director, James Mollison, "the size and form of the building had been determined between Colin Madigan and J.J. Sweeney, and the National Capital Development Commission. I was not able to alter the appearance of the interior or exterior in any way. ... It's a very difficult building in which to make art look more important than the space in which you put the art". In the 1970s, Sweeney was Art Adviser and Chairman of the Executive Committee at the Israel Museum, Jerusalem, and he continued to write articles and contribute to catalogues for exhibitions.

Sweeney died on April 14, 1986, in Manhattan.
