= Cretto di Burri =

Landscape artwork by Alberto Burri

Coordinates: 37°47′17″N 12°58′17″E

Il Grande Cretto
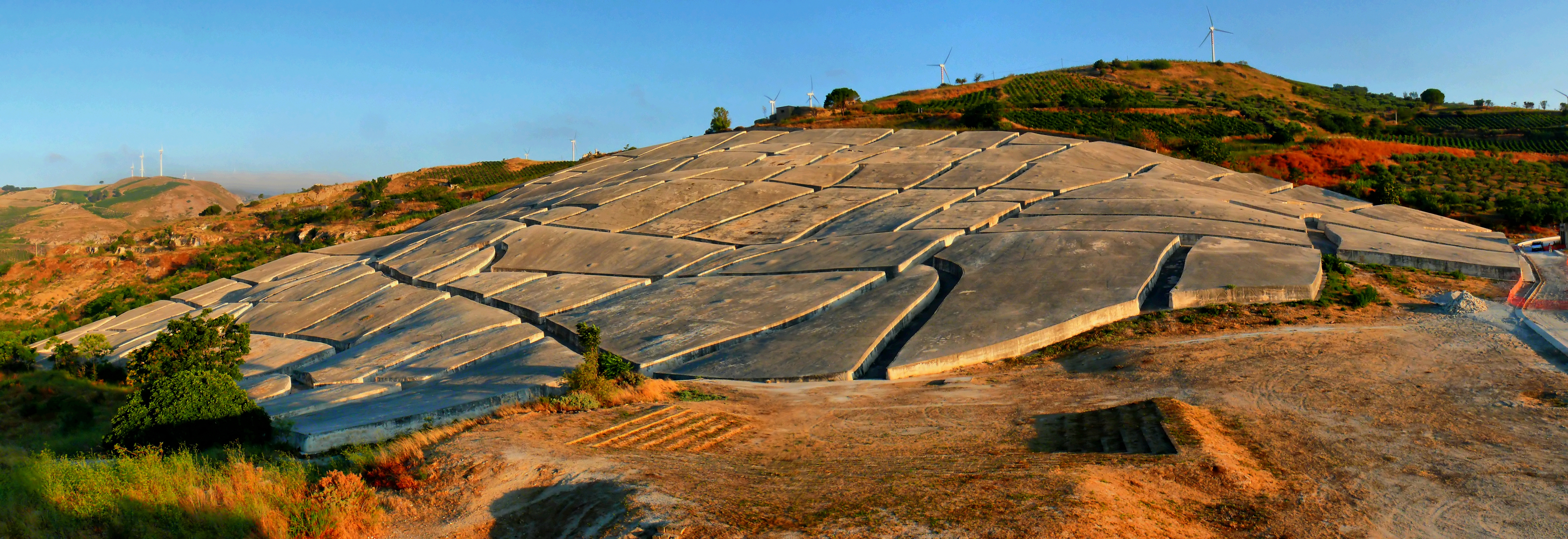
- Artist: Alberto Burri
- Year: 1984–2015
- Type: Concrete sculpture
- Dimensions: 1.50 m × 350 m × 280 m (4.9 ft × 1,150 ft × 920 ft)
- Location: Gibellina, Sicily

The Cretto di Burri (crack of Burri) or Cretto di Gibellina (crack of Gibellina), also known as "Il Grande Cretto (The Great Crack)", is a landscape artwork undertaken by Alberto Burri in 1984, built on the ruins of the town of Gibellina. Due to lack of funds, the work was left unfinished from 1989 to 2015, when it was completed.

The layout of the artwork is based on the layout of the old city of Gibellina in north-west Sicily. The original city of Gibellina was completely destroyed in the 1968 Belice earthquake. Due to the seismic instability of the original town site, Gibellina was not rebuilt in place; rather, a new town, Nuova Gibellina, was built nearby. This new town was designed by prominent Italian artists and architects.

The ruins of the old town were left to decay until work began on the Cretto in 1984. Alberto Burri proposed an artwork for the old town that would keep the original streetscape as a memorial. He began pouring white cement over the rubble of the old town, but the project was unable to get much funding, and in 1989, work paused with the project only one-third completed. Burri died in 1995, with the project still incomplete. The work was finally completed in 2015, to mark what would have been Burri's one hundredth birthday. The finished work spans an area of approximately 85,000 square metres (21 acres).

In the same year Dutch artist Petra Noordkamp made a film about 'Il Grande Cretto di Gibellina' for the retrospective of Alberto Burri (from October 2015 - January 2016) at the Guggenheim Museum in New York commissioned by the Solomon R. Guggenheim Foundation.

In 2023 the Cretto hosted the closure of the 42nd edition of the "Orestiadi" festival, with the music of Italian songwriter Mario Venuti. The Orestiadi of 2023 saw a record in spectators.

The Cretto is also the subject of the theatrical show "I-TIGI a Gibellina" and its video transposition "I-TIGI Canto per Ustica" by the Italian stage actor, theater director, dramaturge and author Marco Paolini. Shot entirely within the Cretto di Burri in the year 2000, it's the story of the DC9 ITAVIA, which sank in the waters of Ustica in June 1980, and the reconstruction of the long investigation conducted by the Italian judge Rosario Priore. The author declared that he chose the Cretto because "it is a sort of concrete labyrinth, which, seen from above, is similar to the maze of lies in which the judges had to orient themselves to find the thread of the investigation".

Portions of the music video for the song "Pushing the Tides" by the band Mastodon were filmed at the Cretto.
