= Carla Lonzi =

Italian art critic and feminist (1931–1982)

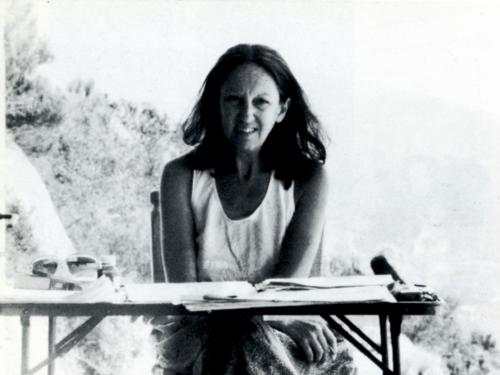
- Carla Lonzi
- Born: Carla Lonzi; 6 March 1931; Florence
- Died: 2 August 1982 (aged 51); Milan
- Education: Humanities, University of Florence
- Occupations: Writer, art critic
- Known for: Feminism

Carla Lonzi (Florence, 6 March 1931 – Milan, 2 August 1982) was an Italian art critic and feminist activist, who is best known as the cofounder of Rivolta Femminile (Feminine Revolt), an Italian feminist collective formed in 1970.

Lonzi's most significant works include Autoritratto ("Self-Portrait", 1969); "Writings on Art" (1970); Manifesto di Rivolta femminile ("Manifesto of the Feminine Revolt", 1970); Sputiamo su Hegel, La donna clitoridea e la donna vaginale e altri scritti ("Let's Spit on Hegel, The Clitoridian Woman and the Vaginal Woman, and Other Writings", 1974); and "Diary of a Feminist" (1977).

== Personal life ==
Carla Lonzi was born in Florence, Italy, on 6 March 1931 to a middle-class family. Her father owned a small industrial company and her mother dedicated her life to the nurture and education of Lonzi and her four siblings. Her sister Marta Lonzi (1938–2008), an architect, was also a feminist activist.

In her early twenties, Lonzi became greatly interested in film and theatre, both as a spectator and creator. This lead her to performance art, a practice she liked for its ability to stage real life experiences and revealing truths. Lonzi did her final dissertation on theatre and graduated from the University of Florence. Later in her career, the lessons she learned from film and the theatre continued to influence her work.

In 1955 Lonzi married Mario Lena. In 1960, she gave birth to their son, Battista Lena. Lonzi found married life straining. She and Lena separated in 1963. The following year, in 1964, Lonzi began her relationship with Pietro Consagra, an Italian sculptor. Lonzi and Consagra never married. Their relationship ended in 1969, following the publication of Lonzi's Autorittrato.

== Art criticism ==
Lonzi began her career as an art critic in the late 1950s. In 1966 she authored a monograph on the work of Surrealist painter Henri Rousseau. In 1969 she published Autorittrato, a book collecting a series of tape-recorded conversations between Lonzi and 14 artists between 1965 and 1969. Autorittrato reworked the role and identity of the art critic by deploying a style of writing revolving around subjectivity and discussion. This style is characterized by a natural flow, the signalling of pauses, and a first-person narrative. Further, Lonzi strayed from the most traditional use of photography, using caption-less, black and white, personal photos of the artists instead of images of their work. Most importantly, Autorittrato revealed Lonzi's theory of creative subjectivity, one which aims to deconstruct patriarchal concepts such as individuality. Through her recorded interviews Lonzi was seeking to capture the processes art that she argued was often lost in art's exhibitions.

The artists featured in Autorittrato were: Lucio Fontana, Jannis Kounellis, Luciano Fabro, Pino Pascali, Giulio Paolini, Mimmo Rotella, Carla Accardi (the only female artist), Getulio Alviani, Enrico Castellani, Mario Nigro, Salvatore Scarpitta, Giulio Turcato, Cy Twombly and Pietro Consagra.

Lonzi's art criticism went largely unnoticed and was barely mentioned within academic circles. There are several proposed explanations for this, including that Lonzi's art historical work was widely interpreted as an extension of her work as a feminist activist and that it did not adopt the traditional approach to the promotion of Italian art used in the 1970s and 80s.

Scholars have described Autorittrato as Lonzi's farewell to the art world. Although she viewed art as incompatible with the objectives of radical feminism, she continued writing about art or "creativity as a mode of self-emancipation." Lonzi's following book, Writings on Art is a diaristic text written between 1955 and 1970. Because it spans over a 15-year period, its ideas are in constant evolution. Most of the ideas expressed in the book are gathered from information collected from periodicals, exhibition catalogues, conference papers, and newspaper essays.

== Feminist activism ==
=== Turn to activism ===
In the early 1970s, Lonzi adopted a feminist stance in relation to art. She had grown to view art as being yet another part of a system of institutions and labour which enable unequal power relations and the overall oppression of women. Lonzi became disillusioned and went as far as dismissing art criticism as a "phoney profession". She subsequently abandoned her career as an art critic and fully embraced the feminist cause.

Despite her eventual negative outlook on the field of art and art criticism, Lonzi has said that the experience and knowledge she gained from her work as art critic informed her feminist activism.

=== Rivolta Femminile ===
In 1970 Lonzi, Carla Accardi, and Elvira Banotti founded Rivolta Femminile, an Italian feminist collective. Their first action, in July 1970, consisted of plastering the walls of Rome with copies of the "Manifesto di Rivolta Femminile". The politics of Rivolta Femminile were largely grounded in "autocoscienza" theory and practices. "Autocoscienza", meaning a heightened sense of self-consciousness or self-awareness, was a collective exercise of feminist "consciousness-raising." Its core belief was that women can better understand themselves through being engaged in an open dialogue with other women.

Rivolta Femminile developed its own publishing house, Scritti di Rivolta Femminile, which allowed the group to print and distribute its own work. This was important to Lonzi who had a particular interest in writing and publishing.

=== Writing ===
Lonzi was the author of some of Italian Feminism's most important documents. Her numerous provocative texts and manifestos pushed the boundaries of the traditional understanding of conversationalism and the manifesto format. This was accomplished through continuous experimentation with writing and knowledge production. Some of Lonzi's most notable works from this period include "The Clitoral and the Vaginal Woman", "Let's spit on Hegel", and "Diary of a Feminist".

Lonzi's Diary of a Feminist is a series of diary entries written between 1972 and 1977. The Diary largely chronicles Lonzi's social experiments with relationships, as well as an exploration of female sexuality and a pursuit of truth. We Are All Clitoridian Women: Notes on Carla Lonzi's Legacy – Journal #47 September 2013 – e-flux It makes reference to many important people in Lonzi's life, although they are referred to using fictitious names. Some of these individuals include Accardi, Consagra, and her sister Marta Lonzi, who was also a member of the Rivolta Femminile. In addition, there exist many contradictions between the early and late years of the diary. For example, in the first sections of the work Lonzi seems to be principally concerned with the collective of women, which corresponds with the concept of "autocoscienza", whereas in the later sections she largely focuses on her relationship with Consagra.

Let's Spit on Hegel (1970) is considered one of the seminal texts of Italian feminism. It questioned women's claim for equality by stressing the patriarchal character of Hegel's dialectic and 'theory of recognition'. It was published in 1970 and deconstructs what Lonzi argues as the patriarchal nature of Hegel's theories. The book was initially serialised between 1970 and 1972 and then collected in a unique volume in 1974. Each section reveals one stage of Lonzi's personal consciousness raising.

In The Clitoridian Woman and the Vaginal Woman (1971), through the analysis of Freud and Reich's psychoanalysis, Desmond Morris' paleoanthropology and the Kama Sutra, Lonzi claims that the myth of the vaginal orgasm serves the patriarchal model of the complementarity of women to men. If this complementarity between man and woman is permitted during procreation, it is not allowed during sexuality. Published at a time when women's sexuality and self-liberation were at the forefront of feminist discussion, the book significantly contributed to these debates.

== Death ==
Lonzi died on 2 August 1982, in Milan, at the age of 51.

== See also ==
- Feminism
- Feminist movements and ideologies
- Feminism in Italy
- Carla Accardi
- Separatist feminism
