= Gibellina =

- Comune
- Comune di Gibellina
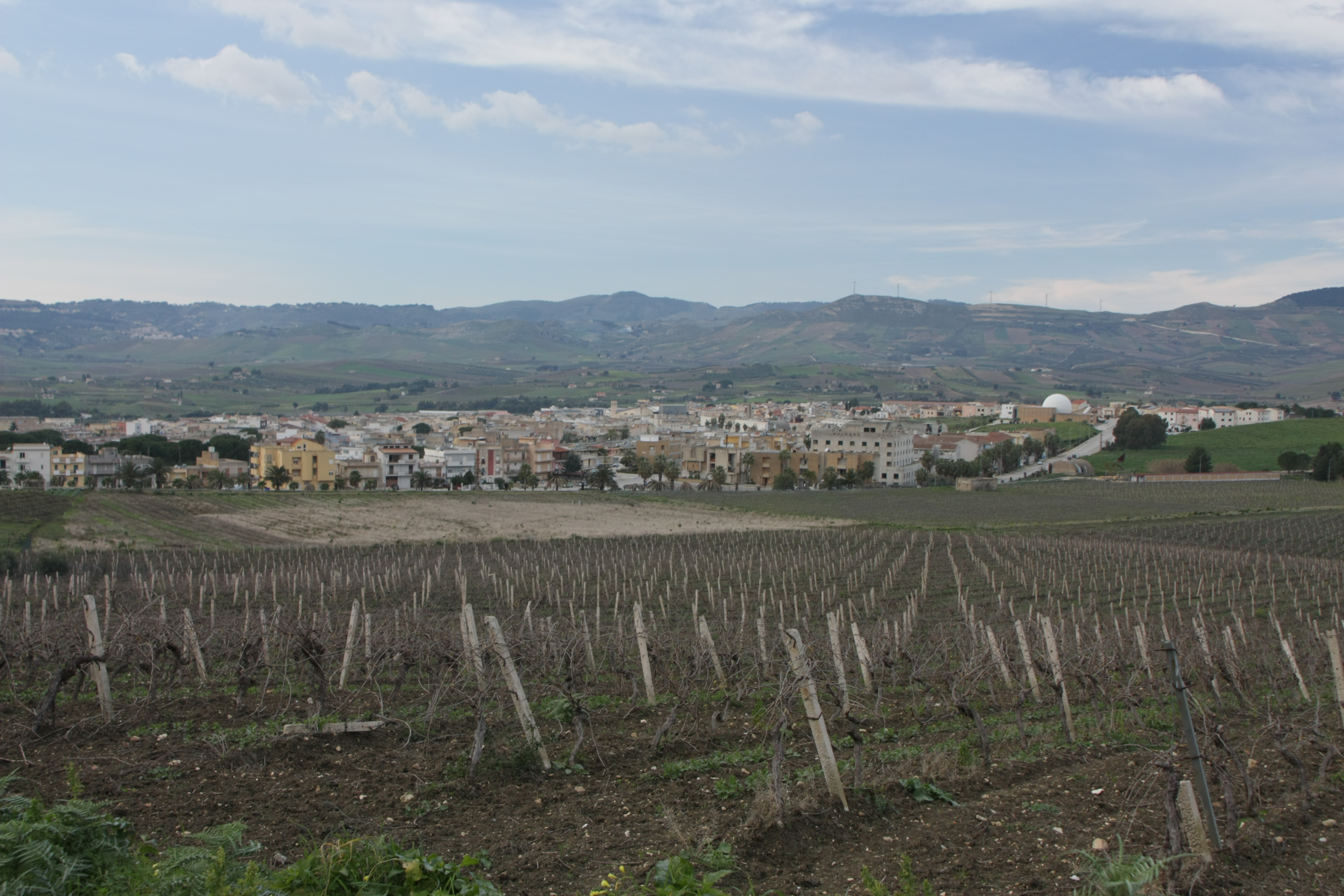
- View of Gibellina Nuova

- Coat of arms

- Location of Gibellina in Italy Gibellina (Sicily)
- Coordinates: 37°49′N 12°52′E
- Country: Italy
- Region: Sicily
- Province: Trapani (TP)

Government
  - Mayor: Salvatore Sutera

Area
  - Total: 46.57 km^{2} (17.98 sq mi)
- Elevation: 233 m (764 ft)

Population (2026)
  - Total: 3,636
  - Density: 78.08/km^{2} (202.2/sq mi)
- Demonym: Gibellinesi
- Time zone: UTC+1 (CET)
  - Summer (DST): UTC+2 (CEST)
- Postal code: 91024
- Dialing code: 0924
- Patron saint: Roch
- Saint day: 16 August
- Website: Official website

Gibellina (Sicilian: Jibbiḍḍina, Arabic: جبل صغير - "little mount") is a town and comune (municipality) in the Province of Trapani in the autonomous island region of Sicily in Italy. It has 3,636 inhabitants.

It was destroyed by the 1968 Belice earthquake. The new town, Gibellina Nuova (lit. 'New Gibellina), was rebuilt some 11 kilometres (7 mi) from the old one and it was designed by some of the most prominent artists and architects in Italy. They were summoned by Ludovico Corrao to provide works of art to the city in order to help build it up as an eccentric museum en plein air. One of them, the Italian sculptor Pietro Consagra, created a sculpture called Porta del Belice, or "Door to Belice", at the entrance. Consagra expressed on his deathbed a wish to be buried at Gibellina in July 2005.

The old town, now known as the Ruderi di Gibellina (as the ruins of the city are referred to), remained just as it was after the earthquake, like a ghost town until 1985. That year the Italian artist Alberto Burri began a project to cover the ruins in concrete, while preserving the streetscape. Known as Cretto di Burri, work on the project ceased in 1989, but was finally completed in 2015.

In 2024 it was proclaimed the Italian capital of contemporary art, the first Italian city with this title.

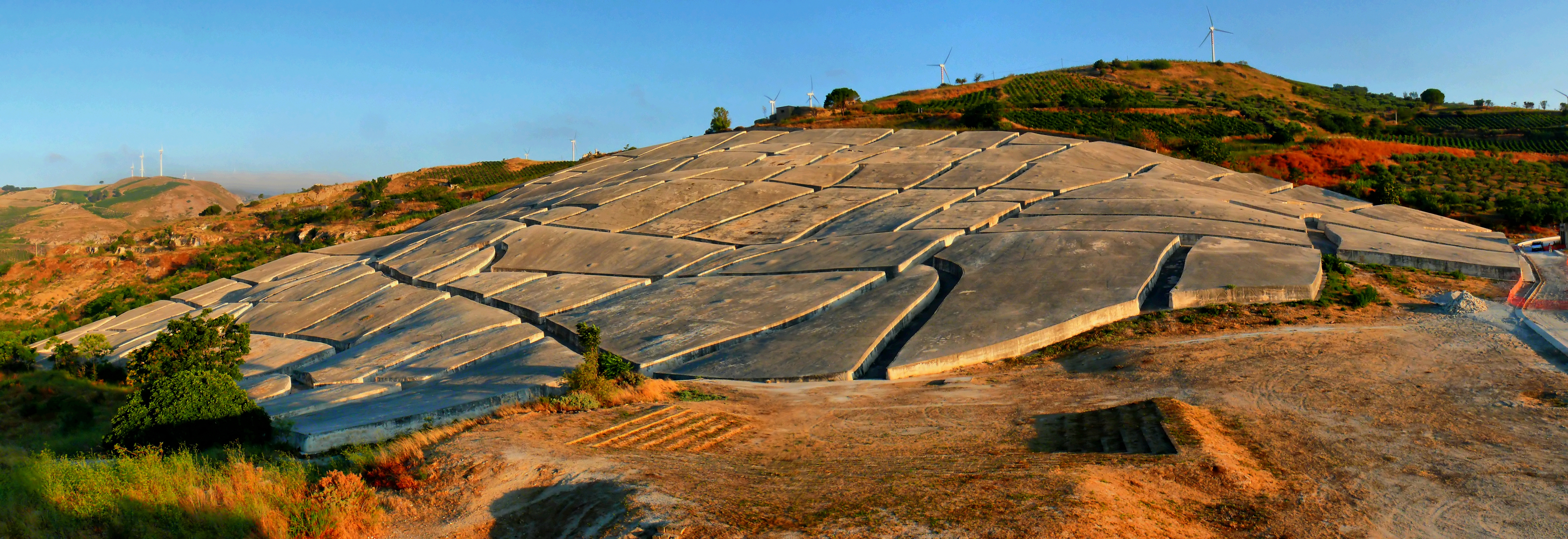
Cretto di Alberto Burri

== Demographics ==
As of 2026, the population is 3,636, of which 47.9% are male, and 52.1% are female. Minors make up 13.6% of the population, and seniors make up 29.3%.

Historical population

Year	Pop.	±%
1861	5,419	—
1871	5,842	+7.8%
1881	6,348	+8.7%
1901	6,266	−1.3%
1911	6,646	+6.1%
1921	6,364	−4.2%
1931	6,645	+4.4%
1936	6,788	+2.2%

Year	Pop.	±%
1951	6,899	+1.6%
1961	6,410	−7.1%
1971	4,865	−24.1%
1981	4,802	−1.3%
1991	5,027	+4.7%
2001	4,677	−7.0%
2011	4,264	−8.8%
2021	3,801	−10.9%

Source: ISTAT

=== Immigration ===
As of 2025, immigrants make up 5.6% of the population. The 5 largest foreign countries of birth are Romania, Venezuela, Morocco, Switzerland, and Tunisia.
