= Lavinio =

Coordinates: 41°26′50″N 12°37′42″E

- Frazione
- Location of Lavinio in Italy
- Country: Italy
- Region: Lazio
- Province: Rome Capital (RM)
- Comune: Anzio
- Time zone: UTC+1 (CET)
  - Summer (DST): UTC+2 (CEST)

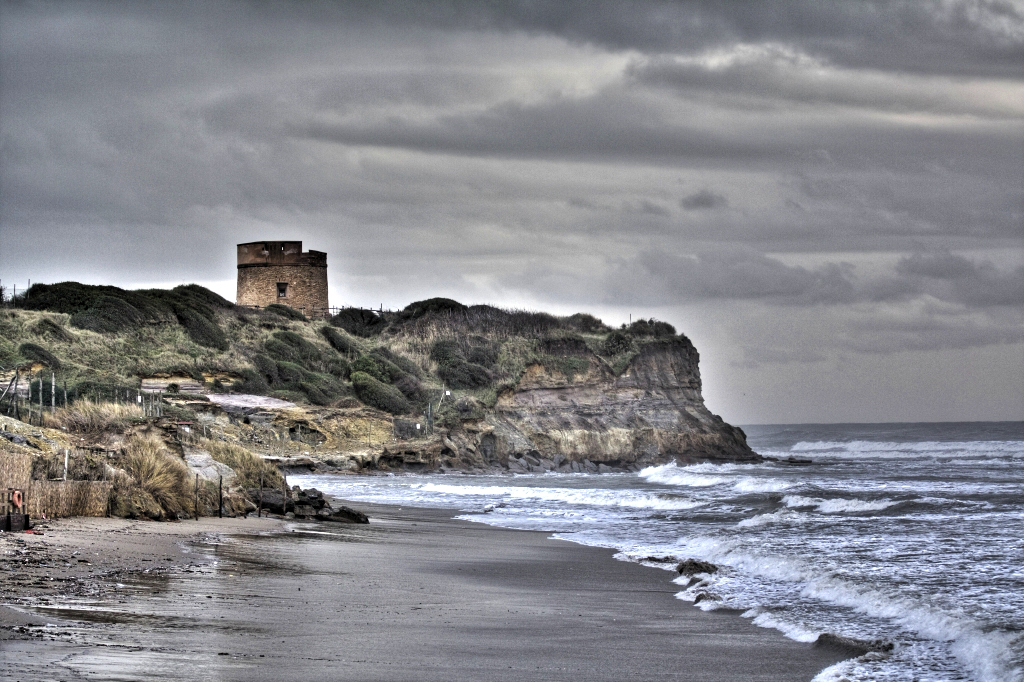
Regional Natural Reserve of Tor Caldara

Lavinio (Lido di Enea) is a small sea side tourist town in the Lazio region of Italy, 50 kilometres (31 mi) southwest of Rome. It is part of the municipality of Anzio.

== History ==
The name is derived from ancient Latin settlement of Lavinium, now 6.0 kilometres (3.7 mi) from the sea, and part of the nearby municipality of Pomezia. The foundation of Lavinium is mentioned prominently in the great Roman epic, the Aeneid by the Mantuan poet Publius Vergilius Maro (Virgil).

Lavinio adjoins the 42-hectare (104-acre) regional park of Tor Caldara, which features a medieval watch tower that was built in the Middle Ages to defend the area from the frequent incursions of Saracens and later from the Arabic pirates. In 1565 the tower was restored by Marcantonio Colonna, of the powerful noble family and large fief holders in Lazio and the Papal States. Sulfur was also mined there in the 16th century. In 1999 the ruins of an ancient Roman villa were discovered adjacent to the tower. The park features evergreen oak trees and Mediterranean vegetation that before commercial development extended along the whole coastline of the region. Characteristic springs and water courses can be found in the area.

During World War II, Allied soldiers fought and died on the beach and in the surrounding countryside of this town. On January 22, 1944 it was the approximate location of the British beachhead landing during the Battle of Anzio, part of the Allied advance to Rome. A greater number of American forces landed in Anzio and Nettuno, 10 kilometres (6 mi) south. A total of 110,000 troops landed. As a perennial memory, a marble stele, elevated and in front of the sea, remembers this sacrifice.
