= Alberto Burri =

Italian painter (1915–1995)

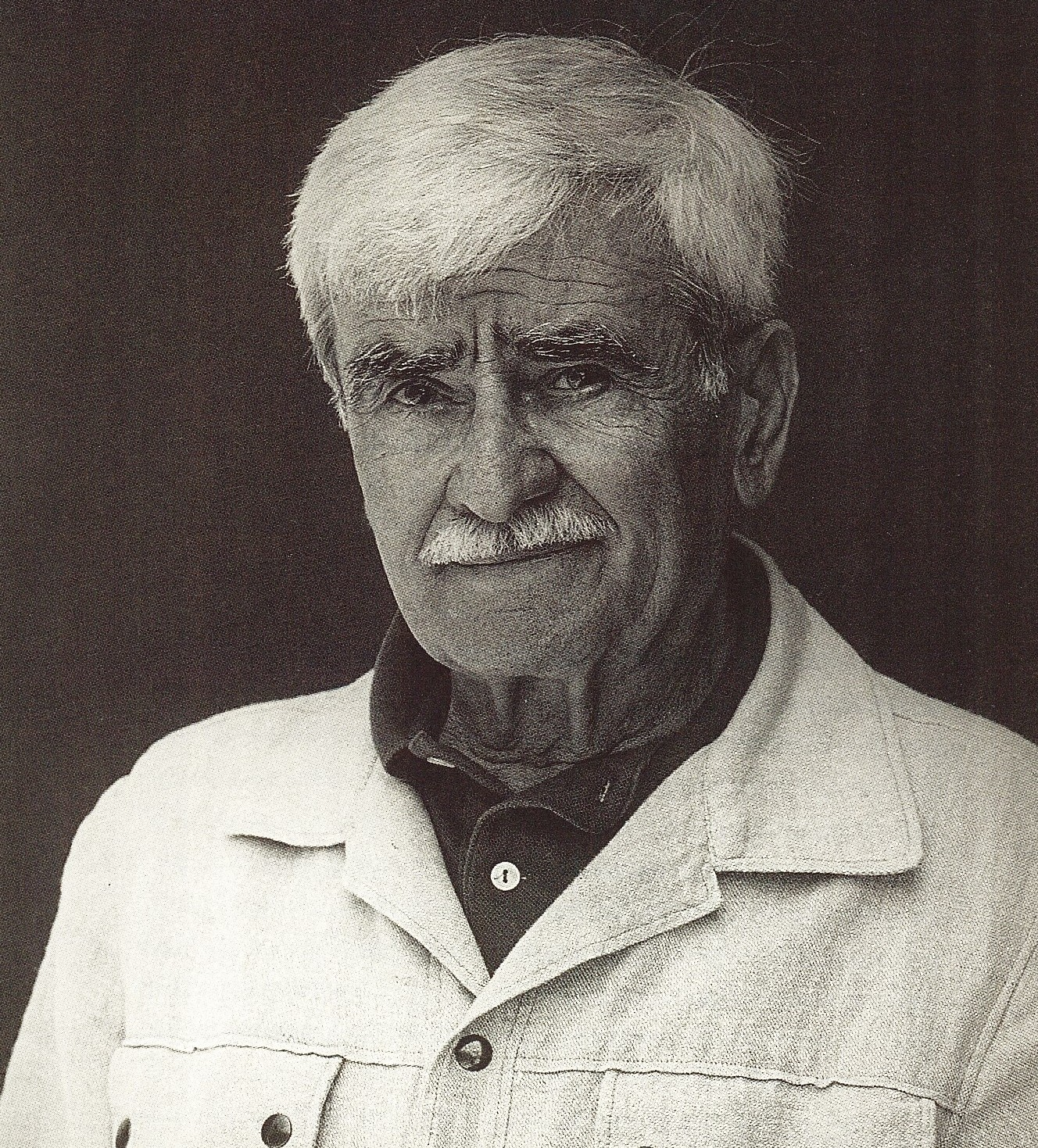
- Alberto Burri, photographed by Nanda Lanfranco
- Born: Alberto Burri; 12 March 1915; Città di Castello, at Perugia, Umbria
- Died: 13 February 1995 (aged 79); Nice, France
- Resting place: Città Di Castello cemetery
- Education: Informalism
- Known for: Painting, Land art, sculpture
- Notable work: Cretto di Burri
- Movement: Fluxus, Nouveau réalisme, Arte Povera
- Spouse: Minsa Craig (m. 1955)
- Awards: UNESCO Prize at the São Paulo Biennial (1959); Critics' Prize at the Venice Biennale (1960); Premio Marzotto (1964); Grand Prize at the São Paulo Biennial (1965); Feltrinelli Prize for Graphic Art (1973) honorary Degree Glasgow University (1991); Legion d'Honneur (1993); Italian Order of Merit (1994)

Alberto Burri (12 March 1915 – 13 February 1995; Italian pronunciation: [alˈbɛrto ˈburri]) was an Italian visual artist, painter, sculptor, and physician based in Città di Castello. He is associated with the matterism of the European informal art movement and described his style as a polymaterialist. He had connections with Lucio Fontana's spatialism and, with Antoni Tàpies, an influence on the revival of the art of post-war assembly in the United States (Robert Rauschenberg) as in Europe.

== Life ==
In the “Overrated and Underrated” column published by the American art magazine ARTnews, Alberto Burri's name is often mentioned. Carolyn Christov-Bakargiev mentioning him in the January 2005 issue for example.

If you look in magazines from the 1950s, Burri was sharing the same platform with most of the American Abstract Expressionists, yet for some reason he has fallen into almost total oblivion. Burri is enormously important in that postwar period and influential internationally... I don't think there would have been an Antoni Tàpies in Spain had there not been Burri.

— Carolyn Christov-Bakargiev, 2005

Alberto Burri was born on 12 March 1915 in Città di Castello, in Umbria to Pietro Burri, a Tuscan wine merchant, and Carolina Torreggiani, an Umbrian elementary school teacher. In 1935, Burri attended a government High school in Arezzo living as a boarder in a pension, and as his school reports noted, he studied Classics at a private school in Città di Castello. On his return from North Africa, Burri and his younger brother Vittorio were enrolled in the medical school in Perugia, and following his African adventure, Burri decided he wanted to specialize in tropical diseases. Burri graduated from medical school in 1940, and on 12 October that year, two days after Italy's entrance into World War II, with a precocious voluntary experience in the Italo-Ethiopian War, was then recalled into military service, and sent to Libya as a combat medic. Army records show that within 20 days of this order, Burri received a temporary discharge to allow him to complete his medical internship and gain the diploma to qualify as a medical doctor. Burri claimed he studied art history, because he wanted to be able to understand the works of art that surrounded him. He also studied Greek, a language in which he became proficient, and later in life was able to read and enjoy Classical Greek literature. On 8 May 1943 the unit he was part of was captured by the British in Tunisia and was later turned over to the Americans and transferred to Hereford, Texas in a prisoner-of-war camp housing around 3000 Italian officers, where he began painting. After his liberation in 1946, he moved to Rome and devoted himself exclusively to painting; his first solo exhibition took place at La Margherita Gallery in 1947. He then exhibited at the Marlborough Gallery in New York and at the Gallery de France in Paris.

Prevented from practicing his medical profession, Burri had the opportunity of choosing a leisure activity thanks to the YMCA Association. Using the limited amount of materials available in the camp he took on the activity of painting, at the age of almost 30 and without any kind of academic reference. Meanwhile, the tragic death of his younger brother Vittorio on the Russian front in 1943 had a strong impact on him. Shutting himself off from the rest of the world, and depicting figurative subjects on thick chromatic marks, he progressively realized the desire of abandoning the medical profession, in favor of painting. (Note: Brandi 1963. Originally painting signified for Burri a catharsis through action, occasioned by his situation as prisoner of war without sympathy for either of the struggle's main antagonists. The practice of medicine would have represented for him the survival of a past which the course of the events had definitely cut off.)

== Paintings ==
=== From abstraction to matter ===
Once Burri returned to Italy on 27 February 1946, his decision collided with the severe post–World War II recession and his parents' dissatisfaction. He moved to Rome as a guest of the violinist and composer Annibale Bucchi, his mother's cousin, who encouraged his activity as a painter.

While in Rome, he had the chance of establishing a contact with the few but very active institutions dedicated to painting, which were creating a new platform for visual arts after the war. (Note: Iori, Aldo (2016). "Rome 1947–1958: From Europe to America and Back".)

He remained a reserved artist, ceaselessly working and creating, initially in a small studio in Via Margutta but frequently moving out. As a matter of fact, Milton Gendel – an American journalist who visited Burri's studio in 1954 –, later reported: "The studio is thick-walled, whitewashed, neat and ascetic; his work is 'blood and flesh', reddened torn fabric that seems to parallel the staunching of wounds that Burri experienced in wartime.”

Burri's first solo figurative artworks exhibition took place on 10 July 1947 at the gallery-cum-bookshop La Margherita, in Rome, presented by the poets Leonardo Sinisgalli and Libero De Libero. However, Burri's artistic production flowed definitively into abstract forms before the end of the same year, the use of small format tempera resulting from the influence of such artists as Jean Dubuffet and Joan Miró, whose studio was visited by Burri during a trip to Paris in the winter of 1948.

==== Tars, Molds, Hunchbacks ====
Burri's artistic research became personal in a short time, between 1948 and 1950 he began experimenting with using unusual, 'unorthodox' materials such as tar, sand, zinc, pumice, and Aluminium dust as well as Polyvinyl chloride glue, this last material being elevated to the same importance as oil colors. During this artistic transition, the painter showed his sensitivity to the mixed-media type of abstraction of Enrico Prampolini, a central figure in Italian Abstract art. Nonetheless, Burri went one step further in his Catrami (Tars), presenting tar not as a simple collage material, but as an actual color which – by way of different lucid and opaque shades in monochrome black– blended itself with the totality of the painting. (Note: Burri did not begins with collage: the first pictures of '48 are all paintings. But in the earliest of them, the first Nero (Black) one, with a little blue square (and round and oval elements), the passage from shiny to opaque black acts not as a color but as material, like the right and wrong sides of a piece of satin. Burri intuition was decisive. For centuries, art history has posited a kind of duality in which matter served as artist's tool, as the factor that, to become form, must necessarily be subjected to an operation of sublimation. Burri's painting did not aim to substitute reality with the reality of the material, at the contrary, aimed to turn the material into a pure form.)

His 1948 "Nero 1" (Black 1) was later taken by the artist as initial milestone of his painting and established the prevalence of the black monochrome, which will be maintained as close identity throughout his career, alongside white, since Bianchi (Whites) 1949–50 series, and red.

The following series of Muffe (Molds) literally presented the spontaneous reactions of the materials employed, enabling matter to 'come to life' in drippings and concretions which reproduced the effects and appearance of real mold. In some artworks of the same period which he called Gobbi (Hunchbacks), Burri focused on the painting's spatial interaction, achieving another original outcome due to the incorporation of tree branches on the rear of the canvas which pushed two-dimensionality towards three-dimensional space.

In 1949 the critic Christian Zervos published the photo of a Catrame (exhibited in Paris the previous year) in the renowned Cahiers d'art.

Despite Burri's affinity with informalism and his friendship with Ettore Colla, which brought Alberto close to the Gruppo Origine (established and disbanded in 1951 by Colla himself, Mario Balocco and Giuseppe Capogrossi), the painter's artistic research appeared more and more solitary and independent.

=== Sacchi and the American emergence ===
Starting in 1952 Burri achieved a strong, personal characterization with the Sacchi (Sacks), artworks directly obtained from jute fabric widely distributed by the Marshall Plan: color almost entirely disappeared, leaving space for the surface material so that painting coincide with its matter in its total autonomy, as it was no more separation between painting surface and its form.

The formal artistic elegance and the spatial balances obtained through aeroform steams, craters, rips, overlapping color layers and different forms, differentiated Burri's art, founded on attentive reflections and precise calculations, from the impulsive gestures that characterized Action painting during the same period.

Burri offered an initial view of these peculiar elements in 1949, with SZ1 (acronym for Sacco di Zucchero 1 meaning Sack of Sugar, 1): the presence of a portion of the American flag contained in the artwork anticipated the use of the same subject made by pop art. In Burri's case, however, there were no social or symbolic implications, the painting's formal and chromatic balance being the only real focus.

==== Censorship and success ====
Burri's Sacchi did not win the public's understanding and were instead considered as extremely far from the notion of art. In 1952, year of his first participation at the Venice Biennale exhibition, the Sacks titled Lo Strappo (The Rip) and Rattoppo (Patch) were rejected.

Again, in 1959 a point of order of the Italian Parliament asked for the removal of one of the painter's works from the Galleria Nazionale d'Arte Moderna in Rome.

Burri's work received a different and positive consideration in 1953, when James Johnson Sweeney (director of the Solomon R. Guggenheim Museum) discovered Burri's paintings at the Obelisco Gallery in Rome, and subsequently introduced the artist's work to the United States, in a collective exhibition representative of the new European artistic tendencies. This encounter subsequently led to a life-long friendship with Sweeney becoming an active a proponent of Burri's art in leading American Museums and writing the very first monograph about the artist in 1955. During the same year Robert Rauschenberg visited the painter's studio two times: despite the linguistic differences between the two artists prevented them to talking to each other, Rauschenberg's visits provided substantial input for the creation of his Combine Paintings.

Burri's strong relationship with the United States became official when he met Minsa Craig (1928–2003), an American ballet dancer (student of Martha Graham) and choreographer whom he married on 15 May 1955 in Westport, Connecticut. They stuck together through thick and thin, for the rest of their lives.

=== Adoption of fire ===
After a few sporadic attempts, in 1953–54 Burri conducted a carefully planned experimentation with fire, through small combustions on paper, which served as illustrations for a book of poems by Emilio Villa. The poet was one of the first to understand the painter's revolutionary artistic potential, writing about it since 1951 and working with him to artist's books. He later recalled a common visit to an oil field (for a 1955 reportage for the magazine "Civiltà delle Macchine") as a strong influence for the artist's interest on the use of fire.

==== Combustions, Woods, Irons, Plastics ====
The procedure adopted for the Combustioni (Combustions) passed from paper to the Legni (Woods) around 1957, in thin sheets of wood veneer fastened to canvas and other supports.

In the same period Burri was also working on the Ferri (Irons), creations made out of metal sheets cut, and welded by Blow torch, to aim the general balance of the elements. The best known application of this procedure was reached in the Plastiche (Plastics) during the Sixties, when a gradual critic openness towards Burri's art showed up in Italy as well.

Grande Bianco Plastica (Large White Plastic) (1964) at Glenstone in 2023

The blowtorch was only apparently a destructive device. Indeed, the craters modeled by the flame on cellophane, black, red or transparent plastic or on the Bianchi Plastica (White Plastic) series, in which the transparent plastic is laid on a white or black support, were lightly directed by the painter's blowing. The balances of the matter were thus highlighted once again, in a sort of 'defiance' towards of flame's randomness on the one hand, and in a sort of attempt to 'dominate chance', intrinsic to Burri's philosophy, on the other.

=== From Cretto to Cellotex ===
From 1963 on, Burri and his wife started spending their winters in Los Angeles. The painter progressively detached himself from the city's artistic community, deeply focusing on his own work. During his recurrent trips to Death Valley National Park, the artist found in the natural cracking of the desert the visual spur which led him, starting from 1973, to create Cretti (Cracks) developing the use of the crackled paint effect of his 1940's artworks.

Employing a special mixture of kaolin, resins and pigment, the painter dried its surface with the heat of an oven. Burri arrested the heating process at the desired moment using a PVA glue layer, thus obtaining greater and lesser cracking effects, which were always balanced thanks to the painter's extensive knowledge of chemistry.

==== Grande Cretto at Gibellina ====
Burri reproduced the procedure used for the Cretti, either black or white, also in sculpture, on large extensions in the University of California, Los Angeles and Naples (Museo di Capodimonte) Grandi Cretti (Large Cracks) made of baked clay (both 49 x 16) and, most importantly, in the vast cement covering of the Cretto di Burri at Gibellina, upon the ruins of the old small Sicilian town destroyed by the 1968 earthquake. Began in 1984 and interrupted in 1989, the work was completed in 2015, for the artist's centenary of birth. It is one of the largest works of art ever realized, extending over an area of approximately 85,000 square meters. Its white concrete covering expands over the town, following the old street map in long arterial roads and corridors, which are walkable, thus symbolically bringing the devastated town back to life.

==== Cellotex and the large cycles of paintings ====
During the Seventies Burri's art saw a gradual transition towards wider dimensions, while retrospectives followed one another around the world. The great solo exhibition crossing the United States in 1977–78 and ending at the Solomon R. Guggenheim Museum in New York is one example.

In the 1979 cycle of paintings called Il Viaggio (The Journey) Burri retraced, through ten monumental compositions, the key moments of his artistic production.

The privileged material during this phase is Celotex (the author added an l to its name), an industrial mixture of wood production scraps and adhesives, very often used in the making of insulating boards. Up to then, the painter had used this material in his previous works since the early 1950s as a support for his acetate and acrylic works.

After that Cellotex was used for cyclical series conceived as polyptych on a dominant and clear geometrical structure, through extremely thin scratched shades or juxtapositions of smooth and rough portions like Orsanmichele (1981), or in black monochromes variations like Annottarsi (Up to Nite, 1985), as well as in multicolored forms like Sestante (Sextant, 1983) or the homage to the gold of Ravenna mosaics in his last Nero e Oro (Black and Gold) series.

== Sculpture and set design ==
Burri's entire artistic production was conceived by the author as an inseparable whole of form and space, both in painting and in sculpture. An example is the recurrent motif of the archivolt, viewed in its plain form in painting and in perspective in such iron sculptures as Teatro Scultura – a work presented at 1984 Venice Biennale –, and in the 1972 Ogive series in ceramics.

The strong continuity of Burri's sculptural works with his paintings can also be seen in the Los Angeles UCLA and Naples Capodimonte ceramic Grandi Cretti (with the help of the long collaborator ceramist Massimo Baldelli), or in the Grande Ferro (Large Iron) exhibited in Perugia on the occasion of the 1980 meeting between the artist and Joseph Beuys.

The Large Cretto at Gibellina doesn't properly fall under the category of land art, but it has features combining architecture, sculpture and space. Other sculptures on iron are permanently held in Città di Castello museums, Ravenna, Celle (Pistoia), Perugia and Milan, where the rotating wings of the Teatro Continuo (Continuous Theatre) is both real scenic space and sculpture, employing the Sforza Castle park as natural backcloth.

=== Theatre sets ===
Theater had a privileged role in Burri's artistic production. Though in isolated interventions, the painter worked in the fields of prose, ballet and opera. In 1963 Burri designed the sets for Spirituals, Morton Gould's ballet at La Scala, in Milan. The painter's Plastiche emphasized the dramatic force of such plays as the 1969 Ignazio Silone stage adaptation in San Miniato (Pisa) and Tristan and Iseult, performed in 1975 at the Teatro Regio in Turin.

In 1973 Burri designed sets and costumes for November Steps, conceived by his wife Minsa Craig, with a score by Toru Takemitsu. The ballet was interacting with an early example of visual art by a film clip depicting how the Cretti progressively came into being.

== Graphic work ==
Burri never considered graphic art of secondary importance to painting. He participated intensively in the experimentation of new printing techniques as the 1965 reproduction of the Combustioni – in which the husband and wife team of Valter and Eleonora Rossi perfectly succeeded in mimicking the effect of burning on paper –, or the irregular Cretti cavities (1971) with the same printers.

Further innovative developments can be found in the silk screens Sestante (1987–89) – with the help of Burri's old friend and collaborator Nuvolo – to the Mixoblack series (1988), created with the Los Angeles print workshop Mixografia using marble dust and sand to create printing surfaces with certain textural three-dimensional effects.

A telling fact is that Burri used the money from the Feltrinelli Prize for graphics – awarded to him in 1973 by the Accademia dei Lincei – to promote and support the restoration of Luca Signorelli's frescos in the small oratory of San Crescentino, only few kilometers far from Burri's country house in Città di Castello; a further example of how modern and contemporary are mentally close in Burri's art.

== Legacy ==
Alberto Burri died childless on 13 February 1995 in Nice, in the French Riviera, where he had moved for the ease of living and because of a pulmonary emphysema.

Just before his death, the painter was awarded the Legion of Honour and the title Order of Merit of the Italian Republic, besides being named an honorary member of the American Academy of Arts and Letters. His graphic series Oro e Nero (Gold and Black), was donated by the artist among others at the Uffizi Gallery in Florence 1994, by which time he was already beginning to be considered more of a 'classical' than a 'contemporary' artist.

Alberto Burri's art captured the interest of many contemporary artist colleagues, from Lucio Fontana and Giorgio Morandi to Jannis Kounellis, Michelangelo Pistoletto and Anselm Kiefer, who recognized Burri's greatness – and, in some cases, influence – time and time again.

=== Foundation and the museums ===
In accordance with the painter's will, the Fondazione Palazzo Albizzini was established in Città di Castello in 1978, in order to copyright Burri's own work. The first museum collection, inaugurated in 1981, is the one situated inside the Albizzini Renaissance apartment building. The 15th century Patrician house, belonged to the patrons of Raphael's Wedding of the Virgin, was refurbished by the architects Alberto Zanmatti and Tiziano Sarteanesi in accordance with Burri's own plans.

The second collection is that of the Città di Castello former tobacco drying sheds, an industrial structure gradually abandoned during the 1960s and inaugurated in 1990, expanding over an area of 11,500 square meters. At present, the structure features the totality of large cycles of painting by the artist, monumental sculptures and, from March 2017 on, the painter's entire graphic production.

The structure's black exterior and the particular space adaptations represent one last attempt by Burri to create a total work of art, in continuity with the idea of formal and psychological balance he constantly pursued.

== Critical appraisal ==
Alberto Burri is recognized as a radical innovator of the second half of the twentieth century, as a precursor of the solutions found by such artistic movements as Arte Povera, Neo-Dada, Nouveau réalisme, Postminimalism and process art, leaving open many critical interpretations and methodological interpretations of his work.

In his 1963 monograph, Cesare Brandi highlighted the essentialness of Burri's painting and his rejection of both decorative detail and the historical avant-gardes' (e.g. Futurism) provocations, favoring a new approach through an 'unpainted painting' concept.

On the other hand, Enrico Crispolti interpreted Burri's employment of material from an existential point of view – as James Johnson Sweeney similarly had in the very first monograph on Burri published in 1955 – implying a criticism towards a certain post-war ethical drift.

Pierre Restany considered him as a "special case" in the Minimalism history, having been "the monumental outsider and genial precursor at the same time". Maurizio Calvesi adopted a psychoanalytic reading during the years, finding "ethical values" in his art, identifying at the same time the Renaissance origins of Burri's homeland: Piero della Francesca would have inspired in Burri the sense of space and solemnity of the masses which the painter then transferred on the combusted woods or the worn-out sacks.

More recently, Burri's position has been reevaluated thanks to the 2015 major retrospective exhibition Alberto Burri: The Trauma of Painting curated by Emily Braun for the Solomon R. Guggenheim Museum and to the 2016 collective exhibition Burri Lo spazio di Materia tra Europa e USA edited by the current Foundation chairman Bruno Corà, which foregrounded the radical change in traditional Western painting and modern collage brought about by Burri, while also focusing on his 'psychological' recovery of classical painting's formal balances alive.

Among the many historical readings, Giulio Carlo Argan's judgment (written in the 1960 Venice Biennale catalogue) remains emblematic: "For Burri we must speak for an overturned Trompe-l'œil, because it is no more painting to simulate reality, but it is reality to simulate painting."

== Exhibitions ==
Burri's career began in Rome with a first solo exhibition in 1947 at La Margherita bookshop, owned by Irene Brin, where he presented his first abstract works the following year. Brin and her husband, Gaspero del Corso founded the Obelisco Gallery, the first art gallery to open in Postwar Rome, featuring the 1952 solo exhibition Muffe e Neri (Molds and Blacks) and the first Combustions in 1957. The Burri's first exhibition with the Sacchi was presented by the poet Emilio Villa at the Origine Foundation in 1952, in confirmation of his increasingly original production. The Ferri (Irons) were held at Galleria Blu in Milan.

From 1953 on, Burri regularly exhibited his works in the United States, at the Allan Frumkin Gallery (Chicago), the Stable Gallery and the Martha Jackson Gallery in New York. In the same year, the director and curator of Guggenheim Museum James Johnson Sweeney included Burri in the landmark exhibition Younger European Painters: A Selection bringing his work to focus in the international community.

Burri's initially seesawing relationship with the Venice Biennale marked its turning point in 1960, when he was offered his first solo area by Giulio Carlo Argan. In 1962 Cesare Brandi presented the Plastiche at the Marlborough Fine Art in Rome. The first anthological retrospectives were held around this time and in the following decade, as the solo exhibitions at the Musée National d'Art Moderne in Paris (1972), the one in Francis of Assisi Sacred Convent (1975) and the great traveling exhibit which started at the UCLA's Frederick S. Wight Gallery in Los Angeles, moved to the Marion Koogler McNay Art Institute in San Antonio (Texas) and ended in 1978 at the Solomon R. Guggenheim Museum.

From 1979 on, the Large Cycles of paintings on Cellotex dominated Burri's entire subsequent production, which was conceived for big spaces such as cathedrals (like the 1981 Cycle in Florence titled Gli Orti) or former industrial complexes, like the Giudecca Isle's ex-boatyards in Venice, where he exhibited the chromatic series Sestante. In 1994, Burri presented the cycle titled Burri The Athens Polyptych. Architecture with Cactus for the exhibit curated by Giuliano Serfafini at the National Gallery (Athens), and then at the Italian Institute of Culture in Madrid (1995).

The 1996 posthumous anthological exhibition at Palazzo delle Esposizioni (Rome) was successfully repeated at Lenbachhaus (Munich) and at the Centre for Fine Arts, Brussels. In 2015–16 the major retrospective exhibition The Trauma of Painting organized by Emily Braun at the Solomon R. Guggenheim Museum in New York (later at the Kunstsammlung Nordrhein-Westfalen, Düsseldorf in 2016) received much international attention to the painter's art.

At the conclusion of the centenary of Alberto Burri's birth, the exhibition titled Burri Lo spazio di materia tra Europa e USA curated by Bruno Corà established a comparison between the epigones of 20th century material art. The exhibit was held in Città di Castello, in the exhibition space of the former tobacco drying sheds which, since 2017, house the painter's graphic collection.

== Art market ==
At a Sotheby's London sale of works from a private collection in the north of Italy, Burri's Combustione legno (1957) was auctioned for 3.2 million in 2011. On 11 February 2014 Christie's established the artist's record with the work Combustione Plastica, sold for £4,674,500 (estimate range of £600,000 to £800,000). The work (signed and dated on the back) in plastic, acrylic and combustion (4 ft x 5 ft) was made between 1960 and 1961.

The artist's record was established in 2016 in London when, during the evening dedicated by Sotheby's to the 1959 contemporary Sacco e Rosso, the artwork was sold for over £9 million, thus doubling the previous record.

== Tributes ==
Alberto Burri's art has inspired many Italian directors, among which Michelangelo Antonioni, who drew inspiration from the painter's material research for his 1964 Red Desert.

Composer Salvatore Sciarrino wrote an homage to commemorate the painter's passing in 1995, commissioned by Città di Castello's Festival delle Nazioni. For the same festival the former tobacco drying sheds became the setting of a composition by Alvin Curran in 2002.

The Large Cretto at Gibellina has functioned several times as a set for the Orestiadi Festival and as set for a 2015 performance by artists Giancarlo Neri and Robert Del Naja (Massive Attack). The 1973 ballet November Steps, with Burri's sets and costumes, was proposed again in 2015 by the Guggenheim Museum, New York. In 2016 choreographer Virgilio Sieni created the work Quintetti sul Nero, inspired by the Umbrian master. In 2017 John Densmore (The Doors) performed in front of the Grande Nero Cretto (Large Black Crack) at UCLA, Los Angeles during the event Burri Prometheia.

Throughout the years, fashion designers have drawn inspiration from Burri, from Roberto Capucci, with his 1969 item of clothing Omaggio a Burri which has asymmetric features recreating the Cretti effects, up to Laura Biagiotti for her (last) 2017 collection.

In 1987 Burri created the official 1990 FIFA World Cup posters. The Umbria Jazz Festival used the Sestante series for the 2015 edition poster, celebrating the artist's centenary of birth.

== Documentaries ==
- 1960 Carandente, Giovanni. Burri, Rome
- 1974 Simongini, Franco. Brandi, Cesare. Alberto Burri: l'avventura della ricerca (RAI/TV)
- 1976 Quilici, Folco. Brandi, Cesare. L'Italia vista dal cielo. Umbria (Esso)
- 1995 Rubini, Rubino. Burri (P.P.M., Rome)
- 2011 Gambino, Davide. Guarneri, Dario. Alberto Burri, La vita nell'arte (Centro sperimentale di Cinematografia sezione documentario Sicilia)
- 2015 Severi, Luca. Alberto Burri e Piero della Francesca le due rivoluzioni (Zen Europe/Sky)
- 2015 Noordkamp, Petra. Il Grande Cretto di Gibellina (Solomon R. Guggenheim Foundation)
- 2015 Valeri, Stefano. Alberto Burri Il tempo dell'arte (Fondazione Palazzo Albizzini Collezione Burri)
- 2016 Moneta, Matteo. Alberto Burri e la sua città (3D Produzioni/ Fondazione Palazzo Albizzini Collezione Burri)
- 2017 Sterparelli, Giuseppe. VARIAZIONI: a visual polyphony

== Bibliography ==
- Brandi, Cesare (1963). Burri. Rome: Editalia.
- Braun, Emily, with Fontanella, Megan, & Stringari, Carol (2015). Alberto Burri: The Trauma of Painting. New York: Guggenheim Museum Publications. ISBN 9780892075232
- Calvesi, Maurizio (1971). Alberto Burri. Milan: Fratelli Fabbri Editori.
- Calvesi, Maurizio (1975). Alberto Burri. New York: Abrams Books. ISBN 978-0-810-90232-9.
- Calvesi, Maurizio (1959). "Quadrum 7: International Magazine of Modern Art". Brussels: L'Association pour la Diffusion Artistique et Culturelle (A.D.A.C.).
- Carandente, Giovanni (2007). "Burri: Memories of a Friendship 1948–1988", in Palumbo (Piero), Burri. Una vita. Milan: Electa. 2007, pp. 176–183.
- Corà, Bruno (2015). Sarteanesi, Chiara (ed.). Alberto Burri General Catalogue. Vol. I Painting 1945–1957. Vol. 1. Città di Castello. ISBN 978-88-99523-04-6.
- Corà, Bruno (2015). Tomassoni, Italo (ed.). Alberto Burri General Catalogue. Vol. II. Painting 1958–1978. Vol. 2. Città di Castello. ISBN 978-88-99523-04-6.
- Corà, Bruno (2015). Bertelli, Carlo (ed.). Alberto Burri General Catalogue. Vol. III. Painting 1979–1994. Vol. 3. Città di Castello. ISBN 978-88-99523-04-6.
- Corà, Bruno (2015). Olivieri, Rita; Pirovano, Carlo; Sarteanesi, Tiziano (eds.). Alberto Burri General Catalogue. Vol. IV Tempera, Drawing, Architecture, Sculpture, Theatre, Set Design 1946–1994. Vol. 4. Città di Castello. ISBN 978-88-99523-04-6.
- Corà, Bruno (2015). Sarteanesi, Chiara (ed.). Alberto Burri General Catalogue. Vol. V Graphic Works 1949–1994. Vol. 5. Città di Castello. ISBN 978-88-99523-04-6.
- Corà, Bruno (2015). Alberto Burri General Catalogue. Vol. VI. Chronoligical Repertoire 1945–1994. Vol. 6. Città di Castello. ISBN 978-88-99523-04-6.
- Corà, Bruno (2016). Burri Lo spazio di materia tra Europa e USA [Burri: the space of matter: between Europe and the USA] (in Italian). Città di Castello. ISBN 978-88-940639-8-1.
- De Sabbata, Massimo (2008). Burri e l'Informale (in Italian). Milano-Firenze: Il Sole 24 Ore-E-ducation.
- Gendel, Milton (December 1954). "Burri Makes a Picture" (PDF). ARTnews. 8. Archived from the original on 23 January 2022.
- Kimmelman, Michael. 1995. "Alberto Burri, Prominent Artist Of Postwar Italy, Is Dead at 79" New York Times (16 February).
- Lux, Simonetta (1984). Alberto Burri: dalla pittura alla pittura. Rome: Petruzzi Editore.
- Mansoor, Jaleh (2 September 2016). Marshall Plan modernism: Italian postwar abstraction and the beginnings of autonomia. Durham: Duke University Press. ISBN 978-0-8223-6245-6.
- Melandri, Luisa, with Duncan, Michael (2010). Combustione, Alberto Burri and America. Los Angeles: Santa Monica Museum of Art. Exhibition catalogue. ISBN 9780974510873
- Nordland, Gerald (1977). Alberto Burri: A Retrospective View, 1948–1977. Los Angeles: Frederick S. Whight Art Gallery Editions.
- Grohmann, Will (1959). L'arte dopo il 1945. Milan: Il saggiatore.
- Palumbo, Piero (2007). Burri Una Vita. Milan: Electa. ISBN 978-8-837-05930-9.
- Perniola, Mario (1996). "Burri e l'estetica". Milan: Mondadori Electa.
- Rozner, Judith (2015). Alberto Burri: The art of the matter (PDF) (PhD thesis). Melbourne: University of Melbourne.
- Rubiu, Vittorio (1975). Alberto Burri. Torino: Einaudi.
- Sarteanesi, Nemo; Steingraber, Erich (1980). Il viaggio. Città di Castello: Electa.
- Sauvage, Tristan (1957). Pittura italiana del dopoguerra. Milan: Schwarz.
- Serafini, Giuliano (2015). Burri: matter first. Milan: Giunti. ISBN 978-88-09-81594-0.
- Sweeney, James Johnson (1955). Burri. Rome: L'Obelisco.
- Tolomeo, Maria Grazia, & Christov-Bakargiev, Carolyn (1997). Burri Retrospektiv 1915–1995. Milan: Electa. Exhibition catalogue.
- Trucchi, Lorenza (2007). "Nobilis et Humilis" in Palumbo (Piero), Burri. Una vita, Electa, Milan, 2007, pp. 184–185.
- Zorzi, Stefano (1995). Parola di Burri [Word of Burri: the thoughts of a lifetime] (in Italian). Torino: U. Allemandi. ISBN 88-422-0545-1.
- Zorzi, Stefano (2016). Parola di Burri: i pensieri di una vita [Word of Burri: the thoughts of a lifetime] (in Italian). Milano: Electa. ISBN 978-88-918-0935-3.
