= Ugo Attardi =

Italian painter (1923–2006)

Ugo Attardi (12 March 1923 in Sori – 20 July 2006 in Rome) was an Italian painter, sculptor and writer.

== Biography ==
Attardi moved from Genoa to Rome in the early 1950s, where he formed the group Forma 1 together with other artists such as Carla Accardi, Pietro Consagra, Piero Dorazio, Mino Guerrini, Concetto Maugeri, Achille Perilli, Antonio Sanfilippo and Giulio Turcato.

His sculpture of Ulysses is now permanently installed in Battery Park City in New York

== Main exhibitions ==
=== Solo ===
- 1976 – Palazzo dei Diamanti, Ferrara
- 1981 – Rotonda della Besana, Milan
- 1982 – Galerie Faris, Paris
- 1983 – Centre Georges Pompidou, Paris
- 1984 – Galleria MR, Rome
- 1985 – Palazzo Barberini, Rome
- 1991 – Palazzo della Penna, Perugia
- 1995 – Reale Albergo dei Poveri, Palermo
- 1995 – John F. Kennedy International Airport, New York
- 1995 – Spazio Italia Art Gallery, New York
- 1996 – Alitalia Headquarters, Rome
- 2000 – Centro J. L. Borges, Buenos Aires
- 2000 – Galleria Pavilion, Córdoba
- 2003 – Palazzo dei Normanni, Palermo
- 2005 – Loggiato San Bartolomeo, Palermo
- 2011 – Convento del Carmine, Marsala

=== Collective ===
- 1947 – Art Club, Rome
- 1948 – Art Club, Rome
- 1952 – 26° Venice Biennale, Venice
- 1954 – 27° Venice Biennale, Venice
- 1959 – Rome Quadriennale, Rome
- 1965 – Rome Quadriennale, Rome
- 1978 – 38° Venice Biennale, Venice
- 1982 – FIAC Grand Palais, Paris
- 1986 – Rome Quadriennale, Rome
- 1992 – Rome Quadriennale, Rome
- 2012 – Ulisse Gallery, Rome, Italy
