= Carla Accardi =

Italian abstract painter (1924–2014)

- Carla Accardi in her studio in Rome, 1976
- Born: 9 October 1924; Trapani, Sicily, Kingdom of Italy
- Died: 23 February 2014 (aged 89); Rome, Italian Republic
- Education: Accademia di Belle Arti di Palermo
- Known for: Painter
- Movement: Abstraction, Feminism

Carla Accardi (9 October 1924 – 23 February 2014) was an Italian abstract painter associated with the Arte Informale and Arte Povera movements, and a founding member of the Italian art groups Forma (1947) and Continuità (1961).

== Biography ==
Born in the city of Trapani in Sicily, Carla Accardi studied at the Accademia di Belle Arti in Palermo and Florence prior to moving to Rome in 1946. She founded the art group Forma in 1947 with fellow artists Pietro Consagra (1920-2005), Ugo Attardi (1923-2006), Antonio Sanfilippo (1923-1980), Giulio Turcato (1912-1995), Piero Dorazio (1927-2005), Achille Perilli, and Mino Guerrini, an Italian screenwriter, director, actor and painter. Accardi married Sanfilippo in 1949. Work in Forma was inspired by futurism. Forma 1 had their first exhibition in Rome in 1947. Forma later helped lead to the development of movimento arte concreta. Accardi's work became well known in France where the art critic Michel Tapie took an interest in her work.

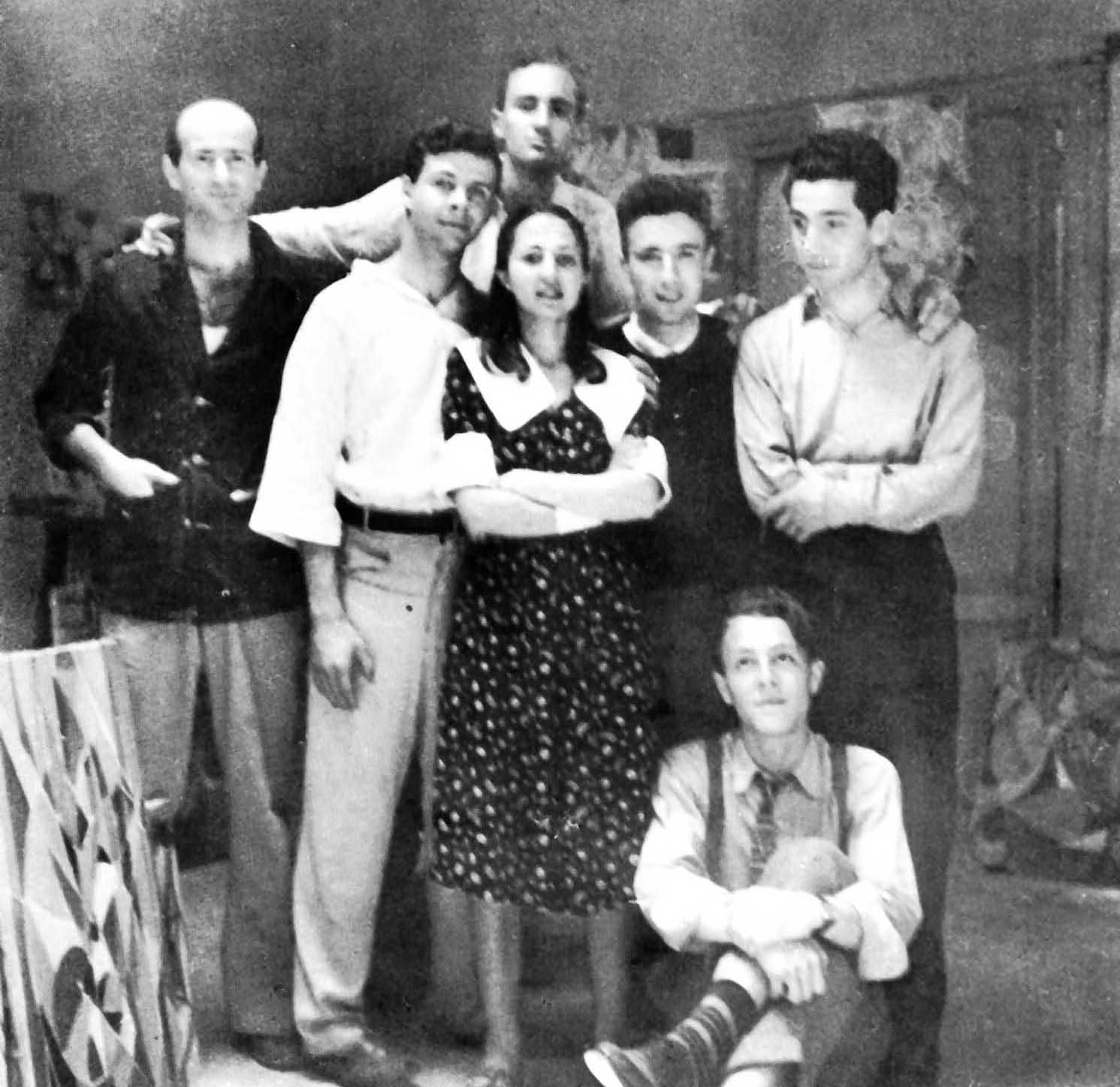
Forma 1 artists: Pietro Consagra, Mino Guerrini, Ugo Attardi, Carla Accardi, Achille Perilli, Carla's husband Antonio Sanfilippo, Giulio Turcato, and Piero Dorazio (sitting below).

== Work ==
Accardi's earliest paintings were self-portraits, but her move to Rome prompted more experimental work. In 1946, she joined the Italian avant-garde movement. In the 1960s, Accardi started making her first paintings in black and white, focusing on monochromy, color, and shapes. The inspiration for her black and white paintings came from visiting Paris during her one-woman shows. There the contrasting static and energetic work of Alberto Magnelli and Hans Hartung inspired her to begin painting in black and white. These black and white paintings were referred to as her “Integrazione series”.

She transitioned to vibrant and intense colors in the mid-1960s, with Stella and II Stella (Star I and II). She also began using a clear plastic material called Sicofoil, which she describes as "like something luminous, a mixing and a fluidity with the surrounding environment: perhaps in order to take away the totemic value of the painting." She used this material to make Tendas, or tents of clear plastic, which she adorned with painted forms. After being exposed to these different forms of art, such as black and white painting and Sicofoil, she adopted a greater variety of color once she reverted to canvas painting.

During the late 1970s, she became part of the feminist movement with critic Carla Lonzi. Together, they founded Rivolta femminile in 1970, one of Italy's first feminist groups and publishing houses. Accardi is considered a key member of the Italian avant-garde and her artwork influenced the Arte Povera movement in the late 1960s. Accardi's first solo exhibition in the United States was in 2001 at MoMA PS1.

Known works include: Bianco nero su turchese (1960), Azzurroviolarancio (1962), Bozetto Bronzo (1964), Segni Rosa and Verde (both 1968), Segni Rosa (1971), Per L'Infinito lo Scirocco (1987), Apparenti Tinte (1990), Grigio Rosso (1992), Verde Rosso (1997), Viola Arancio (2005), Blu (2007), Rosso du Grigio (2008), Senza Titulo (2011), L'Enigma dell'ora, Melodie Fluvial and Mistero en forme (2012).

Accardi's work was included in the 2021 exhibition Women in Abstraction at the Centre Pompidou.
