= Pietro Consagra =

Italian sculptor (1920–2005)

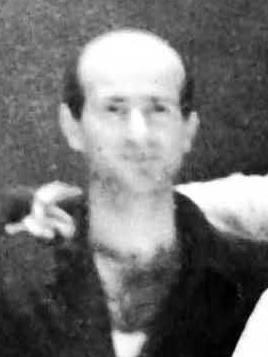
- Consagra in 1947
- Born: 6 October 1920; Mazara del Vallo, Province of Trapani, Sicily
- Died: 16 July 2005 (aged 84); Milan
- Known for: sculpture
- Movement: Forma 1; Continuità
- Website: pietroconsagra.it

Pietro Consagra (6 October 1920 – 16 July 2005) was an Italian sculptor. In 1947 he was among the founding members of the Forma 1 group of artists, who advocated both Marxism and structured abstraction.

== Life ==
Consagra was born on 6 October 1920 in Mazara del Vallo, in the province of Trapani in south-western Sicily, to Luigi Consagra and Maria Lentini. From 1931 he enrolled in a trade school for sailors, studying first to become a mechanic, and later to become a captain. In 1938 he moved to Palermo, where he enrolled in the liceo artistico; despite an attack of tuberculosis, he graduated in 1941, and in the same year signed up at the Accademia di Belle Arti, where he studied sculpture under Archimede Campini. After the Invasion of Sicily and the Allied occupation of Palermo in 1943, Consagra found work as a caricaturist for the American Red Cross club of the city; he also joined the Italian Communist Party. Early in 1944, armed with a letter of introduction from an American officer, he travelled to Rome. There he came into contact with the Sicilian artist Concetto Maugeri, and through him with Renato Guttuso, who was also Sicilian and who introduced him to the intellectual life of the city and to other artists such as Leoncillo Leonardi, Mario Mafai and Giulio Turcato. Consagra signed up at the Accademia di Belle Arti di Roma in September 1944 and studied sculpture there under Michele Guerrisi, but left before completing his diploma.

== Work ==
In 1947, with Carla Accardi, Ugo Attardi, Piero Dorazio, Mino Guerrini, Achille Perilli, Antonio Sanfilippo and Giulio Turcato, Consagra started the artist's group Forma 1, which advocated both Marxism and structured abstraction.

Steadily Consagra's work began to find an audience. Working primarily in metal, and later in marble and wood, his thin, roughly carved reliefs, began to be collected by Peggy Guggenheim and other important patrons of the arts. He showed at the Venice Biennale eleven times between 1950 and 1993, and in 1960 won the sculpture prize at the exhibition.

During the 1960s he was associated with the Continuità group, an offshoot of Forma I, and in 1967 taught at the School of Arts in Minneapolis. Large commissions allowed him to begin working on a more monumental scale, and works of his were installed in the courtyard of the Foreign Ministry in Rome and in the European Parliament, Strasbourg. His work is found in the collections of The Tate Gallery, London, in Museo Cantonale d'Arte of Lugano and the Museum of Modern Art, Paris, and the National Gallery of Art in Washington, D.C..

Consagra returned to Sicily where he sculpted a number of significant works during the 1980s. With Senator Ludovico Corrao, he helped created an open-air museum in the new town of Gibellina, after the older town had been destroyed in the earthquake of 1968. Consagra designed the gates to the town's entrance, the building named "Meeting" and the gates to the cemetery, where he was later buried.

== Writings ==
In 1952 Consagra published La necessità della scultura ("the need for sculpture"), a response to the essay La scultura lingua morta ("sculpture, a dead language"), published in 1945 by Arturo Martini. Other works include L'agguato c'è ("the snare exists", 1960), and La città frontale ("the frontal city", 1969). His autobiography, Vita Mia, was published by Feltrinelli in 1980.

== Reception ==
In 1989 a substantial retrospective exhibition of work by Consagra was shown at the Galleria Nazionale d'Arte Moderna in Rome; in 1993 a permanent exhibition of his work was installed there. In 1991 his work was shown in the Hermitage Museum in St. Petersburg. In 2002 the Galerie der Stadt Stuttgart opened a permanent exhibition of his work.
