= Giulio Turcato =

Italian painter

Giulio Turcato (16 March 1912, Mantua – 22 January 1995, Rome) was an Italian artist, belonging to both figurative and abstract expressionist currents.

== Biography ==
Giulio Turcato was born in Mantua. He attended the Accademia di Belle Arti di Venezia in the early 1930s before moving to Milan and finding work in the firm of the architect Giovanni Muzio in 1937. A chronic pulmonary illness forced him to frequent stays in sanatoriums. Having taken up painting, he found inspiration in the Cubist art of Pablo Picasso, eventually developing an abstraction with expressionist overtones. He participated to the 23rd Venice Biennale in 1942. A few months later he moved to Rome and joined the Italian resistance movement.

At the end of the War, Turcato reprised his artistic activities. He was one of the signatories of the manifesto of the Nuova Secessione Artistica Italiana in 1946, and a founding member of the Marxist-leaning, abstract art group Forma 1 in 1947, together with Ugo Attardi, Pietro Consagra, Piero Dorazio, Mino Guerrini, Achille Perilli and Antonio Sanfilippo. In 1948, he helped founding the Fronte Nuovo delle Arti. The decision of the Venice Biennale to dedicate a room exclusively to his work at the 29th edition in 1958 contributed to his international standing. In 1959 Turcato was invited to Documenta II. In 1961 he joined the Continuità group.

== Other projects ==
Media related to Giulio Turcato at Wikimedia Commons
