= Luciano Pistoi =

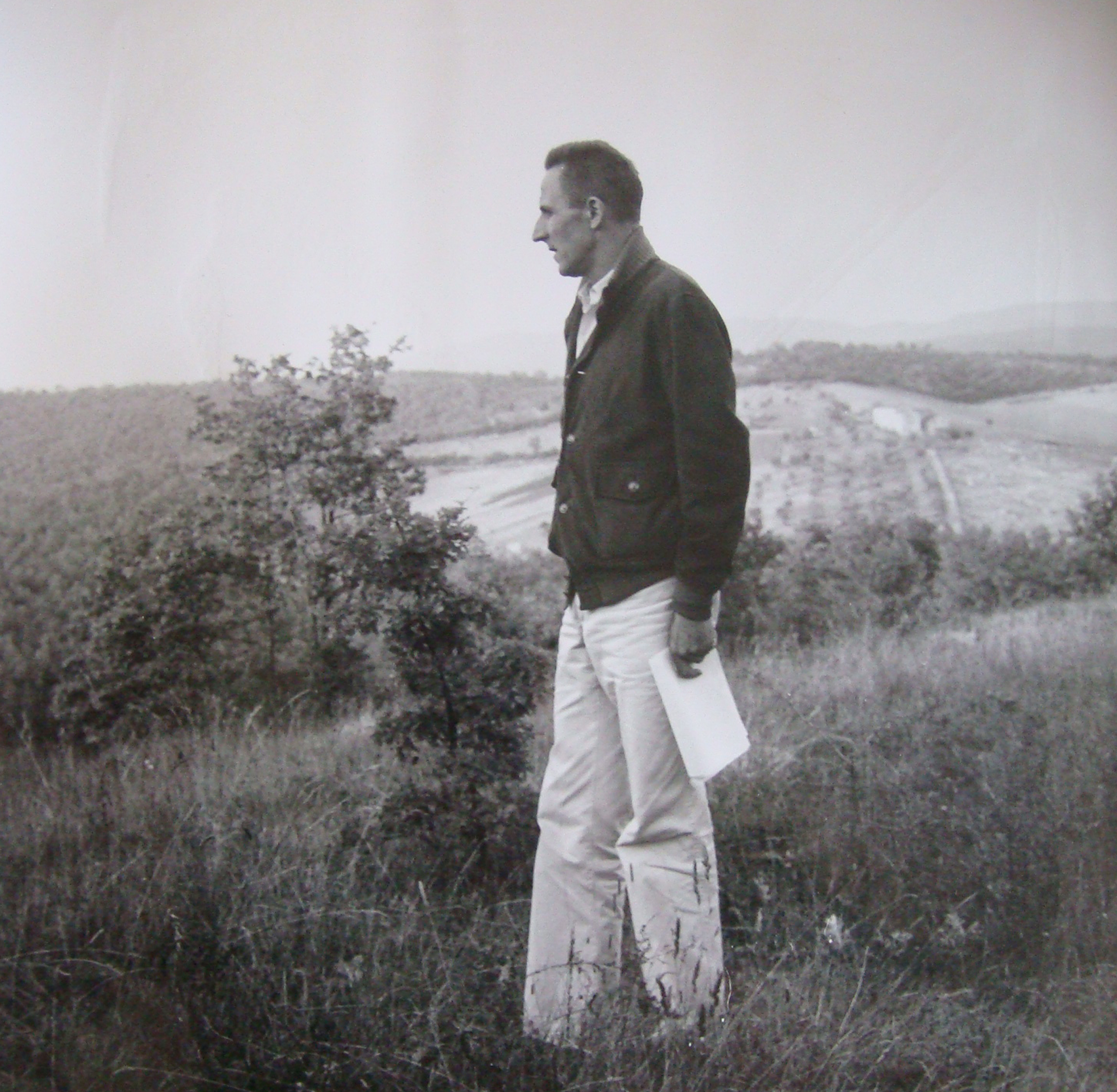
Luciano Pistoi, Poggio a Spandole, Siena 1980s

Luciano Pistoi (Rome, January 30, 1927 – Radda in Chianti, February 19, 1995) was an Italian art critic, dealer, journalist, publisher, promoter and organizer of cultural events. He is considered one of the most prominent figures in the postwar Italian art world.

== Turin ==
Luciano Pistoi was born in Rome into a family of Tuscan origins. He moved with his father Silvio, a railway worker, his mother Concetta, and his brothers Ennio and Mario Pistoi to Turin where he attended secondary school. He frequented the studio of painter Pippo Oriani where he developed a passion for Futurism and began a brief career as a painter that ended in the late 1940s. During WWII he joined the clandestine Italian Communist Party (PCI). In 1944 he was arrested at Porta Nuova train station together with his brother and imprisoned in the Ferrante Aporti juvenile detention facility. Upon turning eighteen he was transferred to Le Nuove prison, where his cellmate was painter to be Mario Merz. After the war he continued his painting activity by attending the studio of Mattia Moreni. In 1947 he married Mila Leva, his school companion, with whom the following year he had a son, Pablo, who died tragically in England in July 1983 after falling from a cliff.

He started working as an art critic for the newspaper L'Unità as a proofreader and then in the 1950s became the official art critic, collaborating regularly under the editorship of Luciano Barca, and later became the editor of the cultural page, which he managed until 1957. While remaining in the PCI (Italian Communist Party), in 1956 he co-signed with Italo Calvino, Diego Novelli and other Turin intellectuals a dissent document against the Soviet invasion of Hungary. At the same time, he organized an exhibition at the Mastarone Gallery of the painter Fillia, a key figure of the Second Futurism movement in Turin. Pistoi's interest and voracious curiosity led him to found - together with Elio Benoldi, and several Turin-based art overs and collectors including Leopoldo Bertolé and Benedetto Delmastro - the Association of Figurative Arts, with the goal of promoting debate and information on new artistic trend. He founded the magazine and publishing company Notizie.

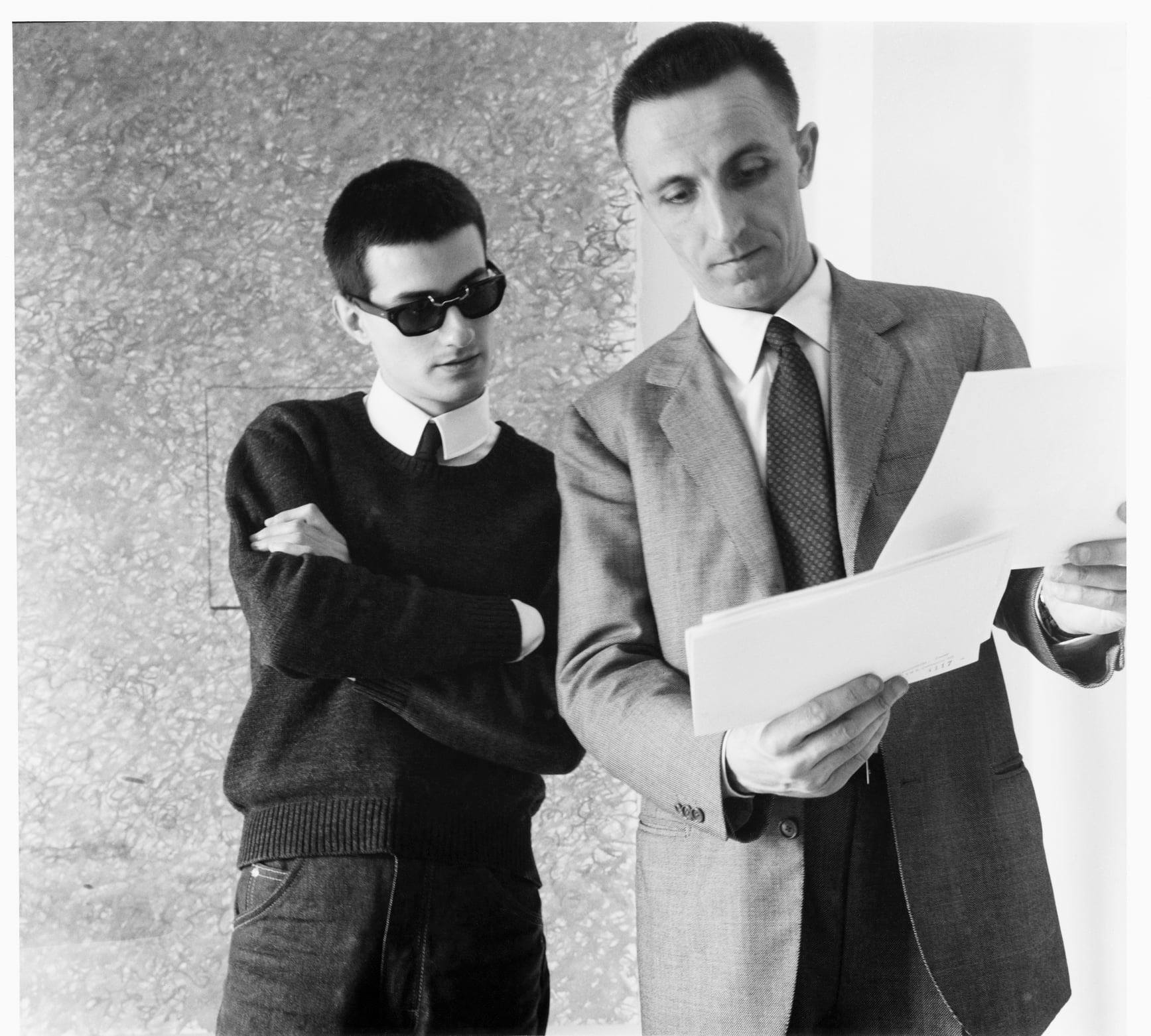
Giulio Paolini and Luciano Pistoi, Turin 1965

In 1957 he opened the Galleria Notizie in via Carlo Alberto with an exhibition of three young painters - Mario Merz, Piero Ruggeri, and Sergio Saroni - titled "Three New Aformalist Painters." In March of the same year he inaugurated an exhibition of sculptures by Franco Garelli, in whose studio in December he would present for the first time in Italy paintings, temperas, and engravings by the German artist Wols (Alfred Otto Wolfgang Schulze). In 1959 he moved the gallery space to Piazza Cesare Augusto, where, among others, he organized the first European exhibition of the Japanese group Gutai and the exhibition "Arte Nuova" (New Art) in collaboration with the French critic Michel Tapié. in 1968 to Via Assietta, and finally to Via Santa Maria until his departure for Rome in 1975. He presented artists such as Jean Fautrier, Jackson Pollock, Alberto Burri, Lucio Fontana, Jean Dubuffet, Olga Jevric, Franz Kline, Francis Bacon, George Mathieu, Norman Bluhm, Mark Tobey, Luigi Spazzapan, Imai, Antoni Tàpies, Carla Accardi, Pinot Gallizio, Cy Twombly, Asger Jorn, Shiraga, Francis Picabia, Jean Paul Riopelle, Sam Francis, Wassily Kandinsky, Louise Nevelson, Salvatore Scarpitta, Fausto Melotti, Giacomo Balla, Pablo Picasso, Paul Klee, Josef Albers, Victor Brauner, Wifredo Lam, Henri Michaux, Luciano Fabro, Mario Nigro, Kenneth Noland, Frank Stella, Arman, Jesús Rafael Soto, Tano Festa, Giulio Paolini, Antonio Carena, Mario Schifano, Michelangelo Pistoletto, and Mario Merz. He also collaborated with many international art dealers, including Arne Glimcher, Ernst Beyeler, Michel Tapié - with whom he organized the first European exhibition of the Japanese Gutai group - Mario Tazzoli, Italo Calvino, the French critic Pierre Restany, Carla Lonzi, Paolo Fossati, Willem Sandberg, Yvon Lambert, Paul Maenz, Paolo Sprovieri, Plinio De Martiis, Gasparo del Corso, and Alexander Jolas.

From the early 1960s Pistoi was interested in work by young artists like Piero Manzoni, Pino Pascali, Giulio Paolini, Luciano Fabro and Christo, parallel to his focus on protagonists of the European avant-gardes such as Francis Picabia, René Magritte, Fernand Léger, and Yves Tanguy.

In 1967 he began a relationship with Eva Menzio, daughter of the painter Francesco Menzio, who separated from the critic Paolo Fossati and moved with her children Filippo and Caterina to live with Pistoi. In 1972 their son Francesco was born.

== Rome and Tuscany ==
In 1975 Pistoi, Eva Menzio, and their three children moved to Rome, where he began a decade-long collaboration with the Galleria dell'Oca run by Luisa Laureati, assisted by her husband, the art historian Giuliano Briganti.

Pistoi's activity during his Roman period was varied and continued the interests that had shaped his temperament and Turin-formed character. He remained an art entrepreneur committed to rediscovering and reinterpreting artists of the generation preceding his own, while at the same time looking toward the generation of artists just beginning to work. The first exhibition he organized at the Galleria dell'Oca together with Luisa Laureati was dedicated to Fausto Melotti, an artist he had already helped bring to public attention with Paolo Fossati's assistance in Turin. This was followed by further exhibitions that on one hand sought to recover significant figures from the international artistic panorama of the interwar years — such as Filippo de Pisis, Francis Picabia, Roberto Matta, Giacomo Balla, Carlo Carrà, Giorgio Morandi, Federico Zandomeneghi, Alberto Savinio, Gino Severini, Ferruccio Ferrazzi, René Magritte, Antonio Donghi, Tullio Garbari, Felice Casorati, Ottone Rosai, Sanfilippo, Alberto Magnelli, to name but a few — and on the other hand were aimed at the discovery and promotion of young Italian artists such as Sandro Chia, Enzo Cucchi, Salvo, Luigi Ontani, Bruno Innocenti, and Giuseppe Salvatori.

In 1982 Pistoi embarked on a new venture and a new exhibition activity in Tuscany, thanks to a house given to the family by Eva Menzio's father near Radda in Chianti. Pistoi conceived a festival that would last ten years, bringing together an impressive roster of artists, gallerists, architects, and international actors from different generations in a series of events staged in the medieval village of Volpaia in the Chianti hills. It was the first time in Italy that a cultural event of this level had been organized with private funds — a model that would be widely imitated in Italy and beyond in the years to come. The festival began with two years devoted to rediscovering bodies of work by two artists, Ardengo Soffici and Alberto Magnelli. Pistoi then invited, year after year, leading figures from the international art scene: artists, gallerists, critics, and collectors.

The list is extensive and includes, among others, artists such as Christo, Enrico Castellani, Richard Long, Gianni Piacentino, Maurizio Mochetti, Giulio Paolini, Carla Accardi, Mario Nigro, Giulio Turcato, Luciano Fabro, Salvatore Scarpitta, Combas, Mario Merz, Michelangelo Pistoletto, Emilio Vedova, Mimmo Paladino, Alberto Burri, Luigi Ontani, James Brown, Milan Kunc, Luigi Mainolfi, Vettor Pisani, Salvo; gallerists such as Ernst Beyeler, Heinz Berggruen, Rudolf Zwirner, Eva Menzio, Cleto Polcina, Paolo Sprovieri, Piero Fedeli, Carlo Catelani, Ghiringhelli, Sperone, Michaud, Marconi, Giordano Raffaelli, Filippo Fossati, Marsilio Margiacchi; critics such as Giuliano Briganti, Achille Bonito Oliva, Renato Barilli, Alessandra Borgogelli, Mauro Pratesi, Giacinto di Pietrantonio, Corrado Levi, Loredana Parmesani, Tommaso Trini, Angela Vettese, Laura Cherubini; and it served as a launching platform for a generation of young artists, including Mario Airò, Francesco Arena, Stefano Arienti, Maurizio Benatello, Luigi Carboni, Antonio Catelani, Umberto Cavenago, Marco Colazzo, Daniela De Lorenzo, Mario Dellavedova, Federico Fusi, Carlo Guaita, Felice Levini, Giovanni Lillo, Andrea Massaioli, Davide Nido, Athos Ongaro, Alfredo Pirri, Nicola Ponzio, Pierluigi Pusole, Luisa Raffaelli, Giuseppe Salvatori, Andrea Santarlasci, Sergio Sarra, Luigi Stoisa, and Bruno Zanichelli.

In 1985 Aldo Rossi built a small chamber theater among the vineyards, and in the Commenda of Sant'Eufrosino an exhibition was on view featuring works by Lucio Fontana, Alberto Burri, Roberto Matta, Marc Chagall, Giorgio Morandi, Alberto Magnelli, Mario Sironi, Massimo Campigli, Renato Guttuso, Virgilio Guidi, Lorenzo Viani, Giulio Turcato, Giuseppe Capogrossi, Cy Twombly, Pompeo Borra, Afro Basaldella, Salvo, Antonio Donghi, and others. In the meantime his relationship with Eva Menzio had ended and Pistoi became partners with Annie Ratti, with whom he had two children: Viva and Sebastiano.

In 1988 in Florence, with the aim of "promoting and relaunching the quality art market in Italy," Pistoi organized a unique invitation-only art fair in the magnificent setting of the Fortezza da Basso, which he titled "The Most Beautiful Gallery in Italy." It was in reality a large exhibition hosting a selection of the most innovative galleries on the Italian art scene, each presenting the best of the artistic research of those years. Despite enormous success with the public and critics, due to constant attacks from anonymous Florentine colleagues, the fair closed its doors after two years of activity, before it could grow into an international fair.

In July 1994, Pistoi together with Giuliano Briganti and Luisa Laureati organized the exhibition Affinità. Five Artists in San Gimignano, inviting Luciano Fabro, Jannis Kounellis, Eliseo Mattiacci, Nunzio, and Giulio Paolini to intervene not with a simple site-specific work, but with a piece that would go beyond the classical conception of sculpture and engage in dialogue with the natural and urban environment. Fabro and Nunzio chose intimate spaces for their works, almost niches; Giulio Paolini placed a sundial on the exterior wall of the church of Sant'Agostino; Mattiacci countered the structural verticality of San Gimignano with a horizontal installation; Jannis Kounellis created an alternative bell tower alongside the existing one.

The project conceived by Pistoi, Briganti, and Laureati was intended to become an ongoing cultural proposition that would expand over time to other towns, engaging internationally renowned artists in solo appearances in neighboring villages. The idea was picked up with convenient timing by several assistants, who founded the Associazione Culturale Continua and transformed it into the event that would go on to thrive under the title "Arte all'Arte."

Luciano Pistoi died at his home in Santa Maria Novella, Radda in Chianti, on 19 February 1995.

== Bibliography ==
- "Arte Nuova / Art Today / Art Nouveau. Esposizione Internazionale di Pittura et Scultura Ikebana di Sofu Teshigahara, a cura di Tapié Michel; Dragone Angelo; Pistoi Luciano; Tominaga Coichi, Circolo degli Artisti, Palazzo Graneri, Torino 1959
- "Il Secondo Futurismo", Rivista Notizie diretta da Luciano Pistoi, pubblicato in occasione della mostra alla Galleria Blu di Milano con Testo di Enrico Crispolti, Milano 1960
- "Antonio Donghi", a cura di Luciano Pistoi, Stamperia Il Globo, Bologna, 1982. (Catalogo Galleria dell'Oca, Roma: Galleria Eva Menzio, Torino, testo di Antonello Trombadori
- "Luigi Ontani:Facciapule", con un testo di Goffredo Parise. Torino, Umberto Allemandi, ‘Eulogie’ 1. Collana a cura di Eva Menzio, Massimo Minini, Luciano Pistoi, 1983.
- "Le città del mondo, Levini, Ontani, Salvatori, Salvo", Torino, Umberto Allemandi, ‘Eulogie’ 1. Collana a cura di Eva Menzio, Massimo Minini, Luciano Pistoi, 1984
- "Omaggio a Magnelli", Catalogo mostra Firenze, Presentazione di Giorgio Morales e Luciano Pistoi, Testi di Maurizio Calvesi, Sergio Salvi, Armando Brissoni e Anne Maissonier, Mazzotta, Milano 1988
- Adalgida Lugli, "L'uomo che guarda al futuro ha lo sguardo lieto", Il Giornale dell'Arte, Vernissage, marzo 1992
- Luciano Pistoi, Corrado Levi, Giulio Paolini, “Ultime: Luciano Pistoi 1986 : New Polverone”, Fattoria Editrice, 1986.
- Franco Fanelli “Il mercante d'arte è il consigliere del principe", Allemandi, Torino 2005 - ISBN 978-88-422-1351-2
- Mirella Bandini, Maria Cristina Mundici, Maria Teresa Roberto, "Luciano Pistoi, Inseguo un mio disegno", Hopefulmonster Editore, Torino 2008 - ISBN 978-88-7757-222-6

== Gallery ==
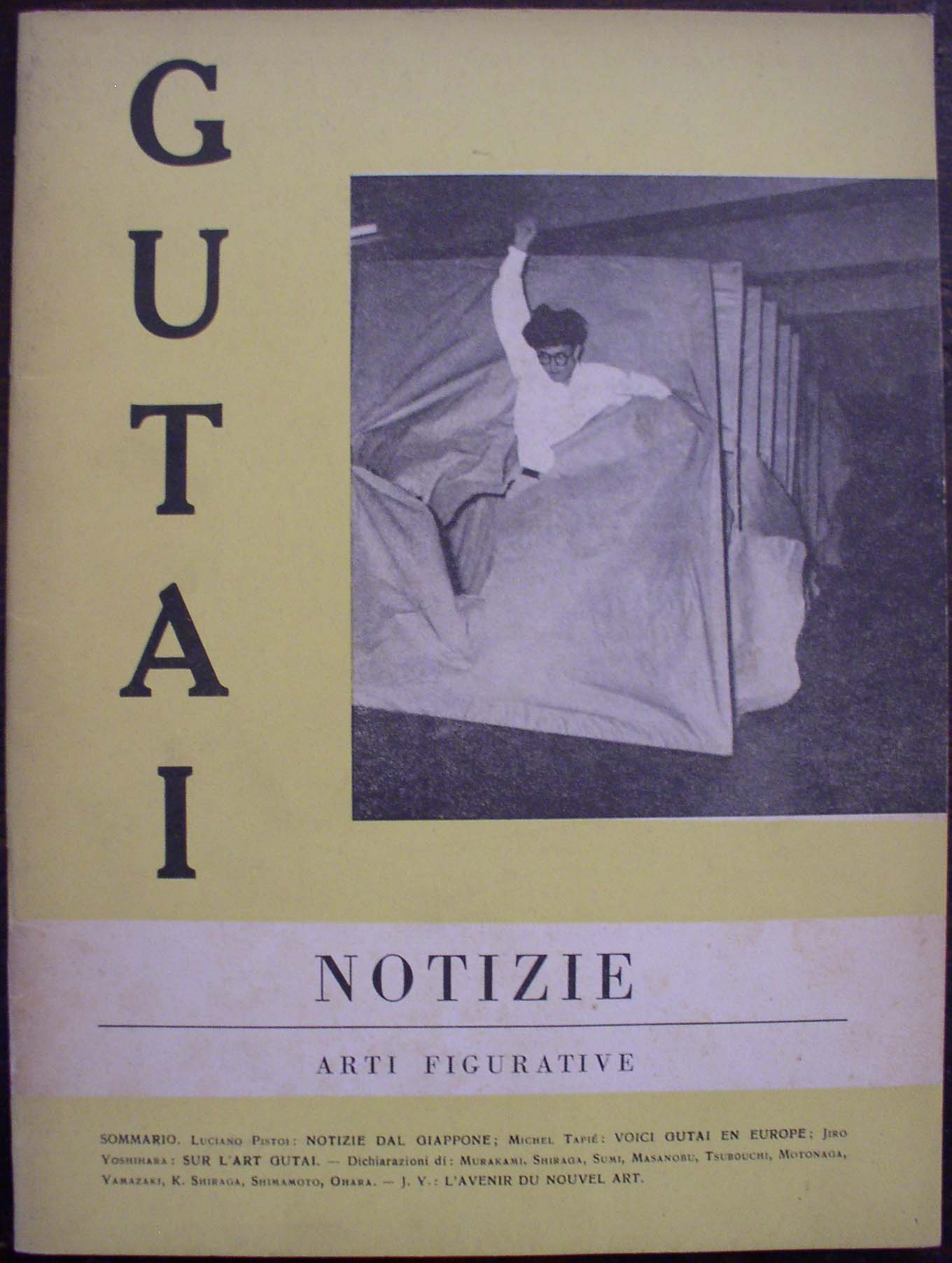
Notizie Gutai 1959

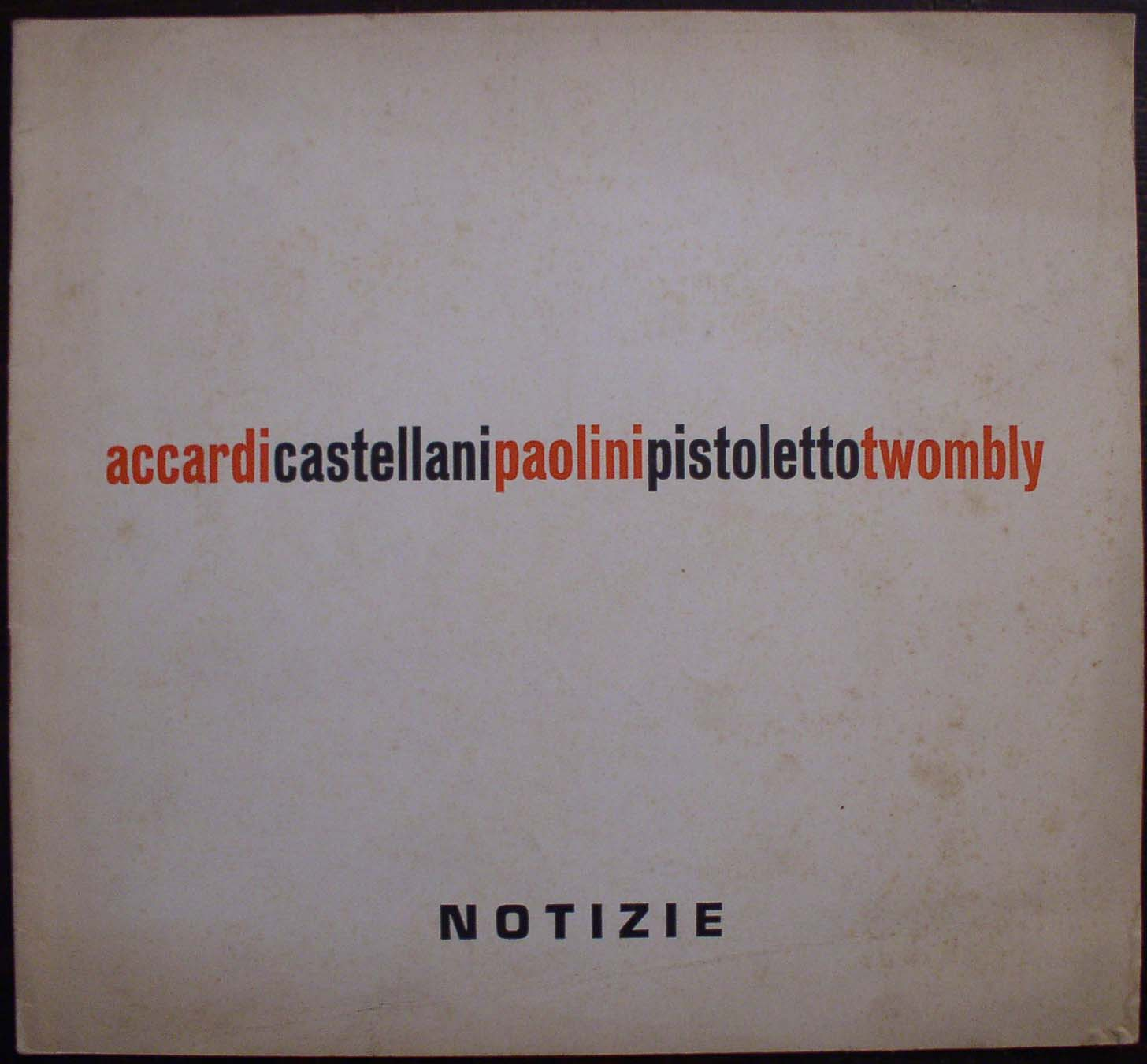
Carla Accardi, Enrico Castellani, Giulio Paolini, Michelangelo Pistoletto, Cy Twombly, Galleria Notizie 1963

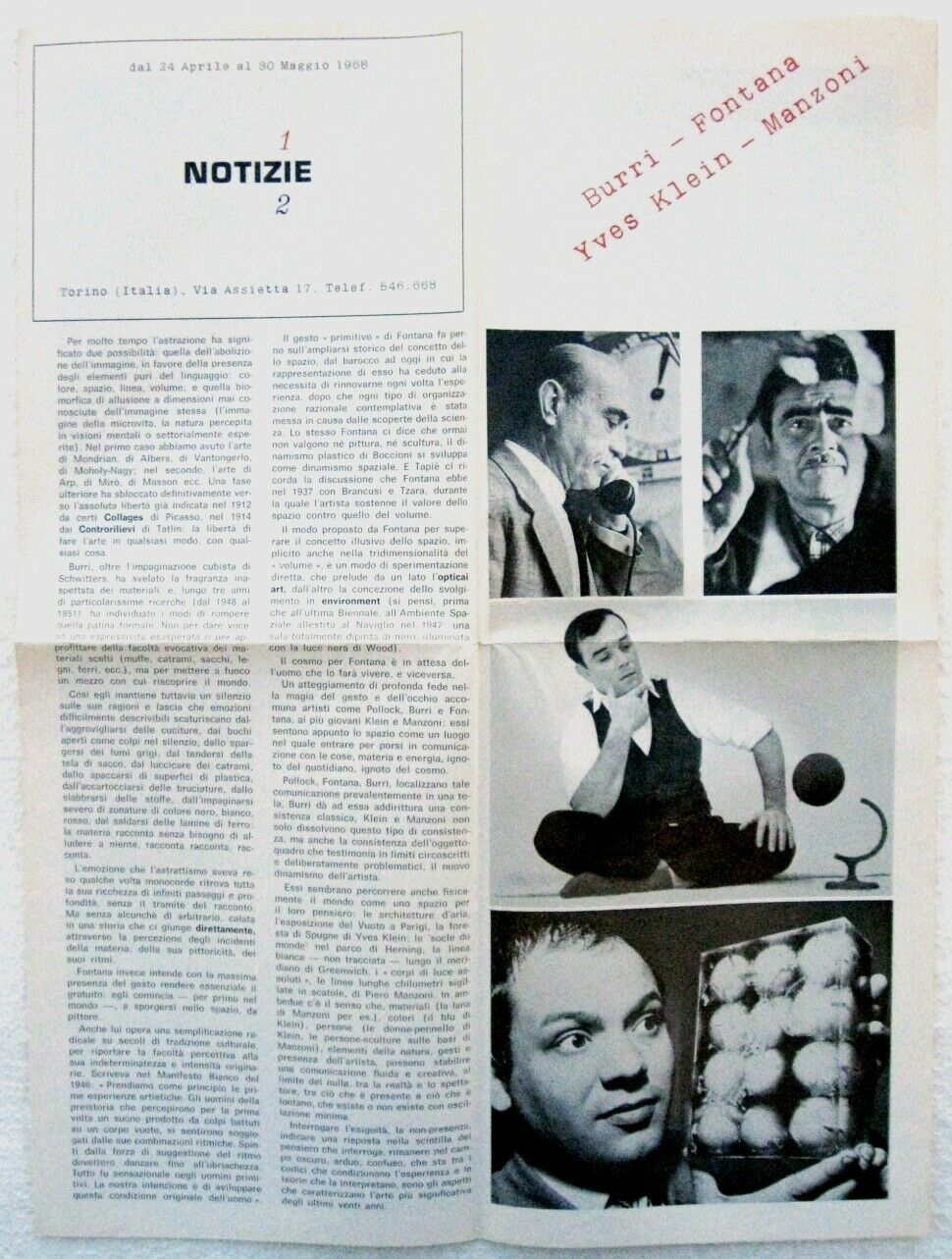
Alberto Burri, Lucio Fontana, Yves Klein, Piero Manzoni, Galleria Notizie 1968
