= Fossati =

Fossati may refer to:

- The Fossati brothers, Gaspare (1809-1883) and Giuseppe (1822-1891), were Swiss architects.
- Alessandra Fossati (born 1963), Italian high-jumper
- Domenico Fossati (1743-1785), Italian painter, engraver and decorator
- Ersilia Fossati (1921-1999), Swiss politician
- Ivano Fossati (born 1951), Italian singer
- Jorge Fossati (born 1952), Uruguayan football manager and former footballer
- Marco Fossati (born 1992), Italian footballer
- Maurilio Fossati (1876-1965), Italian Catholic cardinal
- Paolo Fossati (1938-1998), Italian author
- Valentina Fossati, Stem cell biologist
- Virgilio Fossati (1889-1918), Italian footballer
