= Mattiacci =

Mattiacci is a surname derived from the Hebrew given name "Mattathiah", meaning "gift of the Lord". Notable people with the surname include:

- Eliseo Mattiacci (1940-2019), Italian sculptor
- Marco Mattiacci (born 1970), Italian businessman
