= Renzo Fenci =

Italian-American artist and educator (1914–1999)

- Born: November 18, 1914; Florence, Italy
- Died: December 31, 1999 (aged 85); Los Angeles, California, U.S.
- Education: Royal Institute of Art, Instituto d'Arte Firenze

Renzo G. Fenci (18 November 1914 – 11 December 1999) was an Italian-American artist and arts educator, best known for his bronze sculpture. He worked in 1942 as a New Deal artist with the United States Treasury Department's Section of Painting and Sculpture.

== Biography ==
Fenci was born in Florence, Italy, on 18 November 1914. At a young age, he went to study art at the Royal Institute of Art. He received a master's degree in 1932 from Instituto d'Arte Firenze (Art Institute of Florence) and studied with sculptors Libero Andriotti and Bruno Innocenti.

He emigrated to New York City around 1937 or 1938, due to the change in politics in Europe and the rise of fascism. Fenci lived in New York City, New York and Madison, Wisconsin, before settling down in Pullman, Washington, in order to teach fine art at Washington State College.

He was commissioned in 1942 by the United States Treasury Department's Section of Painting and Sculpture (later known as The Section of Fine Arts) to create art. These commissions were for the creation of a series of terra-cotta bas reliefs for a post office in Easley, South Carolina, entitled “Cultivation of Corn”. Originally he planned to create six bas-relief panels, but the Section would only pay for three panels and there was much difficulty in the completion of the commission.

Fenci moved to Santa Barbara, California. From 1947 to 1954, he taught at Santa Barbara College (now called University of California, Santa Barbara). From 1955 until 1977, he was the head of the sculpture department at Otis Art Institute (now named Otis College of Art and Design).

Fenci has worked in the many public art museum collections including at the Uffizi museum, and the Smithsonian American Art Museum.

Fenci died at the age of 85 in Los Angeles, California, on 11 December 1999.

== Personal life ==
He was married to Jeanne Lyons Foster in Santa Barbara. Fenci had one son and two stepdaughters, his son is also a sculptor.

== See also ==
- List of New Deal sculpture
