= Paolo Fossati =

Italian author, professor and art historian

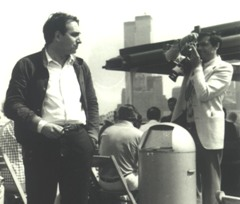

Paolo Fossati (1938 in Arezzo – 26 October 1998 in Turin) was an Italian scholar, author, professor and art historian of 20th-century Italian art, editor and later executive at the Einaudi publishing house.

== Biography ==
He was born in Arezzo to Teresa Negro and Pietro Fossati. Due to his father's work as chief cashier at the Bank of Italy, the family moved first to Palermo, then to Naples where Paolo attended the classical high school Francesco Denza in Posillipo Capo Napoli, and then in 1954 to Turin, where he completed his secondary studies first at the Collegio San Giuseppe, then obtained his diploma at the Liceo Massimo D'Azeglio. After a brief start in 1957 at the Faculty of Law, while simultaneously working in a bank as a customer relations officer, he moved at the end of 1959 to the Faculty of Arts and Philosophy at the University of Turin to attend lectures by Luigi Pareyson, Franco Venturi, Augusto Rostagni, and above all D'Arco Silvio Avalle, under whom he graduated and who, together with Corrado Grassi, served as supervisor of his thesis: Dialectal Parody and Multilingualism in Mimetic-Expressionist Function in the Romance Literatures of the Middle Ages, defended on 12 November 1965. Avalle himself appointed Fossati as a voluntary assistant to the chair of Romance philology (a role he held from July 1966 to November 1975) and also helped him enter Giulio Einaudi's publishing house.

Fossati had already begun writing for the newspaper L'Unità as an art critic before graduating, under the guidance of the painter Filippo Scroppo, and had then taken on independently – from 15 September 1965, a few months before his graduation – the coordination of the cultural page, the "third page" as it was called at the time, which had previously been managed by Luciano Pistoi. "He distinguished himself not only as an art critic, but also as a reviewer of books and cultural events, always engaged and never superficial."

For the twenty-seven-year-old, 1965 proved a decisive and eventful year: he married Eva Menzio, daughter of Ottavia Cabutti and the painter Francesco Menzio, and in September, his first son Filippo was born. He began collaborating, alongside Carla Lonzi, with the Notizie gallery run by Luciano Pistoi, and was hired at Einaudi. There, at that time, his mentor D'Arco Silvio Avalle was planning the journal Strumenti critici together with Maria Corti, Cesare Segre, and Dante Isella, with whom Fossati struck up a friendship and began to collaborate.

In January 1967 his daughter Caterina was born.

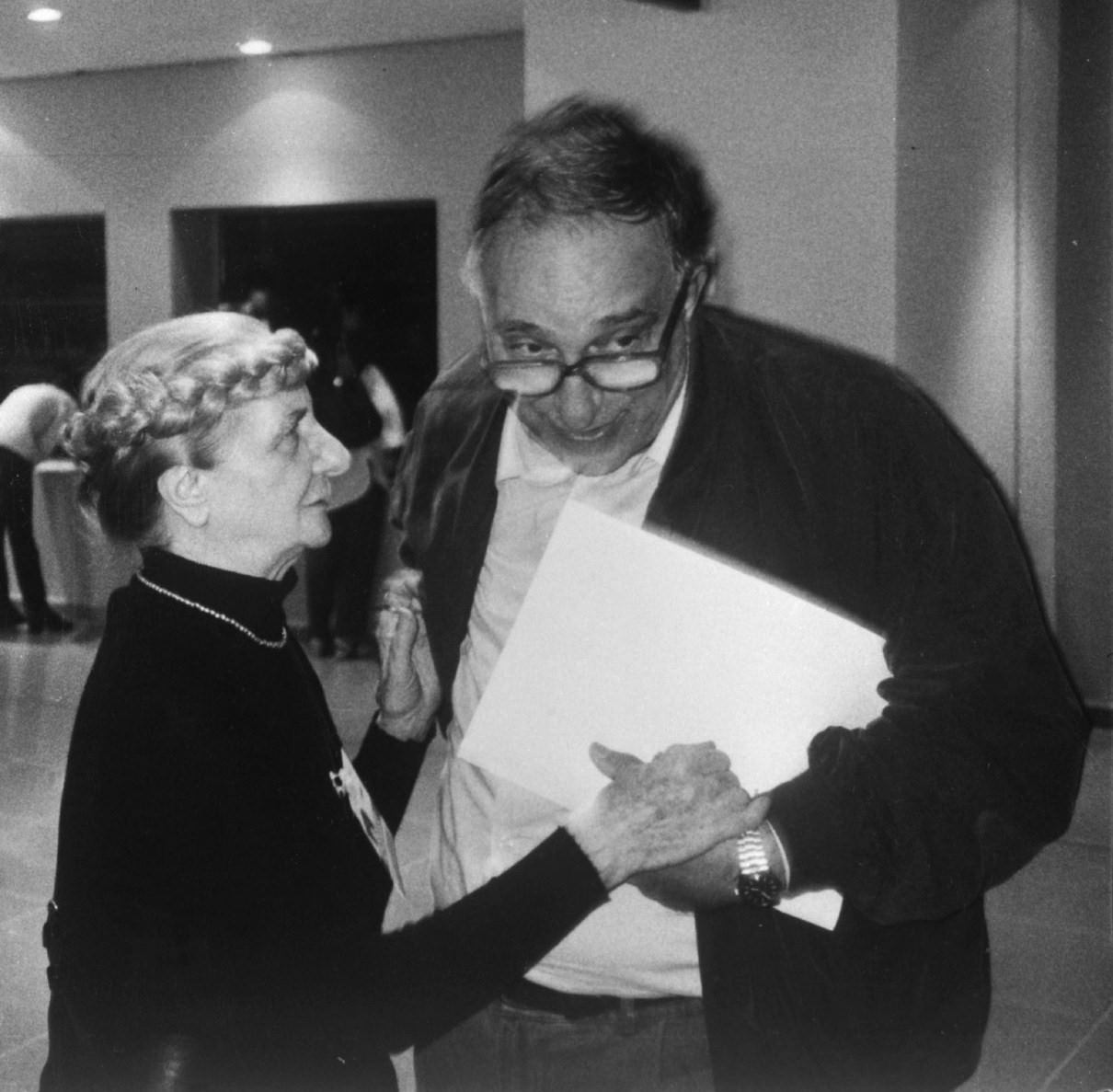
Carol Rama and Paolo Fossati 1980s

At Einaudi he was a colleague of Italo Calvino, Alberto Asor Rosa, Norberto Bobbio, Massimo Mila, Franco Venturi, Sergio Dionisotti, Vittorio Foa, Natalia Ginzburg, Enrico Castelnuovo, Giovanni Romano, and Ernesto Ferrero; he also collaborated with Carlo Levi, Primo Levi, Elsa Morante, Ernst Gombrich, Federico Zeri, Cesare Brandi, Zeno Birolli, Paola Barocchi, Arturo Carlo Quintavalle, and many others. He formed close bonds with the poet and essayist Edoardo Sanguineti, the great writer Giorgio Manganelli, and various artists including Albino Galvano, Carol Rama, Bice Lazzari, Luigi Veronesi, Giorgio Griffa, Marco Gastini, Pirro Cuniberti, Piero Ruggeri, Gino Gorza, Piero Manai, Bruno Munari, Leonardo Mosso, Laura Castagno, Giulio Paolini, Renata Boero, Ugo Mulas, Fausto Melotti, and Jiří Kolář.

In 1969 he had the idea, supported by Giulio Bollati, of a series that would serve as a meeting point between image and writing, between literature and art. This materialised as a series titled Einaudi Letteratura, which "ranges without limits. And it is also beautiful graphically, with each cover unique within a recognisable format" — "where you find a Calvino presenting the work of Giulio Paolini; Beckett and Bataille… Where you find Fontana's Spatial Concepts between a Ferlinghetti and a Sanguineti. Futurist Dynamism by Bragaglia alongside Mandel'stam. The splendid Objects of Affection by Man Ray, between Bragaglia and Breton. Then Fausto Melotti, The Restless Space, again with an essay by Calvino, between Céline and Cortázar." Beyond these, the series also published foundational texts by Ugo Mulas, Walter Benjamin, Alberto Savinio, Claude Simon, Carlo Emilio Gadda, Francesco Lo Savio, Bruno Munari, Giuseppe Penone, Luigi Veronesi, Alberto Burri, Luciano Fabro, and others.

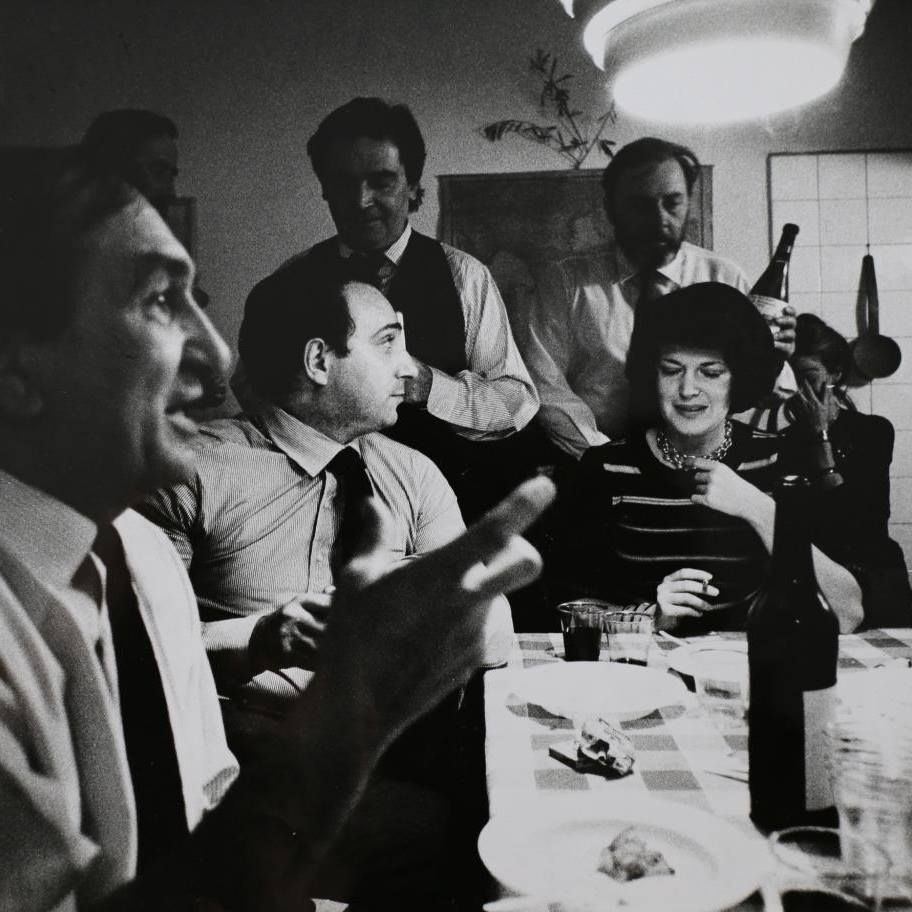
Left to right seated Marco Zanuso, Paolo Fossati and Lea Vergine, standing Roberto Sambonet and Guido Sambonet. Photo by Carla Cerati. Milan 1973

In 1972, he wrote the first study on Italian design in a volume titled Il design in Italia 1945–1972, published by Giulio Einaudi. This connected him to a generation of Italian architects and designers including Achille Castiglioni, Carlo Scarpa, Bruno Zevi, Bruno Munari, Marco Zanuso, Roberto Sambonet, Alessandro Mendini, Ettore Sottsass, Vittorio Gregotti, Enzo Mari, and many others.

He was the originator (together with Federico Zeri and Giovanni Previtali) and co-editor with Giulio Bollati of the encyclopaedic undertaking Storia dell'arte italiana (Einaudi), announced in 1972 and published from 1978 to 1983.

He taught Social History of Art and Methodology of Art Criticism at the University of Bologna DAMS from 1974, and Art History at the Faculty of Education at the University of Parma (1976–1979); he was Professor of Contemporary Art History at the University Institute of Architecture in Venice (1987–1989), professor of Contemporary Art History at the Scuola Normale in Pisa, where he held seminars within Paola Barocchi's course in History of Art Criticism (1990–1995), and professor of Contemporary Art History at the Polytechnic of Turin (1989–1991). He wrote prolifically throughout his entire life.

He died in Turin on 26 October 1998 and is buried in the cemetery of Pozzolo Formigaro, his father's hometown, "on a grim day, amid rain and fog," as Andrea Emiliani recalled at a study day held in honour of Paolo Fossati at the Gallery of Modern and Contemporary Art in Turin in November 2010 (the address was published in the volume edited by Miriam Panzeri, L'intellettuale mal temperato, Accademia University Press, Turin, 2015).

"His vast culture and sceptical worldview — above all regarding his own operational position — spurred him to pursue his investigations ever more deeply, never losing sight of the object of his studies, be it a book, a painting, or a sculpture. For Fossati, analysis had to be carried out on the concrete reality of the work, to the point that he considered himself to have no theoretical inclinations but rather to rely on strongly textual interpretations. At heart, a great reader. Despite — and indeed because of — his desire to unsettle his listeners, to compel the reader to question things and to question themselves, since his provocations and his challenges to everything commonly accepted (the extensive existence of the avant-gardes, for example) were never throwaway remarks without solid scholarly grounding, Fossati left a void not only in Turin's cultural world, but in that of Italy as a whole."

== Selected bibliography ==
- Paolo Fossati (a cura di), Lucio Fontana, Concetti spaziali, Torino, Einaudi, 1970.
- Paolo Fossati (a cura di), Man Ray, Oggetti d'affezione, Torino, Einaudi, 1970.
- Paolo Fossati, L'immagine sospesa. Pittura e scultura astratte in Italia (1934–40), Torino, Einaudi, 1971.
- Paolo Fossati (a cura di), Bruno Munari. Codice ovvio, Torino, Einaudi, 1971, ISBN 9788806134952.
- Paolo Fossati (a cura di), Fausto Melotti. Lo spazio inquieto, con 48 fotografie di Ugo Mulas e uno scritto di Italo Calvino, Torino, Einaudi, 1971.
- Paolo Fossati, Il Design in Italia: 1945–1972, Torino, Einaudi, 1972.
- Paolo Fossati (a cura di), Ugo Mulas. La fotografia, Torino, Einaudi, 1973.
- Paolo Fossati, La realtà attrezzata: scena e spettacolo dei futuristi, Torino, Einaudi, 1977.
- Bernardo Dovizi da Bibbiena, La calandria, a cura di Paolo Fossati, Torino, Einaudi, 1978, ISBN 9788806062545.
- Storia dell’arte italiana, coordinamento editoriale di Paolo Fossati e Giulio Bollati, Einaudi, Torino 1979–1983
- Paolo Fossati, Valori plastici 1918–22, Torino, Einaudi, 1981.
- Paolo Fossati, Pittura e scultura fra le due guerre, Torino, Einaudi, 1982.
- Paolo Fossati (a cura di), Luigi Veronesi. Fotogrammi e fotografie, 1927–80, Torino, Einaudi, 1983.
- Paolo Fossati, La pittura metafisica, Torino, Einaudi, 1988.
- Paolo Fossati, Storie di figure e di immagini: da Boccioni a Licini, Torino, Einaudi, 1995, ISBN 9788806136635.
- Paolo Fossati e Maria Perosino, Vittoria Chierici: storie, racconti: Studio Ercolani, marzo 1997, a cura di Giovanni Pintori, Bologna, Studio Ercolani, 1997.
- Paolo Fossati e Maria Perosino, Renata Boero, Ravenna, Essegi, 1997, ISBN 88-7189-232-1.
- Paolo Fossati, Autoritratti, specchi, palestre. Figure nella pittura italiana del Novecento, Milano, Mondadori Bruno, 1998, ISBN 9788842494713.
- Paolo Fossati e Charles Carrère, Africa – immagini di Renata Boero, Eidos, 1999, p. 60, ISBN 978-88-9899-724-4.
- Paolo Fossati La passione del critico. Scritti scelti sulle arti e la cultura del Novecento. a cura di G.Contessi e M.Panzeri, Bruno Mondadori, Milano 2009 ISBN 978-8861592872
- Officina torinese. Gli scritti giovanili di Paolo Fossati sull’arte nelle cronache de "L’Unità" 1965–1970, a cura di G.Contessi e M.Panzeri, Nino Aragno editore, Torino 2010 ISBN 9788884194824
- Chiara Portesine (a cura di) Paolo Fossati, Scritti, La Letteratura come metodo dello sguardo, Electa ed. Milano 2024 ISBN 978889282641-0
