= Valentina Fossati =

Stem cell biologist

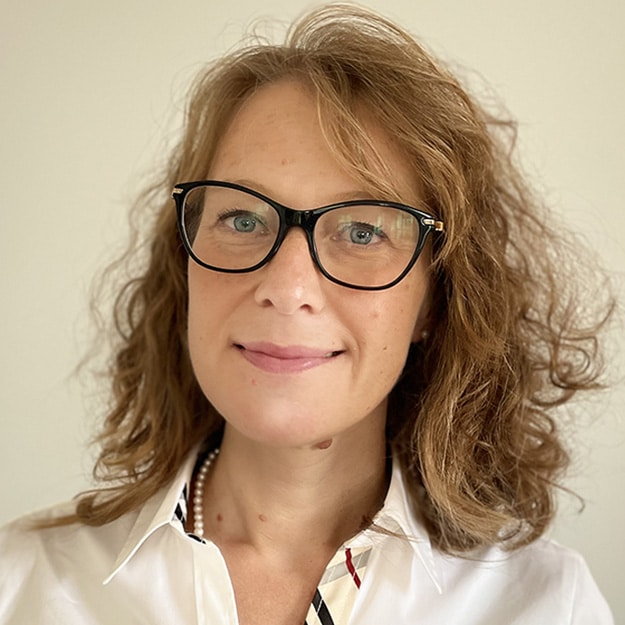
- Born: Rovigo, Italy

Academic background
- Education: University of Bologna; Mount Sinai School of Medicine

Academic work
- Discipline: Stem cell biology; Neuroscience
- Sub-discipline: iPSC modeling
- Institutions: The New York Stem Cell Foundation

Valentina Fossati is an Italian stem cell biologist. She is a senior research investigator at the New York Stem Cell Foundation. Her research is focussed on developing human stem cell-based models to study the role of glia in neurodegeneration and neuroinflammation.

== Early life and education ==
Fossati conducted her undergraduate studies in pharmaceutical biotechnology at the University of Bologna in Italy, where she also completed her doctoral degree in stem cell biology, receiving her PhD in 2008. She moved to the United States for postdoctoral work at Mount Sinai School of Medicine in New York.

== Career and research ==
In 2011, Fossati set up an independent lab at the New York Stem Cell Foundation (NYSCF). Her lab has established protocols for human stem cell-based models to study glia. She also leads NYSCF's multiple sclerosis program and is a Druckenmiller Postdoctoral Fellow Alumna.

Fossati has a particular interest in glial cell biology and how glia contribute to neurodegenerative and neuroinflammatory diseases, particularly multiple sclerosis. This is because she was diagnosed with multiple sclerosis in 2009. Her diagnosis led her to shift her research to better understanding this disease.

== Awards ==
- 2010: The Helmsley Foundation-NYSCF Innovator award for early career investigator
- 2009: NYSCF-Druckenmiller Postdoctoral Research Fellowship Award, The New York Stem Cell Foundation, NY, NY

== Select publications ==
- Labib, D; Wang, Z; Prakash, P; Zimmer, M; Smith, MD; Frazel, PW; Barbar, L; Sapar, ML; Calabresi, PA; Peng, J; Liddelow, SA; Fossati, V (2022). "Proteomic Alterations and Novel Markers of Neurotoxic Reactive Astrocytes in Human Induced Pluripotent Stem Cell Models". Front Mol Neurosci. 15 870085. doi:10.3389/fnmol.2022.870085. PMC 9113221. PMID 35592112.
- Wang, M; Li, A; Sekiya, M; Beckmann, ND; Quan, X; Schrode, N; Fernando, MB; Yu, A; Zhu, L; Cao, J; Lyu, L; Horgusluoglu, E; Wang, Q; Guo, L; Wang, YS; Neff, R; Song, WM; Wang, E; Shen, Q; Zhou, X; Ming, C; Ho, SM; Vatansever, S; Kaniskan, HÜ; Jin, J; Zhou, MM; Ando, K; Ho, L; Slesinger, PA; Yue, Z; Zhu, J; Katsel, P; Gandy, S; Ehrlich, ME; Fossati, V; Noggle, S; Cai, D; Haroutunian, V; Iijima, KM; Schadt, E; Brennand, KJ; Zhang, B (2021). "Transformative Network Modeling of Multi-omics Data Reveals Detailed Circuits, Key Regulators, and Potential Therapeutics for Alzheimer's Disease". Neuron. 109 (2): 257–272.e14. doi:10.1016/j.neuron.2020.11.002. PMC 7855384. PMID 33238137.
- Barbar, L; Jain, T; Zimmer, M; Kruglikov, I; Sadick, JS; Wang, M; Kalpana, K; Rose, IVL; Burstein, SR; Rusielewicz, T; Nijsure, M; Guttenplan, KA; Domenico, A; Croft, G; Zhang, B; Nobuta, H; Hébert, JM; Liddelow, SA; Fossati, V (2020). "CD49f Is a Novel Marker of Functional and Reactive Human iPSC-Derived Astrocytes". Neuron. 107 (3): 436–453.e12. doi:10.1016/j.neuron.2020.05.014. PMC 8274549. PMID 32485136.
- Li, L; Tian, E; Chen, X; Chao, J; Klein, J; Qu, Q; Sun, G; Sun, G; Huang, Y; Warden, CD; Ye, P; Feng, L; Li, X; Cui, Q; Sultan, A; Douvaras, P; Fossati, V; Sanjana, NE; Riggs, AD; Shi, Y (2018). "GFAP Mutations in Astrocytes Impair Oligodendrocyte Progenitor Proliferation and Myelination in an hiPSC Model of Alexander Disease". Cell Stem Cell. 23 (2): 239–251.e6. doi:10.1016/j.stem.2018.07.009. PMC 6230521. PMID 30075130.
- Madhavan, M; Nevin, ZS; Shick, HE; Garrison, E; Clarkson-Paredes, C; Karl, M; Clayton, BLL; Factor, DC; Allan, KC; Barbar, L; Jain, T; Douvaras, P; Fossati, V; Miller, RH; Tesar, PJ (2018). "Induction of myelinating oligodendrocytes in human cortical spheroids". Nat Methods. 15 (9): 700–706. doi:10.1038/s41592-018-0081-4. PMC 6508550. PMID 30046099.
- Douvaras, P; Sun, B; Wang, M; Kruglikov, I; Lallos, G; Zimmer, M; Terrenoire, C; Zhang, B; Gandy, S; Schadt, E; Freytes, DO; Noggle, S; Fossati, V (2017). "Directed Differentiation of Human Pluripotent Stem Cells to Microglia". Stem Cell Reports. 8 (6): 1516–1524. doi:10.1016/j.stemcr.2017.04.023. PMC 5470097. PMID 28528700.
- Douvaras, P; Fossati, V (2015). "Generation and isolation of oligodendrocyte progenitor cells from human pluripotent stem cells". Nat Protoc. 10 (8): 1143–54. doi:10.1038/nprot.2015.075. PMID 26134954..
- Smith, KA; Arlotta, P; Watt, FM; Solomon, SL (2015). "Seven actionable strategies for advancing women in science, engineering, and medicine". Cell Stem Cell. 16 (3): 221–4. doi:10.1016/j.stem.2015.02.012. PMC 4476252. PMID 25748929.
- Douvaras, P; Wang, J; Zimmer, M; Hanchuk, S; O'Bara, MA; Sadiq, S; Sim, FJ; Goldman, J; Fossati, V (2014). "Efficient generation of myelinating oligodendrocytes from primary progressive multiple sclerosis patients by induced pluripotent stem cells". Stem Cell Reports. 3 (2): 250–9. doi:10.1016/j.stemcr.2014.06.012. PMC 4176529. PMID 25254339.
