= Mario Nigro =

Italian painter

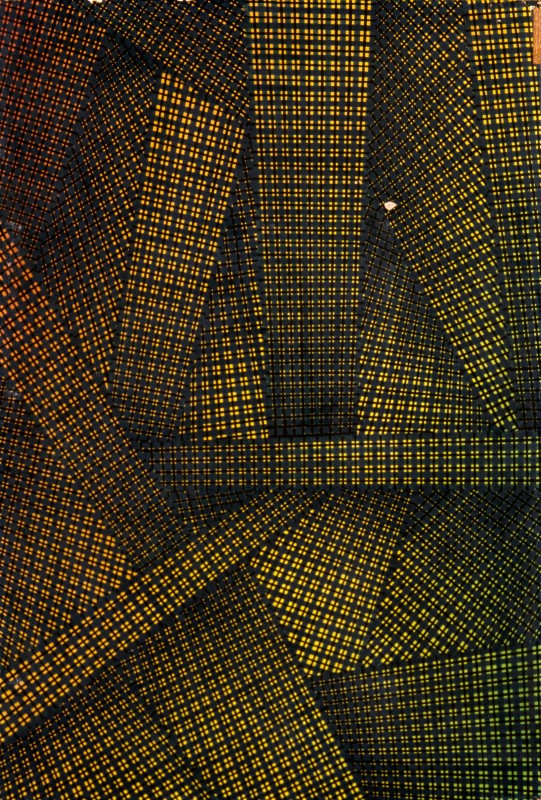
Dallo Spazio totale, 1953-1954 (Art collections of Fondazione Cariplo)

Mario Nigro (Pistoia, 28 June 1917 – Livorno, 11 August 1992) was an Italian painter.

== Biography ==
Nigro was born in Pistoia but he moved with his family to Livorno in 1929 when he was 12. He graduated in chemistry and pharmacology at the University of Pisa, in 1940 and 1947 respectively, while also studying music and painting. He worked as a pharmacologist but began to focus more systematically on art in 1948. Having joined the Movimento d’Arte Concreta after an initial post-Cubist period, he moved to Milan in 1949 and held his first solo show at the Libreria Salto. He worked in the field of abstract art from the late 1940s on, producing a number of different series, and took part in the Salon des Réalités Nouvelles in Paris in 1951. In 1964 Lucio Fontana was instrumental in getting Nigro invited to in the 32nd Venice Biennale. In 1968 Nigro was invited again, this time with an entire room exclusively dedicated to his work, cementing his reputation on an international level.

== Other projects ==
Media related to Mario Nigro at Wikimedia Commons
