= Bruno Innocenti =

Italian sculptor

Bruno Innocenti (4 February 1906 – 3 October 1986) was an Italian artist and educator, known for his sculptures.

== About ==
Bruno Innocenti was born on 4 February 1906 in Florence, Italy. He was the son of a goldsmith, Natale Innocenti, and his mother was Giulietta Freschi.

Between 1920 until 1923, he attended Istituto Statale d'arte di Firenze (Porta Romana Institute of Arts in Florence, or State Institute of Art of Florence of Porta Romana) and studied under Libero Andreotti. He attended his Italian military service in Verona, and returned to Florence in 1926 to work as Andreotti's art assistant.

After the death of Libero Andreotti in 1933, Innocenti took over the role as Chair of Sculpture at Istituto Statale d'arte di Firenze, where he stayed until 1975. Students of Innocenti included Giuliano Vangi, Renzo Fenci, Piero Tredici, Loreno Sguanci, and Raffaello Arcangelo Salimbeni.

His work, "Portrait of a young man", from the Gallery of Modern Art, Florence was featured in the 1939 New York World's Fair in the Italian Pavilion.

He died on 3 October 1986 in Florence, Italy.

== Personal life ==
He married Elsie Rowe on 31 October 1938. Together they had a daughter, Marta (born 1940) and a son, Stefano.
