= Libero Andreotti =

Italian artist and educator

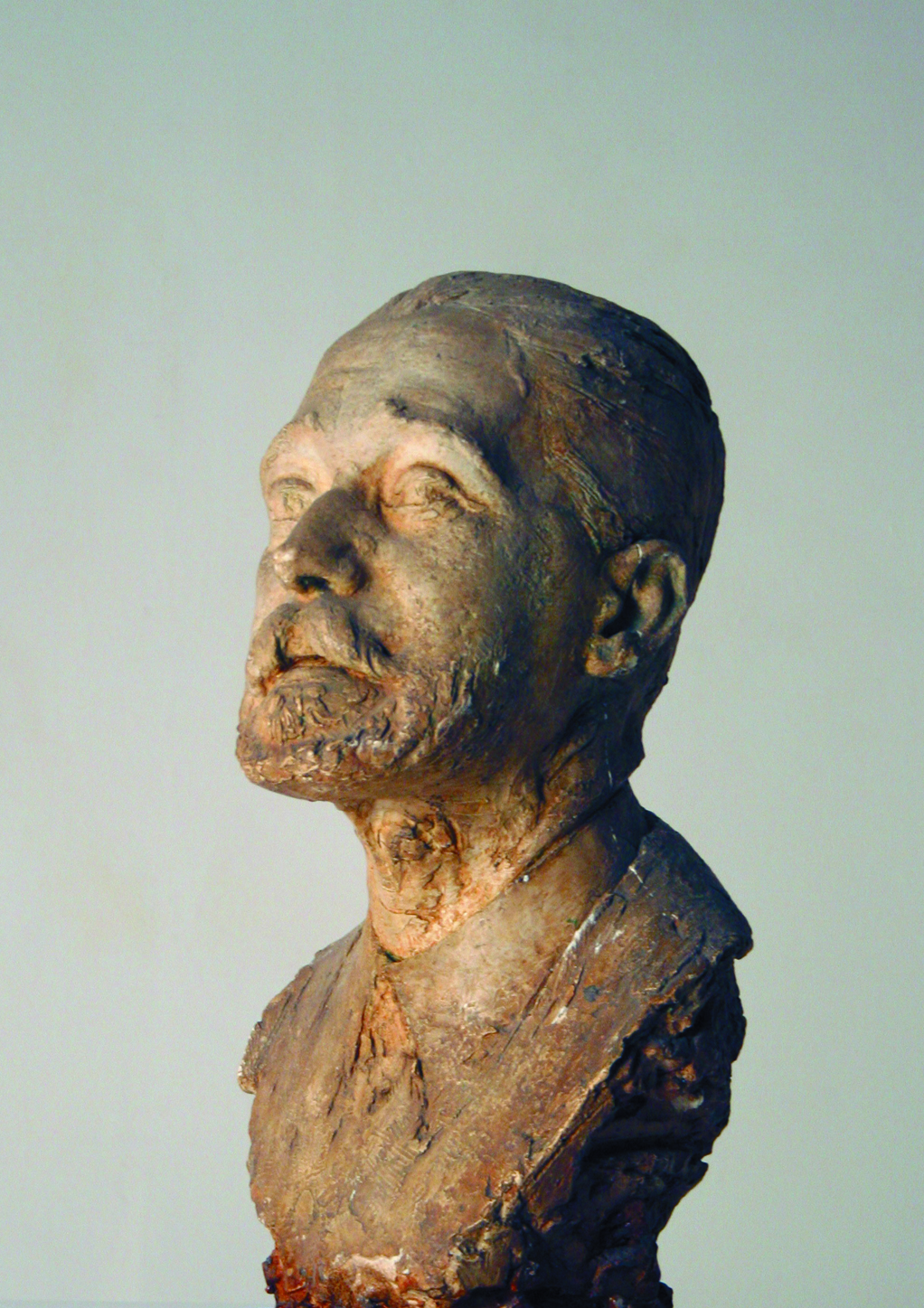
Portrait of Libero Andreotti (1932) by Bruno Innocenti, plaster

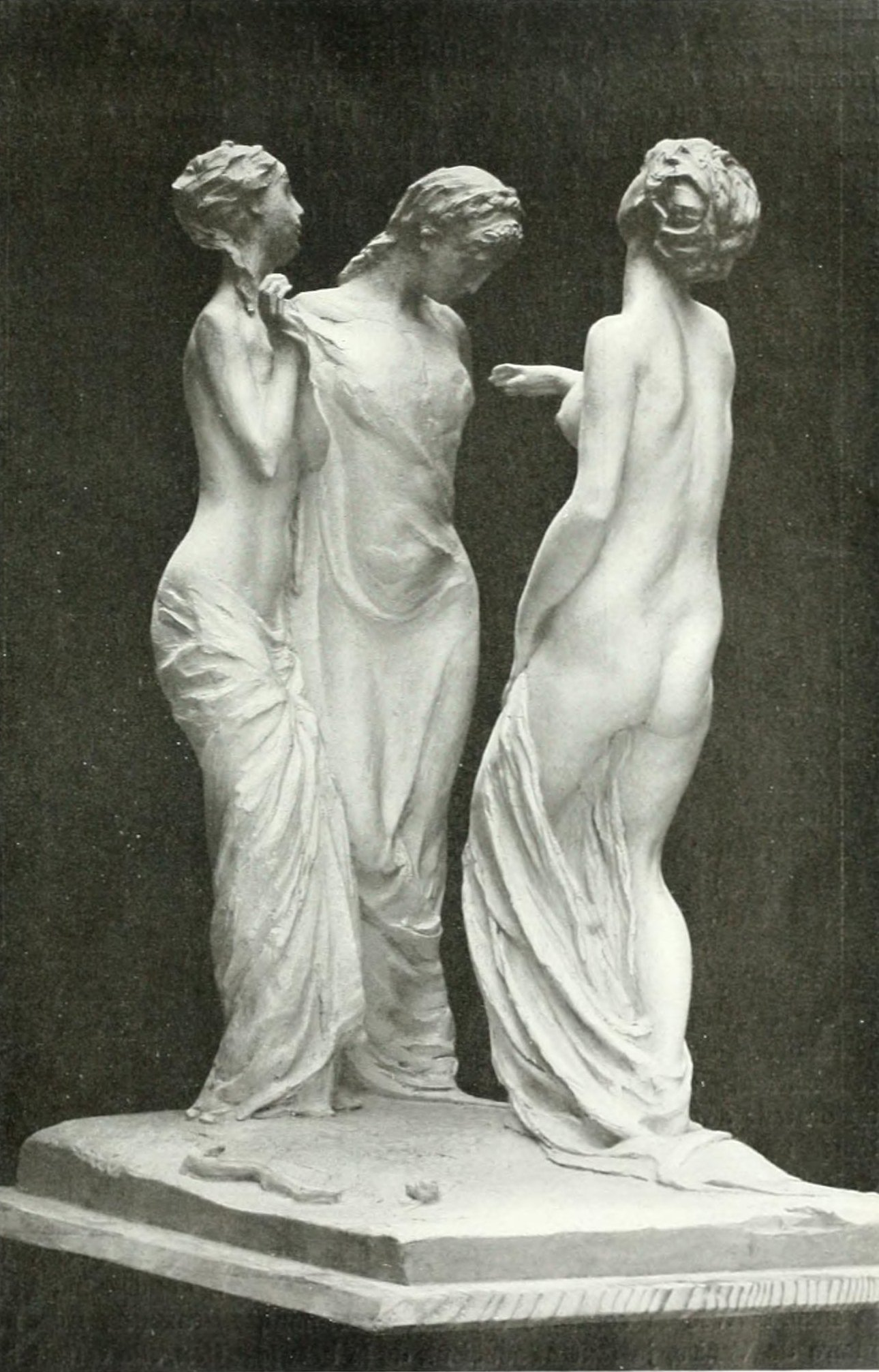
Les Trois Parques (1909), by Libero Andreotti

Libero Andreotti (18 June 1875 – 4 April 1933) was an Italian artist and educator, known as a sculptor, illustrator, and ceramics artist. He is often referred to as, "one of the foremost artists and sculptors of the early-twentieth century".

== About ==
He was born on 18 June 1875 in Pescia, Italy. He worked as a blacksmith until the age of 17, when he moved to Lucca and met poet, Giovanni Pascoli and Alfredo Caselli, who introduced him to arts. By 1899, he moved to Florence in order to start work as an illustrator and painter. He worked in a print shop and studied sculpture with Mario Galli in his studio. He served in the Italian military during World War I.

Andreotti taught sculpture classes at Istituto Statale d'arte di Firenze (Porta Romana Institute of Arts in Florence, or State Institute of Art of Florence of Porta Romana) and served as the Chair of Sculpture, from 1920 until his death in 1933. He was replaced in his teaching role by his former student and artist assistant, Bruno Innocenti.

He died on 4 April 1933 in Florence, Italy.

== Personal life ==
In 1923, Andreotti married Margherita Carpi.

== Art market ==
At a Bertolani Fine Art Roma auction in 2018, Libero Andreotti's Classic conversation (La conversazione classica, 1927), a with porcelain with Gio Ponti, was sold for Euro 82,500 plus auction fees.
