= Giulio Paolini =

Italian artist (born 1940)

Giulio Paolini, "Disegno geometrico", 1960. Photo Mario Sarotto

Giulio Paolini (Genoa, 5 November 1940) is an Italian artist, whose works fall within research that is considered Conceptual. He lives and works in Turin.

== Biography ==
The second son of Angelo Paolini, a business and economics graduate who worked in the commercial office of the Italian Institute of Graphic Arts, and Teresita De Maria, a middle school teacher. After spending his childhood in Bergamo, in 1952 he and his family move to Turin. There he attends the Giambattista Bodoni State Industrial Technical Institute for Graphic and Photographic Arts, graduating in 1959 from the Graphic Arts section.

He becomes interested in art at a young age, spending time in museums and galleries and consulting monographs and art magazines. He paints his first abstract works in the 1950s. His discovery of modern graphic art while studying and the presence of architecture magazines in his home – his older brother, Cesare, is an architect and the author of the Poltrona Sacco design – contributed to steering him towards a line of research aimed at eliminating the image.

In 1960 he makes his debut work, Disegno geometrico, an ink drawing squaring the rectangular surface of a canvas painted with white tempera. This preliminary gesture of any representation will remain the point of “eternal return” of the universe of Paolinian thinking: a topical moment and an original instant revealing the artist to himself represents the Conceptual foundation for all his subsequent work.

In the early 1960s Paolini develops his own research by focusing his attention on the components of the painting themselves, on the tools the painter uses and the space of representation. His first solo exhibition is held in 1964 in Rome at the Galleria La Salita directed by Gian Tomaso Liverani; there Paolini presents a series of natural wood panels propped up against the wall, suggesting the idea of an exhibition being installed. The exhibition is seen by Carla Lonzi and Marisa Volpi, who will soon afterwards write the first critical texts on the young artist.

In 1965 Paolini introduces the technique of photography, which allows him to extend his inquiry to the relationship between the artist and the work. That same year, thanks to Carla Lonzi, he meets Luciano Pistoi, the owner of the Galleria Notizie in Turin, who introduces him to a new circle of friends and collectors, and becomes his primary art dealer until the early 1970s.

Between 1967 and 1972 the critic Germano Celant invites him to participate in exhibitions dedicated to Arte povera, thus sanctioning the association of his name with this movement. In actual fact Paolini’s position stands in stark contrast to the vitalistic atmosphere and the “existential phenomenology” that characterizes the work of the artists championed by Celant. Paolini repeatedly declares his deep-seated connection to art history and programmatically identifies with the collective “I” of the artists who preceded him. Some of his most famous works stem from this intent, an approach that is far removed from the militant climate of the late 1960s. These works include: Giovane che guarda Lorenzo Lotto (1967), his “self-portraits” from Poussin and from Rousseau (1968), and paintings in which he reproduces details from Old Master works (L'ultimo quadro di Diego Velázquez, 1968; Lo studio, 1968). Key Paolinian references during these years are Jorge Luis Borges, to whom he pays homage on several occasions, and Giorgio de Chirico, from whom he borrows the phrase that underlies the work Et.quid.amabo.nisi.quod.ænigma est (1969).

The 1970s mark the beginning of his first official acknowledgement, ranging from exhibitions abroad that place him within the international avant-garde gallery circuit to his first museum shows. In 1970 he participates in the Venice Biennale with the work Elegia (1969), in which he uses a plastic cast of an antique subject for the first time: a cast of the eye of Michelangelo’s David with a mirror fragment applied to the pupil. A key theme during this decade is a retrospective look at his own work: from the literal citation of famous paintings he moves to self-citation, thereby proposing a historicization of his oeuvre from within. Works like La visione è simmetrica? (1972) and Teoria delle apparenze (1972) allude to the idea of the painting as the potential container of all past and future works. The motif of perspective follows this same line of inquiry (La Doublure, 1972-73): perspectival vision delineates an illusory space, creating a fundamental distance between the viewer and the artwork. Another theme explored with particular interest in this period is that of the double and the copy. This is most notably expressed in the series of works titled Mimesi (1975-76), consisting of two plaster casts of an ancient statue arranged so that they face each other, thus calling into question the very concepts of reproduction and representation.

In the 1980s constitute the period most densely packed with exhibitions and retrospectives, accompanied by significant monographic publications. During the first half of the decade, an explicitly theatrical dimension begins to emerge, characterized by works and installations that unfold across the space and are marked by fragmentation and dispersion (La caduta di Icaro, 1982; Melanconia ermetica, 1983), as well as by the introduction of theatrical figures, such as the eighteenth-century valets de chambre and other alter egos of the artist, along with garments and objects (Place des Martyrs, 1983; Trionfo della rappresentazione, 1984; Les instruments de la passion, 1986). Paolini’s poetics are considerably enriched by literary attributes and mythological references; the iconographic repertoire expands to include cosmic images. In the late 1980s, Paolini’s reflection focuses primarily on the very act of exhibiting. Beginning with his solo exhibition at the Musée des Beaux-Arts in Nantes in 1987, the concept of the exhibition increasingly takes shape as a “work of works”: these installations favour an associative and dialogic view of the exhibited pieces.

Over the course of the 1990s, the exploration of the concept of the exhibition takes on new forms. The installations become increasingly complex and often adopt layouts that can be additive (seriality, juxtaposition), centrifugal (dispersion or dissemination starting from a central nucleus), or centripetal (concentration and implosive overlaps). The exhibition space becomes the quintessential stage for the “theatre of the work”, that is to say, the work in the process of coming into being and dissolving: the place defines the very possibility of its occurrence (Esposizione universale, 1992; Teatro dell'opera, 1993; Essere o non essere, 1995). The completion of the work is constantly deferred, leaving the viewer in a state of perpetual anticipation, the same state the artist experiences each time he approaches his work site waiting for the work to manifest itself.

In the 2000s, another theme cherished by Paolini gains prominence in both his artworks and his writings: the identity of the author, the condition of the viewer, their lack of direct contact with the work, which always precedes and transcends them.

In 2004 the artist establishes the Fondazione Giulio e Anna Paolini together with his first wife. In collaboration with the Castello di Rivoli Museo d’Arte Contemporanea, directed by Ida Gianelli, in 2008 the Fondazione publishes the Catalogue raisonné in two volumes of the artist’s works from 1960 to 1999, edited by Maddalena Disch (Giulio Paolini. Catalogo ragionato 1960-1999, Skira editore, Milan).

Reflections developed in recent years remain principally centred on the figure of the artist, often with the complicity of the work table and the artist’s studio. This is evidenced by the first solo show dedicated to this theme, presented in 2013 at the MACRO Museo d’arte contemporanea di Roma by Bartolomeo Pietromarchi, and subsequently hosted by the Whitechapel Gallery in London.

Two major retrospectives are held in 2020 at the Castello di Rivoli Museo d’Arte Contemporanea, Rivoli-Turin, and at the Museo Novecento in Florence. The Rivoli exhibition reveals a tendency to trace back over personal memories through moments and experiences of lived experience incorporated in his works, whereas the Florence exhibition conveys a sense of melancholy, reflecting the artist’s state of mind as he approaches the final stage of his life.

In October 2022 Paolini is awarded the Praemium Imperiale for Painting, the most prestigious honour in the art world. In 2026 he receives two further honours: an Honorary Diploma in Painting from the Brera Fine Arts Academy, Milan, and an Honorary Degree in Art History from the University of Turin.

Paolini’s poetics and artistic practice are characterized overall as a self-reflective meditation on the dimension of art, on its timeless “classicism”, and on its perspective devoid of a vanishing point.

From the very beginning, Paolini has accompanied his artistic output with written reflections and considerations, which have been gathered over time in books and anthologies he has curated himself. The first collection of his writings, titled Idem and published by Einaudi, dates to 1975; the most recent include Quattro passi. Nel museo senza muse (Turin, 2006), Dall'Atlante al Vuoto in ordine alfabetico (Milan, 2010), L'autore che credeva di esistere (Milan, 2012) and Eccomi. Qui dove sono (Fondazione Giulio e Anna Paolini, Turin 2025).

== Exhibitions ==
Since his first participation in a group exhibition in 1961 and his first solo exhibition in 1964, his work has been exhibited in galleries and museums around the world. Major retrospectives have been held at Stedelijk Museum, Amsterdam (1980), Nouveau Musée, Villeurbanne (1984), Staatsgalerie Stuttgart, Stuttgart (1986), Galleria Nazionale d'Arte Moderna, Rome (1988), Neue Galerie am Landesmuseum Joanneum, Graz (1998), and Fondazione Prada, Milan (2003). More recent exhibitions have been held at Whitechapel Gallery, London (2014), Fondazione Carriero, Milan (2018), and Castello di Rivoli Museo d’Arte Contemporanea, Rivoli-Turin (2020).

He has participated in numerous Arte povera exhibitions, and has been invited on numerous occasions to Documenta in Kassel (1972, 1977, 1982, 1992) and to the Venice Biennale (1970, 1976, 1978, 1980, 1984, 1986, 1993, 1995, 1997, 2013).

== Set designs ==
In January 1969, Paolini is invited to create the set and costume designs for a theatrical production, Vittorio Alfieri’s Bruto II staged by the Teatro Stabile di Torino and directed by Gualtiero Rizzi. It is the beginning of many collaborations with the theatre.

In the 1970s and 1980s he goes further with his work in the theatre, in particular with Carlo Quartucci and his Zattera di Babele. Notable projects include the set and costumes for La fantastica storia di Don Chisciotte della Mancia (1970, winner of the 1971 Telecamera d’oro for set design for television) and the scenic pieces Comédie Italienne (1981) and Platea (1982).

At the start of the new millennium he creates sets and costumes for three ballets choreographed by Davide Bombana (Teorema, 1999; Aus der Ferne, 2000; La septième Lune, 2004), and then for two works composed by Richard Wagner and directed by Federico Tiezzi at the Teatro di San Carlo in Naples (Die Walküre, 2005, 25^{th} “Franco Abbiati” Italian Music Critics Award for Set Design, and Parsifal, 2007).

== National and International Collections ==
Giulio Paolini's works are present in numerous, internationally renowned public and private collections. The most significant of these in Italy and worldwide are:

Amsterdam	Stedelijk Museum
Athens	The George Economou Collection
Avignon	Collection Lambert en Avignon
Berlin	Staatliche Museen zu Berlin, Nationalgalerie, Sammlung Marzona
Busca (Cuneo)	Collezione La Gaia
Canberra	National Gallery of Australia
Chicago	The Art Institute
Cold Spring (New York)	The Olnick Spanu Collection Magazzino Italian Art Foundation
Dallas	The Rachofsky Collection The Warehouse Dallas
Eindhoven	Stedelijk Van Abbemuseum
Ghent	Herbert Foundation S.M.A.K.
Graz	Neue Galerie Graz
Grenoble	Musée de Grenoble
Laupheim	Sammlung FER
Lisbon	Museo Coleção Berardo, MAC/CCB Museu de Arte Contemporânea e Centro de Arquitetura / Centro Cultural de Belém
London	Tate
Lugano	Collezione Giancarlo e Danna Olgiati
Miami	The Margulies Collection at the Warehouse
Milan	Collezione Prada Museo del Novecento
Minneapolis	Walker Art Center
Montreal	MAC Musée d’art contemporain
Munich	Sammlung Goetz
Naples	Madre – museo d’arte contemporanea Donnaregina
New York	Solomon R. Guggenheim Museum
Oslo	The National Museum of Art, Architecture and Design
Otterlo	Kröller-Müller Museum
Paris	Centre national d’art et de culture Georges-Pompidou Fonds national d’art contemporain, CNAP MAM Musée d’Art Moderne de Paris Pinault Collection Bourse de Commerce, Parigi Palazzo Grassi e Punta della Dogana, Venezia
Potomac (Maryland)	Glenstone Foundation
Prato	Centro per l’arte contemporanea Luigi Pecci
Reggio Emilia	Collezione Maramotti
Rivoli (Turin)	Castello di Rivoli Museo d’Arte Contemporanea
Rome	Galleria Nazionale d’Arte Moderna e Contemporanea MAXXI Museo nazionale delle arti del XXI secolo
Rotterdam	Museum Boijmans Van Beuningen
Rovereto	MART Museo di arte moderna e contemporanea di Trento e Rovereto
San Francisco	SFMOMA San Francisco Museum of Modern Art
Santomato (Pistoia)	Collezione Gori Fattoria di Celle
Sindelfingen	SCHAUWERK Sindelfingen
Stuttgart	Staatsgalerie Stuttgart
Sydney	Art Gallery of New South Wales
Turin	GAM Galleria Civica d’Arte Moderna e Contemporanea
Toronto	AGO Art Gallery of Ontario
Toyota	Toyota Municipal Museum of Art
Vaduz	Kunstmuseum Liechtenstein
Vienna	MUMOK Museum moderner Kunst Stiftung Ludwig Wien
Villeurbanne	Institut d’art contemporain
Weimar	Klassik Stiftung Weimar
Winterthur	Kunst Museum

== Reference Galleries ==
Italy	
Bologna	Galleria Studio G7
Brescia	Galleria Massimo Minini
Milan	Galleria Christian Stein
Naples	Alfonso Artiaco
Torre Pellice / Turin	Tucci Russo Studio per l'arte contemporanea
Worldwide	
London	Lisson Gallery
New York	Marian Goodman Gallery
Paris	Galerie Marian Goodman

== Awards ==
1971	Telecamera d’oro (Golden Camera) for the set designs for Don Chisciotte by Carlo Quartucci
1973	Honorable Mention at the 12th Bienal de São Paulo
1975	Lucio Fontana Prize, Milan
1980	Bolaffi Prize 1980, Turin
1981	DAAD Artist-in-residence, Berlin
1983	Guest Artist of the Year, Le Nouveau Musée, Villeurbanne
1995	Chevalier dans l’Ordre des Arts et des Lettres (Knight of the Order of Arts and Letters), Paris
1998	Trigon Award, Graz
2000	Danza & Danza Prize for the set designs and costumes for the ballet Teorema by Davide Bombana
2000	International Koinè Career Award 2000, Verona
2002	Officier de l’Ordre des Arts et des Lettres (Officer of the Order of Arts and Letters), Paris
2006	25th Franco Abbiati Prize sponsored by the Italian Association of Music Critics for the set designs for Die Walküre by Richard Wagner directed by Federico Tiezzi
2015	Honorary Member of the Brera Fine Arts Academy, Milan
2017	Honorary Diploma in Painting from the Albertina Academy of Fine Arts, Turin
2022	Praemium Imperiale for Painting, Tokyo
2025	Italian Artist 2025, AICA Italia
2026	Honorary Diploma in Painting from the Brera Fine Arts Academy, Milan
2026	Honorary Doctorate in History of Art, University of Turin, Turin

== Fondazione Giulio e Anna Paolini ==
The Foundation holds the archives of Giulio Paolini and a collection of the artist’s works. It is responsible for the Catalogue Raisonné of his works; it also supports the mediation of the artist’s poetics and promotes initiatives aimed at the further study and dissemination of his oeuvre.

After the hard copy publication of the first two volumes of the Catalogue Raisonné in 2008 (click here for further information), the cataloguing of the artist’s works continued in digital form only.

The Foundation’s website allows open access to the Catalogue Raisonné of all the works by Giulio Paolini from 1960 to the present.

The online Catalogue Raisonné is divided into three sections:

- Paintings, sculptures, installations
- Works on paper
- Print editions and multiples
