= Luigi Stoisa =

Italian painter (born 1958)

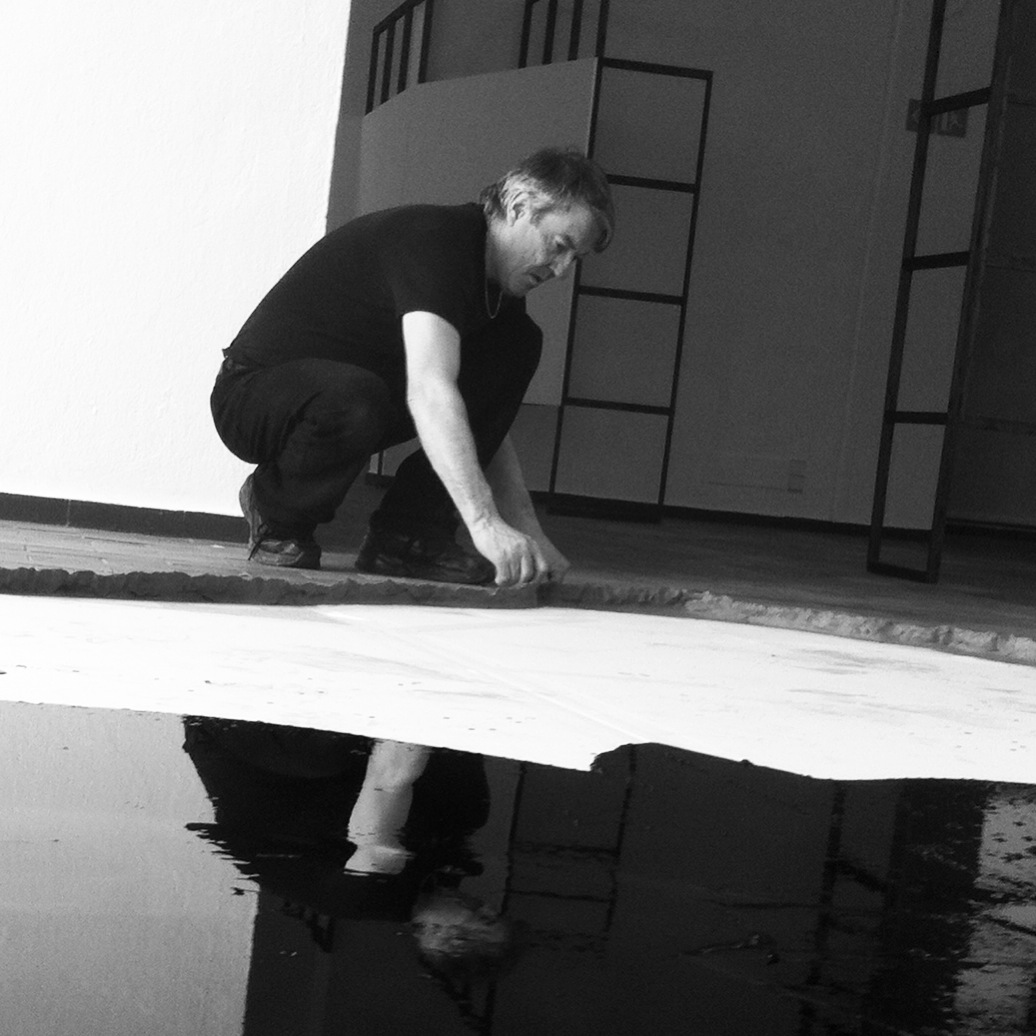
- Stoisa while working on an artwork for the exhibition A place where artists have the right to fail, which celebrates Fundació Joan Miró's Espai 13's 35th anniversary
- Born: 1958 (age 67–68); Selvaggio di Giaveno (Turin)
- Known for: painting, sculpture
- Notable work: L'Angello della Pintura (1981)
- Website: www.stoisa.it

Luigi Stoisa, (Selvaggio di Giaveno, Turin, 1958) is an Italian painter and sculptor. He began creating his artwork at the end of the 1970s while he was still studying at the school of Fine Arts in Turin. He is currently a professor as well as an artist.

== Biography ==
He first attended the school of Fine Arts in Turin and afterwards studied with Jole Desanna at the Brera Academy. He then continued with Luciano Fabro and Hidetoshi Nagasawa studying at their home in Milan. He held his first solo exhibition at the Tucci Russo Gallery in Turin. At the beginning of the 1980s, during the postmodernism, he began to research different forms of art expression, and at that same time he created his first mature artworks. He was a highlighted artist in important exhibitions in Italy and abroad. His artwork has been shown at Barcelona's Fundació Joan Miró (1985) and at the museum of Contemporary Art in Nice, France (1993) and the sculpture biennial in Carrara (2008).

== Artworks ==
Through his painting Stoisa wishes to express himself artistically in different forms and steers away from all preconceived notions of art. For him art is a constant confrontation between the past and the present. Through the use of different shapes and images, Stoisa transforms his work into poetic links and colour changes. He intentionally works in pure defined forms. His artworks feature contrasts between different surfaces, materials, textures, and dimensions. It is often compared to ready mades and Process Art.Some examples of all these elements were presented in 1990 at the Tucci Russo Gallery, where 4 installations highlighted the theatrical and scenic features of space.

=== L'Angelo della Pittura (1981) ===
This is considered one Stoisa's first mature artworks after finishing his education. There's an angel with a palette and brush in hand, depicted in an anachronic style. By his use of novel materials such as oil paint, tar and unframed canvas, it demonstrates his versatility in painting styles. This unframed technique allows Stoisa the freedom to abandon the traditional two dimensional system and leads him to create his later installations. Starting in 1982, he began to experiment with new materials such as copper leaf.

=== Le nostre strade infinito (Endless Roads, 1986) ===
A common feature of Stoisa's installations, is the use of tar as main material. In Endless Roads, the artist installed piles of rubber tyres against a wall that left a visual strip of tar creating a path throughout the gallery.

== Exhibitions ==
=== Solo (selection) ===
- 2010 Luigi Stoisa, Palazzo Litta, Milan
- 1999 Objekte - Zeichnungen - Galeria Clara Maria Sels, Düsseldorf
- 1998 Luigi Stoisa - "Objekte und Zeichnungen" - Galeria Clara Maria Sels, Düsseldorf
- 1986 Passeggio ad Amsterdam - Appel Arts Centre, Amsterdam
- 1985 Ferro-pintura-temps - Espai 10, Fundació Joan Miró, Barcelona

=== Group (selection) ===
- 2012 Scatola Negra - Allegretti Contemporary art, Turin
- 2011 SU NERO NERO/ OVER BLACK BLACK Castillo de Rivara, Contemporany Art Center, Rivara.
- 2008 XII International Sculpture Biennial, Carrara
- 1996 Aetas Mutationis - Neue Nationalgalerie, Berlin
- 1986 XI Quadriennale di Roma

== Bibliography ==
- Giulio Ciavoliello, Francesco Poli, Bernardo Mercuri, Giorgio Verzotti, and Eugenio Gazzola. Luigi Stoisa. 1982-1992. Fondazione Torino Musei. Torino, 1993.
