= Giuliano Briganti =

Italian art historian

Giuliano Briganti (2 January 1918 – 17 December 1992) was an Italian art historian.

== Biography ==
Giuliano Briganti was born in Rome. His father, Aldo Briganti, was an art dealer. Aldo studied under Igino Benvenuto Supino, graduated from the University of Bologna in 1914 with a thesis on Raphaelism, and was subsequently a student of Adolfo Venturi at the Advanced School of art history, part of the Faculty of Arts at the Sapienza University of Rome. Briganti's mother was named Clelia Urbinati.

In 1936 Giuliano Briganti graduated from Ennio Quirino Visconti High School in Rome. In 1940 he received a degree in history of medieval and modern art from Sapienza university, disputing his thesis with Pietro Toesca on the cinquecento Bolognese painter Tibaldi. The thesis later took the form of a monograph, Mannerism and Pellegrino Tibaldi, published in 1945.

Briganti’s first writings on art date to 1937, in the monthly “La Ruota”. In 1940 he sat on the editorial committee of the magazine, together with Mario Alicata, Antonello Trombadori, Guglielmo Petroni and Carlo Muscetta, contributing various pieces until 1941. In 1938 he began to publish essays and reviews in “La Critics d’Arte”, the art magazine founded by Carlo Ludovico Ragghianti and Ranuccio Bianchi Bandinelli. Between 1944 and 1945 he was editor of “Cosmopolita”, a magazine founded by Alessandro Morandotti in June 1944 during the liberation of Rome. This weekly, a precursor of “L’Espresso”, published work by many of twentieth century Italy’s foremost intellectuals: as well as Briganti himself these included Carlo Lizzani, Michelangelo Antonioni, Enzo Forcella, Giorgio Bassani, Renato Guttuso, Roberto Longhi, Anna Banti, Guido Carli, Arrigo Benedetti and Gastone Manacorda.

From 1965 to 1968 he wrote a weekly art column for L'espresso, a position formerly held by Lionello Venturi and Carlo Ludovico Ragghianti. He was an art critic for la Repubblica from 1976, the year the newspaper was founded, until he died. In both cases he had been chosen as critic by Eugenio Scalfari, first for the weekly and then for the daily edition. Giuliano Briganti expressly named two men as his masters: Carlo Ludovico Ragghianti and Roberto Longhi. He was the latter’s secretary from 1941 to 1943, at his study in Via Benedetto Fortini 30, Florence. From 1950, with Francesco Arcangeli, Ferdinando Bologna and Federico Zeri, he was on the editorial board of the new magazine Paragone Arte, founded by Roberto Longhi, which until 1961 published important essays by Briganti on seventeenth century Italian painting. He left the editorial board definitively ten years later, in 1971.

In 1949 he qualified as a university teacher and beginning from 1972 taught the history of modern and contemporary art at the University of Siena. In 1974 he married Luisa Laureati. In 1983 he moved to Rome where he held the chair of modern art history for a decade at what was then the Magistero and today is the Third University of Rome.

Giuliano Briganti’s library and photo library, today owned by the Municipality of Siena, are housed in Palazzo Squarcialupi, Siena, which is part of the Santa Maria della Scala complex. The books and the photographs of art works are accessible to the public. Information available online at the Comune di Siena website, Biblioteca Giuliano Briganti.

== Main works ==
- 1945 Il Manierismo e Pellegrino Tibaldi, Cosmopolita, Rome.
- 1950 I Bamboccianti, pittori della vita popolare nel Seicento, exhibition catalogue, Rome.
- 1961 La maniera italiana, Rome, Editori Riuniti (also in French).
- 1962 Pietro da Cortona o della pittura barocca, Florence, Sansoni.
- 1962 Il Palazzo del Quirinale, Rome, Istituto Poligrafico dello Stato.
- 1966 Gaspar van Wittel e l’origine della veduta settecentesca, Rome, Ugo Bozzi Editore (new updated edition edited by Laura Laureati and Ludovica Trezzani, Electa, Milan 1996).
- 1969 I vedutisti, Electa, Milan (also in English and German).
- 1969 Pittura fantastica e visionara dell'ottocento (in German: Phantastische Malerei im 19. Jahrhundert, 1974)
- 1977 I pittori dell’Immaginario. Arte e rivoluzione psicologica, Electa, Milan (revised, updated and republished in 1989).
- 1979 At Palazzo Grassi in Venice, with Ester Coen, he organised the exhibition Metaphysical Painting and edited the catalogue printed by Neri Pozza Editore, Venice.
- In 1983, with his assistants Laura Laureati and Ludovica Trezzani, he wrote the essay on Viviano Codazzi for the book I pittori bergamaschi dal XII al XIX secolo and the book on I Bamboccianti. Pittori della vita quotidiana a Rome nel Seicento, Ugo Bozzi Editore, Rome (also in English: The Bamboccianti. Painters of Everyday Life in Seventeenth Century Rome).
- 1986 Storia dell’arte italiana, edited by Carlo Bertelli, Giuliano Briganti and Antonio Giuliano, Electa-Bruno Mondadori, Milan.
- 1987, with André Chastel and Roberto Zapperi he made a study of the Galleria dei Carracci in Palazzo Farnese, Rome, putting forward new chronological interpretations: Gli amori degli dei. Nuove indagini sulla Galleria Farnese, published by Edizioni dell’Elefante, Rome.
- 1987 La pittura in Italia. Il Cinquecento, 2 vols. edited by Giuliano Briganti, Electa, Milan.
- 1990 La pittura in Italia. Il Settecento, 2 vols. edited by Giuliano Briganti, Electa, Milan.
- 1991 he published the general catalogue of De Pisis’ paintings: De Pisis: Catalogo Generale, Electa, and Il viaggiatore disincantato, Einaudi, Turin, a selection of his writings in “la Repubblica” on artists from the 18th century to the contemporary age.

== Writings published posthumously ==
- 1993 Laura Laureati and Ludovica Trezzani published a two volume complete catalogue of the paintings and frescoes (up to 1870) in the Palazzo del Quirinale. The work begun and carried on by Giuliano Briganti was entitled Il Patrimonio artistico del Quirinale. Pittura antica. La decorazione murale I, La Quadreria II, Electa, Milan.
- 1995 Giuliano Briganti, La riconquista dell’Olimpo nel secolo XV in Italia, Spanish Academy of History, Archaeology and Fine Art, Rome, limited edition in 600 numbered copies. Giuliano Briganti, edited by Luisa Laureati, in “Quaderni del Seminario di Storia della Critica d’Arte”, Scuola Normale Superiore of Pisa.
- 2002 Giuliano Briganti, Racconti di storia dell’arte. Dall’arte medievale al Neoclassico, edited by Luisa Laureati Briganti, Skira, Milan.
- 2003 Giuliano Briganti, Via Margutta, Edizioni della Cometa, Rome.
- 2007 Giuliano Briganti, Affinità, edited by Laura Laureati, Archinto, Milan.
