= Eliseo Mattiacci =

Italian sculptor (1940–2019)

- Born: November 13, 1940; Cagli, Italy
- Died: August 25, 2019 (aged 78); Pesaro, Italy
- Occupation: Sculptor

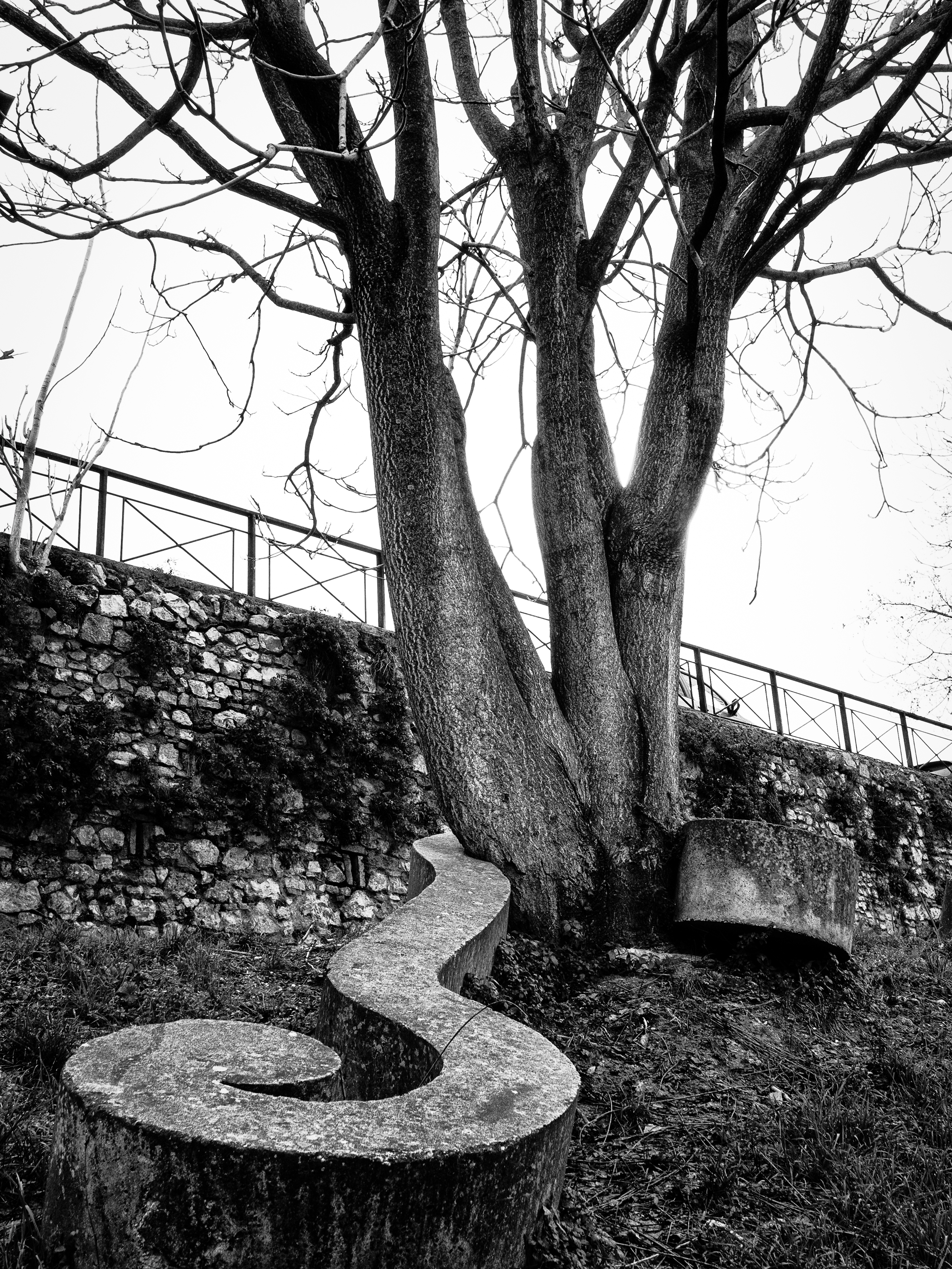
"Le passeggiate"

Eliseo Mattiacci (November 13, 1940 - August 25, 2019) was an Italian sculptor.

== Biography ==
Born in Cagli, Mattiacci moved to Rome in 1964. In 1967 La Tartaruga gallery opened Mattiacci's first solo exhibition, featuring “Tubo” (Tube), a 150 meters, yellow-coloured, nickel-plated iron tube designed to change the perception of the environment and encourage the public to modify it. In 1969 he staged a performative action at Galleria L’Attico by entering the gallery with a compressor that crushes a path made of pozzolana ash.

In 1967 Mattiacci started exhibiting with Alexander Iolas in Paris and New York.

In 1972 he was invited to the Venice Biennale.

During the 1980s, Mattiacci’s research focused on the use of metal with whom he realised large-scale works inspired by his interests in cosmic-astronomical themes. One of his pieces, “Carro Solare del Montefeltro” (Montefeltro Solar Chariot), from 1984, was exhibited at the 41st edition of the Venice Biennale in 1988.

In 1993, Fondazione Prada inaugurated its exhibition space in Milan with an exhibition of Mattiacci's work.

Mattiacci was the recipient of the 1995 Fujisankei Hokone Open Air Museum Biennial Prize in Tokyo and the Antonio Feltrinelli Sculpture Award in Rome in 2008. In 2013 Germano Celant edited a comprehensive monograph on his work published by Skira.

In 2016 the MART (Museo di Arte Moderna e Contemporanea di Trento e Rovereto) and Forte di Belvedere in Florence held a broad retrospective exhibition of his work.
